= List of zygaenid genera =

The moth family Zygaenidae includes the following genera:

- Achelura
- Acoloithus
- Adscita
- Aeacis
- Aethioprocris
- Agalope
- Aglaino
- Aglaope
- Agrumenia
- Agrumenoidea
- Allobremeria
- Allocaprima
- Allocyclosia
- Alloprocris
- Alophogaster
- Alteramenelikia
- Alterasvenia
- Amesia
- Amuria
- Anarbudas
- Ancistroceron
- Ankasocris
- Anthilaria
- Aphantocephala
- Arachotia
- Araeocera
- Arbudas
- Artona
- Astyloneura
- Atelesia
- Balataea
- Barbaroscia
- Biezankoia
- Bintha
- Birtina
- Boradia
- Boradiopsis
- Brachartona
- Bremeria (moth)
- Burlacena
- Cadphises
- Callizygaena
- Callosymploca
- Campylotes
- Canerkes
- Caprima
- Cerodendra
- Chalconycles
- Chalcophaedra
- Chalcosia
- Chalcosiopsis
- Chilioprocris
- Chrysartona
- Chrysocaleopsis
- Cibdeloses
- Cirsiphaga
- Clelea
- Clematoessa
- Cleoda
- Codane
- Coelestina
- Coelestis
- Coementa
- Collestis
- Corma
- Cryptophysophilus
- Cyanidia
- Cyclosia
- Devanica
- Didina
- Docleomorpha
- Docleopsis
- Dubernardia
- Elcysma
- Ephemeroidea
- Epiorna
- Epizygaena
- Epizygaenella
- Epyrgis
- Erasmia
- Erasmiphlebohecta
- Erythroclelea
- Eterusia
- Euclimaciopsis
- Eucorma
- Eucormopsis
- Eumorphiopais
- Euphacusa
- Eusphalera
- Eutychia
- Euxanthopyge
- Formiculus
- Formozygaena
- Funeralia
- Gaedea
- Gingla
- Goe
- Gonioprocris
- Gregorita
- Gynautocera
- Hadrionella
- Hampsonia
- Harrisina
- Harrisinopsis
- Harrisinula
- Hedina
- Hemichrysoptera
- Hemiscia
- Herpidia
- Herpolasia
- Hestiochora
- Hesychia
- Heteropan
- Heteropanula
- Heterusinula
- Histia
- Hoerwertneria
- Homophylotis
- Huebneriana
- Hysteroscene
- Illiberis
- Inope
- Inouela
- Isbarta
- Ischnusia
- Isocrambia
- Jordanita
- Klaboana
- Kubia
- Kublaia
- Lamprochloe
- Laurion
- Leptozygaena
- Levuana
- Lictoria
- Lophosoma
- Lucasiterna
- Lycastes
- Madaprocris
- Malamblia
- Malthaca
- Mesembrynoidea
- Mesembrynus
- Metanycles
- Milleria
- Mimascaptesyle
- Mimeuploea
- Monalita
- Monoschalis
- Morionia
- Mydrothauma
- Naufockia
- Neoalbertia
- Neobalataea
- Neofelderia
- Neoherpa
- Neoilliberis
- Neoprocris
- Neopryeria
- Neurosymploca
- Notioptera
- Onceropyga
- Opisoplatia
- Orna
- Pampa
- Panherpina
- Parasyntomis
- Peristygia
- Pernambis
- Peucedanophila
- Phauda
- Phaudopsis
- Philopator
- Phlebohecta
- Piarosoma
- Pidorus
- Pintia
- Platyzygaena
- Pollanista
- Pollanisus
- Pompelon
- Praeprocris
- Praezygaena
- Praviela
- Primilliberis
- Procotes
- Procris
- Procrisimilis
- Procrita
- Prosopandrophila
- Pryeria
- Psaphis
- Pseudarbudas
- Pseudonyctemera
- Pseudoprocris
- Pseudoscaptesyle
- Pseudosesidia
- Pteroceropsis
- Pycnoctena
- Pyromorpha
- Reissita
- Retina
- Rhagades
- Rhodopsona
- Rjabovia
- Roccia
- Saliunca
- Saliuncella
- Santolinophaga
- Sciodoclea
- Scotopais
- Seryda
- Sesiomorpha
- Setiodes
- Silvicola
- Soritia
- Sthenoprocris
- Stylura
- Subclelea
- Syringura
- Tascia
- Tasema
- Tetraclonia
- Thaumastophleps
- Theresimima
- Thermophila
- Thibetana
- Thyrassia
- Thyrina
- Tremewania
- Triacanthia
- Triprocris
- Trypanophora
- Turneriprocris
- Urodopsis
- Usgenta
- Vogleria
- Wiegelia
- Xenares
- Xenoprocris
- Yasumatsuia
- Zama
- Zeuxippa
- Zikanella
- Zutulba
- Zygaena
- Zygaenites
- Zygaenoprocris
