= Illiberis =

Illiberis may refer to:

- Ilíberis, a.k.a. Iliberris, Illiberi Liberini, ancient name for Granada
- Illiberis, a.k.a. Illibere, ancient name for Elne
- Illiberis (moth), a genus of moths in the family Zygaenidae

== See also ==
- Elimberri, a.k.a. Auch
- Elumberris, a.k.a. Lombez
- Concilium Eliberritanum, a.k.a. Synod of Elvira.
