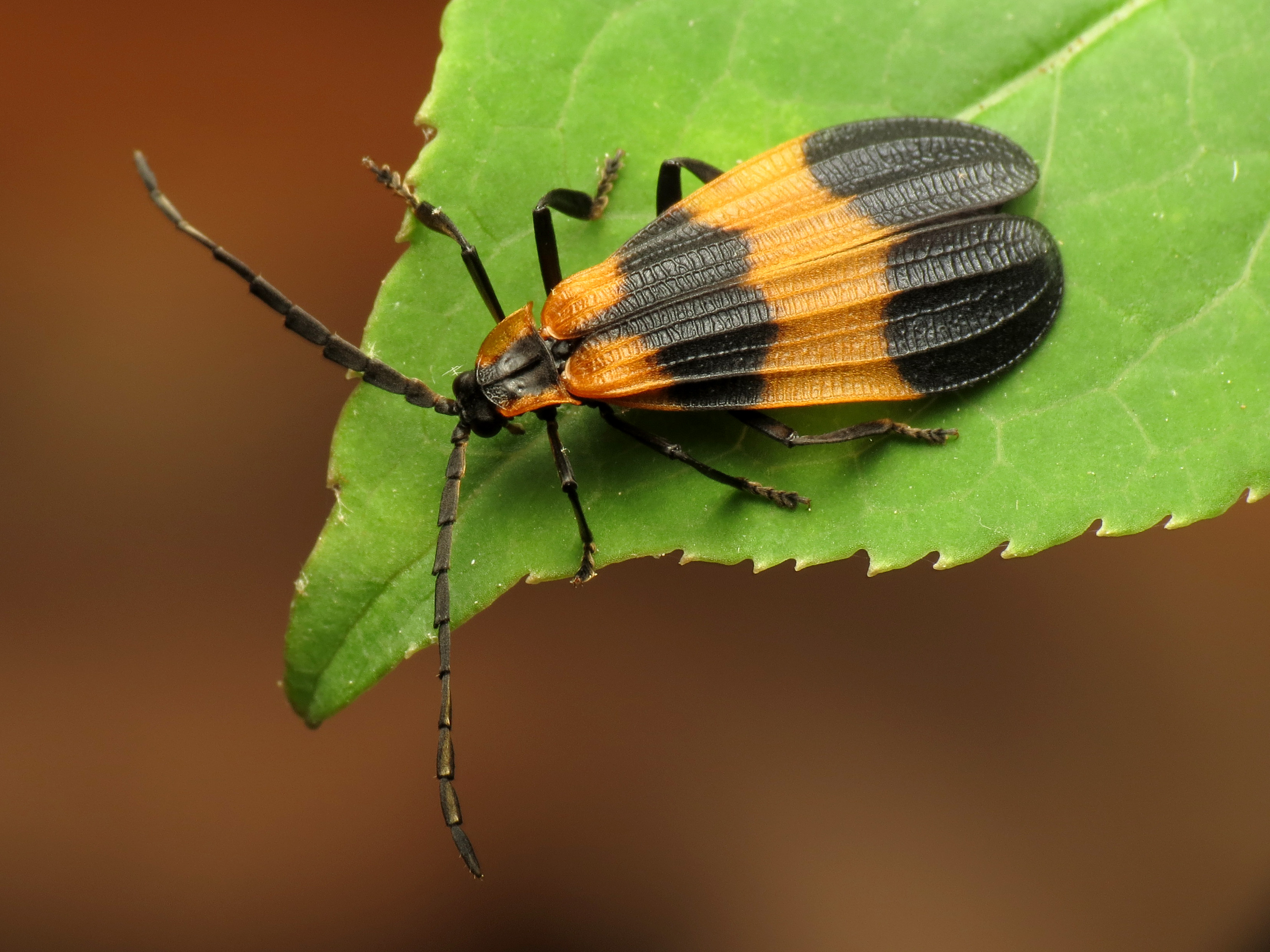

Scientific classification
- Domain: Eukaryota
- Kingdom: Animalia
- Phylum: Arthropoda
- Class: Insecta
- Order: Coleoptera
- Suborder: Polyphaga
- Infraorder: Elateriformia
- Family: Lycidae
- Genus: Calopteron
- Species: C. reticulatum

Binomial name
- Calopteron reticulatum (Fabricius, 1775)

= Calopteron reticulatum =

Species of beetle

Calopteron reticulatum, also known as the reticulated net-winged beetle, is a species of net-winged beetle in the family Lycidae. It is also known as the banded net-winged beetle, though that name is also used for the closely related and similarly banded Calopteron discrepans. It is found in North America. Adults are active during the day, and lay their eggs on dead/decaying trees. The species also pupates in dead trees. Larva hunt in leaf litter, eating other small arthropods.
