= Trypanophora trapobanes =

Scientific classification
- Kingdom: Animalia
- Phylum: Arthropoda
- Class: Insecta
- Order: Lepidoptera
- Family: Zygaenidae
- Genus: Trypanophora
- Species: T. trapobanes

Binomial name
- Trypanophora trapobanes Walker, 1854

Synonyms
- Trypanophora taprobanes Moore, 1882

Species of moth

Trypanophora trapobanes is a moth in the Zygaenidae family. It was described by Francis Walker in 1854 from Sri Lanka. Its larval host plants are in the genus Lagerstroemia.
