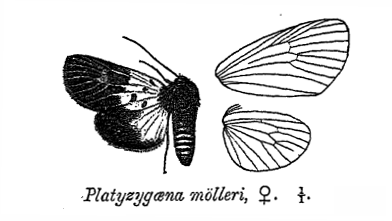

Scientific classification
- Kingdom: Animalia
- Phylum: Arthropoda
- Class: Insecta
- Order: Lepidoptera
- Family: Zygaenidae
- Genus: Platyzygaena
- Species: P. moelleri

Binomial name
- Platyzygaena moelleri (Elwes, 1890)

Synonyms
- Soritia moelleri Elwes, 1890

= Platyzygaena moelleri =

Species of moth

Platyzygaena moelleri is a species of moth of the family Zygaenidae. It is found in south-east Asia, including India.
