= Heteropan =

Scientific classification
- Kingdom: Animalia
- Phylum: Arthropoda
- Class: Insecta
- Order: Lepidoptera
- Family: Zygaenidae
- Genus: Heteropan; Walker, 1854

Genus of moths

Heteropan is a genus of moths belonging to the family Zygaenidae.

The species of this genus are found in Southeastern Asia.

== Species ==
Species:

- Heteropan agriolina Oberthür, 1894
- Heteropan alberti Rothschild & Jordan, 1905
- Heteropan albicosta Semper, 1898
- Heteropan albicruciata Hering, 1922
- Heteropan alienus Jordan, 1912
- Heteropan analis Jordan, 1907
- Heteropan anisus Jordan, 1907
- Heteropan apicalis Jordan, 1912
- Heteropan appendiculata Snellen, 1879
- Heteropan coeruleus Jordan, 1907
- Heteropan cupreatus Hampson, 1892
- Heteropan cyaneus Jordan, 1907
- Heteropan difformis Jordan, 1907
- Heteropan dolens Druce, 1888
- Heteropan eremophila Hering, 1922
- Heteropan fuscescens Dohrn, 1906
- Heteropan iscatus Jordan, 1912
- Heteropan lutulenta West, 1932
- Heteropan lycaenoides Walker, 1864
- Heteropan rubricollum Alberti, 1954
- Heteropan scintillans Walker, 1854
- Heteropan submacula Wileman, 1910
- Heteropan truncata Oberthür, 1894
