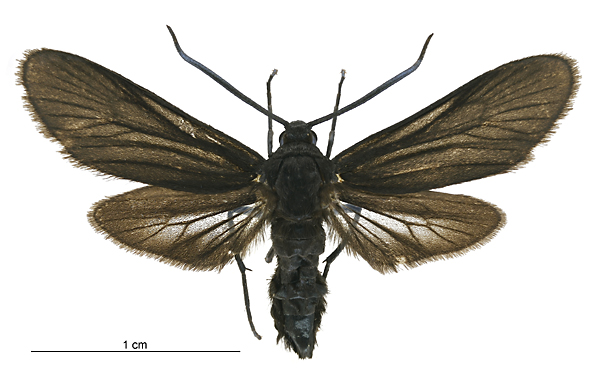
- Female
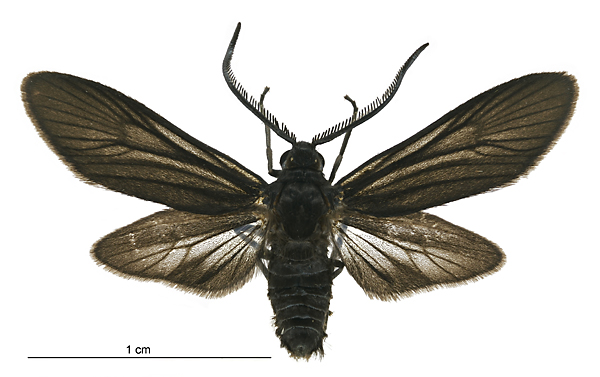
- Male

Scientific classification
- Kingdom: Animalia
- Phylum: Arthropoda
- Class: Insecta
- Order: Lepidoptera
- Family: Zygaenidae
- Genus: Artona
- Species: A. martini

Binomial name
- Artona martini Efetov, 1997

= Artona martini =

Species of moth

Artona martini is a species of moth of the family Zygaenidae. It is found in China and Japan and has also been observed in New Zealand.

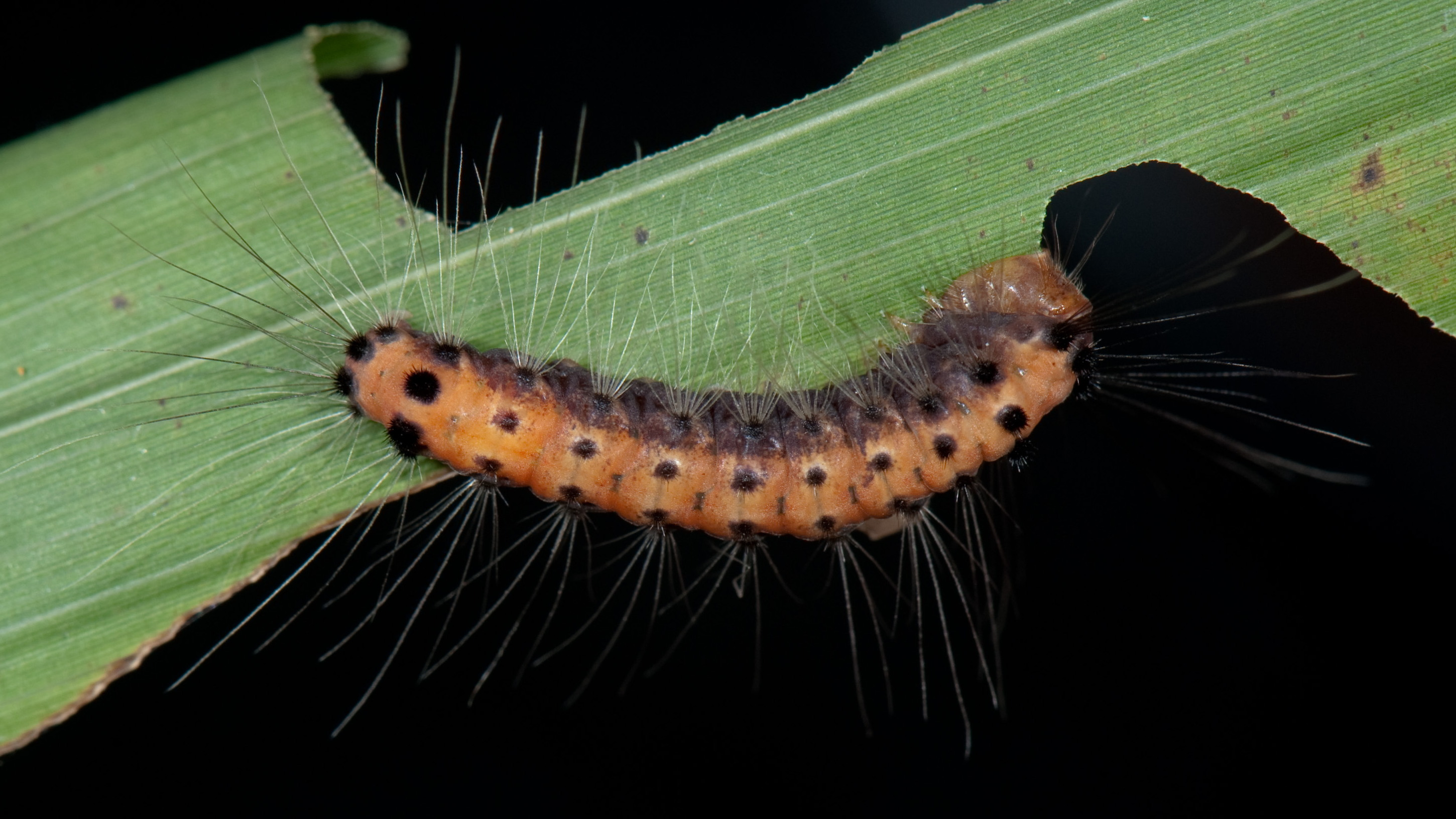
Artona martini larva
