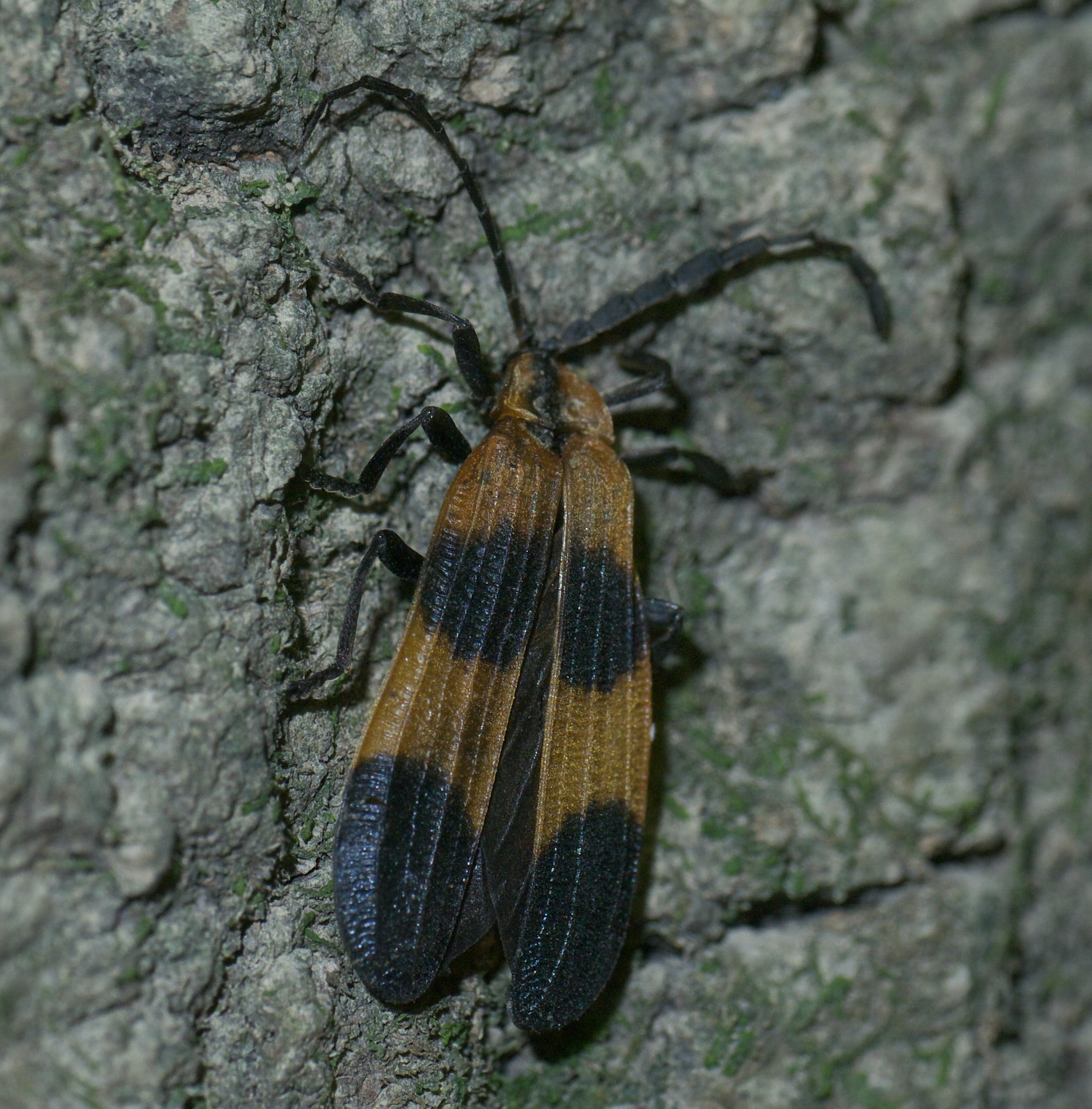

Scientific classification
- Kingdom: Animalia
- Phylum: Arthropoda
- Class: Insecta
- Order: Coleoptera
- Suborder: Polyphaga
- Infraorder: Elateriformia
- Family: Lycidae
- Tribe: Calopterini
- Genus: Calopteron; Laporte, 1838

= Calopteron =

Genus of beetles

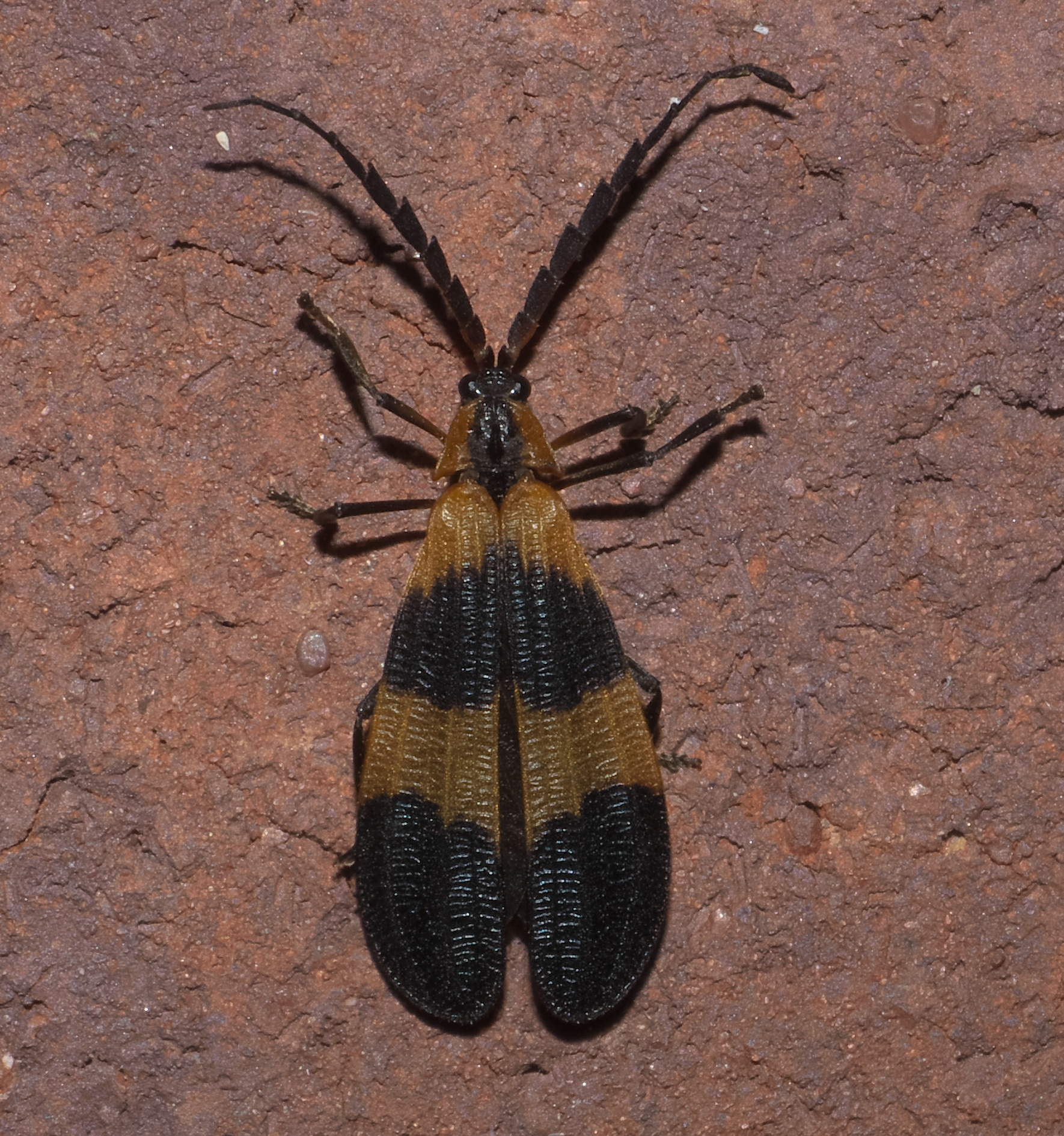

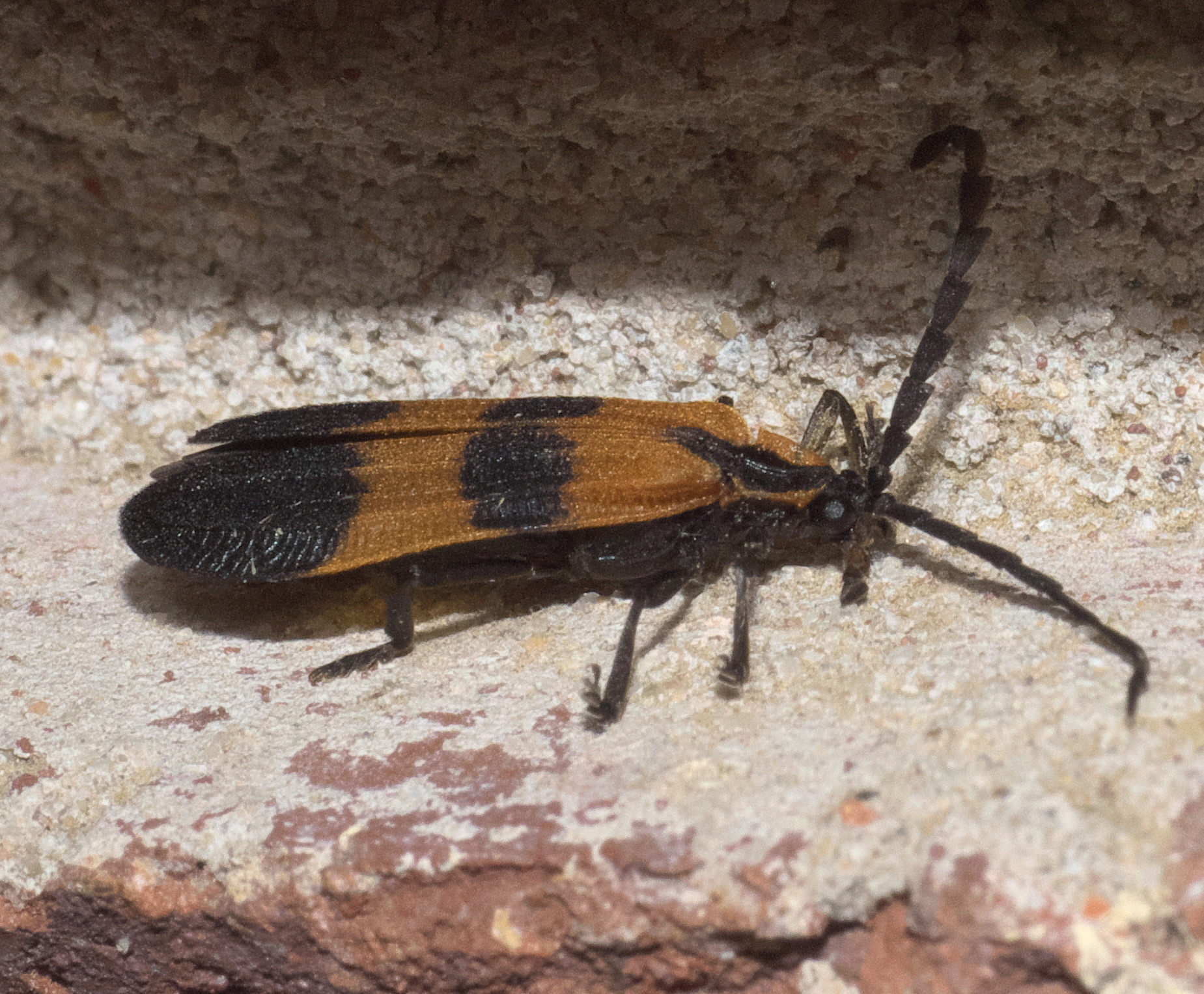

Calopteron is a genus of net-winged beetles in the family Lycidae.

They are toxic and have aposematic coloration. Some species of moths are mimics (Lycomorpha pholus, Pyromorpha dimidiata).

There are about 13 described species in Calopteron.

== Species ==
These 13 species belong to the genus Calopteron:

- Calopteron anxium Bourgeois, 1879
- Calopteron cyanipenne Pic, 1922
- Calopteron discrepans (Newman, 1838) (banded net-winged beetle)
- Calopteron leovazquezae Zaragoza-Caballero, 1996
- Calopteron megalopteron LeConte, 1861
- Calopteron quadraticollle Taschenberg, 1874
- Calopteron reticulatum (Fabricius, 1775) (banded net-wing)
- Calopteron scenicum Bourgeois, 1889
- Calopteron serratum (L., 1758)
- Calopteron terminale (Say, 1823) (end band net-wing)
- Calopteron terminatum Latreille, 1833
- Calopteron tricolor Olivier, 1790
- Calopteron tropicum (L., 1764)
