= Heteropan scintillans =

Scientific classification
- Kingdom: Animalia
- Phylum: Arthropoda
- Class: Insecta
- Order: Lepidoptera
- Family: Zygaenidae
- Genus: Heteropan
- Species: H. scintillans

Binomial name
- Heteropan scintillans Walker, 1854

Species of moth

Heteropan scintillans is a moth in the Zygaenidae family. It was described by Francis Walker in 1854 from Sri Lanka. One subspecies is recognized, Heteropan scintillans caesius Jordan, 1923.
