= Xenares =

Xenares (Ancient Greek: Ξενάρης) is an ancient Greek name. It appears in four instances in ancient sources:

- Xenares, a Spartan ephor during the Peloponnesian War.
- Xenares, son of Cnidis, a Spartan commander during the Peloponnesian War.
- Xenares, a friend and lover of king Cleomenes III.
- Xenares, son of Meixis, his name appears on an ancient inscription on Corfu.
