= Cerodendra quadripunctata =

Scientific classification
- Kingdom: Animalia
- Phylum: Arthropoda
- Class: Insecta
- Order: Lepidoptera
- Family: Zygaenidae
- Genus: Cerodendra
- Species: C. quadripunctata

Binomial name
- Cerodendra quadripunctata Hampson, 1893

Synonyms
- Dendrocera quadripunctata

Species of moth

Cerodendra quadripunctata is a moth in the family Zygaenidae. It was described by George Hampson in 1893 from Sri Lanka.
