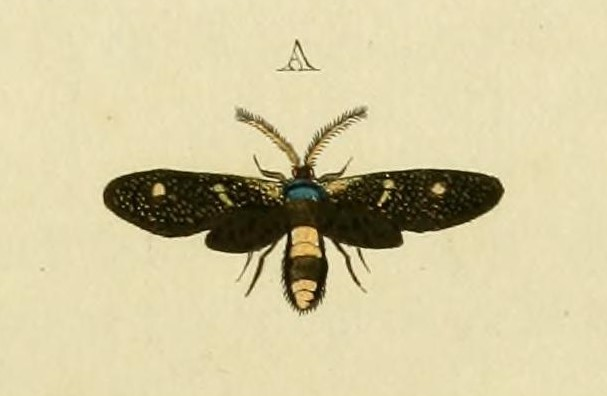

Scientific classification
- Kingdom: Animalia
- Phylum: Arthropoda
- Clade: Pancrustacea
- Class: Insecta
- Order: Lepidoptera
- Family: Zygaenidae
- Genus: Callizygaena
- Species: C. auratus

Binomial name
- Callizygaena auratus (Cramer, [1779])

Synonyms
- Sphinx auratus Cramer, [1779]; Callizygaena nivimacula Felder, 1874; Tascia gana Swinhoe, 1891; Callizygaena auricincta Swinhoe, 1892

= Callizygaena auratus =

Species of moth

Callizygaena auratus is a moth in the Zygaenidae family. It was described by Pieter Cramer in 1779 from Sri Lanka. One subspecies is recognized, C. a. nivimacula Felder & Felder, 1874.
