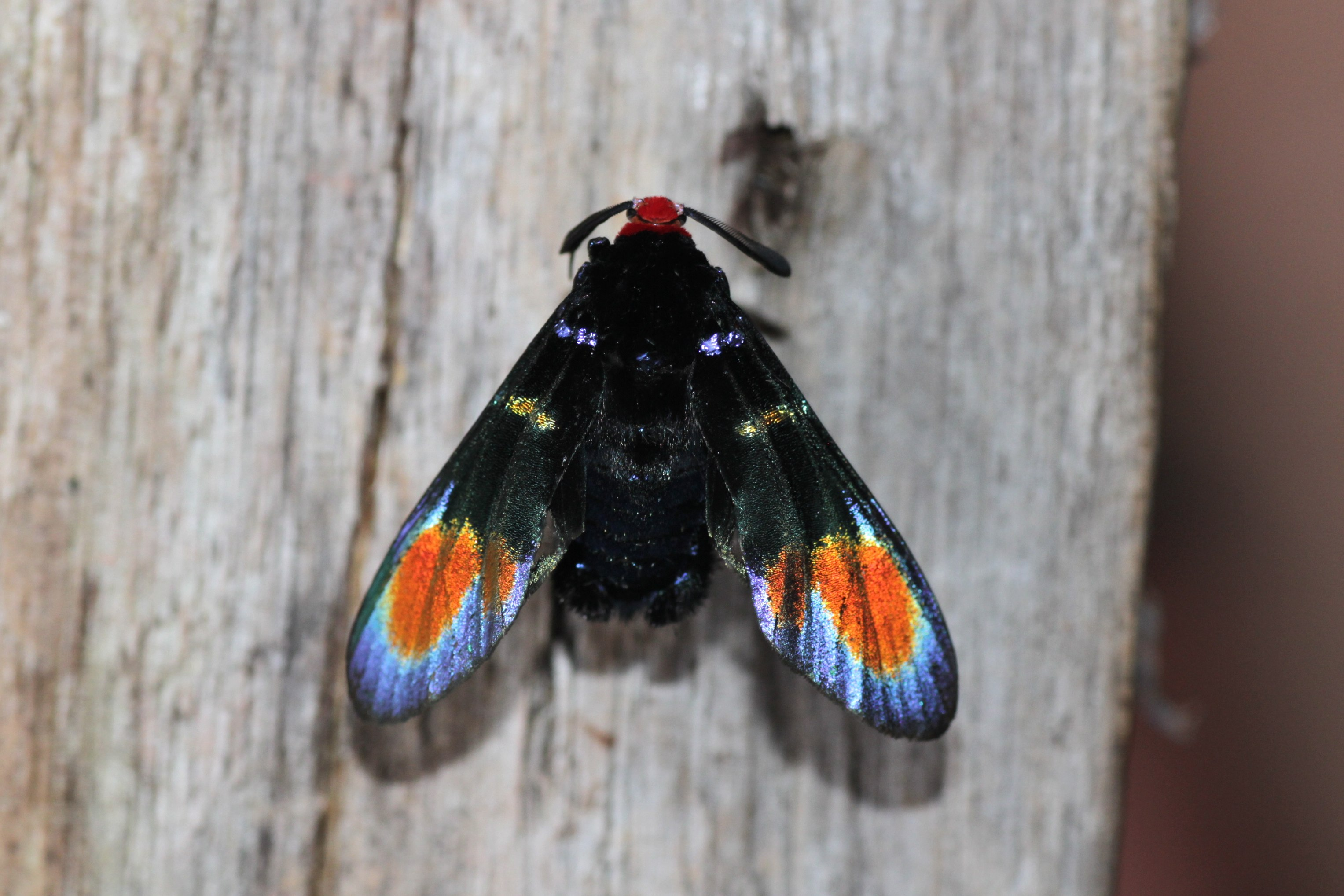

Scientific classification
- Domain: Eukaryota
- Kingdom: Animalia
- Phylum: Arthropoda
- Class: Insecta
- Order: Lepidoptera
- Family: Zygaenidae
- Genus: Callizygaena
- Species: C. ada

Binomial name
- Callizygaena ada (Butler, 1892)

Synonyms
- Mydrothauma ada Butler, 1892

= Callizygaena ada =

Species of moth

Callizygaena ada is a moth in the Zygaenidae family. It was described by Arthur Gardiner Butler in 1892. It occurs in lowland and lower montane areas, and is known from Borneo, Sumatra, Java, Thailand and Cambodia.

Female specimens have a lengthened ovipositor. The caterpillar is colorful and somewhat reminiscent of those of Limacodidae.

== Subspecies ==
As of June 2024, the Global Biodiversity Information Facility lists the following subspecies for Callizygaena ada:

- Callizygaena ada ada
- Callizygaena ada javana Rothschild, 1903
- Callizygaena ada jucunda Rothschild, 1903
- Callizygaena ada sarah Snellen, 1910
- Callizygaena ada splendens Candèze, 1927
