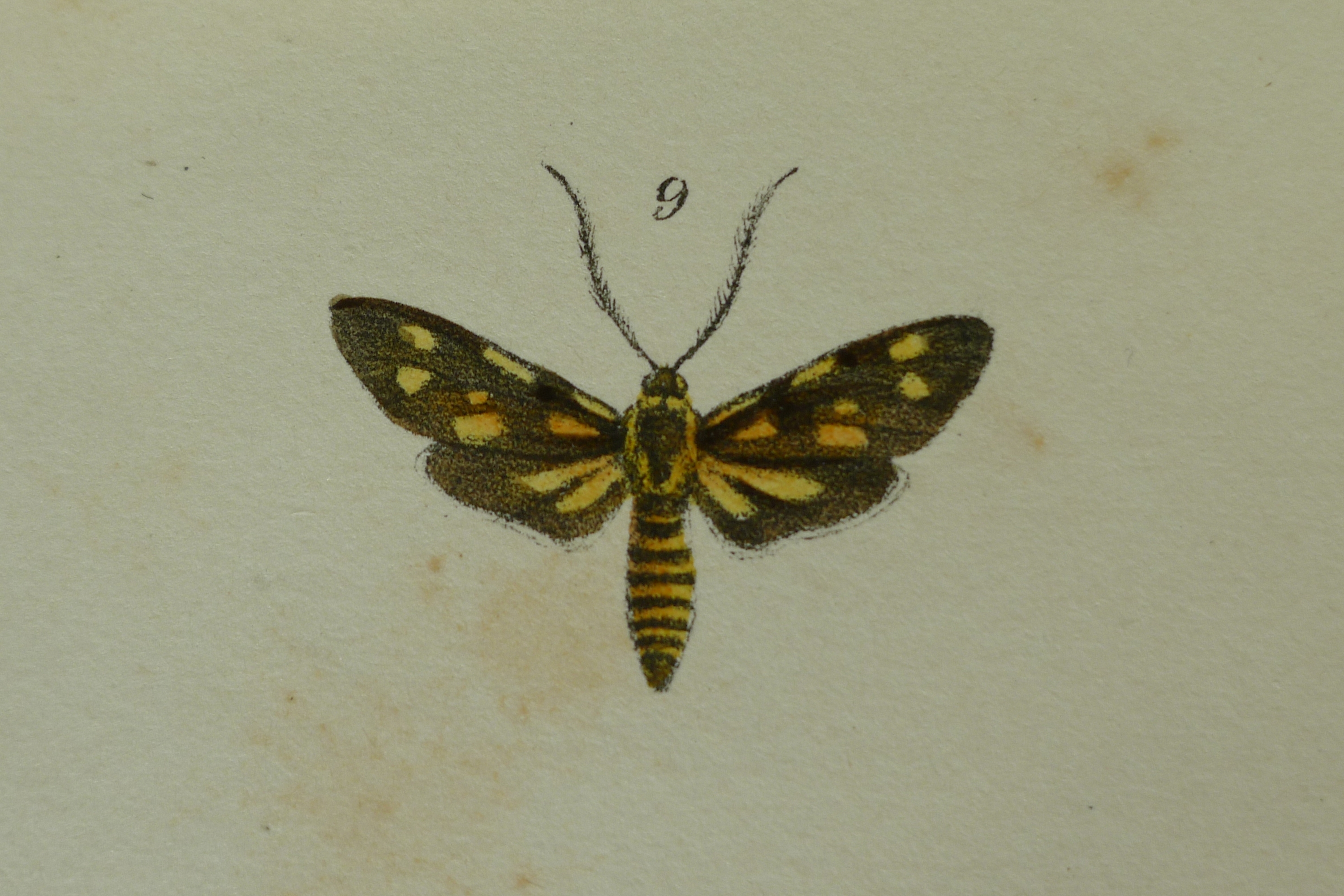

Scientific classification
- Domain: Eukaryota
- Kingdom: Animalia
- Phylum: Arthropoda
- Class: Insecta
- Order: Lepidoptera
- Family: Zygaenidae
- Genus: Artona
- Species: A. walkeri

Binomial name
- Artona walkeri (Moore, 1859)

Synonyms
- Syntomis walkeri Moore, 1859; Balataea walkeri

= Artona walkeri =

Species of moth

Artona walkeri is a species of moth in the family Zygaenidae. It is found on Java and Bali.

The wingspan is about 24 mm.
