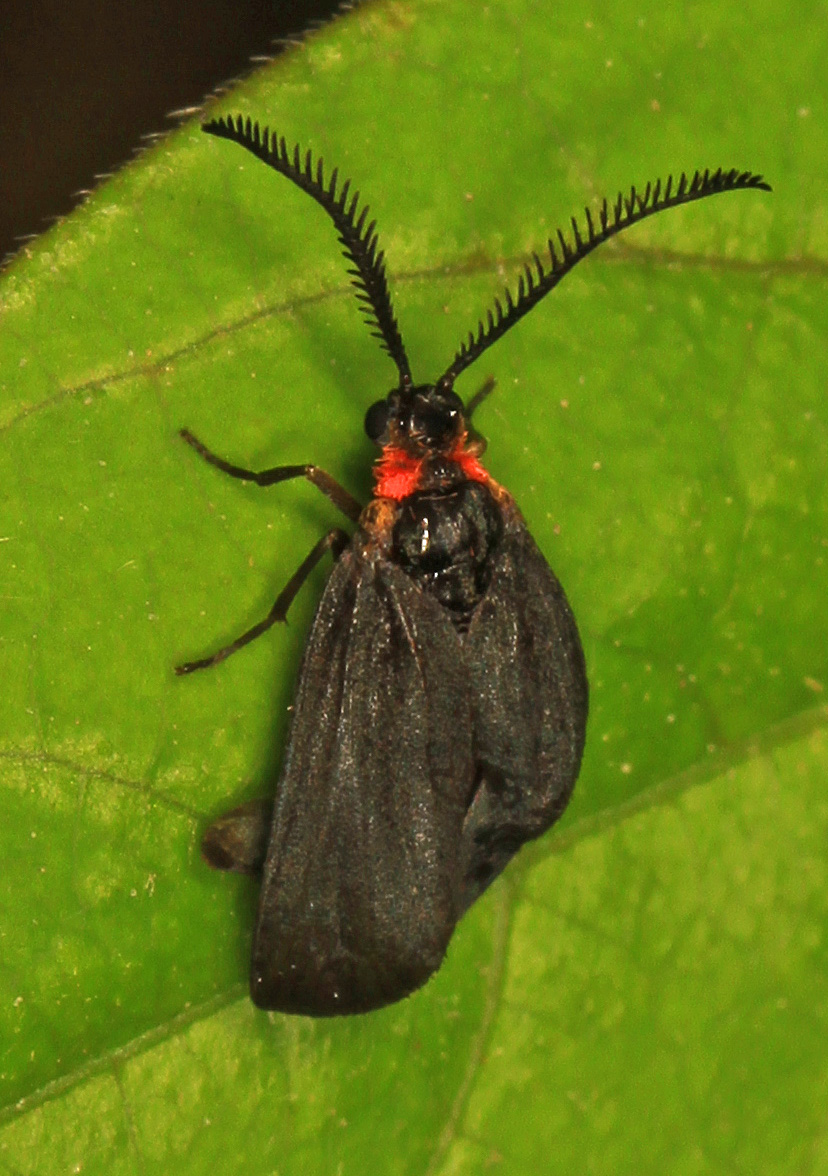

Scientific classification
- Kingdom: Animalia
- Phylum: Arthropoda
- Class: Insecta
- Order: Lepidoptera
- Family: Zygaenidae
- Genus: Acoloithus
- Species: A. falsarius

Binomial name
- Acoloithus falsarius Clemens, 1860

Synonyms
- Harrisina sanborni Packard Jr., 1864; Acoloithus sanborni (Packard Jr., 1864); Urodus ruficollis H. Druce, 1884

= Acoloithus falsarius =

Clemens' false skeletonizer

North American moth species of family Zygaenidae

Acoloithus falsarius, or Clemens' false skeletonizer, is a moth species in the zygaenid subfamily Procridinae. The species occurs in North America and was described by James Brackenridge Clemens in 1860. A. falsarius has Hodges number 4629 and is the type species of genus Acoloithus.

Larvae are known to feed on Vitis spp. and Ampelopsis spp.

== Appearance and behavior ==
Adults of A. falsarius have a wingspan of approx. 15 mm, a length of 9 to 10 mm, and are black with a broken orange collar. Larvae have a length of 8 to 9 mm. In Florida, Acoloithus falsarius has two generations per year.
