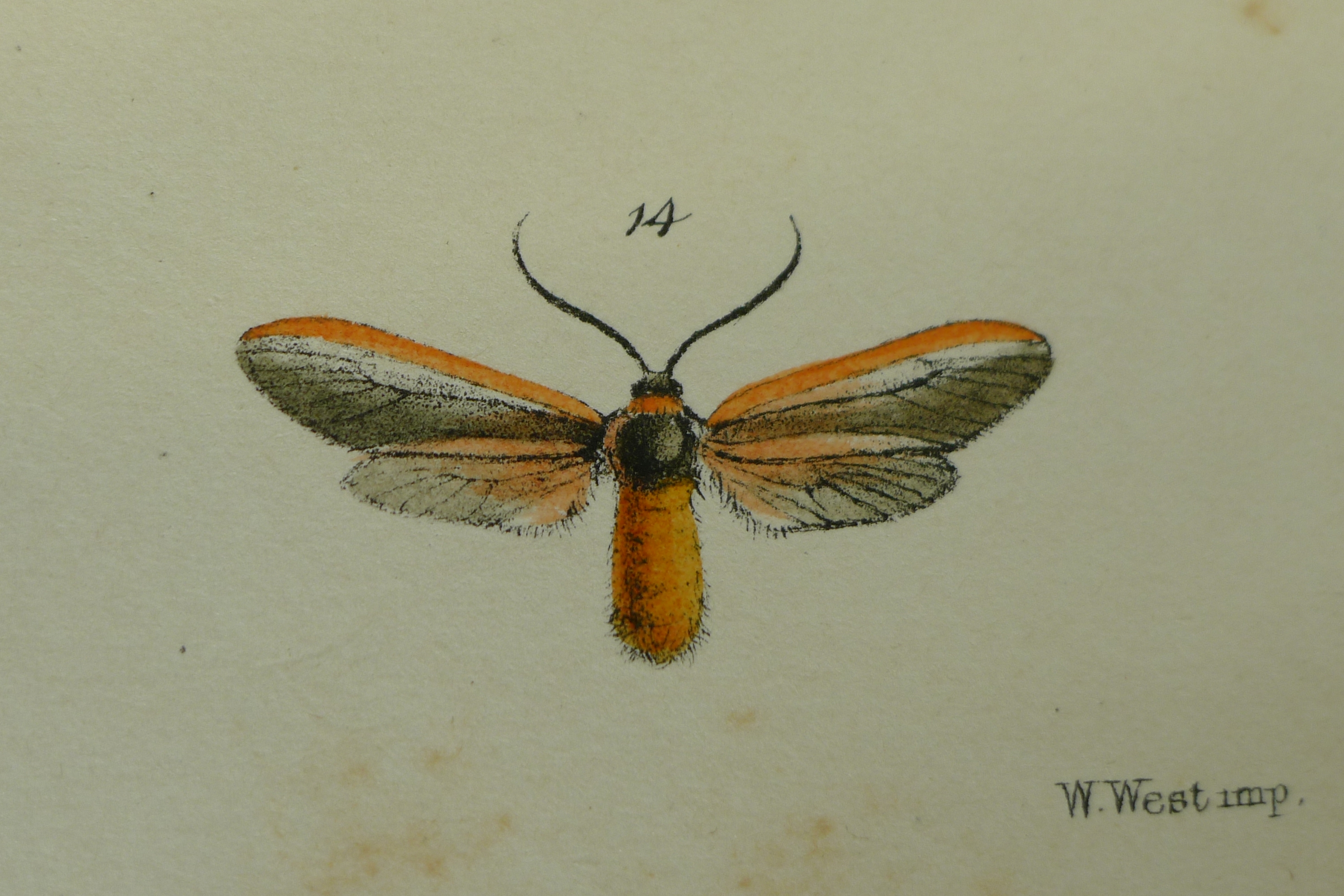

Scientific classification
- Kingdom: Animalia
- Phylum: Arthropoda
- Clade: Pancrustacea
- Class: Insecta
- Order: Lepidoptera
- Family: Phaudidae
- Genus: Phauda
- Species: P. mahisa

Binomial name
- Phauda mahisa Moore, 1858

= Phauda mahisa =

Species of moth

Phauda mahisa is a species of moth in the Phaudidae family. It is found on Java in Indonesia.
