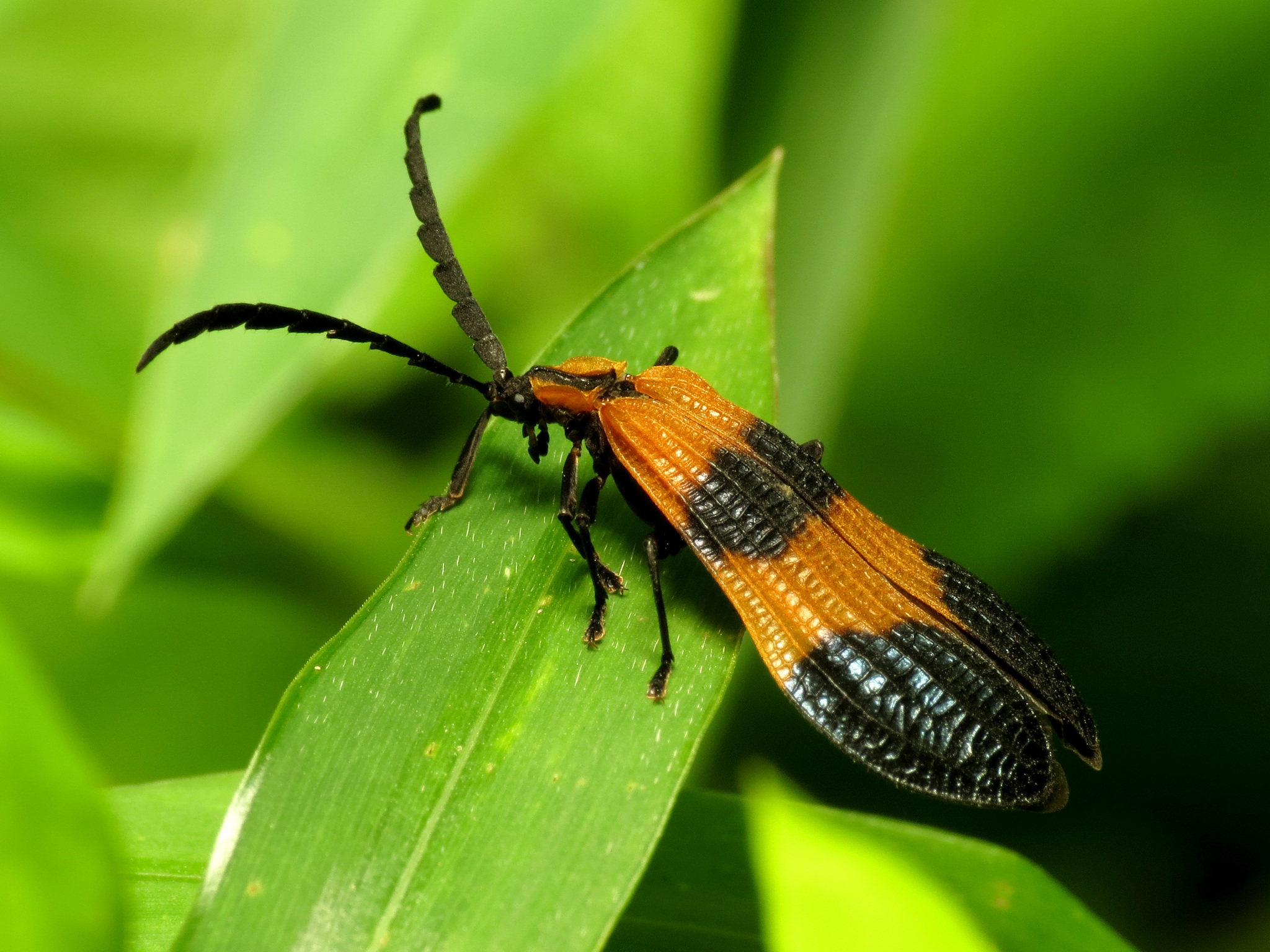

Scientific classification
- Kingdom: Animalia
- Phylum: Arthropoda
- Clade: Pancrustacea
- Class: Insecta
- Order: Coleoptera
- Suborder: Polyphaga
- Infraorder: Elateriformia
- Family: Lycidae
- Genus: Calopteron
- Species: C. terminale

Binomial name
- Calopteron terminale (Say, 1823)

= Calopteron terminale =

Species of beetle

Calopteron terminale, the end band net-wing, is a species of net-winged beetle in the family Lycidae. It is found in North America.

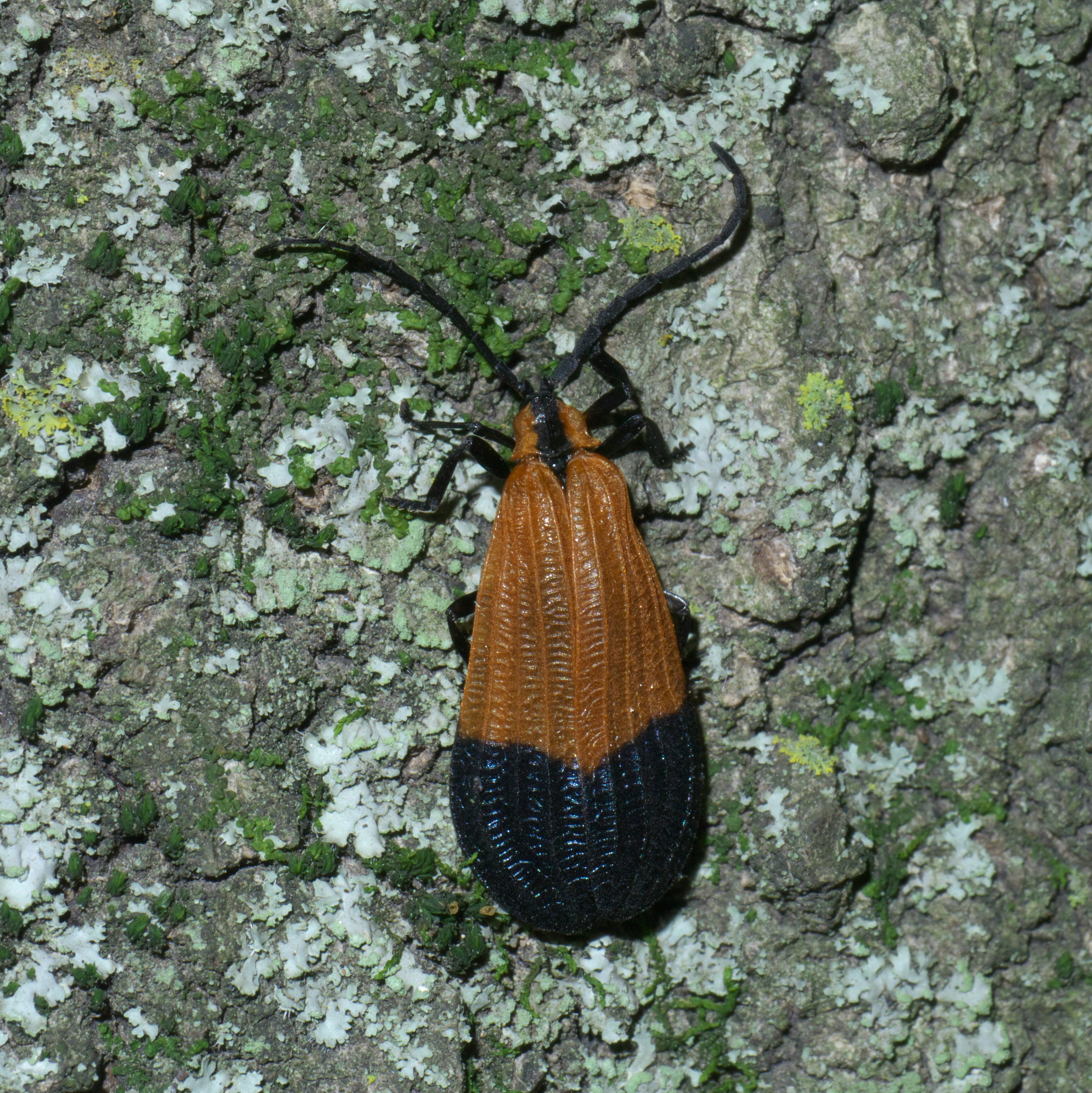

Calopteron terminale is distinguished from other members of Calopteron by its "transverse depression across the elytra". It is found in woodlands, particularly in eastern North American deciduous forests. iNaturalist users most frequently observe this species between July and September. The eggs are deposited on dead and dying trees; after hatching the larvae then prey on small arthropods under the bark.
