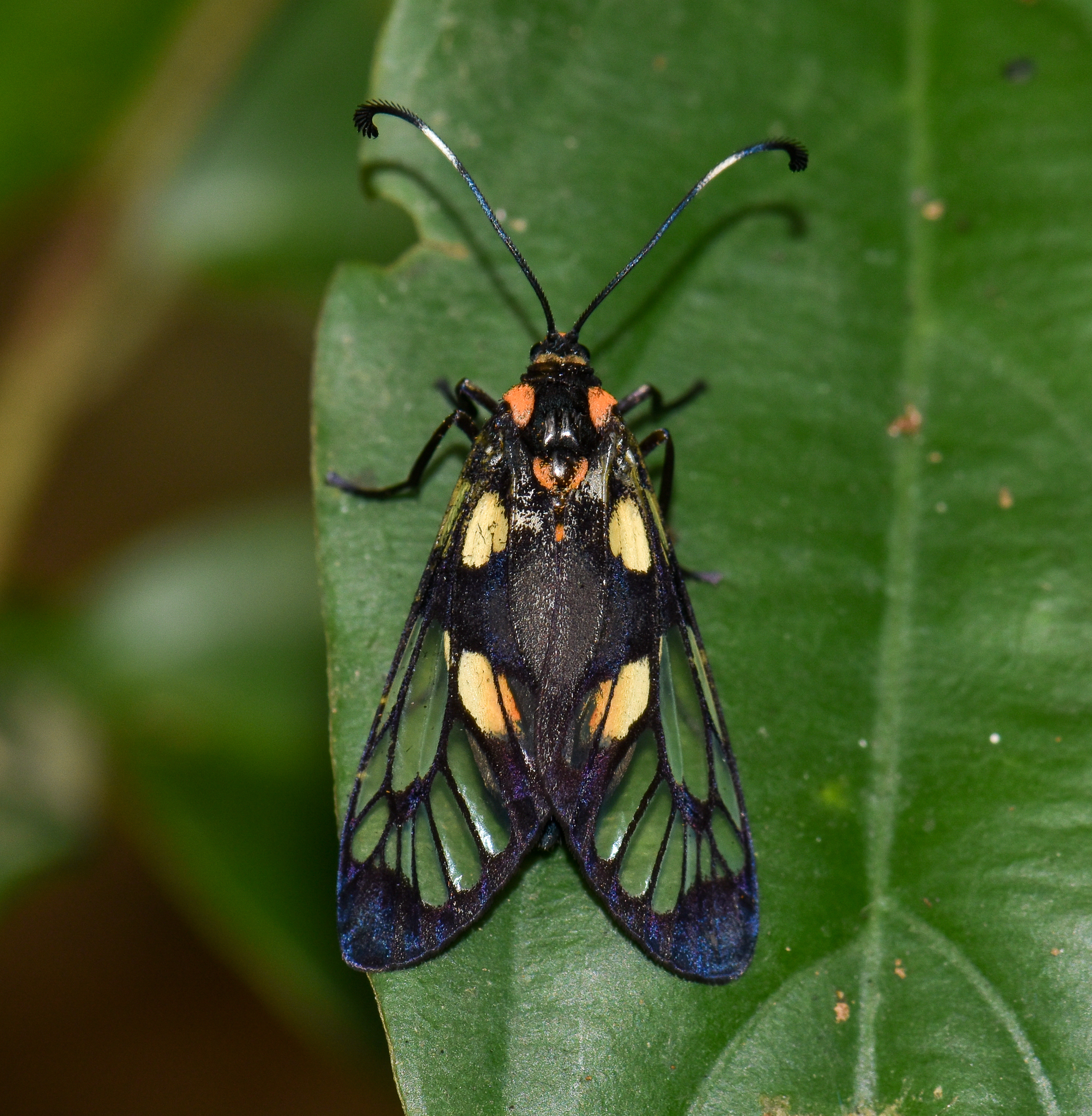

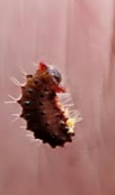

Scientific classification
- Domain: Eukaryota
- Kingdom: Animalia
- Phylum: Arthropoda
- Class: Insecta
- Order: Lepidoptera
- Family: Zygaenidae
- Genus: Trypanophora
- Species: T. semihyalina

Binomial name
- Trypanophora semihyalina Kollar, 1844

= Trypanophora semihyalina =

Species of moth

Trypanophora semihyalina is a species of moth in the family Zygaenidae. It is found in south-east Asia, including India, China, Hong Kong and parts of Taiwan.

The larvae have been recorded feeding on Barringtonia acutangula, Bombax ceiba, Careya, Carissa carandas, Gardenia, Holarrhena, Lagerstroemia (including Lagerstroemia indica and Lagerstroemia speciosa), Ricinus communis, Rosa, Shorea robusta, Terminalia (including Terminalia catappa and Terminalia tomentosa) and Ziziphus (including Ziziphus mauritiana).
