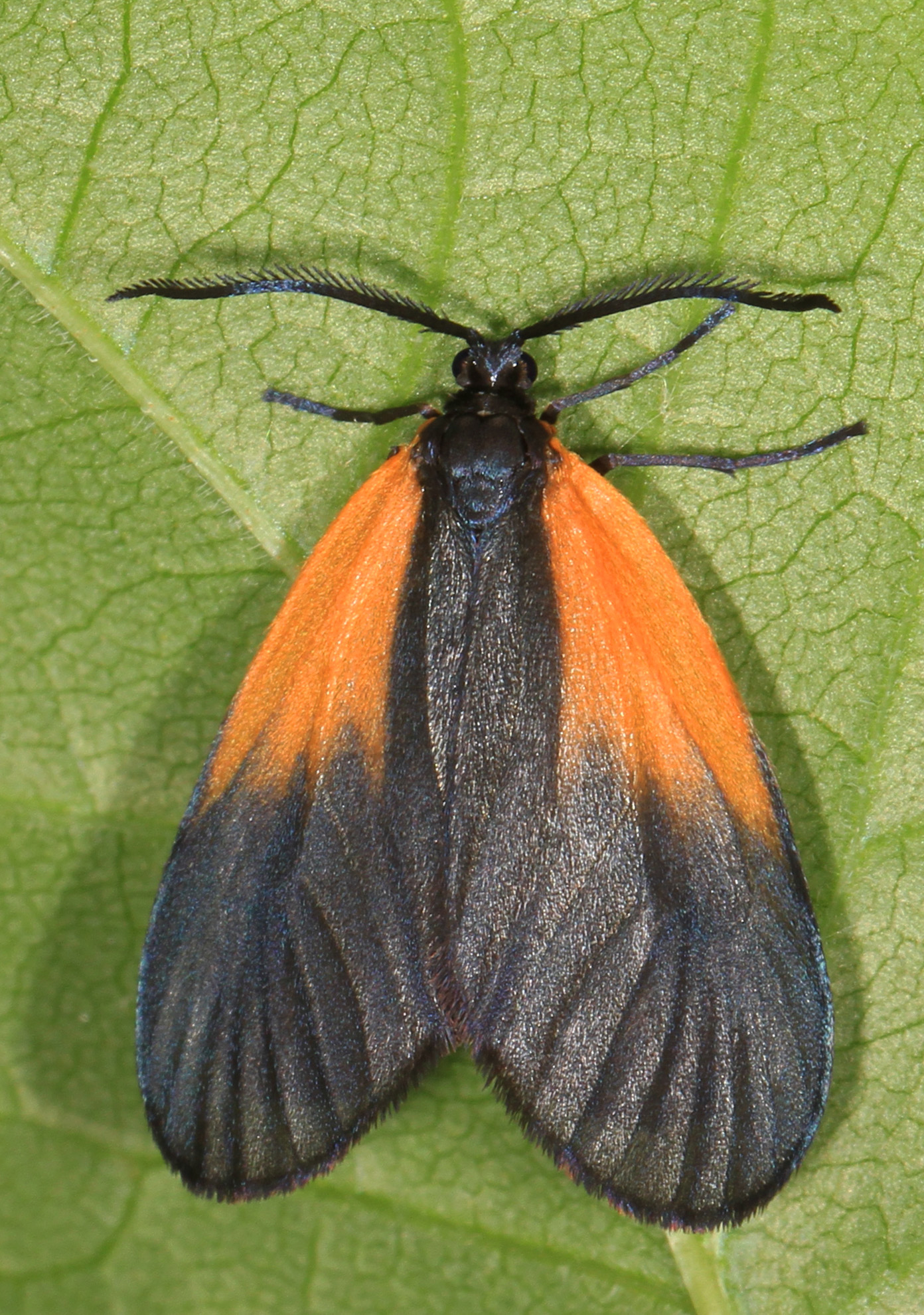

Scientific classification
- Domain: Eukaryota
- Kingdom: Animalia
- Phylum: Arthropoda
- Class: Insecta
- Order: Lepidoptera
- Family: Zygaenidae
- Genus: Pyromorpha
- Species: P. dimidiata

Binomial name
- Pyromorpha dimidiata Herrich-Schäffer, 1854

Synonyms
- Malthaca perlucidula Clemens, 1860

= Pyromorpha dimidiata =

Species of moth

Pyromorpha dimidiata, the orange-patched smoky moth, is a species of leaf skeletonizer moth of the family Zygaenidae found in eastern North America.

== Description ==
=== Adults ===
Adult wings are typically held horizontally over the abdomen when at rest. The forewings have two solid color regions: (1) dark gray, sometimes with a blue sheen, in the terminal half of the wing and in the basal half only near the inner margin, and (2) orange in the basal half of the wing except near the inner margin.

Adults can be confused with adults of the unrelated black-and-yellow lichen moth (Lycomorpha pholus in the family Erebidae), which has a similar two-toned forewing pattern but a later, summer flight period. Adults of both moth species also resemble the net-winged beetles of the genus Calopteron.

== Range ==
The species' occurrence range extends from Mississippi, Oklahoma, and Missouri in the west to Florida, New York, and Rhode Island in the east.

== Life cycle ==
=== Adults ===
Adults have been reported from March to August, with most sightings in May and June.
