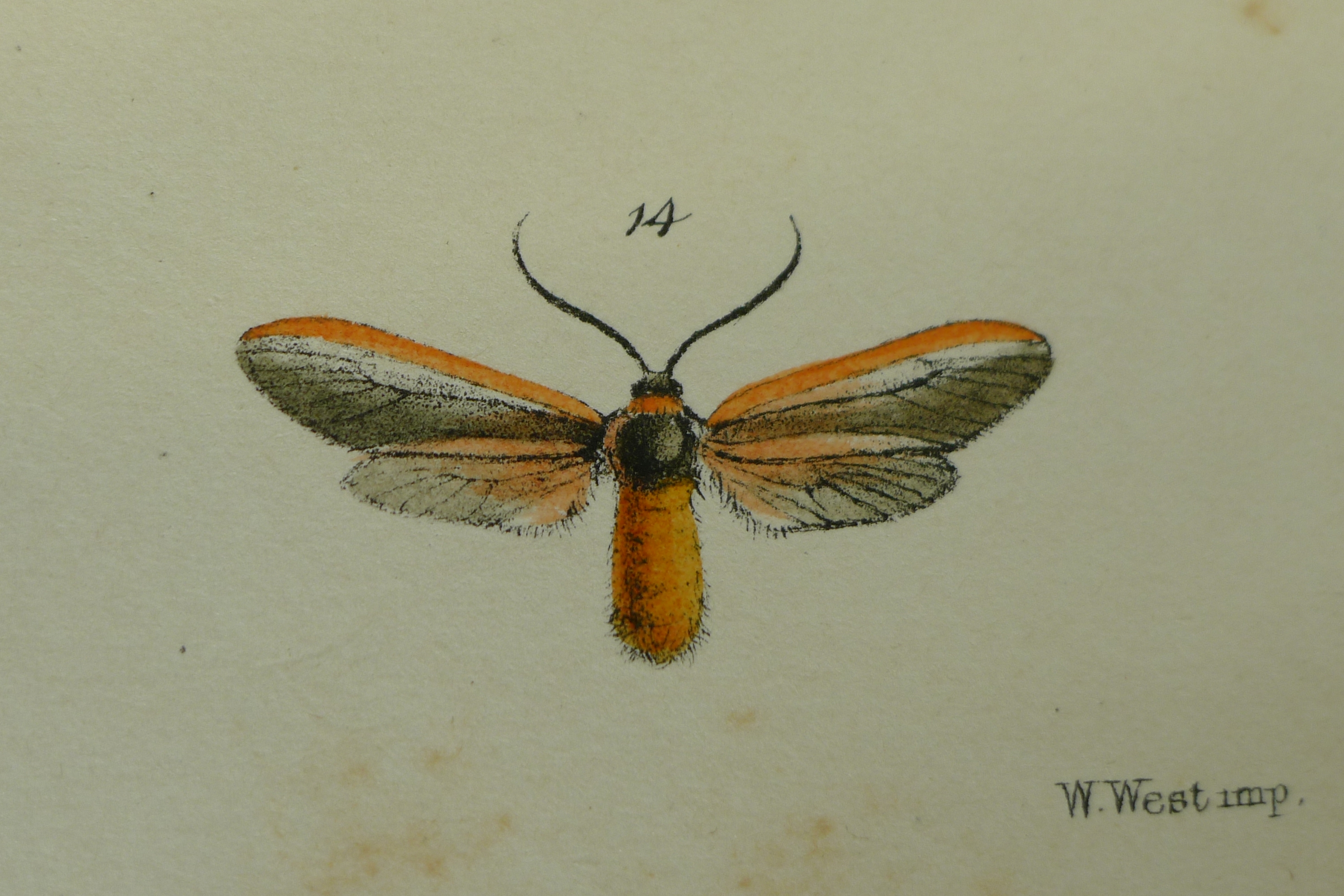
- Phauda mahisa

Scientific classification
- Kingdom: Animalia
- Phylum: Arthropoda
- Clade: Pancrustacea
- Class: Insecta
- Order: Lepidoptera
- Superfamily: Zygaenoidea
- Family: Phaudidae; Kirby, 1892

= Phaudidae =

Family of moths

The Phaudidae are a family of moths. Species occur from India to East and Southeast Asia, and include Phauda flammans, a significant horticultural pest on Ficus spp. trees in China, Vietnam, Thailand and India. Formerly known as subfamily Phaudinae within the Zygaenidae, it has since been elevated to the taxonomic rank of family, with phylogenetic research placing the family as sister group to the Zygenidae within superfamily Zygenoidea.

== Taxonomic history ==
Phaudidae was established as subfamily Phaudinae within the Zygaenidae in 1892 by William Forsell Kirby. Elevation to the rank of family was proposed in 1998 by Harald Fänger et al. Phylogenetic research in 2006 and 2010 supports placement outside Zygenidae, and most though not all subsequent authors have followed this placement. Further phylogenetic research in the 2020s confirms placement outside the Zygenidae, finding the Phaudidae as sister group to the Zygenidae, and the grouping (Phaudidae+Zygaenidae) as sister group to the Limacodidae.

== Distribution ==
Species occur from India east to Southeast and East Asia.

== Genera ==
- Alophogaster Hampson, 1892
- Phauda Walker, 1854
- Phaudopsis Hampson, 1900
