= Callizygaena albipuncta =

Scientific classification
- Kingdom: Animalia
- Phylum: Arthropoda
- Class: Insecta
- Order: Lepidoptera
- Family: Zygaenidae
- Genus: Callizygaena
- Species: C. albipuncta

Binomial name
- Callizygaena albipuncta (Hampson, 1900)

Synonyms
- Lamprochloe albipuncta Hampson, 1900

Species of moth

Callizygaena albipuncta is a moth in the Zygaenidae family. It was described by George Hampson in 1900 from Sri Lanka. The species of this genus are found in India and Sri Lanka.
