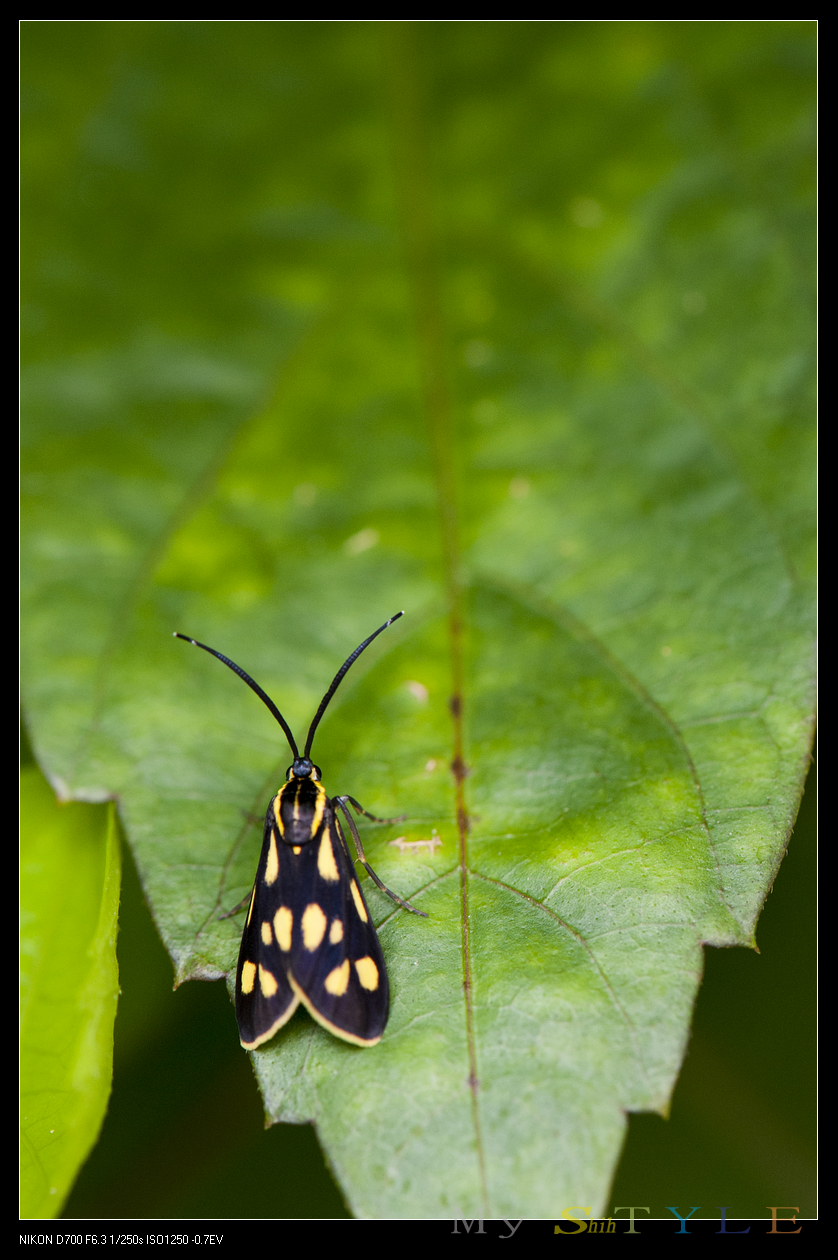

Scientific classification
- Domain: Eukaryota
- Kingdom: Animalia
- Phylum: Arthropoda
- Class: Insecta
- Order: Lepidoptera
- Family: Zygaenidae
- Genus: Artona
- Species: A. hainana

Binomial name
- Artona hainana Butler, 1876

Synonyms
- Balataea hainana Butler, 1876

= Artona hainana =

Species of moth

Artona hainana is a species of moth in the family Zygaenidae. It is found in Taiwan, China, India, Thailand, Singapore and Malaysia.
