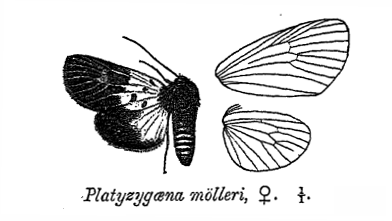
- PlatyzygaenaMoelleri.

Scientific classification
- Domain: Eukaryota
- Kingdom: Animalia
- Phylum: Arthropoda
- Class: Insecta
- Order: Lepidoptera
- Family: Zygaenidae
- Genus: Platyzygaena; Swinhoe, 1892

= Platyzygaena =

Genus of moths

Platyzygaena is a genus of moths belonging to the family Zygaenidae.

== Species ==
Species:

- Platyzygaena melaleuca Jordan, 1907
- Platyzygaena moelleri Elwes, 1890
