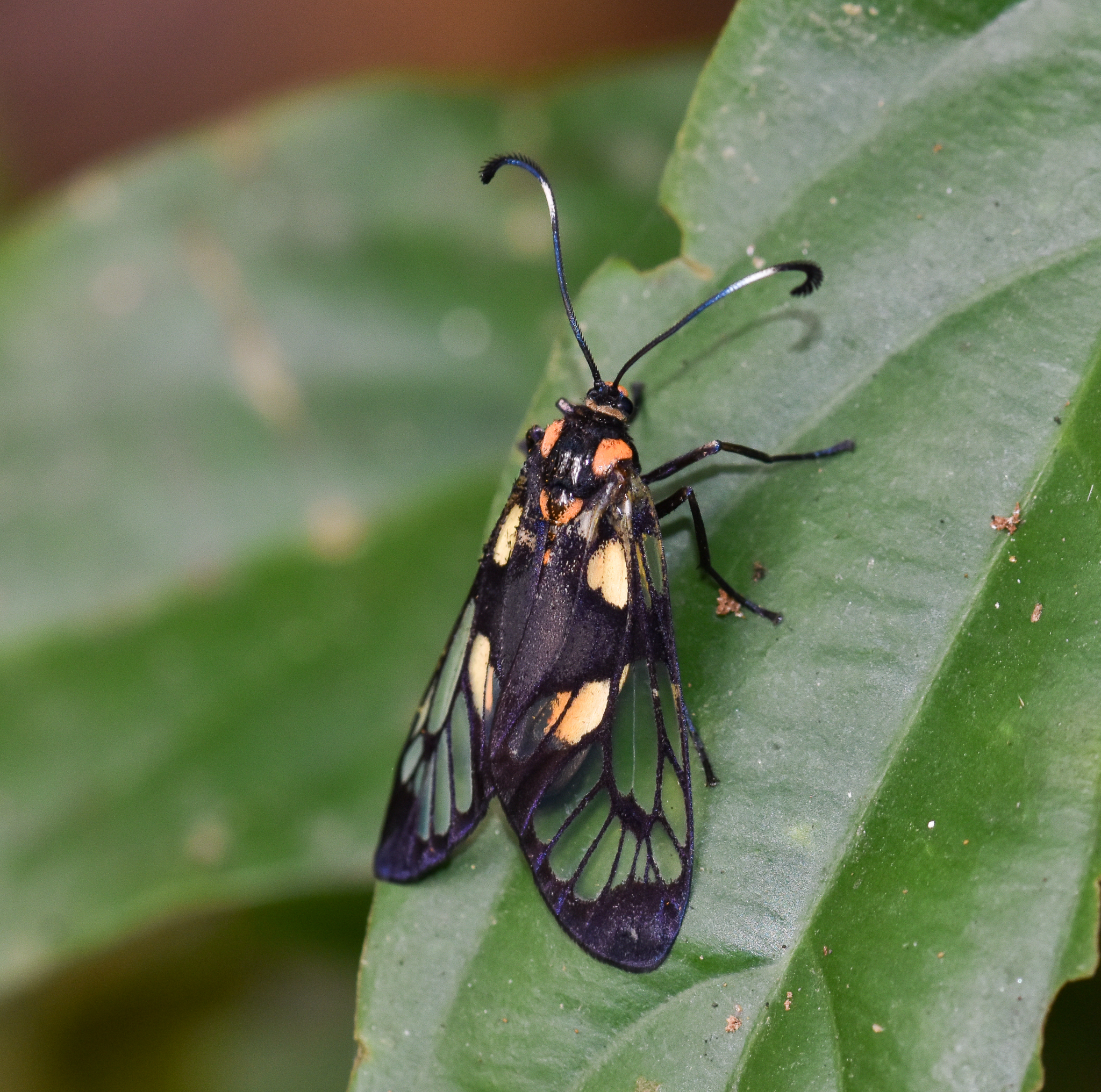
- Trypanophora semihyalina

Scientific classification
- Domain: Eukaryota
- Kingdom: Animalia
- Phylum: Arthropoda
- Class: Insecta
- Order: Lepidoptera
- Family: Zygaenidae
- Subfamily: Chalcosiinae
- Genus: Trypanophora; Kollar, 1844

Synonyms
- Tryphanonophora Bryk, 1936; Tryphanophora Piepers & Snellen, 1903

= Trypanophora =

Genus of moths

Trypanophora is a genus of moths of the Zygaenidae family.

== Selected species ==
- Trypanophora semihyalina Kollar, 1844
- Trypanophora trapobanes Walker, 1854
