= Xenares (Peloponnesian War) =

Thucydides mentions the name Xenares (Ancient Greek: Ξενάρης) on two separate occasions in his account of the Peloponnesian War, most likely referring to two different Spartans rather than the same individual.

== Xenares the Ephor ==
In 421 B.C., Xenares served as one of the ephors of Sparta and opposed the Peace of Nicias, the treaty intended to halt hostilities between Athens and Sparta. Together with his colleague Cleobulus, he sought to undermine the treaty by influencing Sparta's allies, especially the Boeotians and Corinthians.

During the winter, after diplomatic embassies from Sparta, Athens, Boeotia, and Corinth failed to reach agreement, Xenares and Cleobulus privately advised the Boeotians to first ally with Argos and then bring Argos and themselves into Sparta's alliance. The Lacedaemonians hoped that such a friendship would facilitate the conduct of the war outside the Peloponnese. They also requested that the Boeotians place Panactum in Sparta's hands so that it might be exchanged for Pylos, giving Sparta greater freedom to resume hostilities against Athens.

When the Boeotian envoys met Argive officials, they were pleased to find that Argos independently proposed the same alliance Sparta desired, which the Boeotarchs approved. However, the supreme councils of Boeotia, unaware of the ephors instructions, refused to agree, fearing it would offend Sparta. Consequently, the preliminary alliances stalled, and the scheme ultimately failed.

== Xenares (son of Cnidis) ==
In the winter of 420 B.C., Xenares, son of Cnidis, a Spartan commander at the Spartan colony of Heraclea in Trachinia, faced a coalition of hostile local tribes, the Aenianians, Dolopians, Malians, and some Thessalians, who had long opposed and harassed the town. In the ensuing battle, the coalition defeated the Spartans, and Xenares was killed. The defeat left Heraclea severely weakened, and shortly afterward the Boeotians occupied the town, sending away the Spartan governor Agesippidas, fearing Athenian interference while Sparta was distracted with Peloponnesian affairs.
