= Gaedea =

Scientific classification
- Domain: Eukaryota
- Kingdom: Animalia
- Phylum: Arthropoda
- Class: Insecta
- Order: Lepidoptera
- Family: Zygaenidae
- Genus: Gaedea; Hering, 1924

Genus of moths

Gaedea is a genus of moths belonging to the family Zygaenidae.

== Species ==
Species:

- Gaedea separata Hering, 1925
