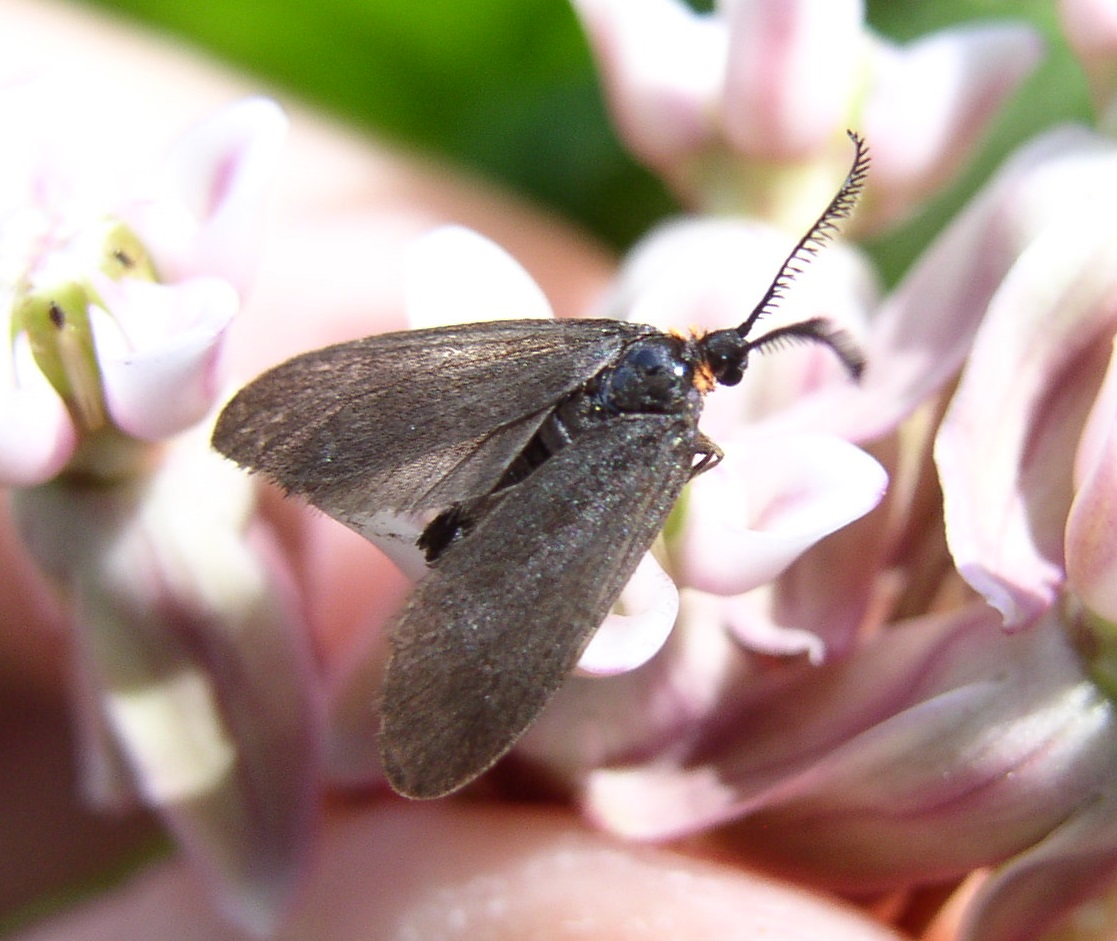
- Acoloithus falsarius

Scientific classification
- Domain: Eukaryota
- Kingdom: Animalia
- Phylum: Arthropoda
- Class: Insecta
- Order: Lepidoptera
- Family: Zygaenidae
- Subfamily: Procridinae
- Genus: Acoloithus; Clemens, 1860

= Acoloithus =

Genus of moths

Acoloithus is a genus of moths of the family Zygaenidae.

== Species ==
- Acoloithus falsarius Clemens, 1860
- Acoloithus novaricus Barnes & McDunnough, 1913
- Acoloithus rectarius Dyar, 1898
