= Phaudopsis =

Scientific classification
- Kingdom: Animalia
- Phylum: Arthropoda
- Class: Insecta
- Order: Lepidoptera
- Family: Phaudidae
- Genus: Phaudopsis; Hampson, 1900

Genus of moths

Phaudopsis is a genus of moths of the family Phaudidae.

== Species ==
- Phaudopsis igneola Hampson, 1900
