= Alophogaster =

Scientific classification
- Kingdom: Animalia
- Phylum: Arthropoda
- Class: Insecta
- Order: Lepidoptera
- Family: Phaudidae
- Genus: Alophogaster; Hampson, 1893

Genus of moths

Alophogaster is a genus of moths of the Phaudidae family.

== Species ==
- Alophogaster ludius Jordan, 1925
- Alophogaster melli Hering, 1925
- Alophogaster overdijkinki Joicey & Talbot, 1925
- Alophogaster rubribasis Hampson, 1892
- Alophogaster serraticornis Hampson, 1896
- Alophogaster tensipennis Walker, 1862
