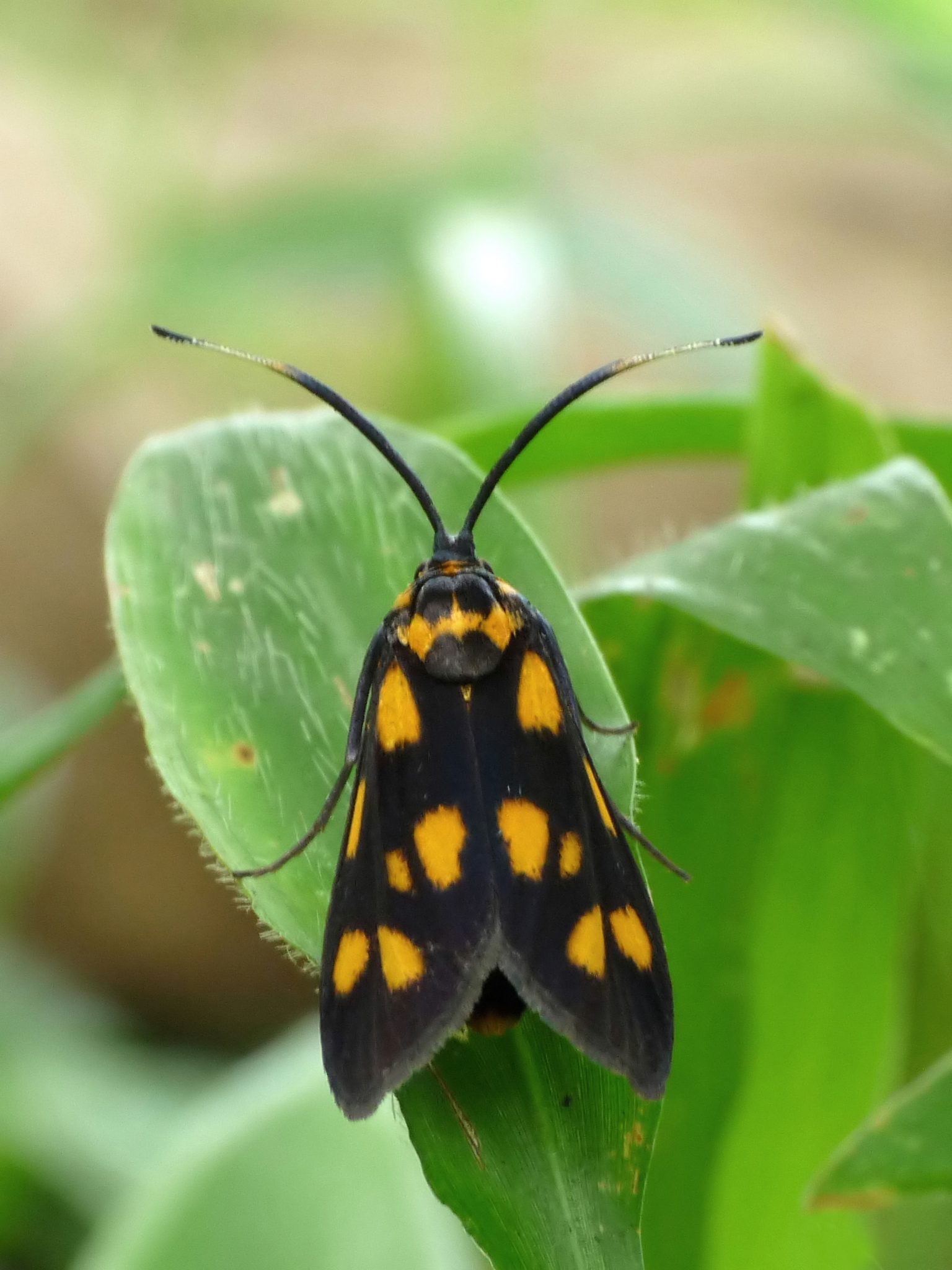
- Balataea sp.

Scientific classification
- Kingdom: Animalia
- Phylum: Arthropoda
- Class: Insecta
- Order: Lepidoptera
- Family: Zygaenidae
- Subfamily: Procridinae
- Genus: Artona; Walker, 1854

Synonyms
- Zeuxippa Herrich-Schäffer, 1855; Rhaphidognatha C. Felder & R. Felder, 1862; Bintha Walker, [1865]; Balatea Bryk, 1936

= Artona =

Genus of moths

Artona is a genus of moths of the family Zygaenidae.

== Selected species ==
- Subgenus Artona
  - Artona flavipuncta
  - Artona fulvida
  - Artona hainana
  - Artona superba
- Subgenus Balataea Walker, [1865]
  - Artona angusta (Alberti, 1954)
  - Artona cuneonotata (Leech, 1898)
  - Artona elegantior (Alberti, 1954)
  - Artona funeralis (Butler, 1879)
  - Artona gracilis (Walker, [1865])
    - Artona gracilis gracilis (Walker, [1865])
    - Artona gracilis taiwana Wileman, 1911
  - Artona intermediana (Alberti, 1954)
  - Artona kimurai M. Owada & Inada, 2005
  - Artona martini Efetov, 1997
  - Artona octomaculata (Bremer, 1861)
  - Artona parilis Efetov, 1997
  - Artona uniformis (Alberti, 1954)
  - Artona walkeri (Moore, 1859)
- Subgenus Pseudosesidia Alberti, 1954
  - Artona aegeriaeformis Alberti, [1954]
