= Cerodendra =

Scientific classification
- Kingdom: Animalia
- Phylum: Arthropoda
- Class: Insecta
- Order: Lepidoptera
- Family: Zygaenidae
- Genus: Cerodendra; Tremewan, 1973

Synonyms
- Dendrocera Hampson, 1893 (Preocc.)

Genus of moths

Cerodendra is a genus of moths belonging to the family Zygaenidae.

== Species ==
- Cerodendra bipuncta (Hampson, 1895)
- Cerodendra quadripunctata (Hampson, 1893)
