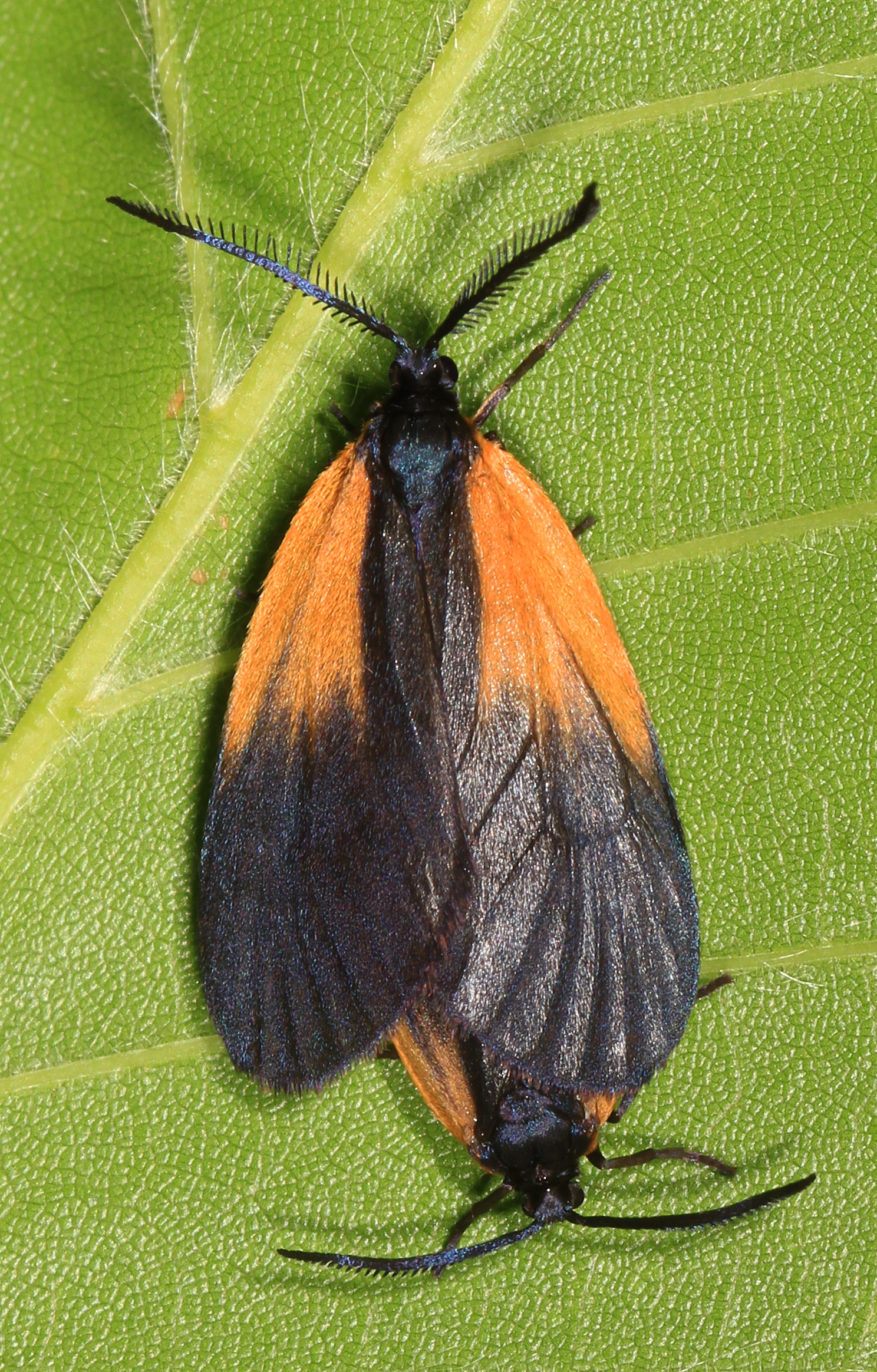

Scientific classification
- Domain: Eukaryota
- Kingdom: Animalia
- Phylum: Arthropoda
- Class: Insecta
- Order: Lepidoptera
- Family: Zygaenidae
- Subfamily: Procridinae
- Genus: Pyromorpha; Herrich-Schäffer, [1854]

Synonyms
- Malthaca Clemens, 1860; Gingla Walker, [1865]; Acreagris Felder, 1874 (preocc. Acreagris Koch & Berendt, 1854); Felderia Kirby, 1892 (preocc. Felderia Walsingham, 1887); Coementa Druce, 1885

= Pyromorpha =

Genus of moths

Pyromorpha is a genus of moths of the family Zygaenidae. Currently species are found in North and Central America.

== Species ==
- Pyromorpha caelebs Blanchard, 1972
- Pyromorpha centralis (Walker, 1854)
- Pyromorpha contermina (H. Edwards, 1884)
- Pyromorpha correbioides (Felder, 1874)
- Pyromorpha dimidiata Herrich-Schäffer, [1854] – orange-patched smoky moth
- Pyromorpha fusca H. Edwards, 1884
- Pyromorpha josialis (Druce, 1885)
- Pyromorpha marginata (H. Edwards, 1884)
- Pyromorpha martenii (French, 1883)
- Pyromorpha mexicana (Druce, 1884)
- Pyromorpha morio (Druce, 1885)
- Pyromorpha radialis (Walker, [1865])
- Pyromorpha rata (H. Edwards, 1882)
- Pyromorpha thyesta (Druce, 1884)
- Pyromorpha timon (Druce, 1885)
