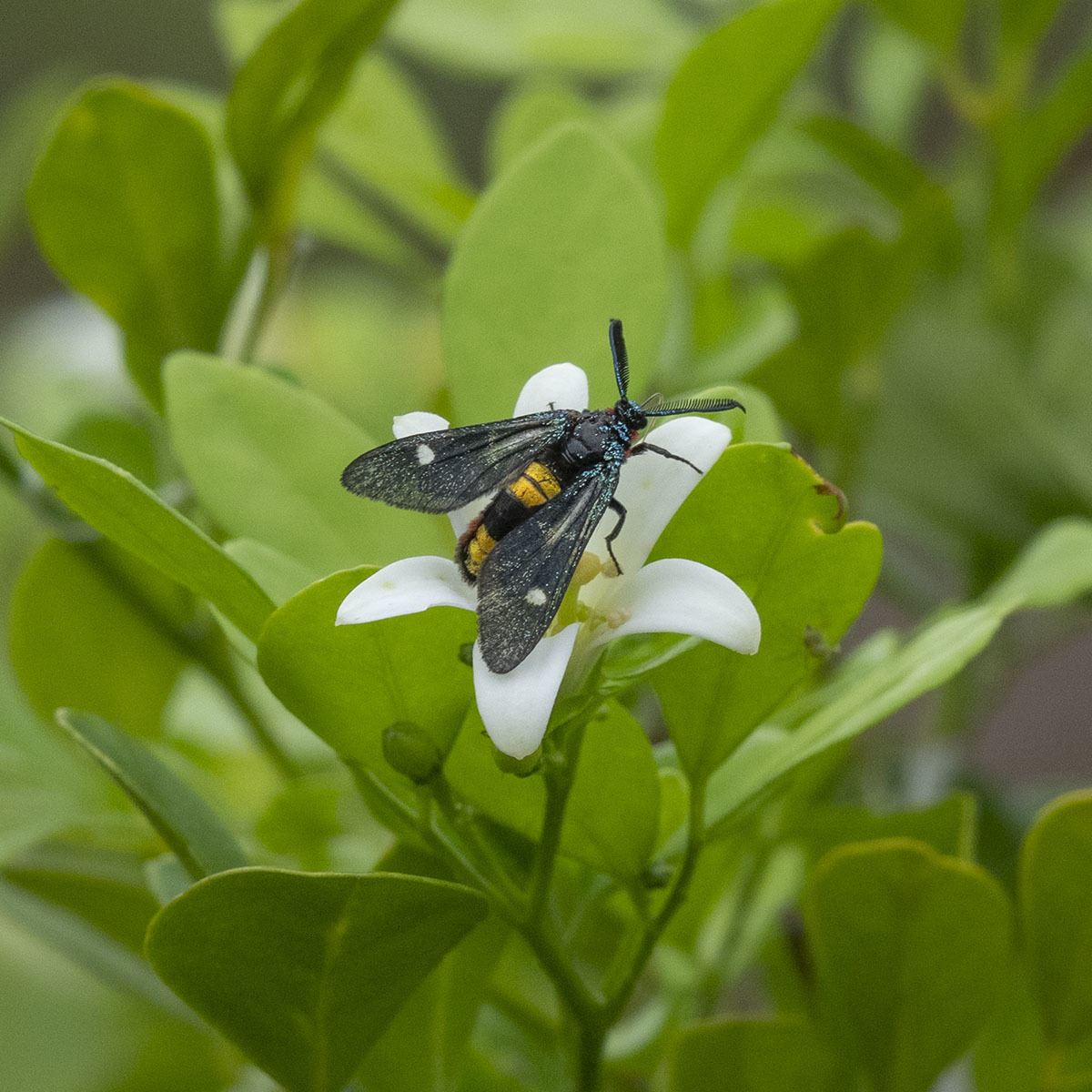
- Callizygaena auratus

Scientific classification
- Kingdom: Animalia
- Phylum: Arthropoda
- Class: Insecta
- Order: Lepidoptera
- Family: Zygaenidae
- Subfamily: Callizygaeninae
- Genus: Callizygaena; Felder, 1874

= Callizygaena =

Genus of moths

Callizygaena is a genus of moths belonging to the family Zygaenidae.

The species of this genus are found in India and Sri Lanka.

== Species ==
Species:

- Callizygaena ada Butler, 1892
- Callizygaena albipuncta Hampson, 1900
- Callizygaena amabilis Jordan, 1907
- Callizygaena auratus (Cramer, 1779)
- Callizygaena aurifasciata Hering, 1922
- Callizygaena defasciata Hering, 1928
- Callizygaena flaviplaga Hering, 1925
- Callizygaena glaucon Semper, 1896
- Callizygaena luzonensis Schultze, 1925
- Callizygaena semperi Druce, 1892
- Callizygaena unipuncta Swinhoe, 1904
- Callizygaena venusta Jordan, 1912
