= Harrisinopsis =

Scientific classification
- Domain: Eukaryota
- Kingdom: Animalia
- Phylum: Arthropoda
- Class: Insecta
- Order: Lepidoptera
- Family: Zygaenidae
- Genus: Harrisinopsis; Jordan, 1913

Genus of moths

Harrisinopsis is a genus of moths belonging to the family Zygaenidae.

== Species ==
Species:

- Harrisinopsis robusta Jordan, 1913
