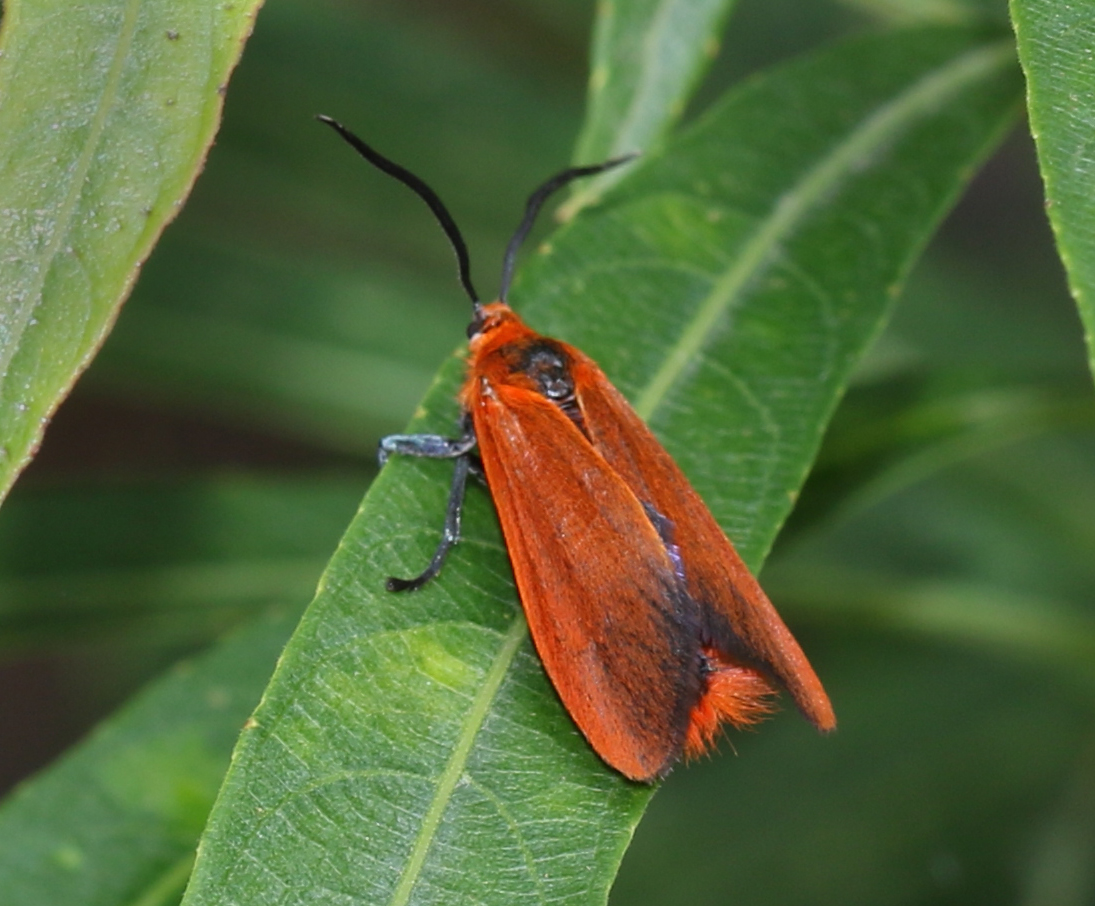

Scientific classification
- Kingdom: Animalia
- Phylum: Arthropoda
- Class: Insecta
- Order: Lepidoptera
- Family: Phaudidae
- Genus: Phauda; Walker, 1854

= Phauda =

Genus of moths

Phauda is a genus of moths in the family Phaudidae.

== Species ==
- Phauda arikana Matsumura, 1911
- Phauda bicolor Fibiger, Larsen & Buchsbaum, 2010
- Phauda defluiteri Roepke, 1943
- Phauda dichroa Jordan, 1907
- Phauda dimidiata Snellen, 1879
- Phauda enigma Hering, 1925
- Phauda eos de Joannis, 1910
- Phauda erythra Jordan, 1907
- Phauda flammans Walker, 1854
- Phauda fortunii Herrich-Schäffer, 1854
- Phauda fuscalis Swinhoe, 1892
- Phauda horishana Matsumura, 1927
- Phauda kantonensis Mell, 1922
- Phauda lanceolata Jordan, 1907
- Phauda limbata Wallengren, 1861
- Phauda mahisa Moore, 1858
- Phauda mimica Strand, 1915
- Phauda pratti Leach, 1890
- Phauda rubra Jordan, 1907
- Phauda similis Hering, 1925
- Phauda sumatrensis Walker, 1864
- Phauda triadum Walker, 1854
