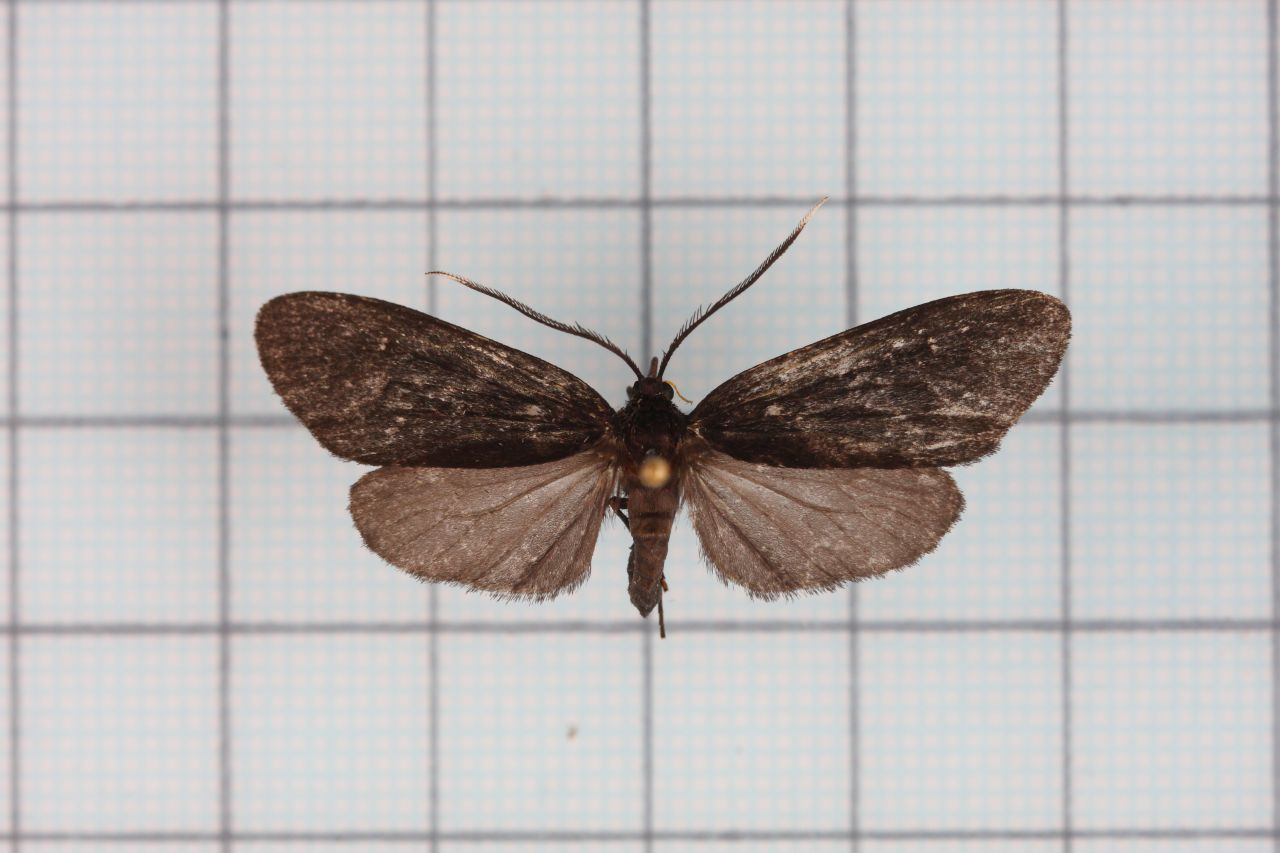
- Female
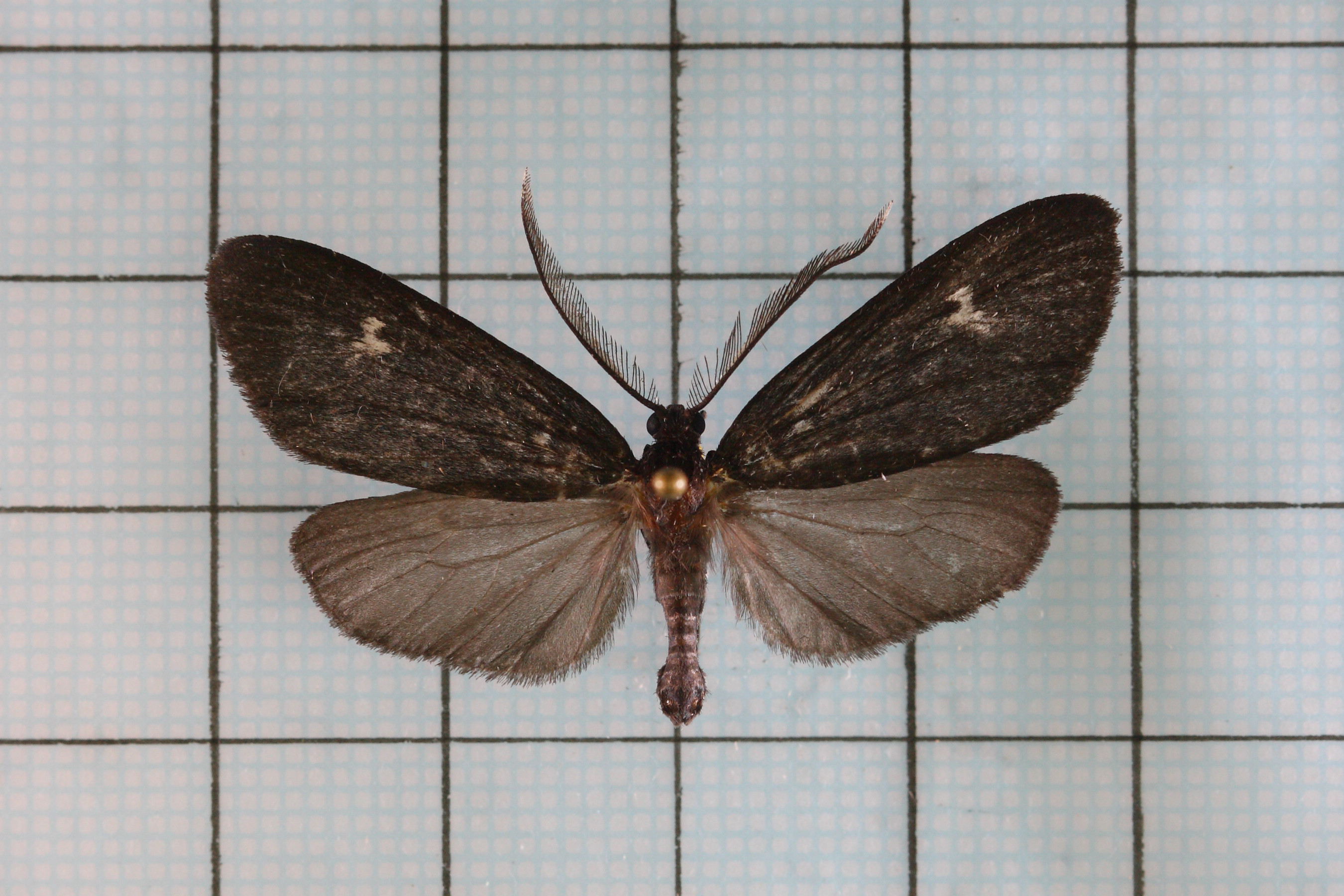
- Male

Scientific classification
- Domain: Eukaryota
- Kingdom: Animalia
- Phylum: Arthropoda
- Class: Insecta
- Order: Lepidoptera
- Family: Zygaenidae
- Subfamily: Procridinae
- Genus: Morionia; Jordan, 1910
- Species: M. sciara

Binomial name
- Morionia sciara Jordan, 1910

= Morionia =

Genus of moths

Morionia is a genus of moths of the family Zygaenidae. It consists of only one species, Morionia sciara, which is found in Taiwan.
