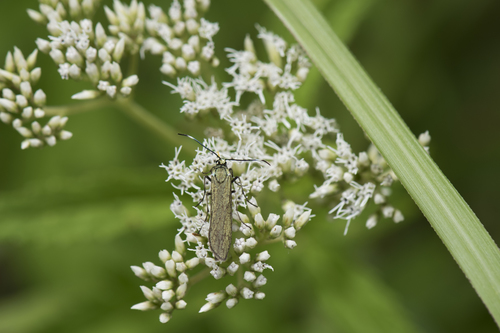

Scientific classification
- Domain: Eukaryota
- Kingdom: Animalia
- Phylum: Arthropoda
- Class: Insecta
- Order: Lepidoptera
- Family: Zygaenidae
- Subfamily: Procridinae
- Genus: Arachotia; Moore, 1879

= Arachotia =

Genus of moths

Arachotia is a genus of moths of the family Zygaenidae, with species described from regions of Indochina and Southeast Asia.

== Species ==
- Arachotia aenea Jordan, 1908, the Philippines
- Arachotia dadongshan Owada et Wang, 2021, China
- Arachotia euglenia Jordan, 1908
- Arachotia flaviplaga Moore, 1879, India
- Arachotia hohuanshanensis Shih et Owada, 2021, central Taiwan
- Arachotia hyalina Hering, 1925
- Arachotia quadricolor (Semper, 1898), the Philippines
- Arachotia nanling Owada et Wang, 2021, southern China
- Arachotia sapa Owada et Pham, 2021, northern Vietnam
- Arachotia tamdao Owada et Pham, 2021, northern Vietnam
- Arachotia vespoides Moore, 1879, India
