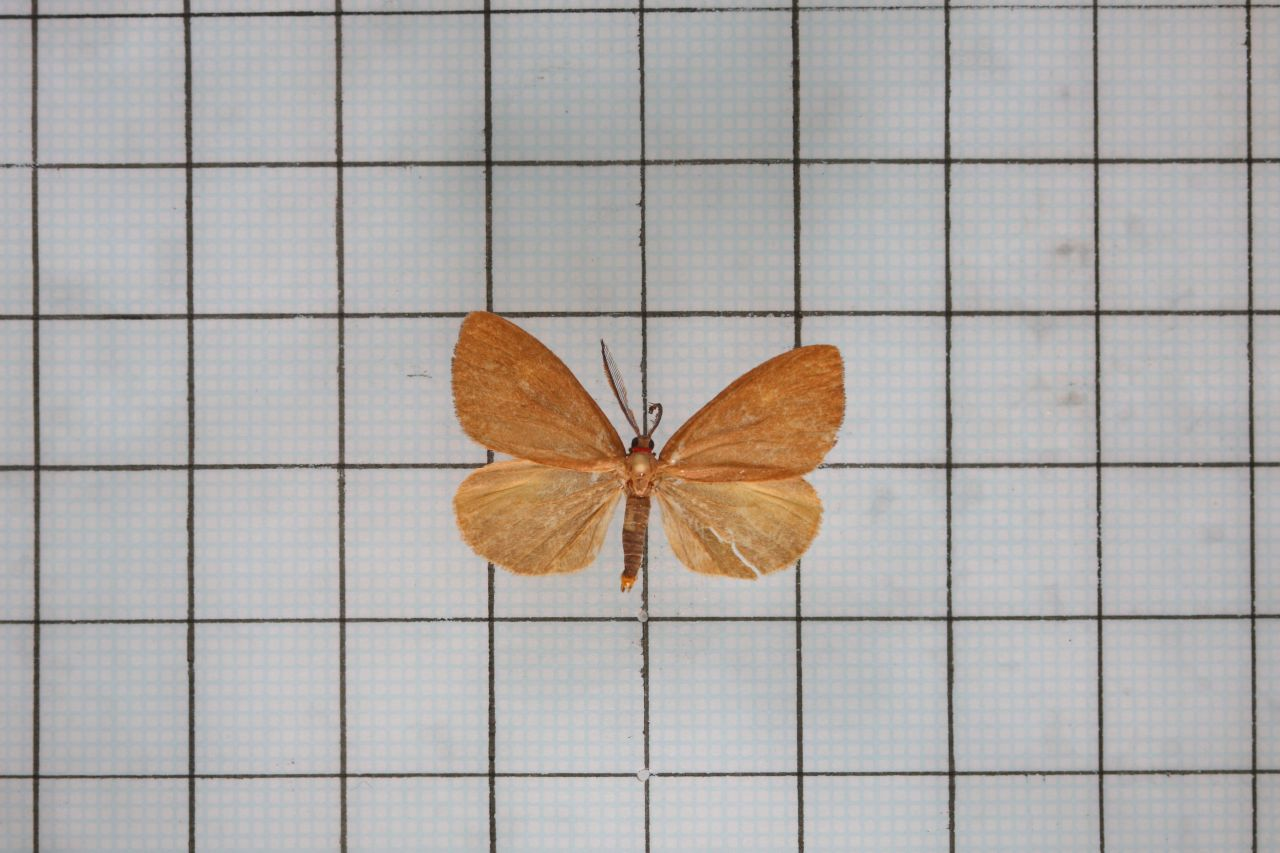
- Arbudas submacula

Scientific classification
- Domain: Eukaryota
- Kingdom: Animalia
- Phylum: Arthropoda
- Class: Insecta
- Order: Lepidoptera
- Family: Zygaenidae
- Subfamily: Chalcosiinae
- Genus: Arbudas; Moore, 1879

Synonyms
- Kubia Matsumura

= Arbudas =

Genus of moths

Arbudas is a genus of moths in the family Zygaenidae.

== Species ==
- Arbudas bicolor Moore, 1879 – from Vietnam, India.
- Arbudas funerea Jordan, 1907 – from China (Hainan)
- Arbudas leno C. Swinhoe, 1900 – from Taiwan and India
- Arbudas melanoleuca Tarmann, 1992 – from Vietnam
- Arbudas rubricollum Alberti, 1954 – from China
- Arbudas submacula Wileman, 1910 – from Taiwan
- Arbudas tobaensis Tarmann, 1992 – from Sumatra
