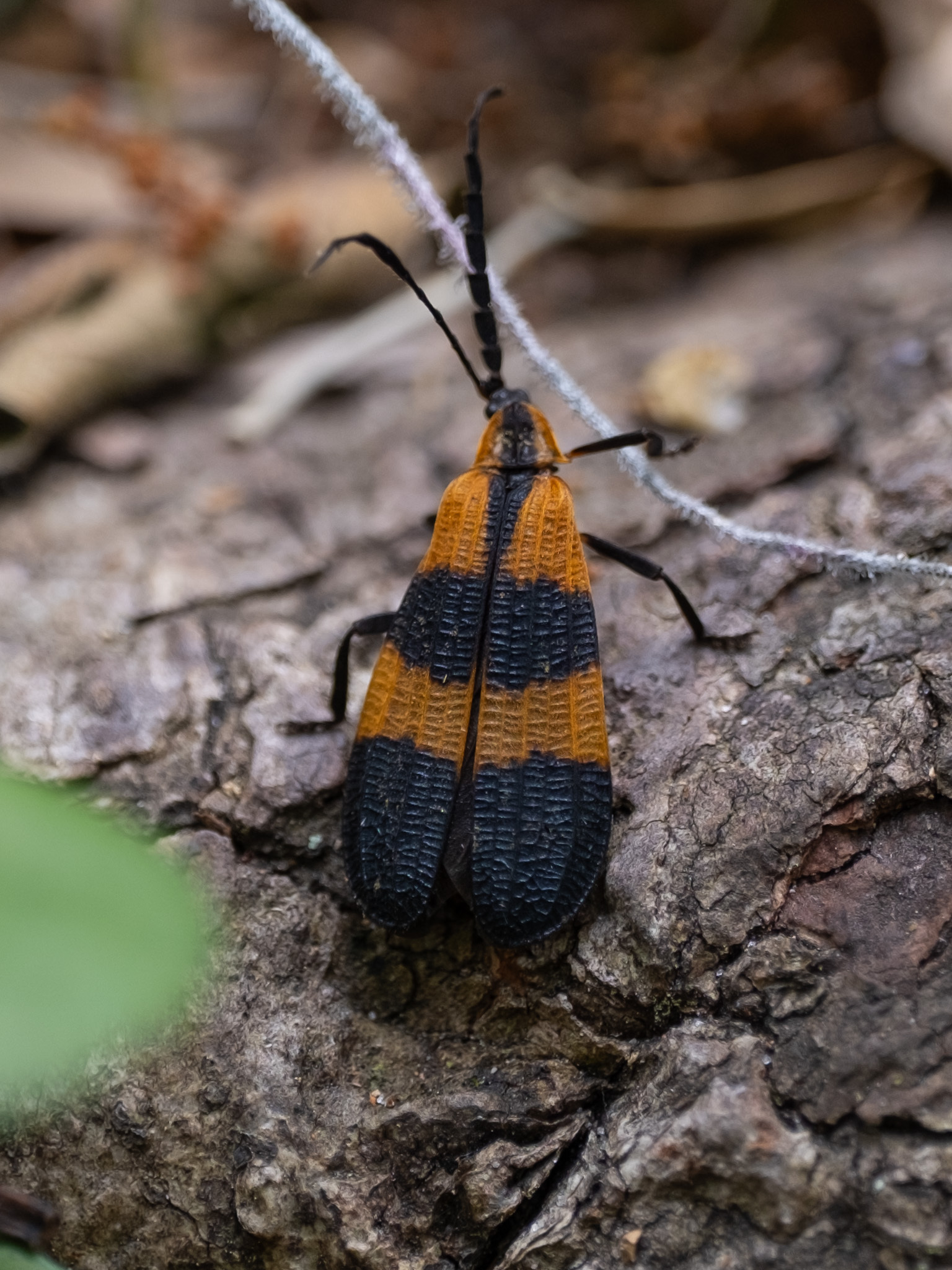

Scientific classification
- Kingdom: Animalia
- Phylum: Arthropoda
- Clade: Pancrustacea
- Class: Insecta
- Order: Coleoptera
- Suborder: Polyphaga
- Infraorder: Elateriformia
- Family: Lycidae
- Genus: Calopteron
- Species: C. discrepans

Binomial name
- Calopteron discrepans (Newman, 1838)

= Calopteron discrepans =

Species of beetle

Calopteron discrepans, the banded net-winged beetle, is a species of net-winged beetle in the family Lycidae. It is found in North America.

== Distribution ==
The banded net-winged beetle, Calopteron discrepans (Newman), is distributed across the eastern United States, ranging from New England south to Florida and west to Oklahoma and Kansas. Recently, some banded net-winged beetles have been found as far north as Manitoba and Quebec, extending the area of their geographical range.

== Physical description ==
Calopteron beetles exhibit subtle variations in appearance, with three distinct species identified in North America and Northern Mexico. Among these species, Calopteron discrepans and Calopteron reticulatum are notably similar in their external morphology. Their appearance is nearly identical and characterized by a degree of variability, making differentiation between the two species challenging. However, subtle distinctions can be observed primarily based on the coloration of the metasternum and the second antennal segment, providing key features necessary for species identification.

== Life cycle ==
=== Adults ===
These beetles typically range in length from approximately 10 to 15 mm, with females being larger than males. The elytra display elevated lengthwise ridges and cross ridges, a common feature among lycids, and are predominantly orange with distinct black banding patterns. The median and terminal black bands on the elytra contribute to their striking appearance. The pronotum is black on the top with small strips of fulvous along the sides. The sutural extension of the median black band is expanded basally and is widest at the scutellum and forms a right angle with the anterior part of the band. The ventral surface of the aedeagus has a cap which protects the seminal orifice distally. Notably, the banding patterns of C. discrepans closely resemble those of the closely related species Calopteron reticulatum. Another distinction is that the metasternum and second antennal joint are totally black in C. discrepans whereas the metasternum of C. reticulatum is more or less reddish-brown antero-medially. Furthermore, the second antennal segment is fulvous or brown in C. discrepans. Despite these subtle differences, distinguishing between these two species can pose challenges, especially for those unfamiliar with their intricate characteristics. Moreover, there is a third species, Calopteron terminale, with which C. discrepans is often confused. C. terminale typically lacks the median black band on the elytra, a distinguishing feature often seen in C. discrepans. Additionally, when viewed from the side, the elytra of C. terminale exhibit a wavy appearance with a small depression anterior to the apical band. If a median band is present in C. terminale, it is not produced along the suture toward the bases of the elytra, further adding to the complexity of species differentiation.

=== Larvae ===
The larvae of Calopteron discrepans are characterized by a dark black coloration with burnt-orange patches, contributing to their distinct appearance within their habitat. This distinct coloration aids in their camouflage and provides protection against potential predators as they navigate their environment in search of prey or suitable habitat for development.

=== Pupa ===
During the pupal stage, Calopteron larvae aggregate in large numbers, forming shingled masses containing hundreds of pupae. This behavior observed in Calopteron species plays a crucial role in their ecological dynamics and potential adaptive strategies. The reasons for this aggregative behavior are not yet fully understood, but it is believed that factors like environmental cues or aggregation pheromones play a role. These aggregations provide a communal defense mechanism against predators and environmental stressors, enhancing the survival rate of the developing pupae. Additionally, the formation of these aggregations likely serves as a strategy to optimize resource utilization and increase the efficiency of pupal development, ensuring the successful transition to adulthood.

== Habitat ==
Calopteron larvae are primarily found inhabiting various microhabitats within their preferred ecosystems, which are primarily moist woods. These larvae predominantly reside in environments such as rotten logs, under loose bark, soil, or leaf litter. These habitats provide the best conditions for their development and sustenance, offering ample food and suitable substrate for pupation.

== Diet ==
The diet of Calopteron larvae is diverse, with reports indicating varied feeding habits. While some authors suggest that they are predacious, others suggest that they primarily feed on myxomycetes, fungi, or fermenting plant juices. This dietary versatility may contribute to their ecological success within their respective habitats.

== Social behavior ==
=== Pupation ===
Calopteron larvae exhibit interesting behavior during the pupation stage. This stage occurs within the last instar larval exuviae. The larvae of Calopteron discrepans form large aggregations during pupation. Some of these aggregations were seen to contain hundreds of pupae. This behavior has also been noticed in other species, such as C. terminale, C. reticulatum, and C. tropicum. However, in these three other species, the aggregation was in much smaller numbers. This behavior has been documented in different environmental settings, including laboratory observations and field studies. The reasons behind this aggregative behavior are not yet fully understood, but it is believed that factors such as environmental cues or aggregation pheromones may play a role. It is speculated that aggregation may serve other purposes, such as defense against predators, regulation of microclimatic conditions, and facilitation of mating opportunities. The communal nature of these aggregations may also confer social benefits, such as information exchange and resource sharing, which would contribute to the overall fitness and resilience of Calopteron populations in their natural habitats.

== Mating ==
Although a few mating pairs were observed near the aggregations, mating activity was not directly observed on the aggregated mass of pupae, nor was there clear evidence of male attendance to the pupae. In fact, the majority of resting adults observed on surrounding vegetation were not engaged in copulation. Consequently, it appears that male-female pairing is not a primary function of the pupal aggregations. However, further research is needed to fully understand the reproductive behavior and mating strategies of Calopteron species, including the role of pupal aggregations in facilitating mating opportunities and enhancing reproductive success.

== Defense ==
=== Aposematic coloration ===
The integument of Calopteron larvae displays bright, contrasting coloration, suggesting aposematic coloration. This coloration may serve as a warning to predators, indicating that the larvae are distasteful or harmful. Pupation occurs within the last instar larval exoskeleton, which retains the bright larval coloration. This likely provides shelter and additional aposematic benefits to the pupa, enhancing its overall survival and protection against potential threats in its environment.

=== Chemical defense ===
Calopteron beetles, particularly Calopteron reticulatum, have been found to contain defensive chemicals in their bodies. These include pyrazines, which contribute to the repugnant scent of the beetles, and lycidic acid along with other fatty acids that may render them distasteful to predators. The wings of these beetles have brittle ridges that rupture easily, releasing defensive chemicals. The fluid passing through the centers of these’s beetles ridges is noxious. When they feel threatened or are under attack, they release a noxious fluid from their leg joints, a process called reflex-bleeding. The striking colors of this beetle and the use of chemicals in their body serves as a defensive mechanism.

== Egg stage and oviposition ==
Not much is known of the egg stage and oviposition site of Calopteron species. However, the larvae of net-winged beetles, including Calopteron discrepans, are known to crawl under the bark of trees, serving as predators of small arthropods and consumers of rotting wood. This dual diet contributes to ecosystem services by aiding in the decomposition of trees, facilitating the carbon cycle. Upon reaching adulthood, net-winged beetle larvae congregate in large numbers on the surface of trees to pupate, a behavior believed to confer protective benefits through aposematic coloration inherited from the larvae stage.

== Mutualistic relationships ==
C. discrepans is known to engage in mutualistic relationships with various organisms, especially fungi and plants. One of the notable mutualistic interactions involves its association with fungi for larval development which allows for successful development within decaying wood substrates. The larvae aid in the dispersal of fungal spores while benefiting from the nutrient-rich environment provided by the fungi.

Additionally, C. discrepans exhibits mutualistic relationships with certain plant species. Adult beetles of C. discrepans are important pollinators for several plant species in their habitat. The beetles aid in pollination while obtaining nectar or pollen as a food source.

== Interactions with humans ==
Net-winged beetle larvae play a crucial role in ecosystem dynamics as both predators and decomposers. Under the protective cover of bark, they actively hunt small arthropods, contributing to natural pest control within their habitats. Additionally, these larvae consume rotting wood, participating in the decomposition process and facilitating nutrient cycling in forest ecosystems.
