= Procotes =

Scientific classification
- Kingdom: Animalia
- Phylum: Arthropoda
- Class: Insecta
- Order: Lepidoptera
- Family: Zygaenidae
- Subfamily: Procridinae
- Genus: Procotes; Butler, 1876
- Species: P. diminuta

Binomial name
- Procotes diminuta (Walker, 1854)

Synonyms
- Euchromia diminuta Walker, 1854

Genus of moths

Procotes is a monotypic moth genus in the Zygaenidae family described by Arthur Gardiner Butler in 1876. Its single species, Procotes diminuta, described by Francis Walker in 1854, is found in Sri Lanka.
