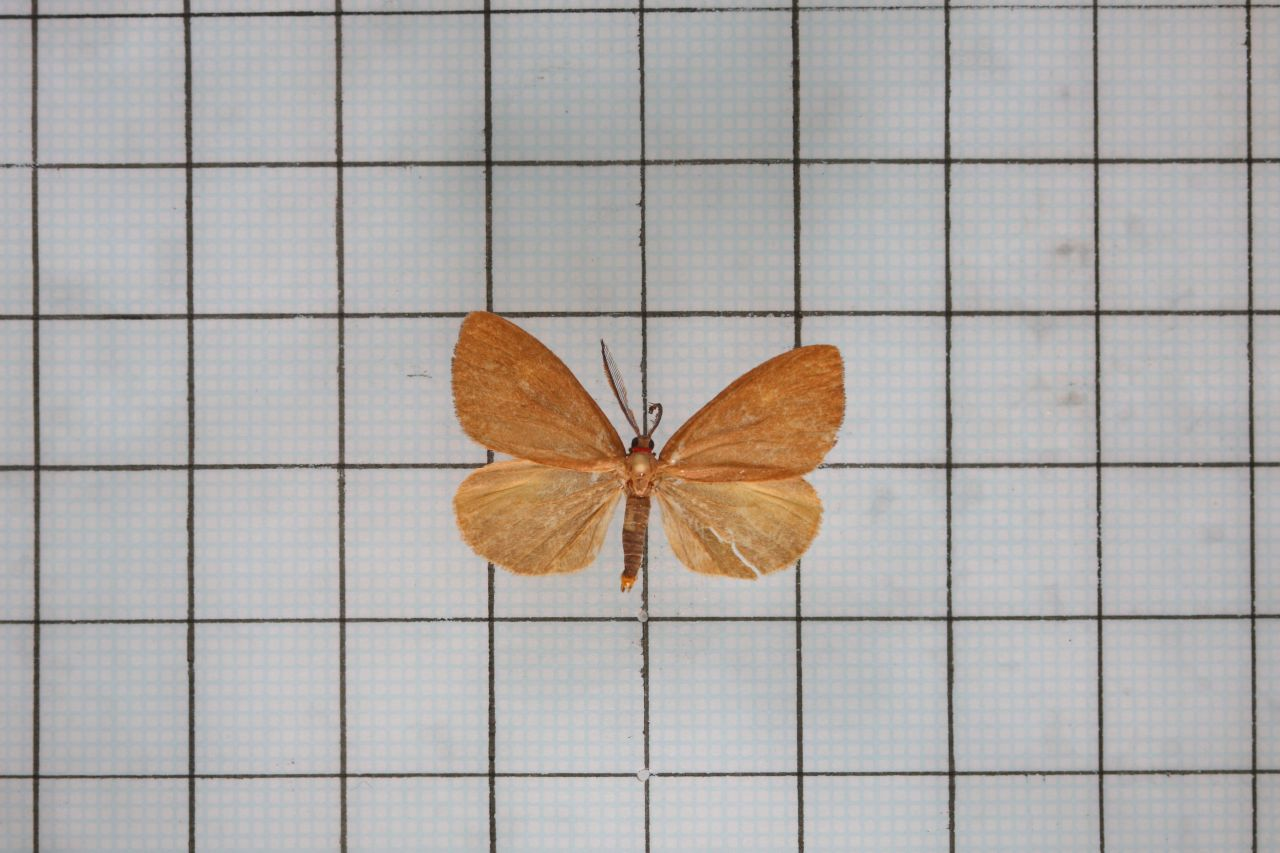

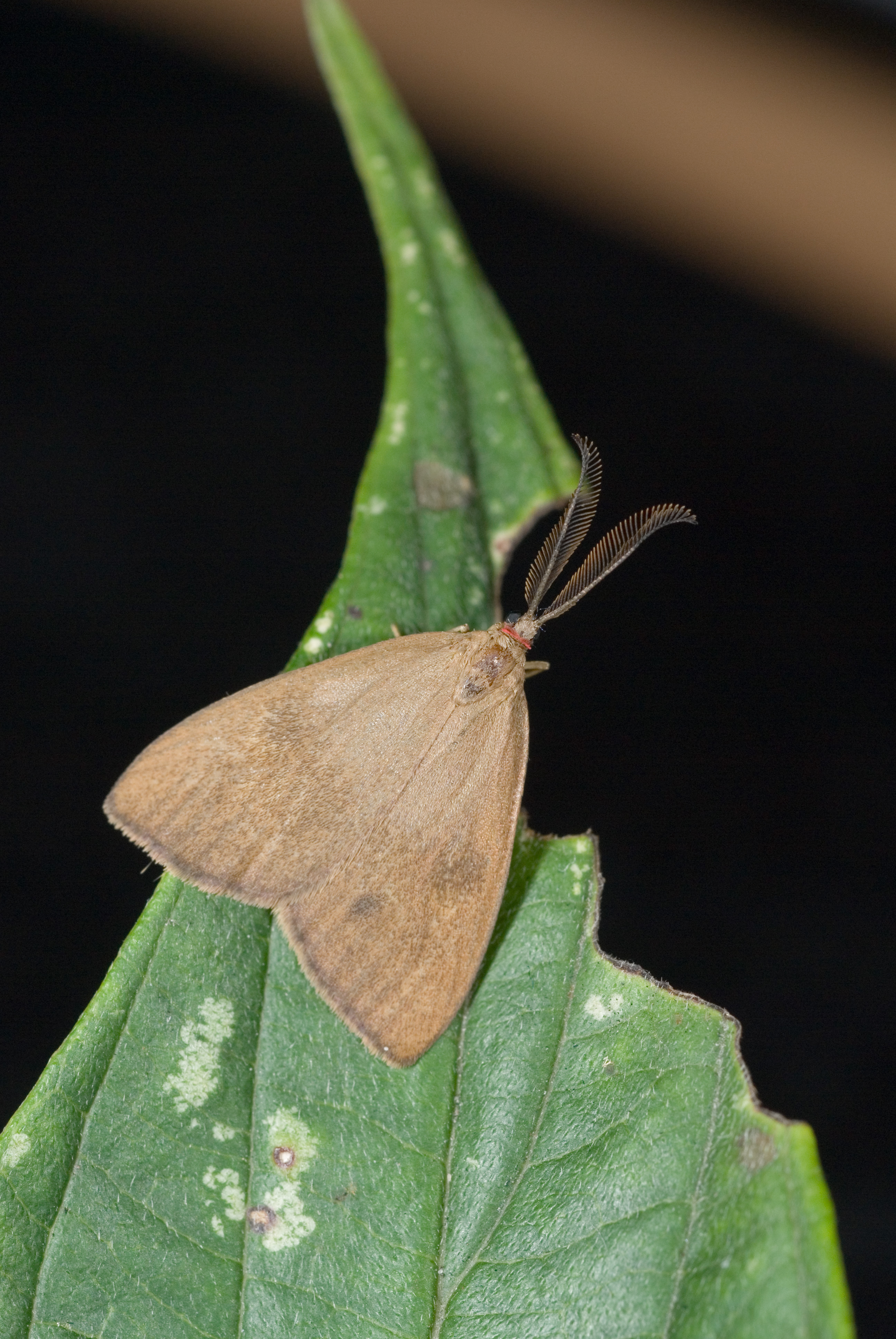

Scientific classification
- Domain: Eukaryota
- Kingdom: Animalia
- Phylum: Arthropoda
- Class: Insecta
- Order: Lepidoptera
- Family: Zygaenidae
- Genus: Arbudas
- Species: A. submacula

Binomial name
- Arbudas submacula (Wileman, 1910)

Synonyms
- Heteropan submacula Wileman, 1910

= Arbudas submacula =

Species of moth

Arbudas submacula is a moth of the family Zygaenidae. It is found in Taiwan.
