= Epizygaenella =

Scientific classification
- Kingdom: Animalia
- Phylum: Arthropoda
- Class: Insecta
- Order: Lepidoptera
- Family: Zygaenidae
- Genus: Epizygaenella; Tremewan & Povolny, 1968

Genus of moths

Epizygaenella is a genus of moths belonging to the family Zygaenidae.

The species of this genus are found in Central Asia.

== Species ==
Species:

- Epizygaenella caschmirensis
