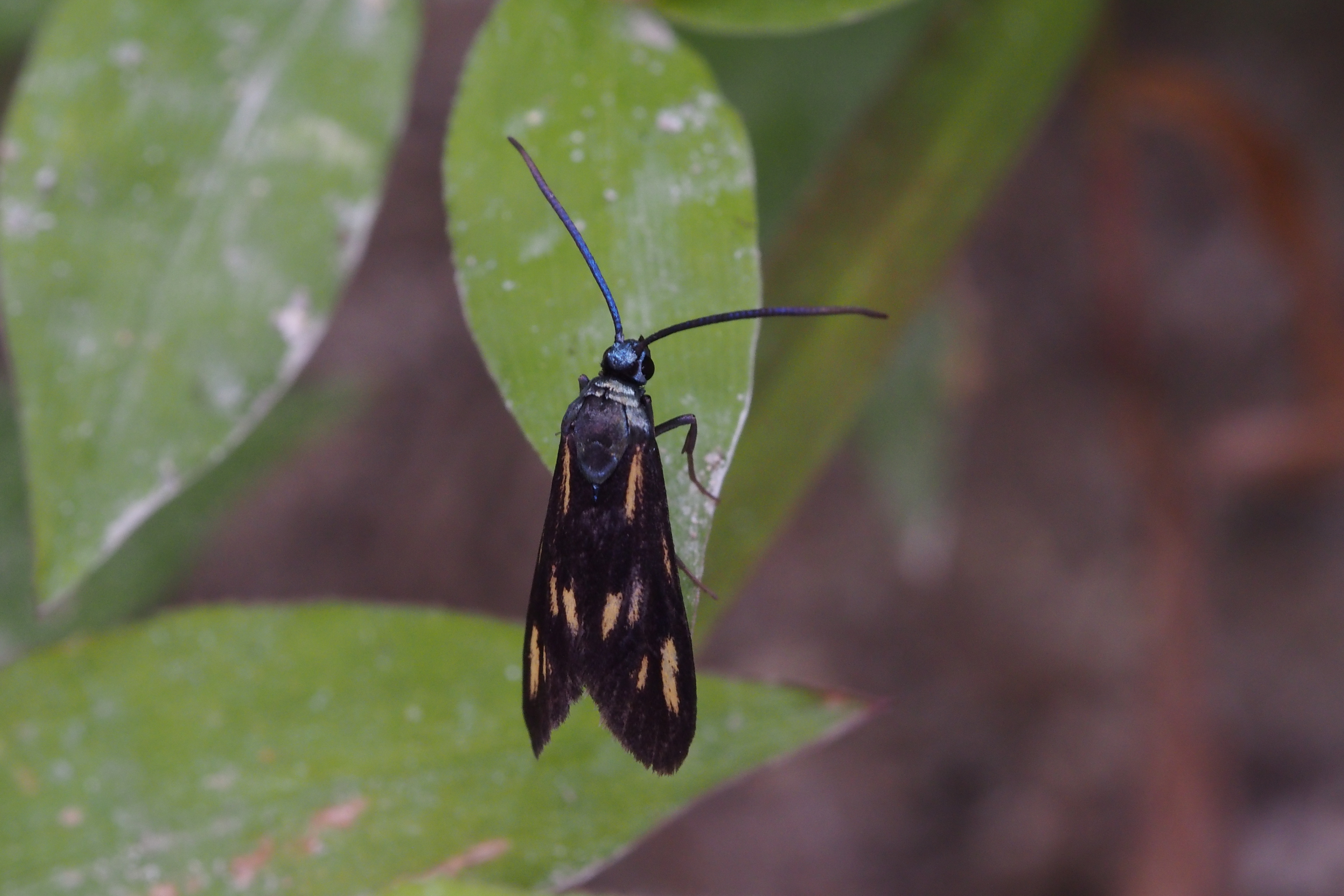
- Found in Japan

Scientific classification
- Kingdom: Animalia
- Phylum: Arthropoda
- Class: Insecta
- Order: Lepidoptera
- Family: Zygaenidae
- Genus: Balataea; Walker, 1864

= Balataea =

Genus of butterflies

Balataea is a genus of butterflies belonging to the family Zygaenidae.

The genus was first described by Walker in 1864.

The species of this genus are found in Japan.

Species:

- Balataea octomaculata Bremer, 1861
