= Procrita =

Scientific classification
- Domain: Eukaryota
- Kingdom: Animalia
- Phylum: Arthropoda
- Class: Insecta
- Order: Diptera
- Family: Lauxaniidae
- Genus: Procrita; Hendel, 1908

Genus of flies

Procrita is a genus of flies belonging to the family Lauxaniidae.

== Species ==
Species:

- Procrita pectinata Hendel, 1908
- Procrita sigma Hendel, 1910
