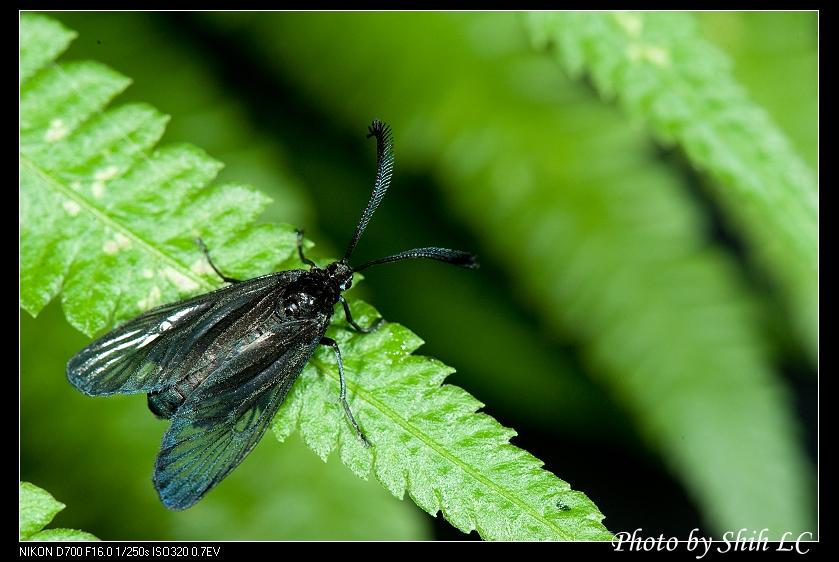
- Illiberis translucida

Scientific classification
- Kingdom: Animalia
- Phylum: Arthropoda
- Class: Insecta
- Order: Lepidoptera
- Family: Zygaenidae
- Genus: Illiberis; Walker, 1854

Synonyms
- Thyrina Poujade, 1886

= Illiberis (moth) =

Genus of moths

Illiberis is a genus of moths belonging to the family Zygaenidae.

The species of this genus are found in Southeastern Asia.

== Species ==
Species:

- Illiberis albiventris Alberti, 1954
- Illiberis aomoriensis Matsumura, 1927
- Illiberis arisana Matsumura, 1911
- Illiberis assimilis Jordan, 1907
- Illiberis consimilis Leech, 1898
- Illiberis coreana Matsumura, 1927
- Illiberis cyanecula Herrich-Schäffer, 1855
- Illiberis cyanocera Hampson, 1892
- Illiberis cybele Leech, 1888
- Illiberis diaphana Hampson, 1892
- Illiberis dirce Leech, 1888
- Illiberis distinctus Kardakoff, 1928
- Illiberis elegans Poujade, 1886
- Illiberis ellenae Alberti, 1954
- Illiberis endocyanea Hampson, 1919
- Illiberis formosensis Strand, 1915
- Illiberis fujisana Matsumura, 1927
- Illiberis fumata Alberti, 1954
- Illiberis glaucosquamata Strand, 1915
- Illiberis heringi Draeseke, 1926
- Illiberis honei Alberti, 1954
- Illiberis horishana Matsumura, 1931
- Illiberis horni Strand, 1915
- Illiberis hyalina Staudinger, 1887
- Illiberis ignea Oberthür, 1894
- Illiberis inermis Alberti, 1954
- Illiberis kardakoffi Alberti, 1951
- Illiberis kaszabi Daniel, 1970
- Illiberis laeva Püngeler, 1914
- Illiberis nigra Leech, 1888
- Illiberis nigrigemma Walker, 1854
- Illiberis ochracea Leech, 1898
- Illiberis paracybele Alberti, 1954
- Illiberis paradistincta Alberti, 1954
- Illiberis phacusana Strand, 1915
- Illiberis pruni Dyar, 1905
- Illiberis pseudopsychina Alberti, 1951
- Illiberis psychina Oberthür, 1890
- Illiberis rotundata Jordan, 1907
- Illiberis serrata Alberti, 1954
- Illiberis shensiensis Alberti, 1954
- Illiberis silvestris Strand, 1915
- Illiberis sinensis Walker, 1854
- Illiberis taikozana Matsumura, 1927
- Illiberis tenuis Butler, 1877
- Illiberis translucida Poujade, 1885
- Illiberis transvena Jordan, 1907
- Illiberis ulmivora Graeser, 1888
- Illiberis ussuriensis Alberti, 1951
- Illiberis vitrea Jordan, 1908
- Illiberis yunnanensis Alberti, 1951
