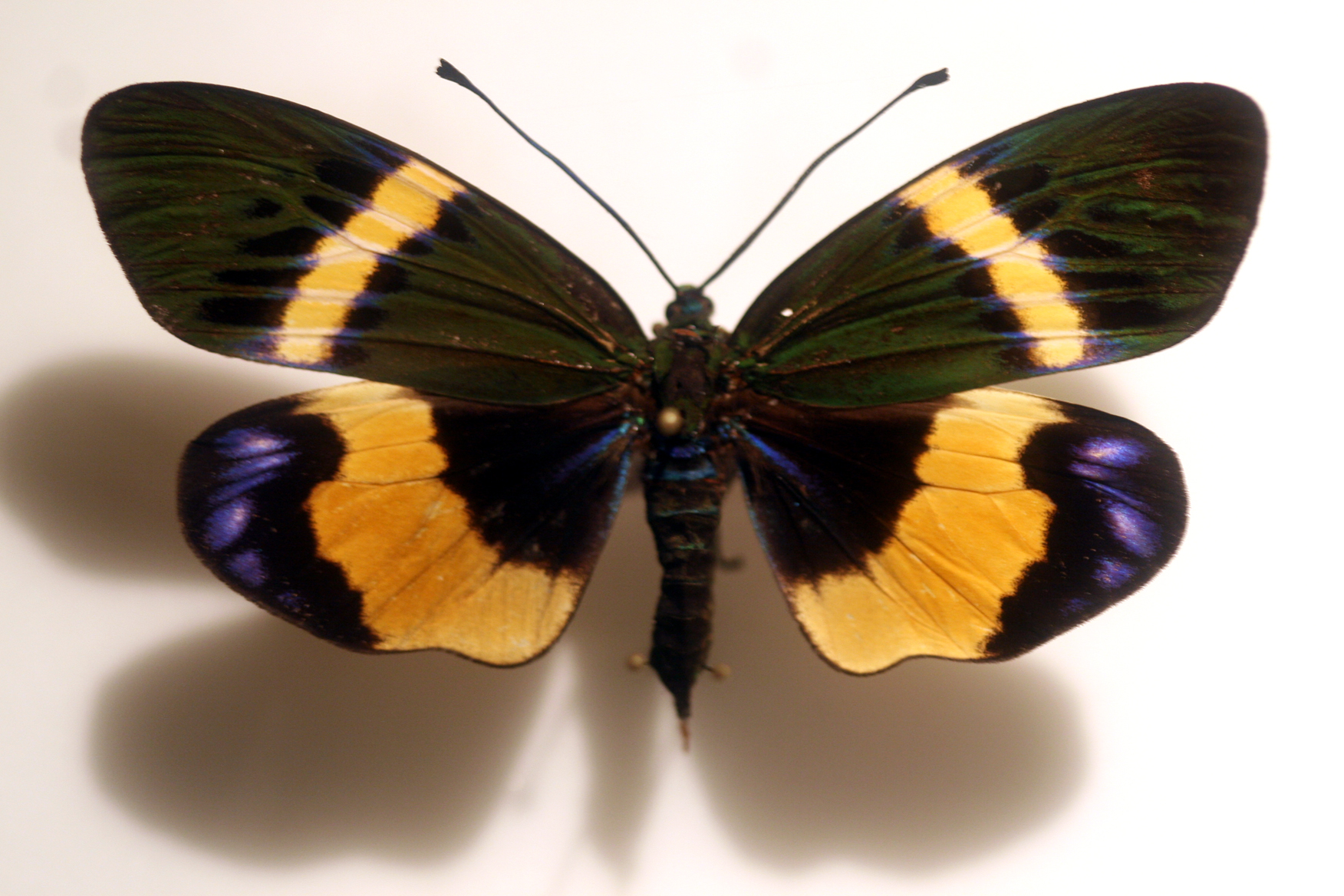
- Eterusia repleta

Scientific classification
- Kingdom: Animalia
- Phylum: Arthropoda
- Clade: Pancrustacea
- Class: Insecta
- Order: Lepidoptera
- Family: Zygaenidae
- Subfamily: Chalcosiinae

Type species
- Sphinx pectinicornis L.

Genera
- Over 65, see text

= Chalcosiinae =

Subfamily of moths

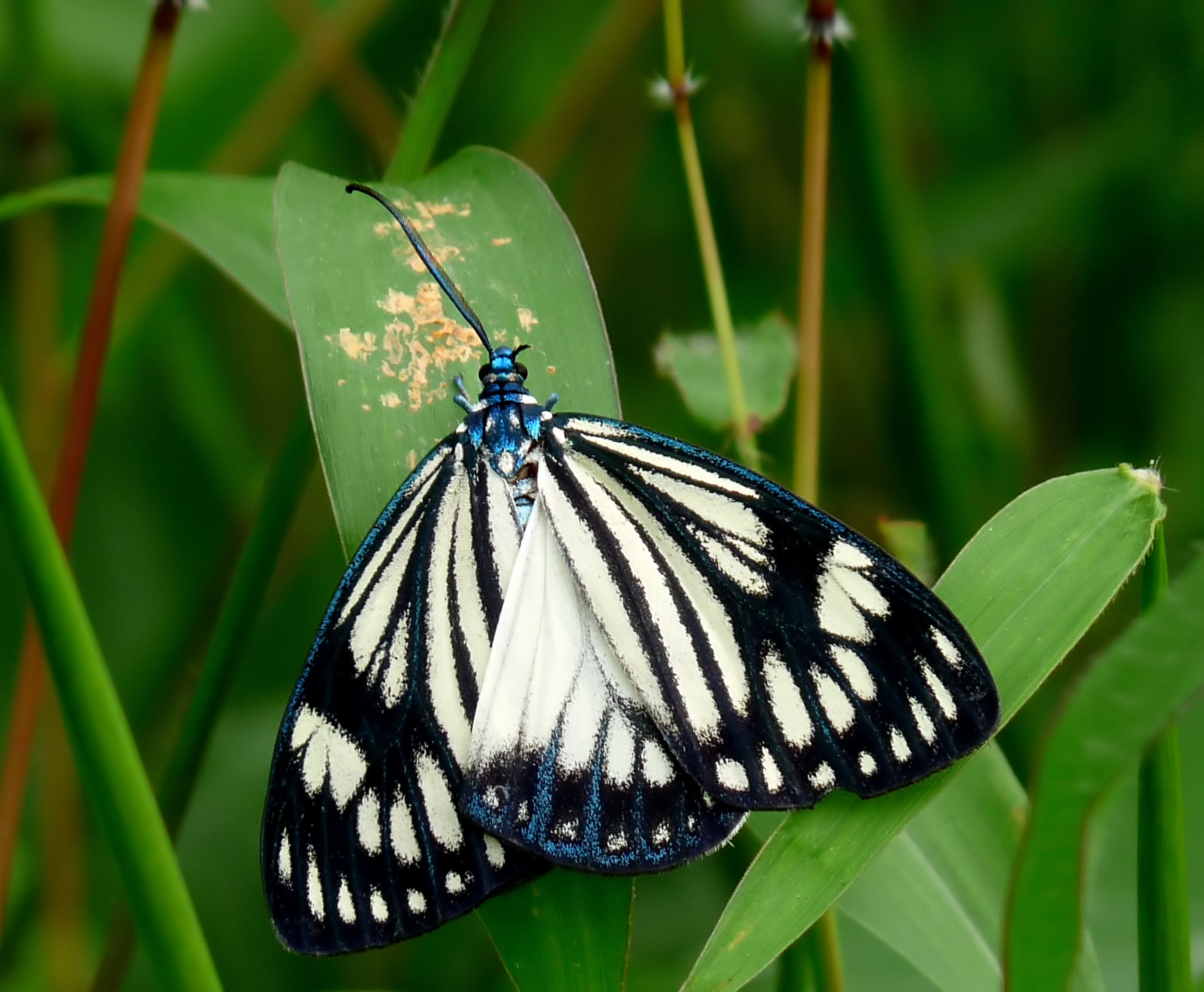
Cyclosia papilionaris, female

Chalcosiinae is a subfamily of the Zygaenidae, containing many species, mostly little known. Prominent sexual dimorphism, bright aposematic coloration and mimicry complexes are widespread.

Several members of this subfamily remain relatively obscure, only being known from a single specimen, as in the case of the genus Isocrambia. Some others are known from specimens of a specific sex, such as Cyanidia and Allocaprima.

== Distribution ==
The members of Chalcosiinae are distributed throughout Palearctic East Asia, Southeast Asia, Melanesia, and Micronesia. The majority of the subfamily extending as far north as the Russian Far-East (Elcysma westwoodi) and as far west as Pakistan (Campylotes). A single genus, Aglaope is disjunctly distributed from the remainder of the subfamily, being found in the Iberian Peninsula and southern France.

== Mimicry ==
A large majority of Chalcosiine moths engage in mimicry complexes with a large variety of butterflies and moths. Yen Shen-Horn designates 19 unique types, separated by wing patterns which allow the ability to mimic a large variety of lepidopterans.

Species that are mimicked by Chalcosiine moths include:

Laelia, Pantana, Calinaga, Parantica, Aporia, Idea, Ideopsis, Euploea, Danaus, Delias, Eurema, Milionia, Scrobigera, Nyctemera, Dysphania, Lithosiinae, Sesiidae, Syntomini, Asota, Damias, Retina, Troidini, Melanothrix

== Systematics ==
Alberti (1954) created five tribes within the subfamily. The five tribes only covered 40 genera, with the remaining 25 genera at the time lacking the proper material to warrant division. With this subfamily's notorious obscurity, and the relative variation between species and subspecies, the relationships between members is still quite indeterminate. S.H. Yen and team (2005) proposes 18 clades, with the Heteropanini being elevated to subfamily level. Clade 1 encompassing Agalopini and Aglaopini, Clade 2 encompassing an extended Cyclosiini, and Chalcosiini being the remainder of clades 6-18. As they describe, the nomenclature for this subfamily is currently unstable and is subject to further revision.

The subfamily consists of about 380 species in 70 genera. It contains the following genera

=== Aglaopini ===
- Aglaope

=== Agalopini ===
- Agalope
- Boradia
- Campylotes
- Chalcophaedra
- Corma
- Elcysma
- Herpa
- Philopator
- Rhodopsona

=== Cyclosiini ===
- Cadphises
- Cyclosia
- Hampsonia

=== Chalcosiini ===
- Amesia
- Anarbudas
- Aphantocephala
- Caprima
- Chalcosia
- Docleopsis
- Erasmia
- Erasmiphlebohecta
- Eterusia
- Eusphalera
- Gynautocera
- Histia
- Milleria
- Pidorus
- Pompelon
- Prosopandrophila
- Psaphis
- Pseudarbudas
- Pseudonyctemera
- Pseudoscaptesyle
- Retina
- Soritia
- Trypanophora

=== Heteropanini ===
- Arbudas
- Chalcosiopsis
- Eumorphiopais
- Heteropan

=== Incertae sedis ===
- Achelura
- Allocyclosia
- Atelesia
- Barbaroscia
- Boradiopsis
- Canerkes
- Clematoessa
- Cleoda
- Codane
- Cryptophysophilus
- Cyanidia
- Devanica
- Didina
- Docleomorpha
- Epyrgis
- Eucorma
- Eucormopsis
- Euxanthopyge
- Hadrionella
- Hemiscia
- Hemichrysoptera
- Herpidia
- Herpolasia
- Heteropanula
- Heterusinula
- Isbarta
- Isocrambia
- Laurion
- Mimascaptesyle
- Mimeuploea
- Neochalcosia
- Neoherpa
- Opisoplatia
- Panherpina
- Phlebohecta
- Pintia
- Sciodoclea
- Scotopais
- Thaumastophleps
- Watermenia

== Gallery ==
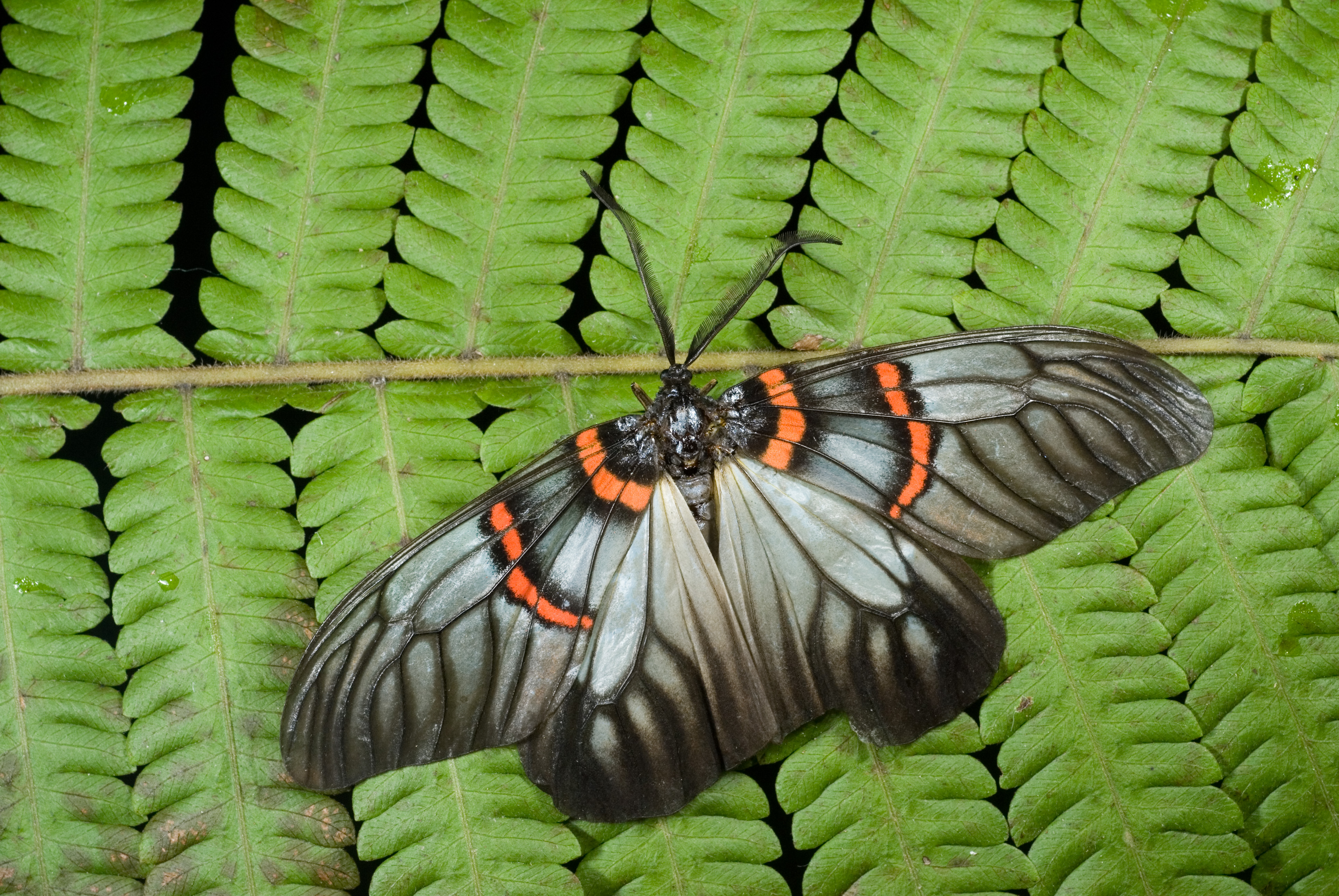
Achelura sanguifasciata

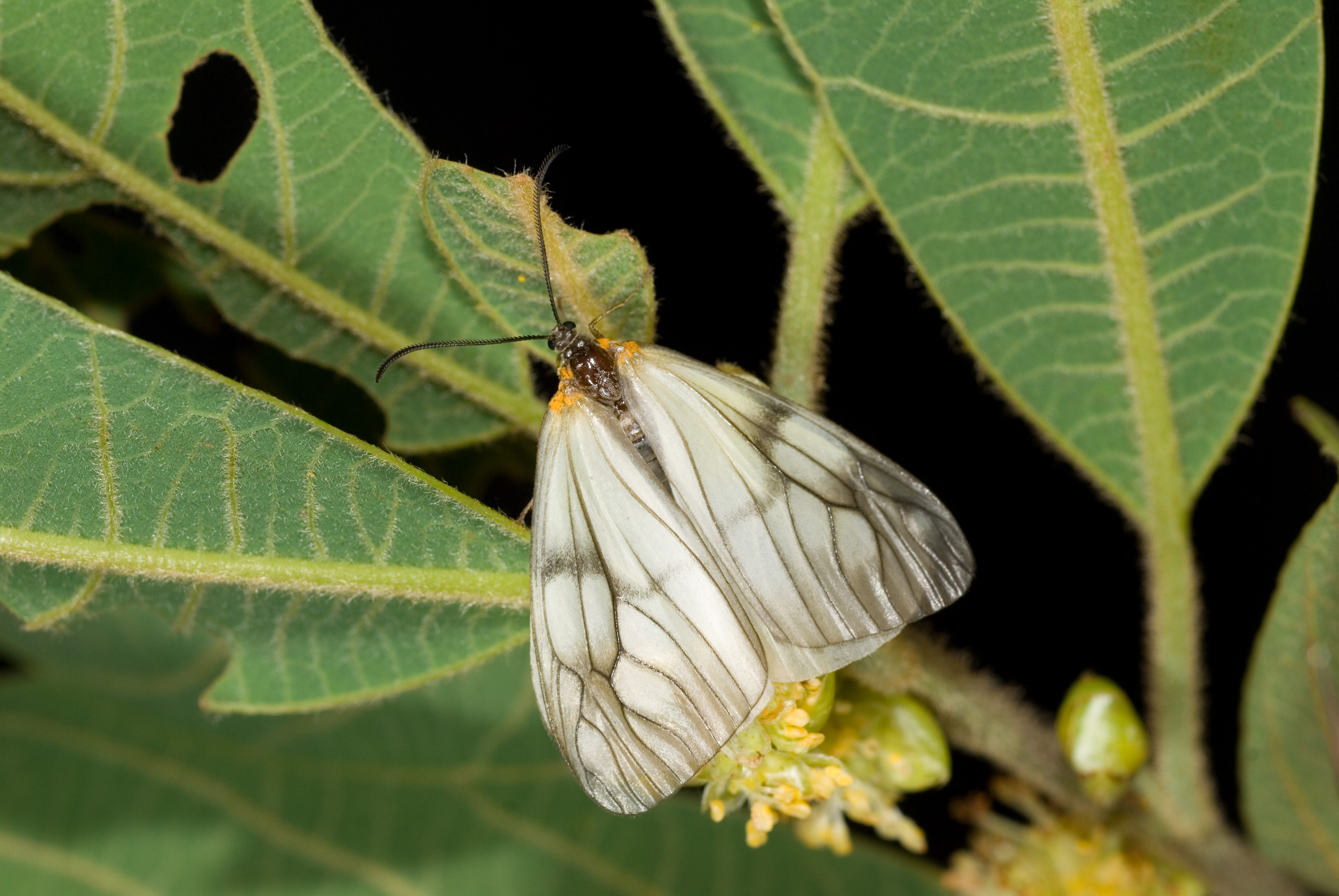
Agalope formosana

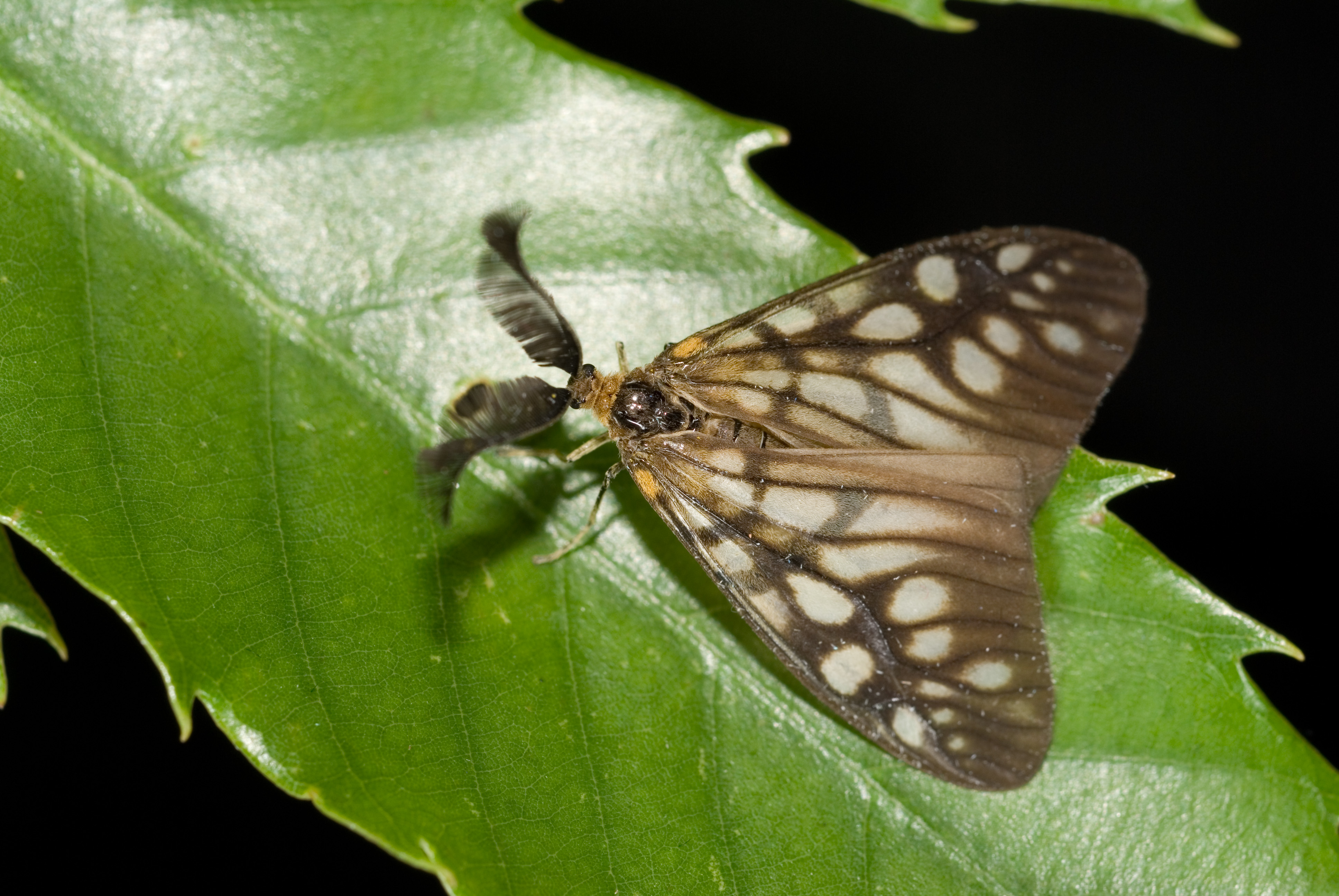
Agalope wangi

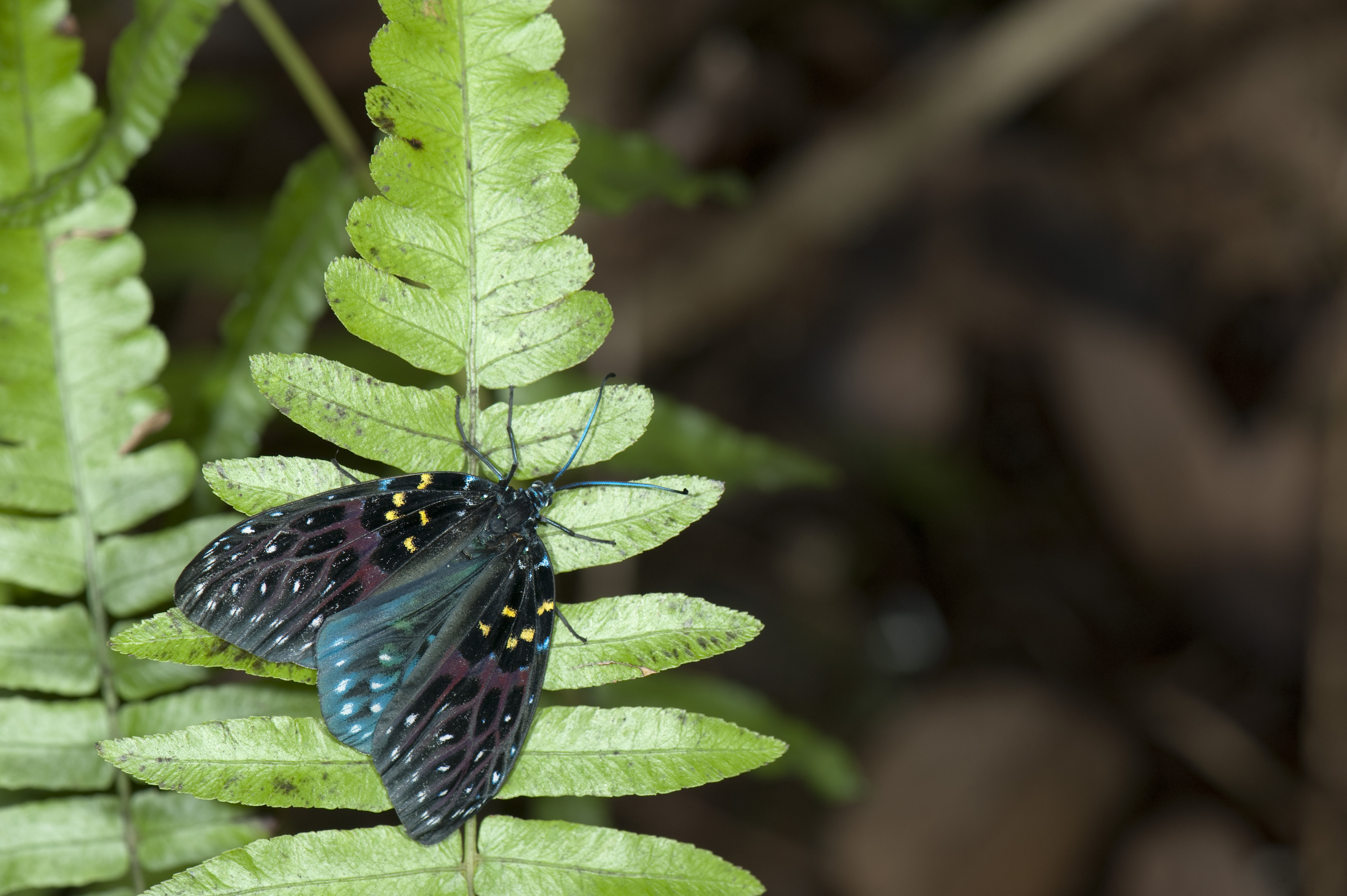
Amesia sanguiflua

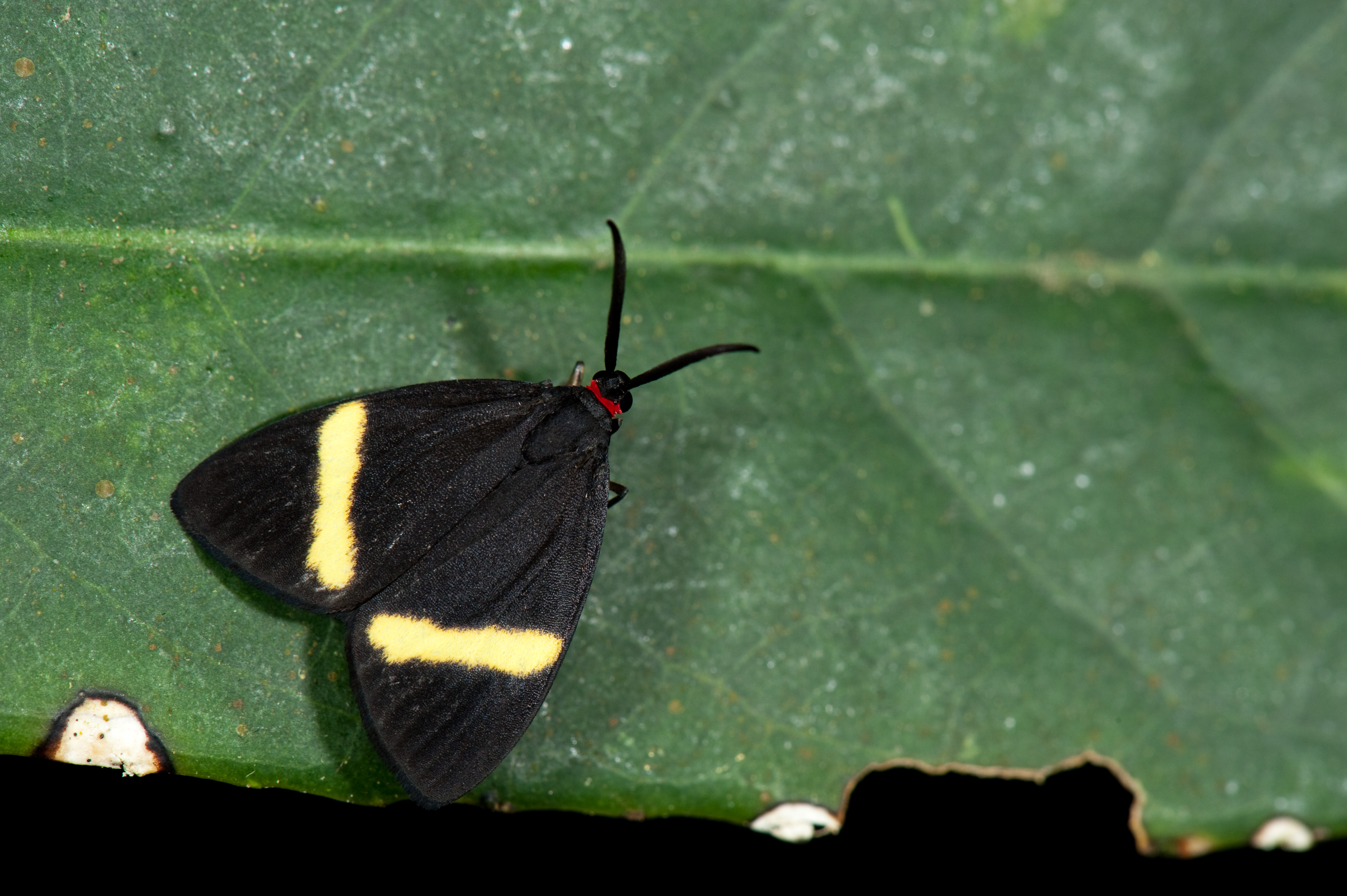
Arbudas leno

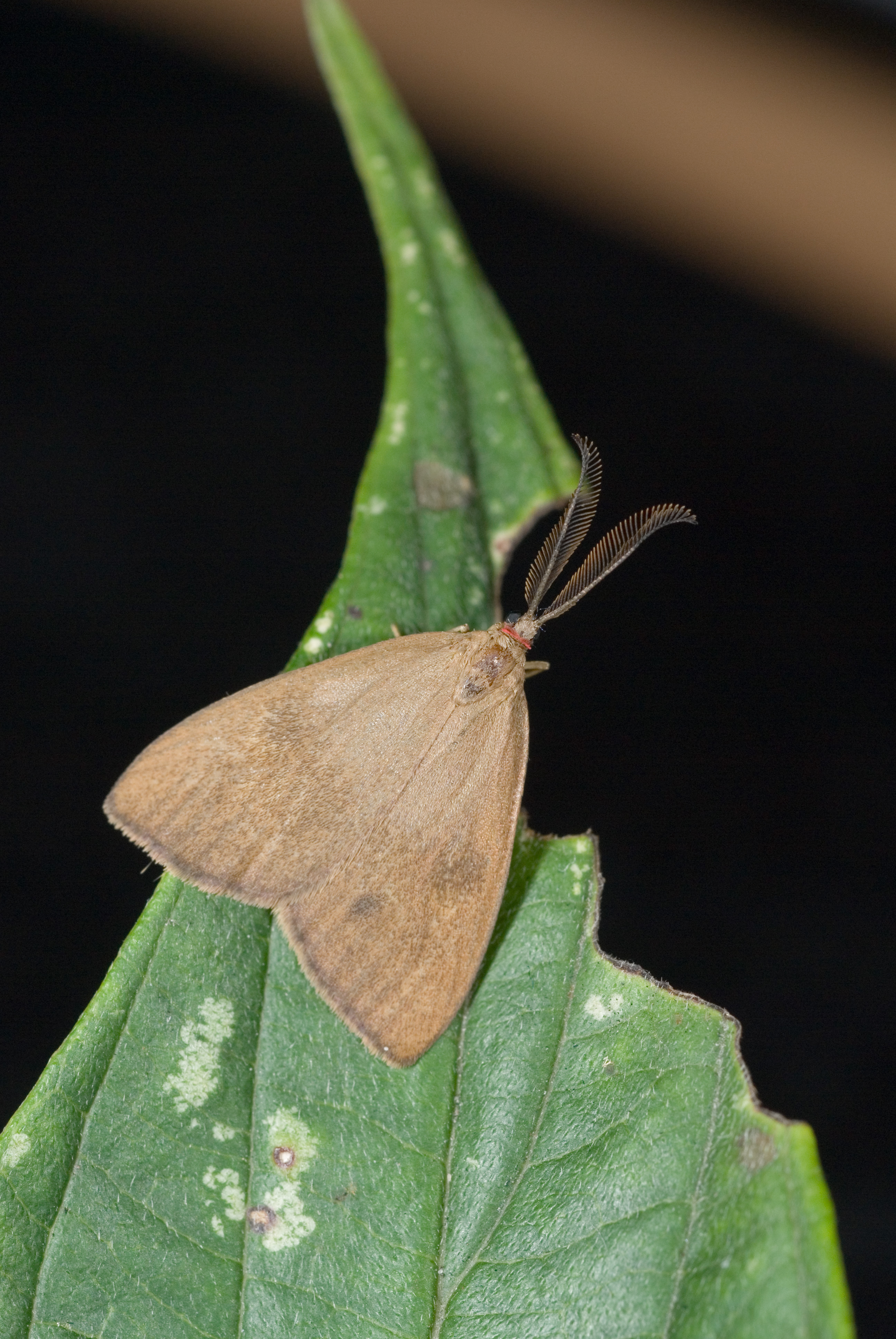
Arbudas submacula

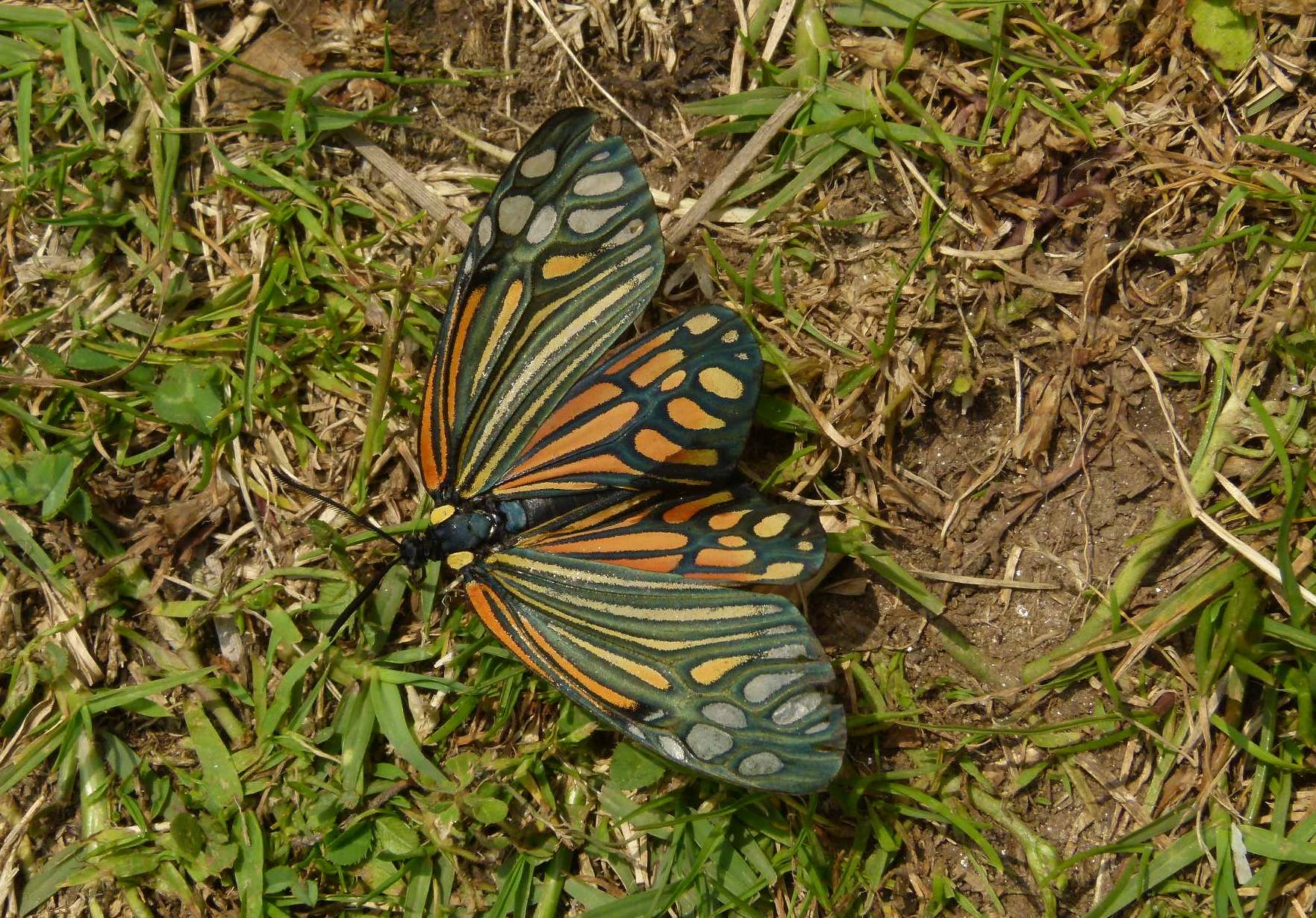
Campylotes histrionicus

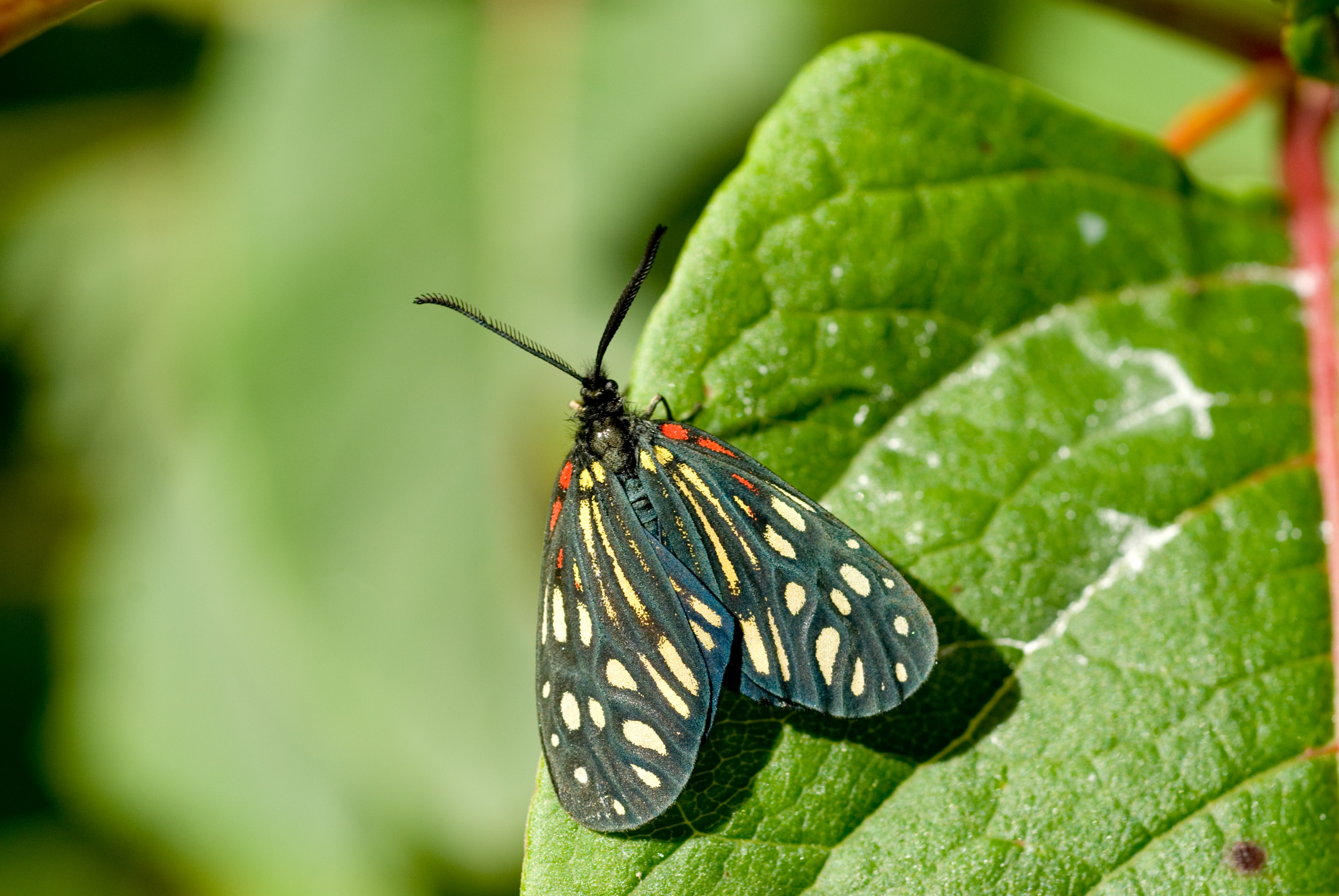
Campylotes maculosa

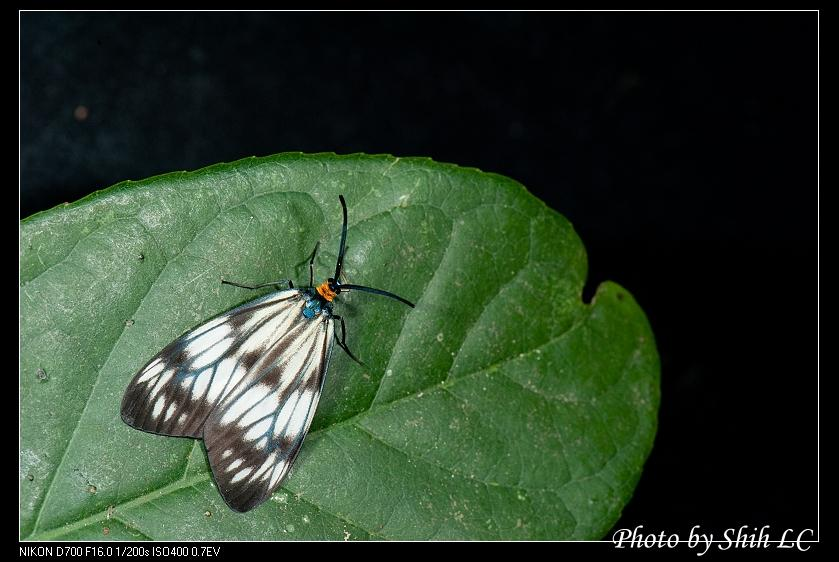
Chalcosia formosana

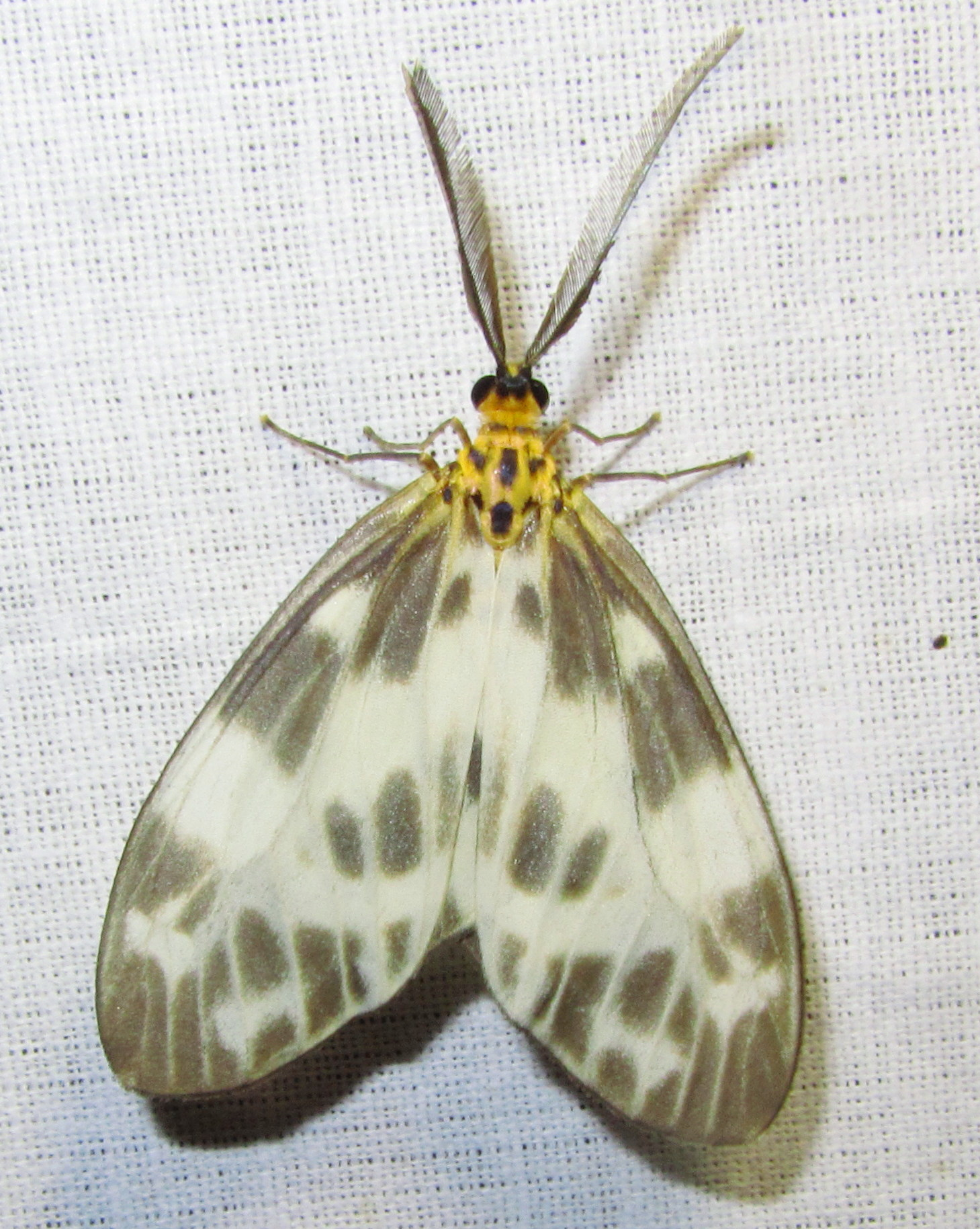
Corma maculata

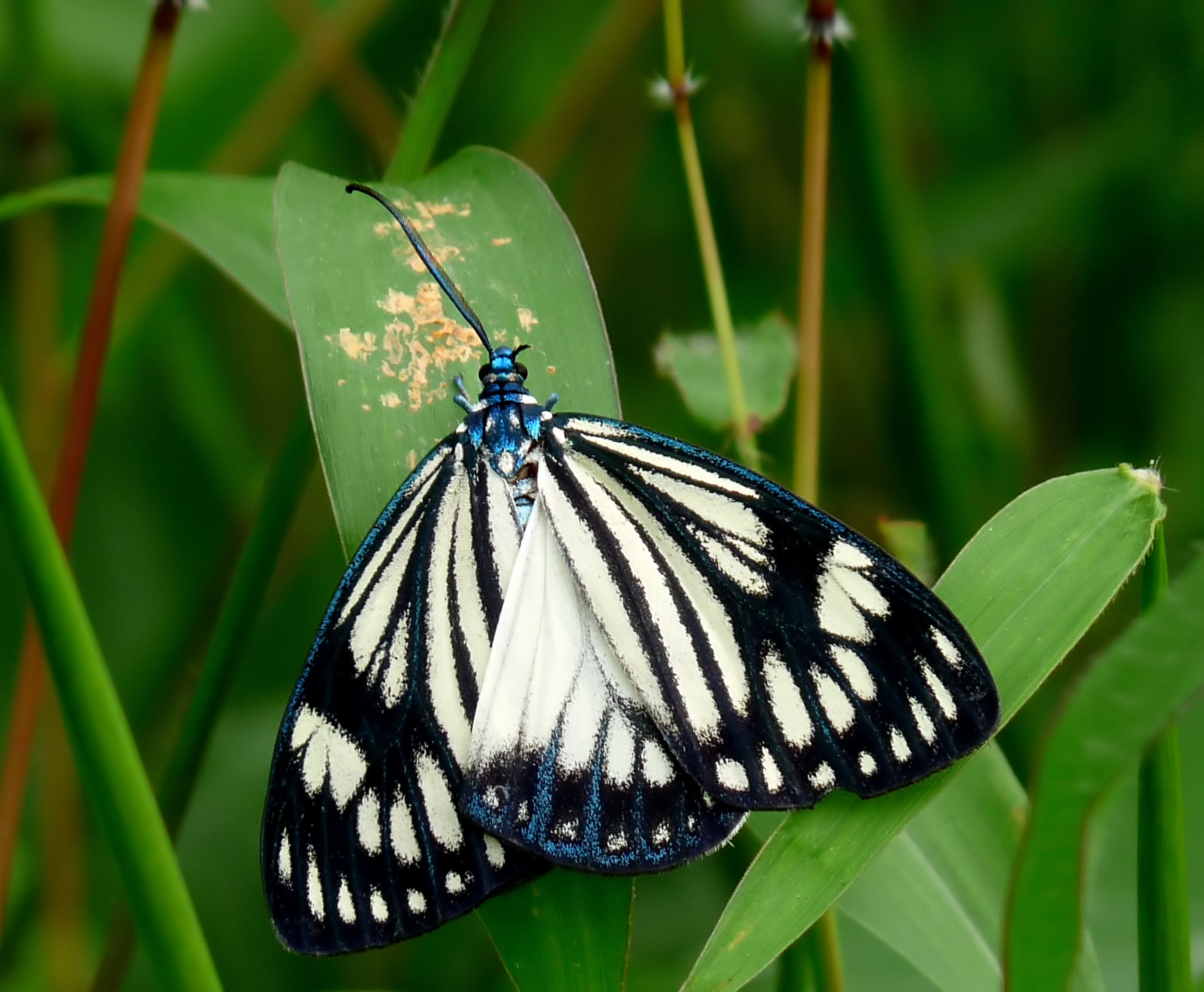
Cyclosia papilionaris

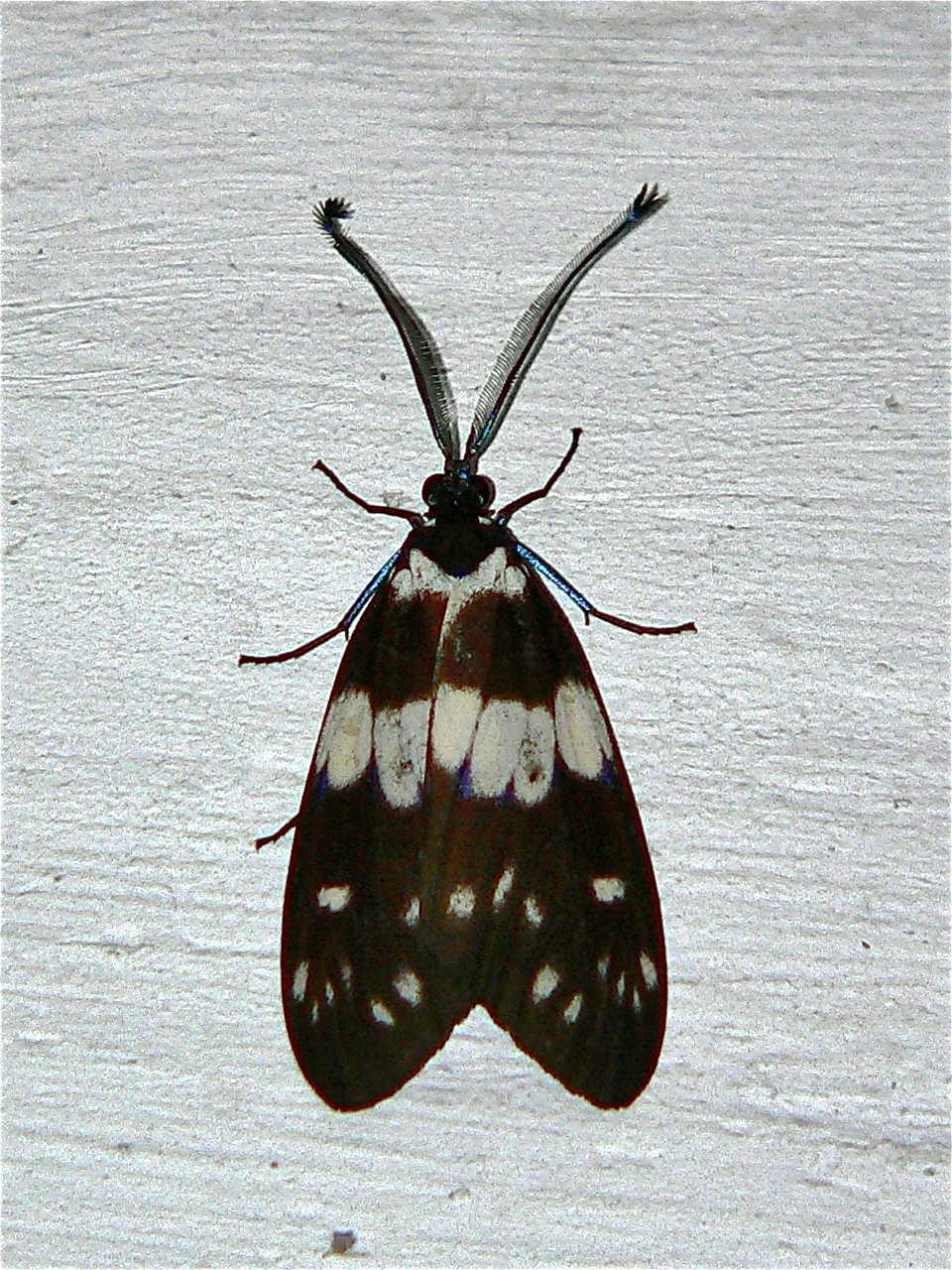
Eterusia aedea

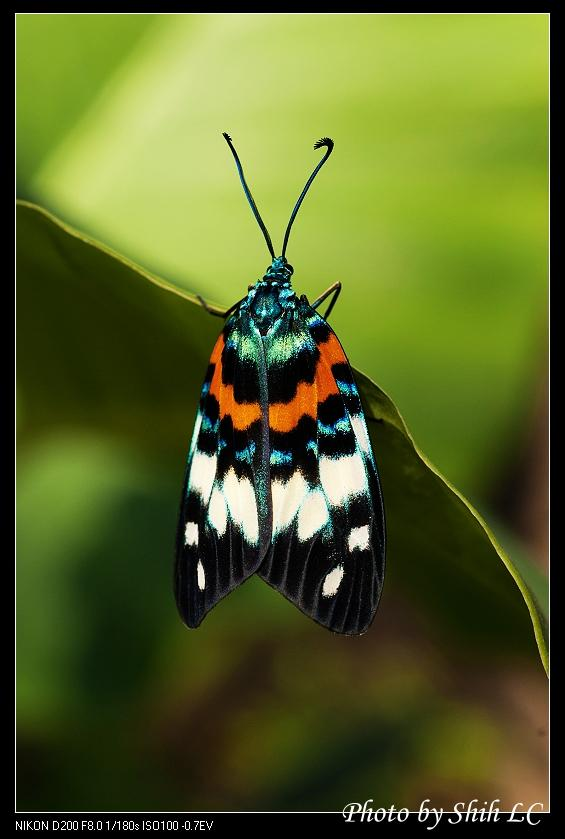
Erasmia pulchella

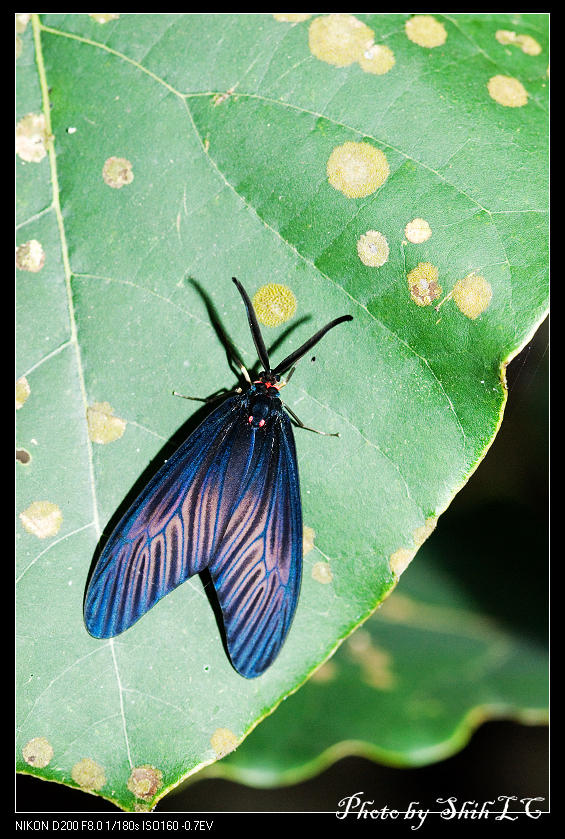
Gynautocera rubriscutellata

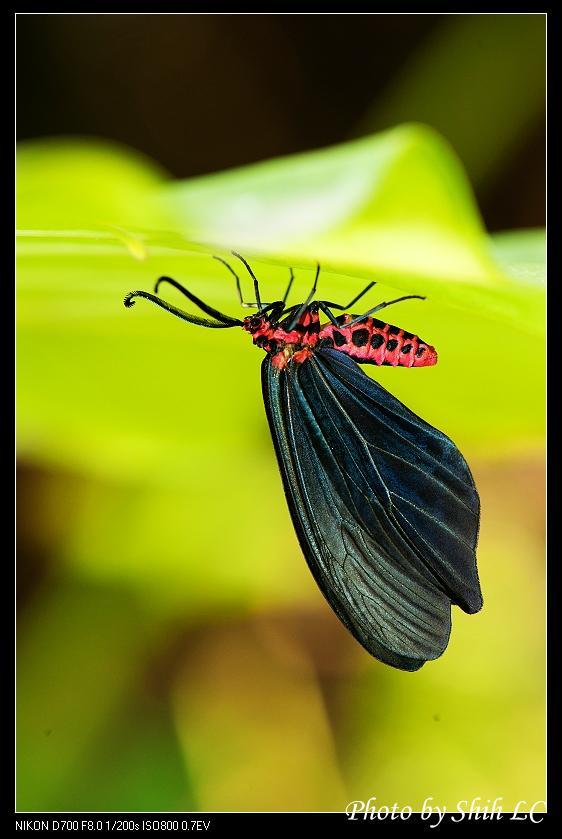
Histia flabellicornis

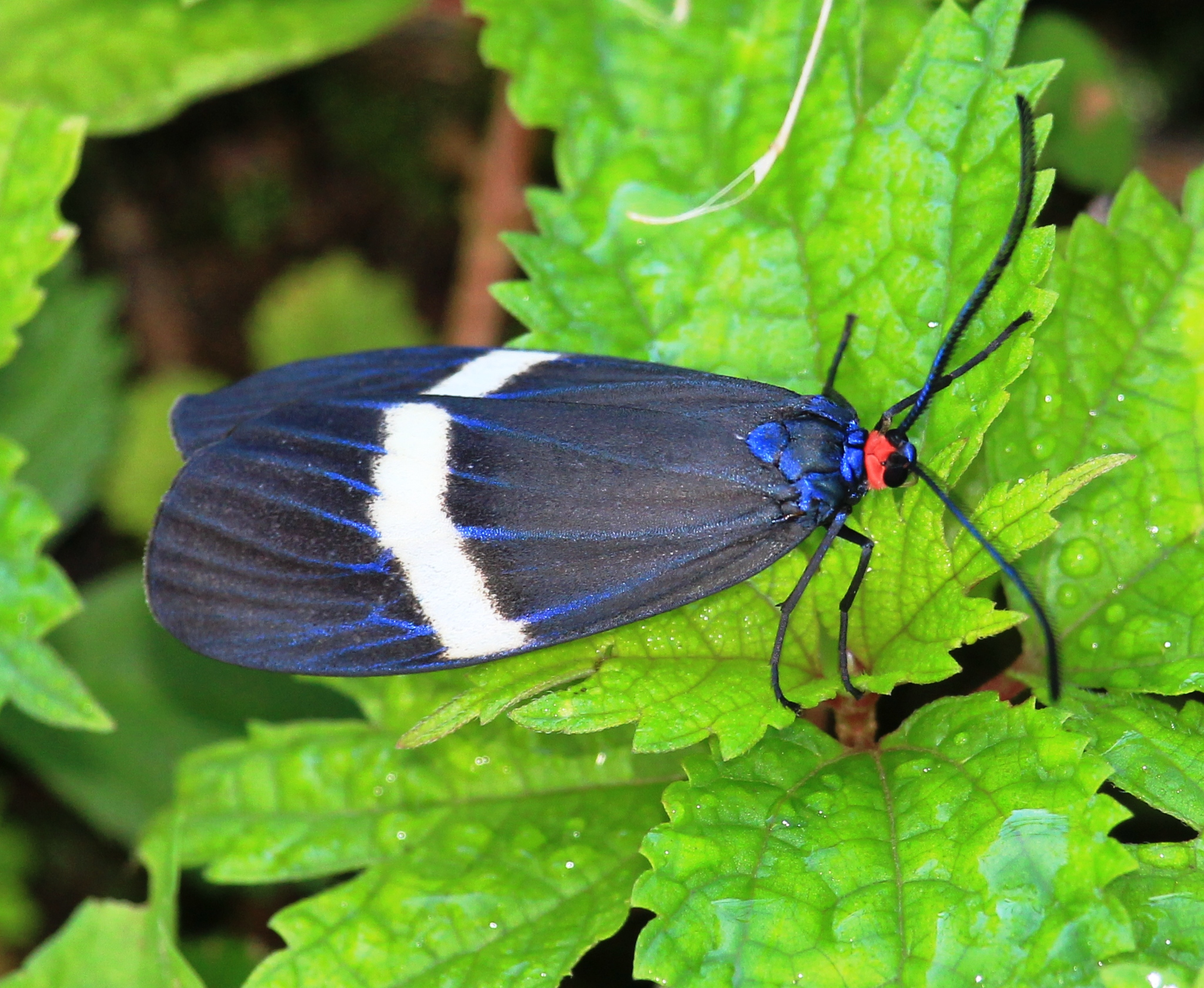
Neochalcosia remota

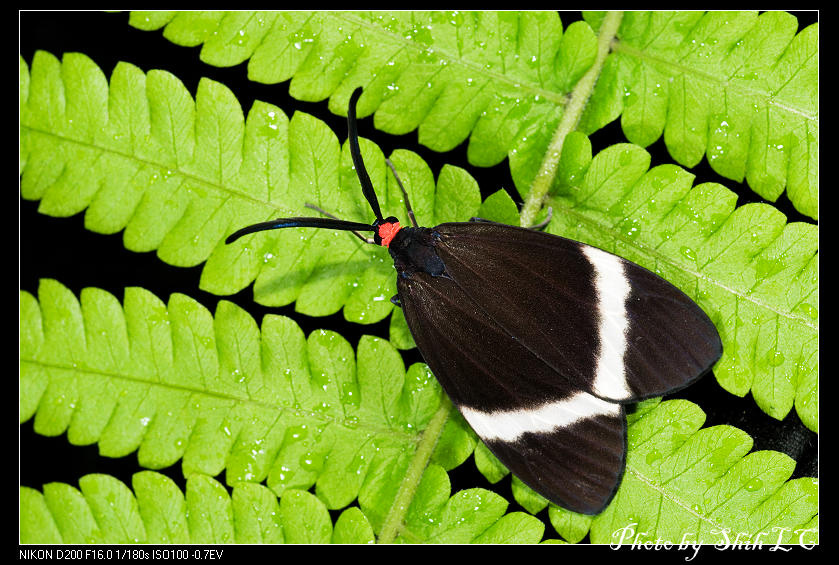
Pidorus atratus

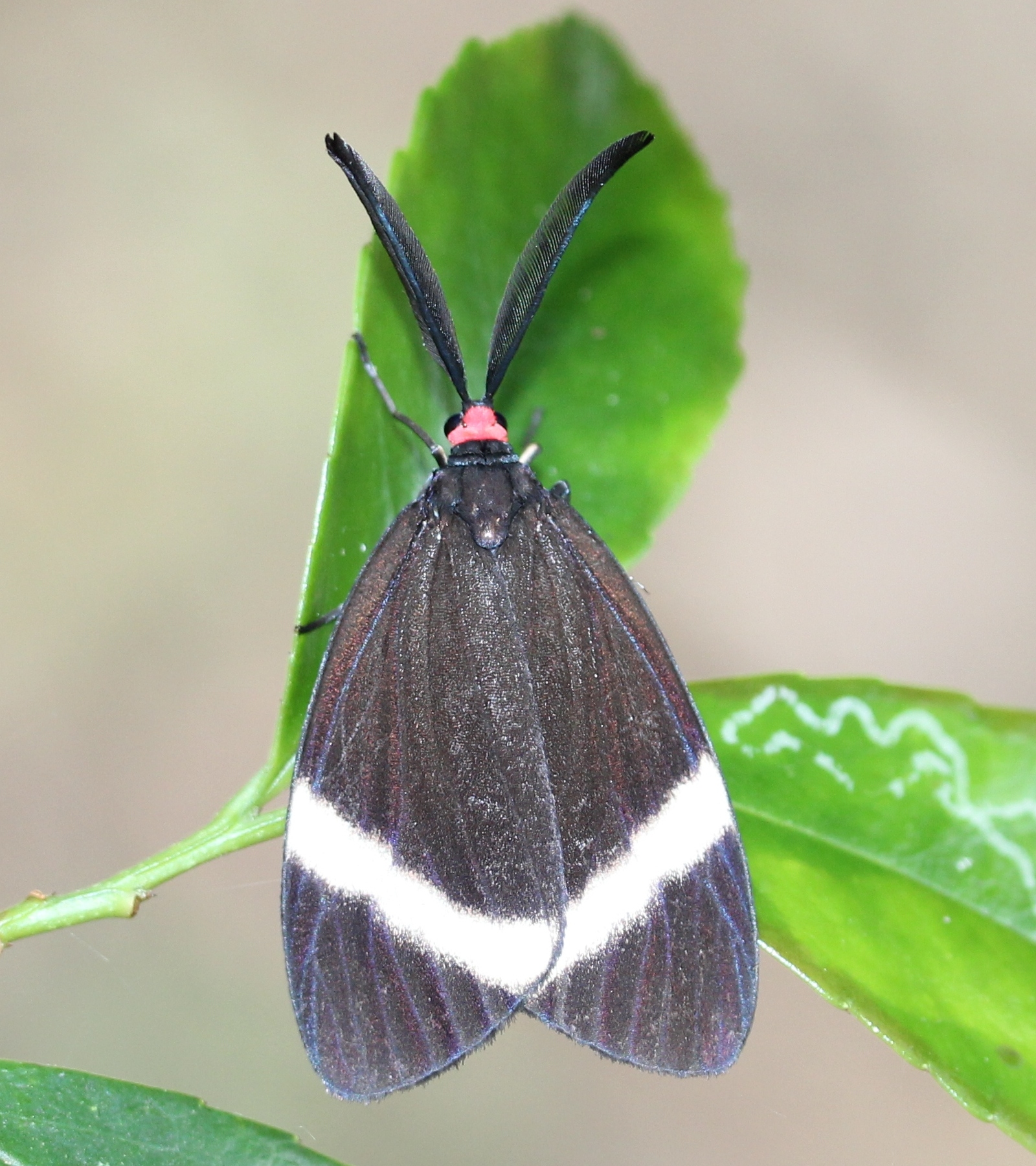
Pidorus glaucopis

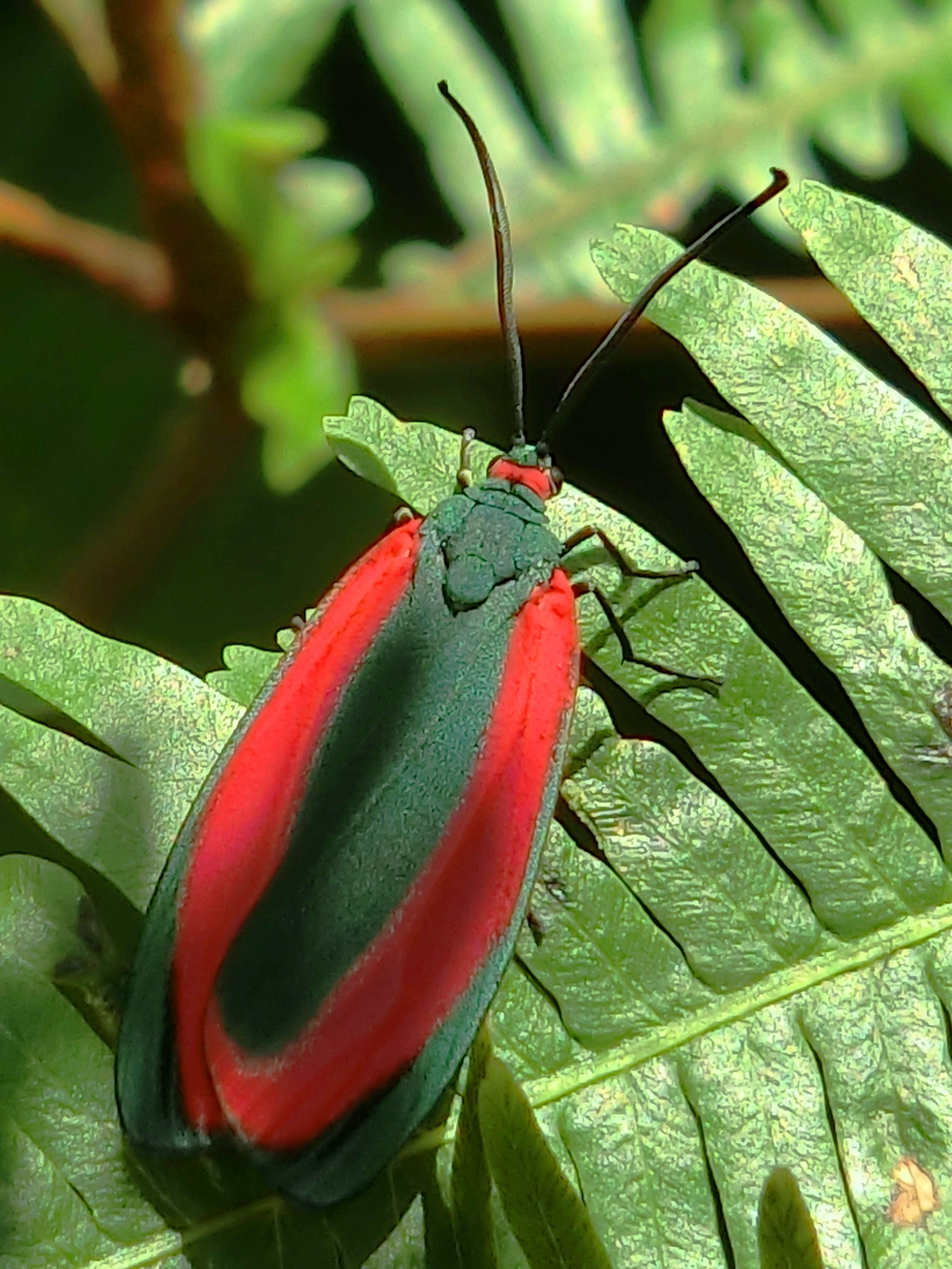
Retina rubrivitta

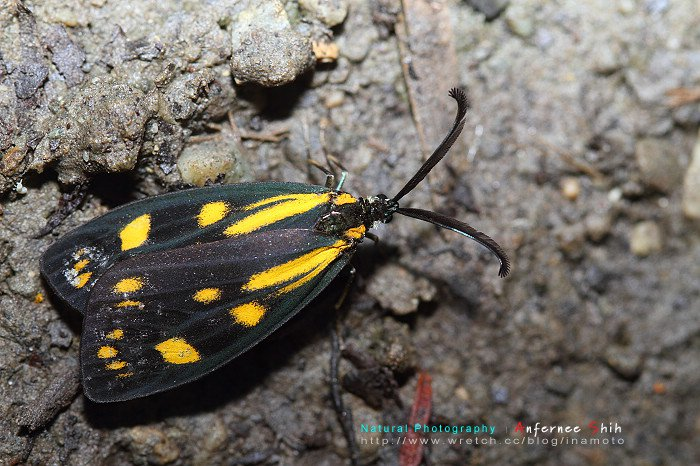
Soritia strandi
