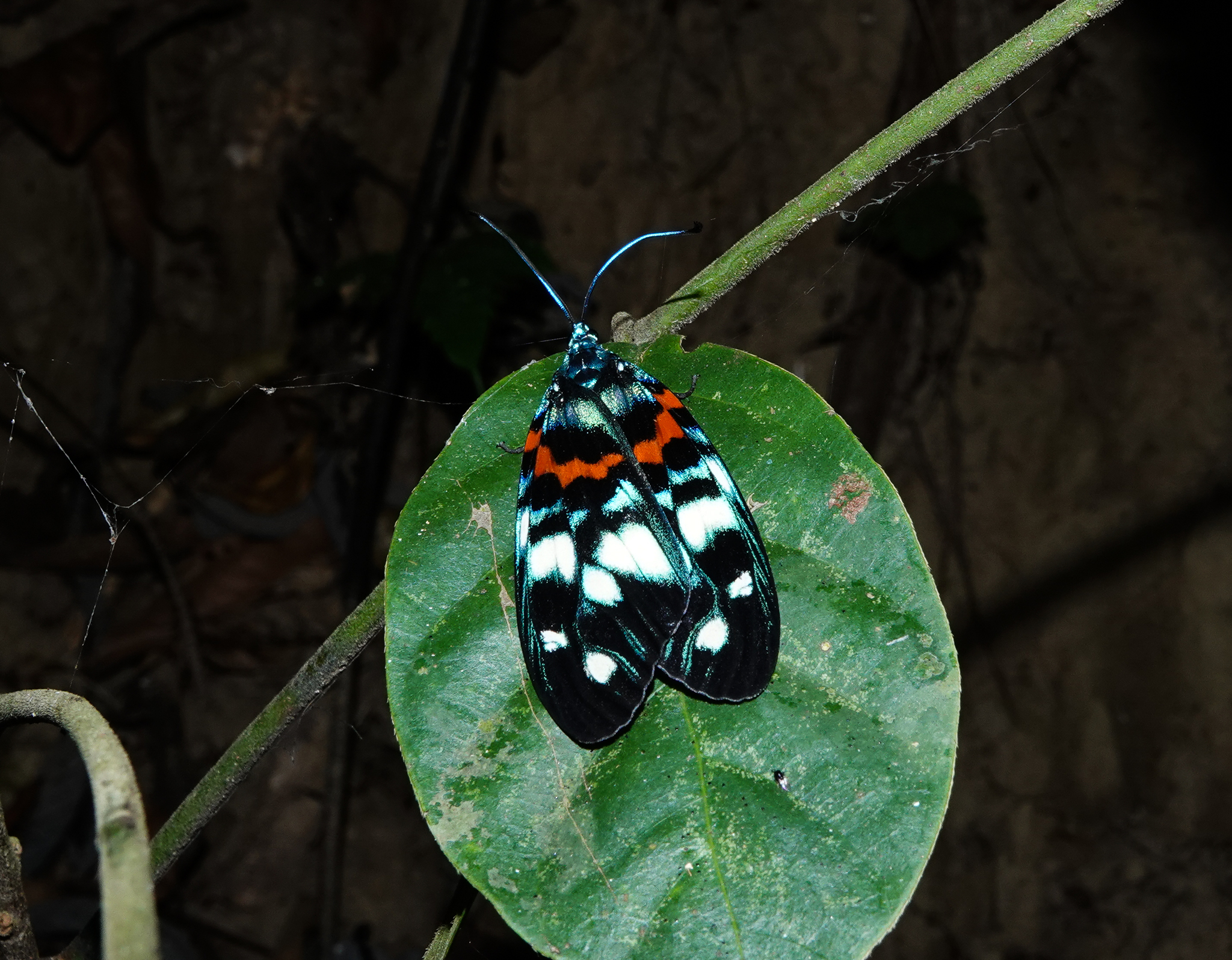

Scientific classification
- Kingdom: Animalia
- Phylum: Arthropoda
- Clade: Pancrustacea
- Class: Insecta
- Order: Lepidoptera
- Family: Zygaenidae
- Genus: Erasmia
- Species: E. pulchella

Binomial name
- Erasmia pulchella Hope, 1840

Synonyms
- Erasmia chinensis Hering, 1922; Erasmia conjuncta Strand, 1916; Erasmia cyanea Jordan, 1907; Erasmia hainana Jordan, 1909

= Erasmia pulchella =

Species of moth

Erasmia pulchella is a species of moth in the burnet moth family Zygaenidae and in the subfamily Chalcosiinae. It was described by Frederick William Hope in 1840. It is found throughout Southeast Asia, with its range stretching from northern India, Myanmar, Laos, Thailand, Vietnam, China, Taiwan, and Japan. It is the type species of the genus Erasmia.

The moth's larvae feed on Helicia cochinchinensis, and they build up toxic cyanide compounds within its body. As a deterrent, the moths are brightly colored to serve as aposematic coloration. Additionally, under threat, the adult moths can exude toxins in the form of a foam that is typically exuded from the neck. The chemical compounds linamarin and lotaustralin have been isolated from the moth as specific noxious chemicals. Various subspecies exude the toxins through various locations. There are six known subspecies of Erasmia pulchella.

The moth is known as サツマニシキ, Satsuma-nishiki in Japanese, the name refers to the resemblance of the moth's wings to nishiki cloth, a type of dyed silk cloth with interwoven gold thread. The Chinese name for the moth is 山龍眼螢斑蛾, Shān lóngyǎn yíng bān é, "Mountain longan moth" and 雙星錦斑蛾, Shuāngxīng jǐn bān é, "Double star firefly moth". The former refers to its diet of Helicia cochinchinensis and the latter refers to its wing patterns.

== Description ==
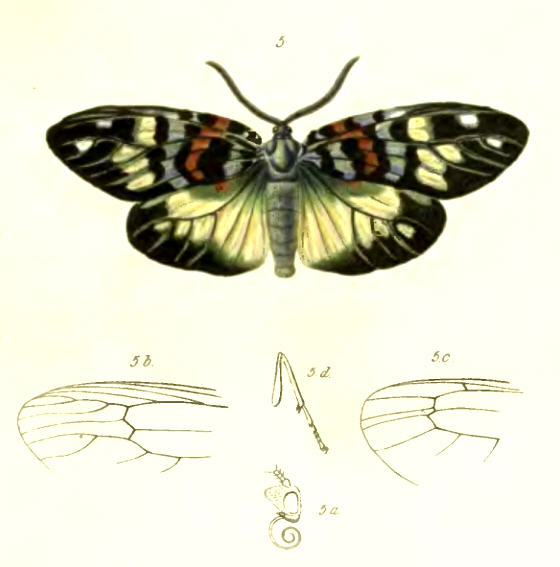
An illustration of E. pulchella in Transactions of the Linnean Society of London by William Griffith

Erasmia pulchella belongs to the burnet moth family Zygaenidae. A moderately large moth, with a wingspan of 70–80 millimetres (2.8–3.1 in), its wings are covered in brightly colored and iridescent patterns that serve as aposematic deterrence. Turquoise in color and mottled with black and white patterns, a reddish orange band bisects the forewing pattern. The hindwing patterns differs on the subspecies, as the moth is spread over a broad geographic range and is highly variable throughout its range, with mainland Japanese subspecies being the darkest colored, and the Okinawa subspecies having a brighter blue color. The outer edge of both the forewings and hindwings are black in color. Of the Chalcosiine moths, a study by Yen Shen-Horn et al. postulates that E. pulchella demonstrates the "greatest degree of wing maculation and zonation" of all its relatives. One individual remarked that E. pulchella was "one of the most beautiful moth species", "the most beautiful moth in Japan", and another noting it as the "most beautiful moth of Southern Japan". Hope described the moth as "certainly some of the most beautiful of the Lepidoptera", and "one of the most lovely in colouring of all the Lepidoptera". Because of the striking colors of the wings, they are often harvested for the purpose of jewellery, both historically and in the modern day.

This aposematic coloration is due to the toxic nature of the moth, as its body contains hydrogen cyanide throughout all life stages. Additionally, as an extra form of deterrence, adult moths can deter predators by exuding a noxious chemical from their heads in the form of a foam.

The moths are diurnal, and visit flowers during the day. Adult moths use their proboscis to drink flower nectar. At rest, the moth's hindwings are covered by their forewings, which rest overtop the hindwings when closed.

== Taxonomy ==
Erasmia pulchella was described by Frederick William Hope in 1841 in Transactions of the Linnean Society of London. The type specimen was obtained in Assam, India. It is the type species for the genus Erasmia. The genus Erasmia formerly encompassed members of the now-separate genus of moth Amesia, which was listed as Erasmia sangiflua historically. Amesia formerly occupied a position within Erasmia at the subgenus level, but was raised to the level of genus later on.

Within Chalcosiinae it is part of the tribe Chalcosiini. A comprehensive study of the subfamily Chalcosiinae by Shen-Horn Yen et al. placed E. pulchella as a part of clade 11, of which will be illustrated below:

- - - Clade 11
      - - - - Amesia sanguiflua
            - Amesia aliris
          - Amesia apoensis
        - - Erasmiphlebohecta picturata
          - Chalcophaedra zuleika
        - Erasmia pulchella
        - Eucorma obliquaria
        - Eucorma intercisa
        - Eucorma euphaena
      - - - - - Pidorus circe
              - Pidorus ochrolophus
            - Pseudoscaptesyle circumdata
          - - Pidorus fasciatus
            - Soritia bicolor
        - Barbaroscia amabilis

Their findings support a close relationship between Erasmia and Barbaroscia, Pseudoscaptesyle, Amesia, Eucorma, Erasmiphlebohecta, and Chalcophaedra.

Erasmia pulchella hobsoni was described as the separate species Erasmia hobsoni before being subsumed into E. pulchella at the subspecies level. The epithet refers to Mr. H.E. Hobson, who collected the specimen for Butler's description.

It is divided into seven subspecies.

- Erasmia pulchella subsp. chinensis Jordan, 1907
- Erasmia pulchella subsp. fritzei Jordan, 1907
- Erasmia pulchella subsp. hobsoni Butler, 1889
- Erasmia pulchella subsp. kumageana Inoue, 1975
- Erasmia pulchella subsp. nipponica Inoue, 1976
- Erasmia pulchella subsp. pulchella
- Erasmia pulchella subsp. sakishimana Inoue, 1976

== Life history ==
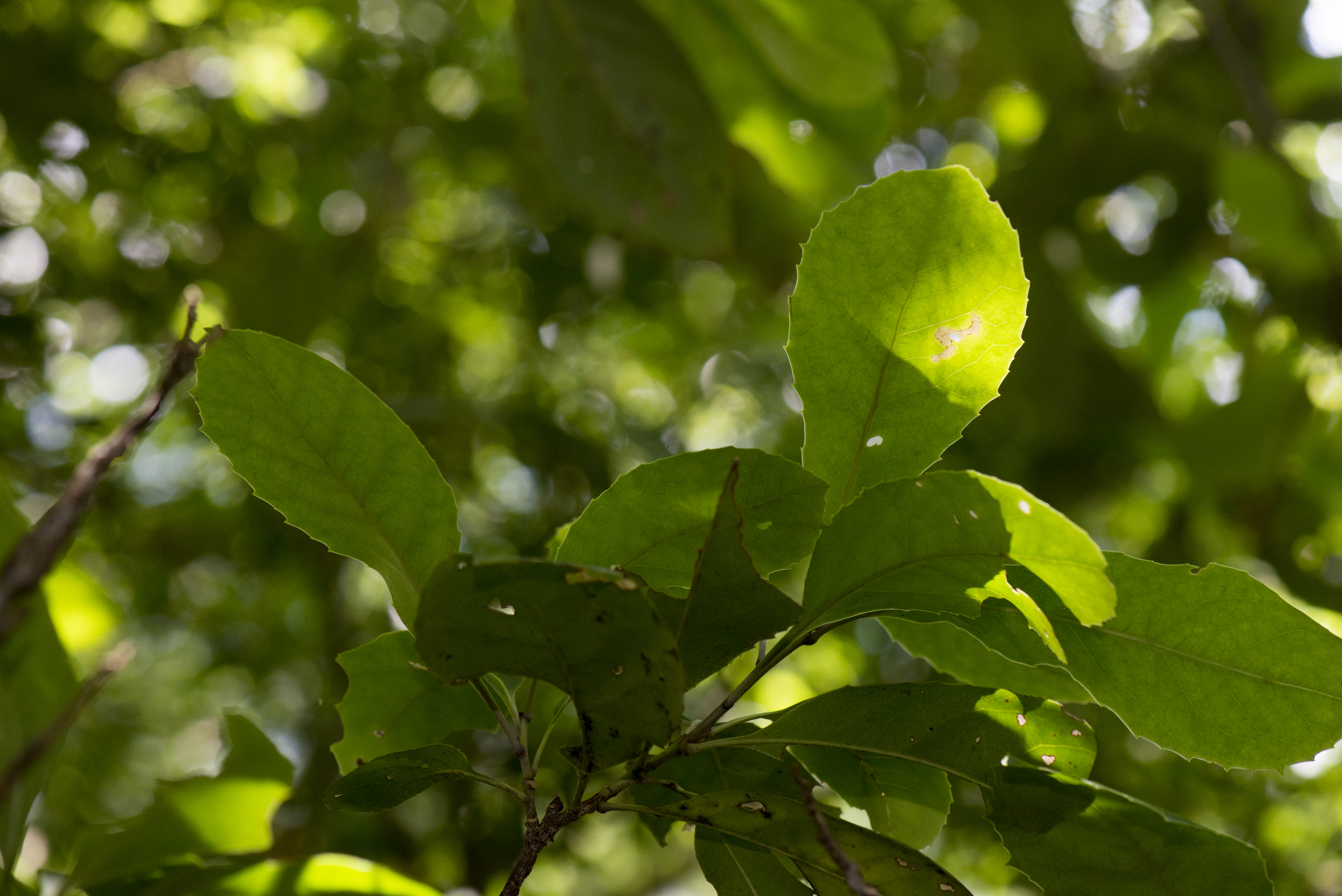
Larvae prefer the leaves of Helicia cochinchinensis

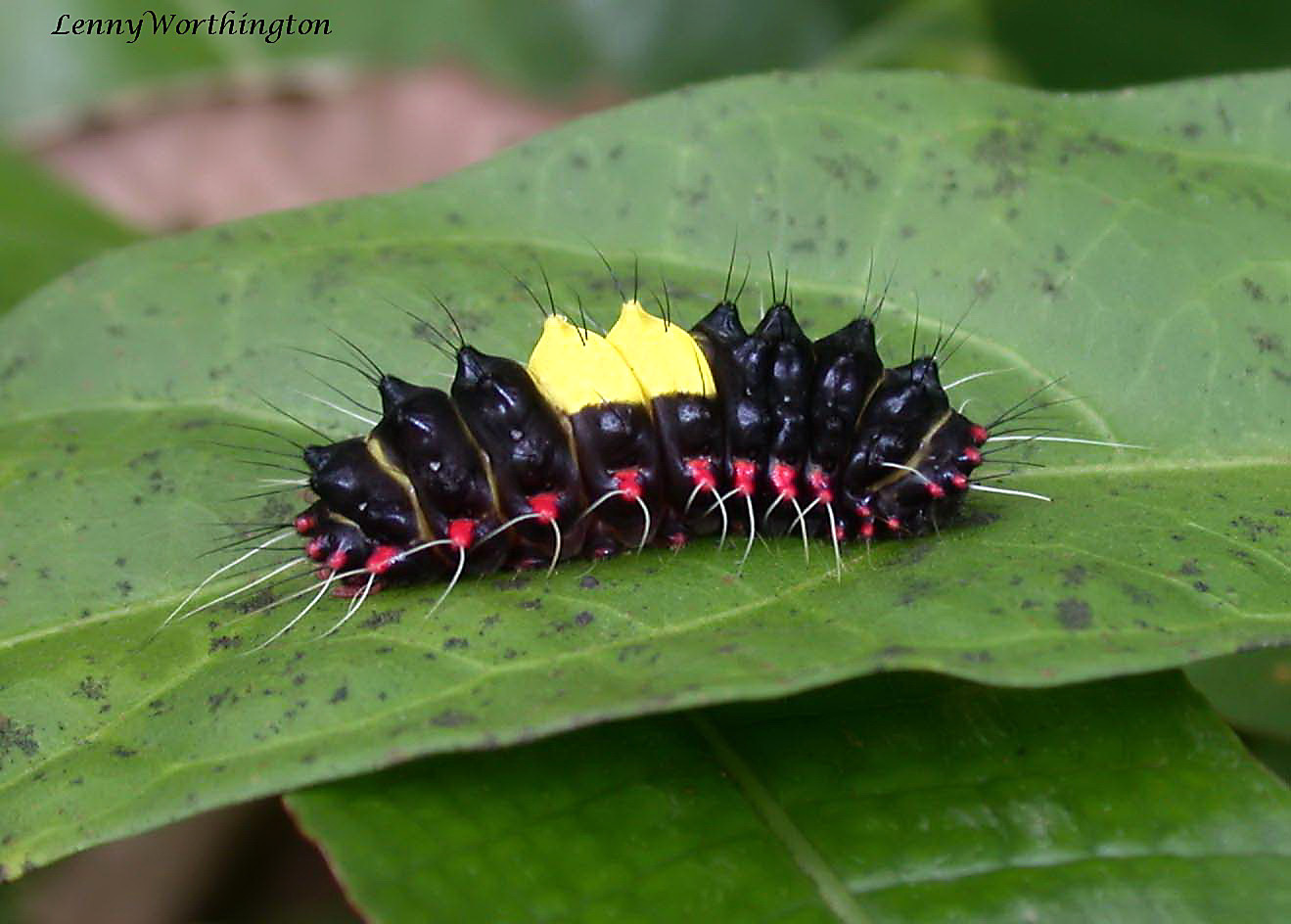
The larva of Erasmia pulchella

The larvae of the Japanese subspecies feed on Helicia cochinchinensis, Quercus acutissima, and Triadica sebifera. The larvae of the Taiwanese subspecies feed on H. cochinchinensis and Helicia formosana.

Larvae are large in size. The body is covered in black tubercles and hairs, and there is a yellow segment on the middle and rear of the larva that covers the length of two body segments. On the ventral side there are red spines that emerge from its body. When the larva is disturbed, it exudes noxious hydride compounds from the tips of the tubercules.

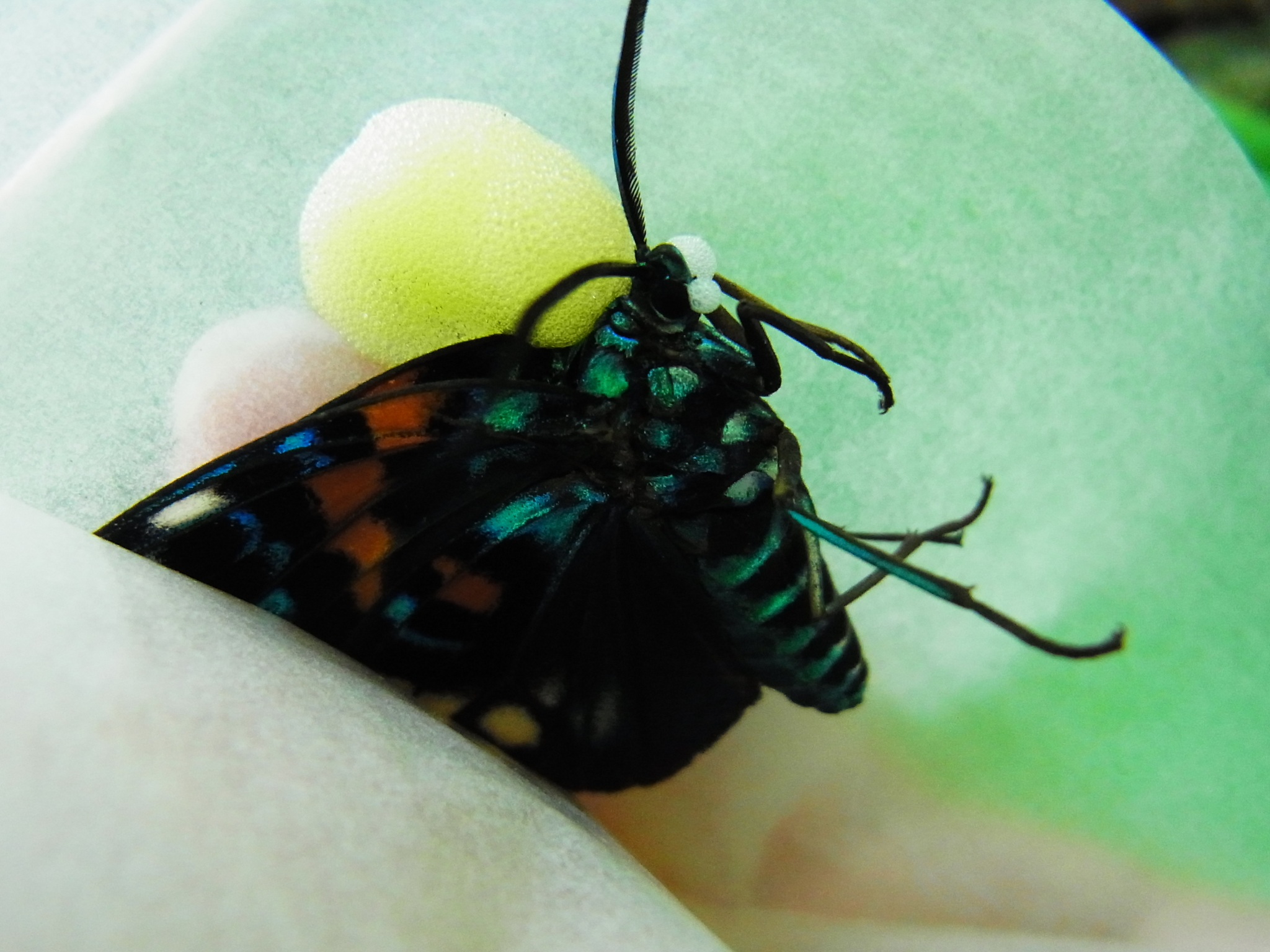
Adults, when disturbed, emit a noxious foam from their neck

The moths form their cocoons on the surfaces of leaves, or in crevices in the bark of trees.

Adults emerge twice in the year, and are found from June and July, or August in the first emergence, and September-October during the second. They fly during the day and are often found in forests with Helicia cochinchinensis trees, but also are attracted to lights. They additionally fly in low to mid altitude mountainous areas. The moths tend to fly high in the air compared to other moths. The moths feed on nectar, spending their time as an adult flying in search of food, and are particularly attracted to the nectar of Elaeagnus umbellata and Eupatorium japonicum. Erasmia pulchella is a known pollinator of Barringtonia racemosa.

To deter predators such as birds, adults exude noxious chemicals in the form of foam from the neck area. This chemical, in the form of cyanide, does not cause a reaction in contact with human skin, and can simply be washed off with water. This habit of sudden chemical expulsion can startle collectors trying to catch the moth. The compounds are derived from the larval diet of toxic plants, and the scent of the foam has been described as smelling like ginger. Adults do not accumulate toxins, and the toxins stored within its body are solely derived from their larval diet. The location from which bubbles are exuded from seem to differ by geographic region and the many subspecies which are local to, with some exuding from the tip of the legs and others exuding from the base of the wings. There has been documentation that subspecies sakishimana of the Yaeyama Islands exudes its foam through the tips of its legs. Sequencing of the specific chemicals in the moths yielded the detection of Linamarin and Lotaustralin.

In addition to birds, the moths are parasitized by Braconid wasps such as members of the genus Conspinaria. Additionally, the caterpillars are fed on by gibbons (Hoolock hoolock) in Assam. The adult moths additionally engage in mimicry complexes with other Chalcosiine moths in the genus Eterusia.

== Distribution ==
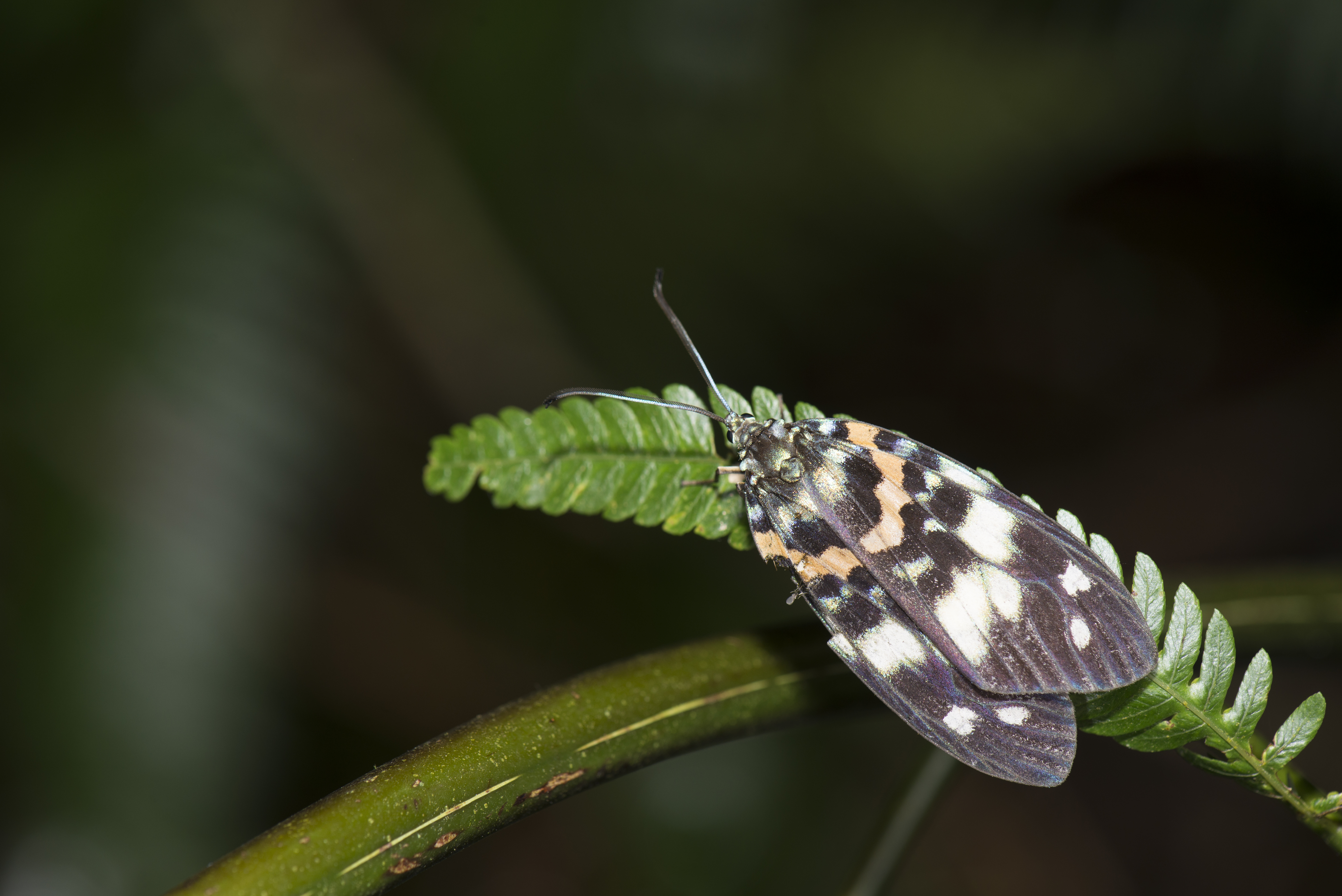
Erasmia pulchella hobsoni from Taiwan

Erasmia pulchella is found throughout Southern and Eastern Asia. Ranging from Northern India, and into Myanmar, Laos, Thailand, Vietnam, and China. Its distribution extends as far east as Taiwan and Japan.

There are four subspecies found in Japan, with its distribution stretching as far south as the Ryukyu Islands, with the furthest easternmost point being the Kii Peninsula. Its hostplant of Helicia cochinchinensis has a range that does not extend past the Tōkai region, explaining the limit. Its distribution in Japan is limited to the extent of Helicia cochinchinensis, and the moth rarely strays far from its host plant's distribution. Subspecies nipponica is found on the Japanese mainland, and is found on the islands of Honshu, Shikoku, and Kyushu. Subspecies fritzei is found on Amami Ōshima and Okinawa Prefecture. Subspecies kumageana is found on Yakushima and Tanegashima. Subspecies sakishimana is endemic to the Yaeyama Islands. The nominate subspecies pulchella is found in Northern India. Subspecies hobsoni is found on the island of Taiwan. Subspecies chinensis was described from the mountains of Myanmar by Adalbert Seitz, and is additionally found in Vietnam.

Former subspecies hainana is found on the island of Hainan in China. Former subspecies cyanea was described from Hong Kong. Former subspecies sangaica is found in Northern China and Southern Japan.

== Etymology ==
The Anglicized Taiwanese names for the moth are 山龍眼螢斑蛾, Shān lóngyǎn yíng bān é, "Mountain longan firefly stripe moth" and 雙星錦斑蛾, Shuāngxīng jǐn bān é, "Double star embroidered stripe moth". Mountain longan is the Chinese name for Helicia formosana, a foodplant for the moth's larvae. The "double star" in the other name is thought to be referring to the two white dots on the tip of the forewing. Yen Shen-Horn translated the name into English as the "Dayflying Helicia Zygaenid Moth".

The Japanese language name for Erasmia pulchella is サツマニシキ, Satsuma-nishiki, with the various members of the 4 subspecies being differentiated through their geographic location. Subspecies nipponica is known as サツマニシキ本土亜種 (Satsuma-nishiki hondo ashu, Mainland subspecies of Satsuma-nishiki). Subspecies fritzei is known as サツマニシキ奄美・沖縄本島亜種 (Satsumanishiki Amami Okinawa hontō ashu, Satsuma-nishiki Amami / Okinawa main island subspecies). Subspecies kumageana is known as サツマニシキ屋久島種子島亜種 (Satsumanishiki Yakushima Tanegashima ashu, Satsuma-nishiki Yakushima Tanegashima subspecies). Subspecies sakishimana is known as サツマニシキ八重山亜種 (Satsumanishiki Yaeyama ashu, Satsuma-nishiki Yaeyama subspecies), and is informally known as ヤエヤマニシキ, Yaeyama-nishiki. The term satsuma, refers to the region of the same name. The term "nishiki" in its name alludes to a type of Japanese patterned silk fabric with gold threads, of which the wings resemble.
