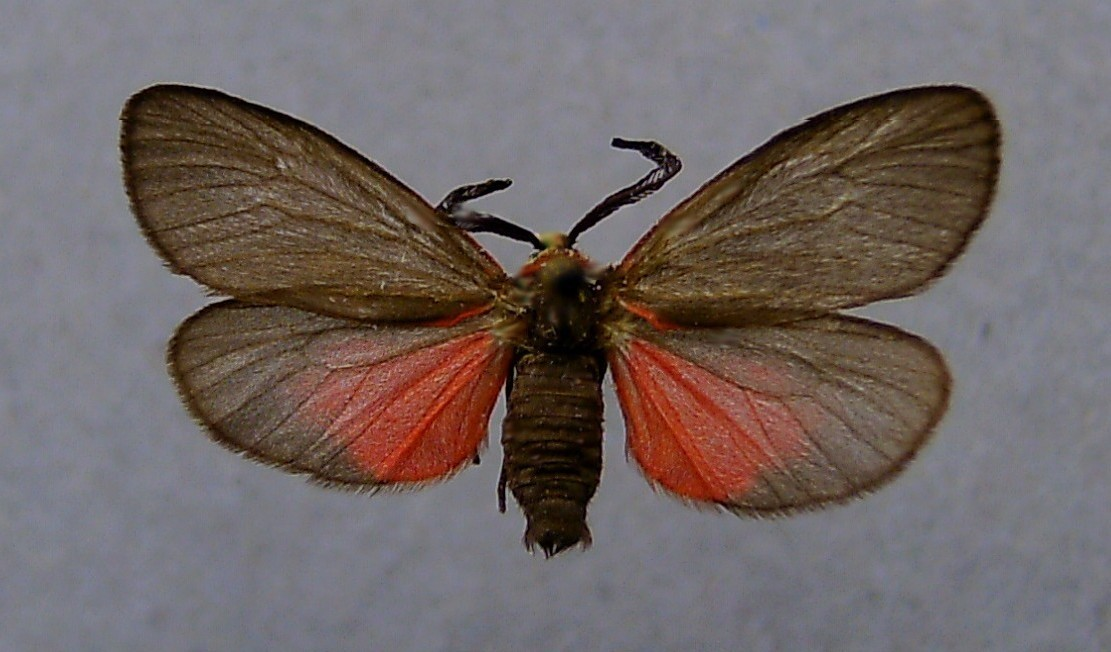
- Aglaope infausta

Scientific classification
- Kingdom: Animalia
- Phylum: Arthropoda
- Clade: Pancrustacea
- Class: Insecta
- Order: Lepidoptera
- Family: Zygaenidae
- Subfamily: Chalcosiinae
- Genus: Aglaope; Latreille, 1809

= Aglaope (moth) =

Genus of moths

Aglaope is a genus of moths of the family Zygaenidae.

== Selected species ==
- Aglaope infausta – almond-tree leaf skeletonizer moth (Linnaeus, 1767)
- Aglaope labasi
- Aglaope meridionalis
- Aglaope sanguifasciata
