= Chalcosia pretiosa =

Scientific classification
- Kingdom: Animalia
- Phylum: Arthropoda
- Class: Insecta
- Order: Lepidoptera
- Family: Zygaenidae
- Genus: Chalcosia
- Species: C. pretiosa

Binomial name
- Chalcosia pretiosa Walker, [1865]

Species of moth

Chalcosia pretiosa is a moth in the family Zygaenidae. It was described by Francis Walker in 1865 from Sri Lanka. Two subspecies are recorded.

== Subspecies ==
- C. p. pretiosa
- C. p. albina Hampson, 1893
- C. p. eximia Jordan, 1907
