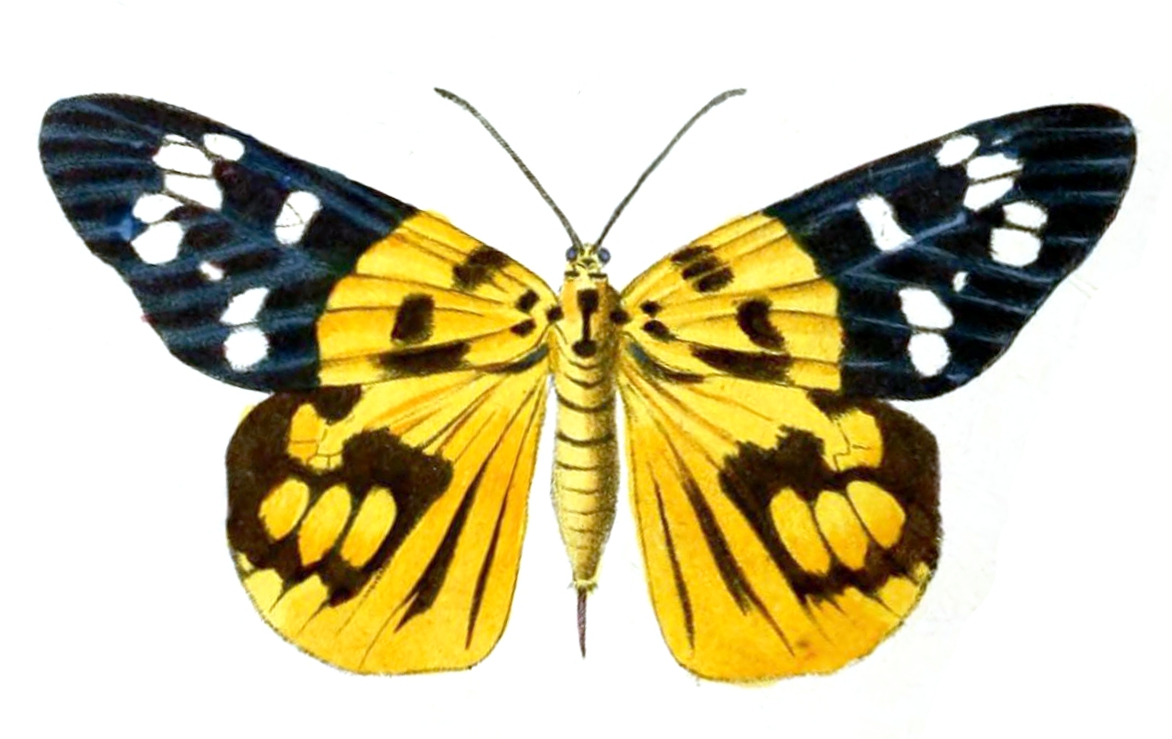
- Psaphis euschemoides

Scientific classification
- Domain: Eukaryota
- Kingdom: Animalia
- Phylum: Arthropoda
- Class: Insecta
- Order: Lepidoptera
- Family: Zygaenidae
- Subfamily: Chalcosiinae
- Genus: Psaphis; Walker, 1854

Type species
- Psaphis camadeva Walker, 1854

= Psaphis (moth) =

Genus of moths

Psaphis is a genus of moths in the family Zygaenidae first described by Francis Walker in 1854.

== Distribution ==
It is found in Southeast Asia and Australasia.

== Species ==
The Catalogue of Life lists the following species, some of which appear to be synonyms:

- Psaphis albivitta Rothschild, 1900
- Psaphis borneensis
- Psaphis camadeva Walker, 1854 - type species (synonym Psaphis natunensis Rothschild, 1896)
- Psaphis celebensis
- Psaphis euschemoides Moore, 1865
- Psaphis gloriosus
- Psaphis javana
- Psaphis javanicus
- Psaphis leonina (Butler, 1879)
- Psaphis resumpta
- Psaphis rothschildi Joicey & Talbot, 1922
- Psaphis scotais
- Psaphis semiplena
