= Eusphalera =

Scientific classification
- Kingdom: Animalia
- Phylum: Arthropoda
- Clade: Pancrustacea
- Class: Insecta
- Order: Lepidoptera
- Family: Zygaenidae
- Subfamily: Chalcosiinae
- Genus: Eusphalera; Jordan, 1907

Genus of moths

Eusphalera is a genus of moths of the family Zygaenidae.

== Species ==
- Eusphalera bicolora Bethune-Baker, 1908
- Eusphalera casta Jordan, 1915
- Eusphalera regina (Rothschild & Jordan, 1903)
- Eusphalera satisbonensis Jordan, 1915
- Eusphalera splendens Bethune-Baker, 1908
