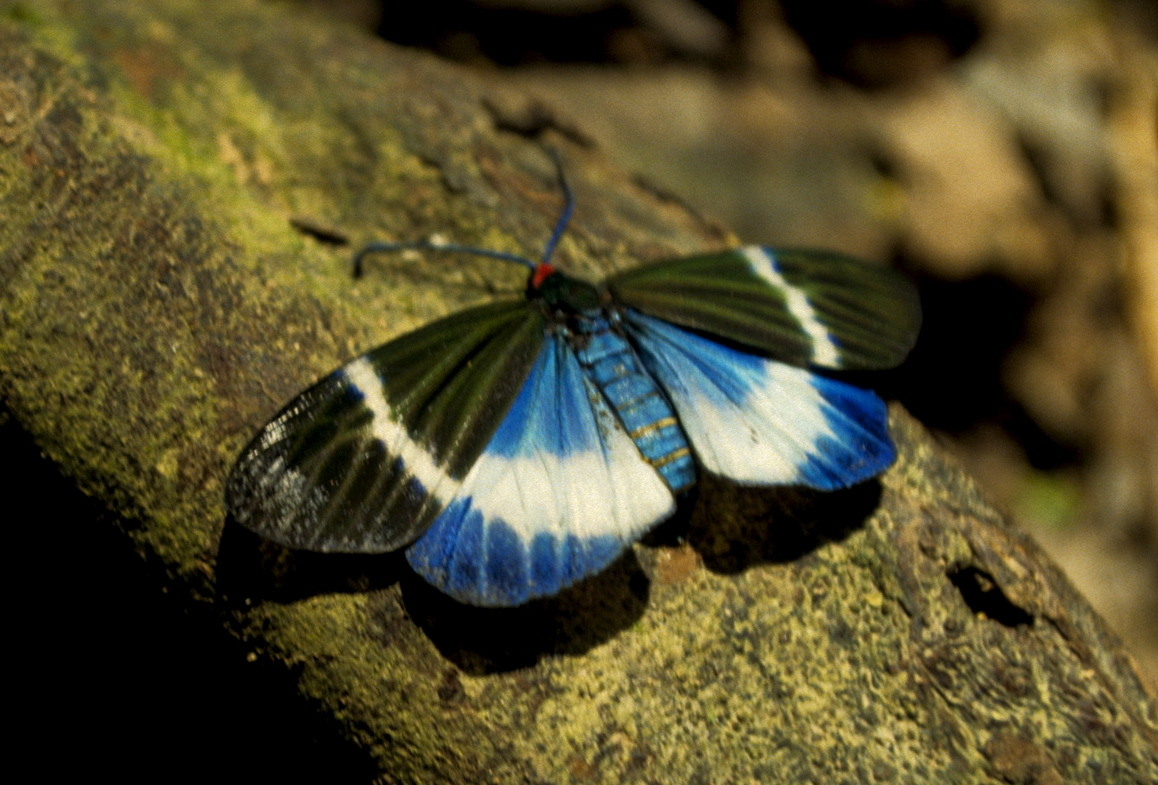
- Chalcosia zehma

Scientific classification
- Kingdom: Animalia
- Phylum: Arthropoda
- Clade: Pancrustacea
- Class: Insecta
- Order: Lepidoptera
- Family: Zygaenidae
- Subfamily: Chalcosiinae
- Genus: Chalcosia; Hübner, 1819

Type species
- Sphinx pectinicornis (Linnaeus, 1758)

Synonyms
- Charmona Billberg, 1820

= Chalcosia =

Genus of moths

Chalcosia is a genus of moths in the family Zygaenidae.

== Species ==
- Chalcosia affinis (Guérin-Méneville, 1843)
- Chalcosia alpherakyi Leech, 1898
- Chalcosia coliadoides
- Chalcosia contradicta Inoue, 1991
- Chalcosia flavicollis Jordan, 1907
- Chalcosia formosana Matsumura, 1911
- Chalcosia nympha Moore, 1878
- Chalcosia pectinicornis (Linnaeus, 1758)
- Chalcosia pretiosa Walker, [1865]
- Chalcosia venosa Walker, 1854
- Chalcosia zehma Herrich-Schäffer, [1853]
