= Herpolasia =

Scientific classification
- Kingdom: Animalia
- Phylum: Arthropoda
- Clade: Pancrustacea
- Class: Insecta
- Order: Lepidoptera
- Family: Zygaenidae
- Subfamily: Chalcosiinae
- Genus: Herpolasia; Rothschild & Jordan, 1905

Genus of moths

Herpolasia is a genus of moths of the Zygaenidae family.

== Species ==
- Herpolasia augarra Rothschild & Jordan, 1905
