= Clematoessa =

Scientific classification
- Kingdom: Animalia
- Phylum: Arthropoda
- Class: Insecta
- Order: Lepidoptera
- Family: Zygaenidae
- Subfamily: Chalcosiinae
- Genus: Clematoessa; Jordan, 1915

Genus of moths

Clematoessa is a genus of moths of the Zygaenidae family.

== Species ==
- Clematoessa xuthomelas Jordan, 1915
