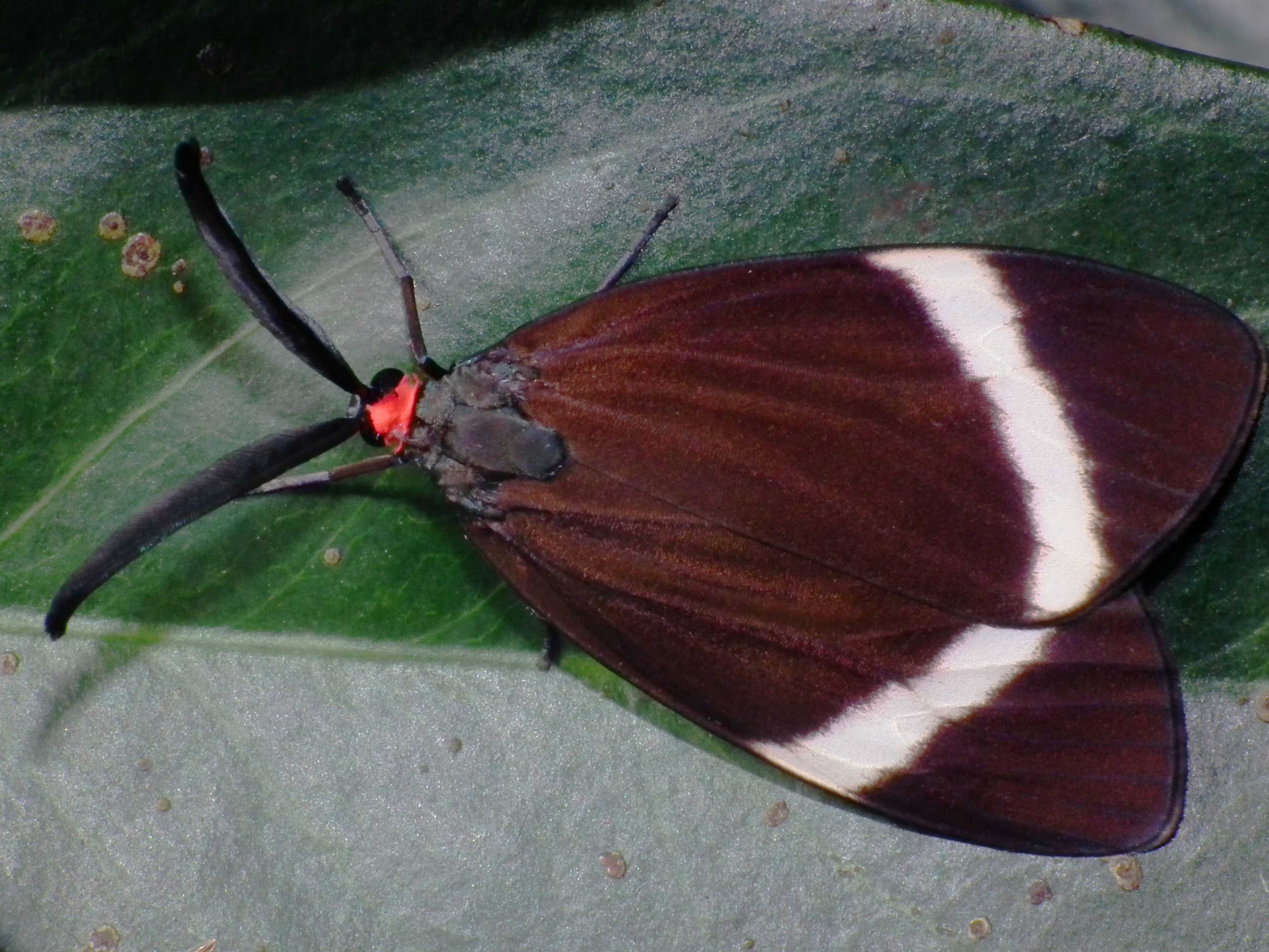

Scientific classification
- Kingdom: Animalia
- Phylum: Arthropoda
- Class: Insecta
- Order: Lepidoptera
- Family: Zygaenidae
- Subfamily: Chalcosiinae
- Genus: Pidorus; Walker, 1854

= Pidorus =

Genus of moths

Pidorus is a genus of moths belonging to the family Zygaenidae.

The species of this genus are found in Southeastern Asia.

== Species ==
Species:

- Pidorus albifascia Moore, 1879
- Pidorus atratus Butler, 1877
- Pidorus bifasciata Walker, 1883
- Pidorus chalybeatus Joicey & Talbot, 1922
- Pidorus circe Herrich-Schäffer, 1853
- Pidorus constrictus Walker, 1854
- Pidorus corculum Butler, 1879
- Pidorus cyrtus Jordan, 1907
- Pidorus euchromioides Walker, 1864
- Pidorus gemina Walker, 1854
- Pidorus glaucopis Drury, 1773
- Pidorus hilaris Jordan, 1907
- Pidorus latifasciata Talbot, 1929
- Pidorus leechi Jordan, 1907
- Pidorus leno Swinhoe, 1900
- Pidorus miles Butler, 1881
- Pidorus ochrolophus Mell, 1922
- Pidorus splendens Jordan, 1907
- Pidorus truncatus Jordan, 1907
