= Chalcosia venosa =

Scientific classification
- Kingdom: Animalia
- Phylum: Arthropoda
- Class: Insecta
- Order: Lepidoptera
- Family: Zygaenidae
- Genus: Chalcosia
- Species: C. venosa

Binomial name
- Chalcosia venosa Walker, 1854

Synonyms
- Chalcosia myrrhina Hampson, 1892; Chalcosia quadrifasciata Moore, 1882; Chalcosia similata Moore, 1882; Chalcosia thallo Hampson, 1892

Species of moth

Chalcosia venosa is a moth in the family Zygaenidae. It was described by Francis Walker in 1854 from Sri Lanka.
