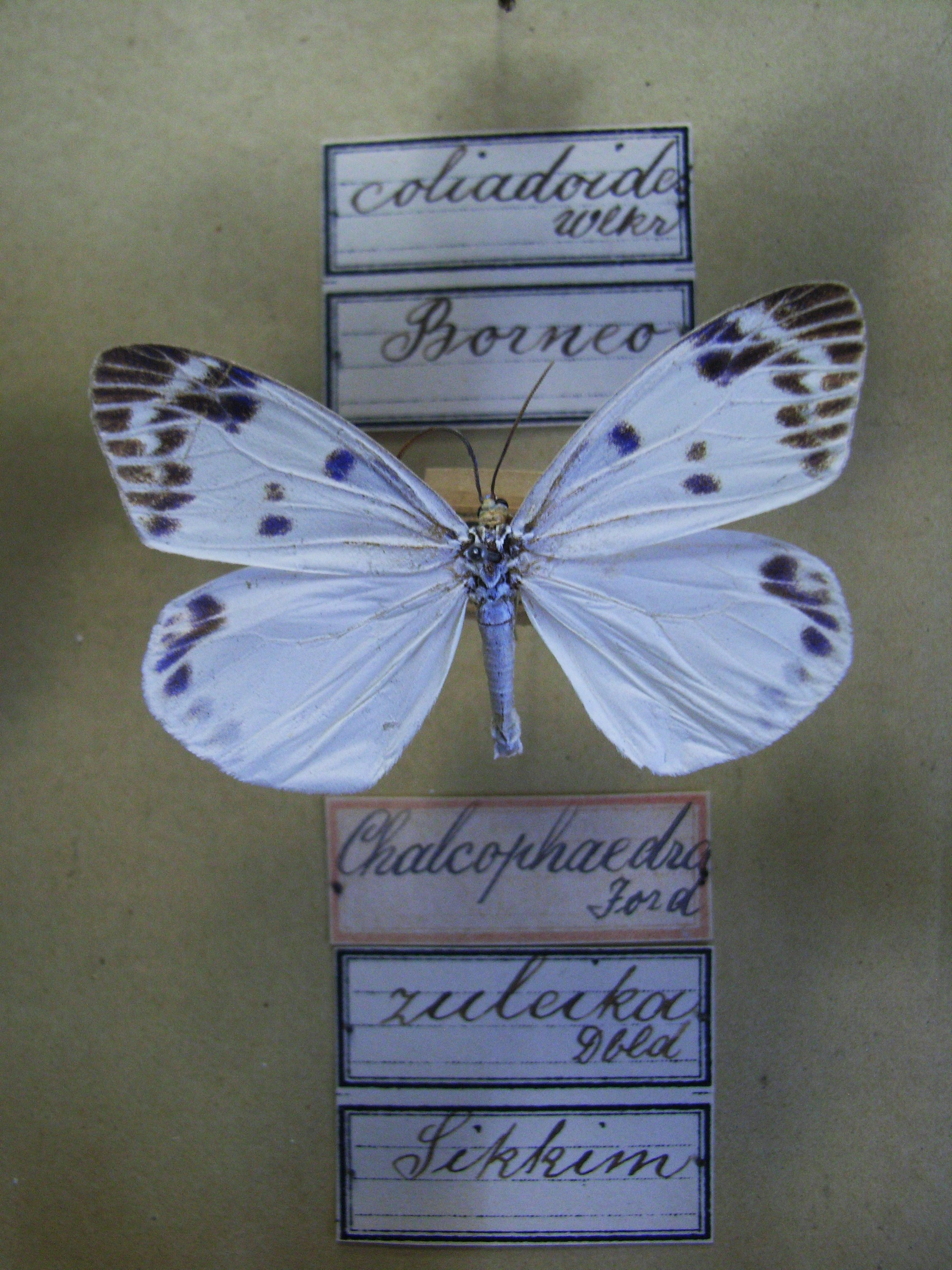

Scientific classification
- Kingdom: Animalia
- Phylum: Arthropoda
- Class: Insecta
- Order: Lepidoptera
- Family: Zygaenidae
- Genus: Chalcosia
- Species: C. coliadoides

Binomial name
- Chalcosia coliadoides Walker, 1862

Synonyms
- Campylotes coliadoides

= Chalcosia coliadoides =

Species of moth

Chalcosia coliadoides is a moth of the family Zygaenidae. It is found in south-east Asia, including Sumatra, Burma, Annam, Malacca, Borneo, Bangka Island, Nias, Enggano and Java.

The wingspan is about 60 mm.
