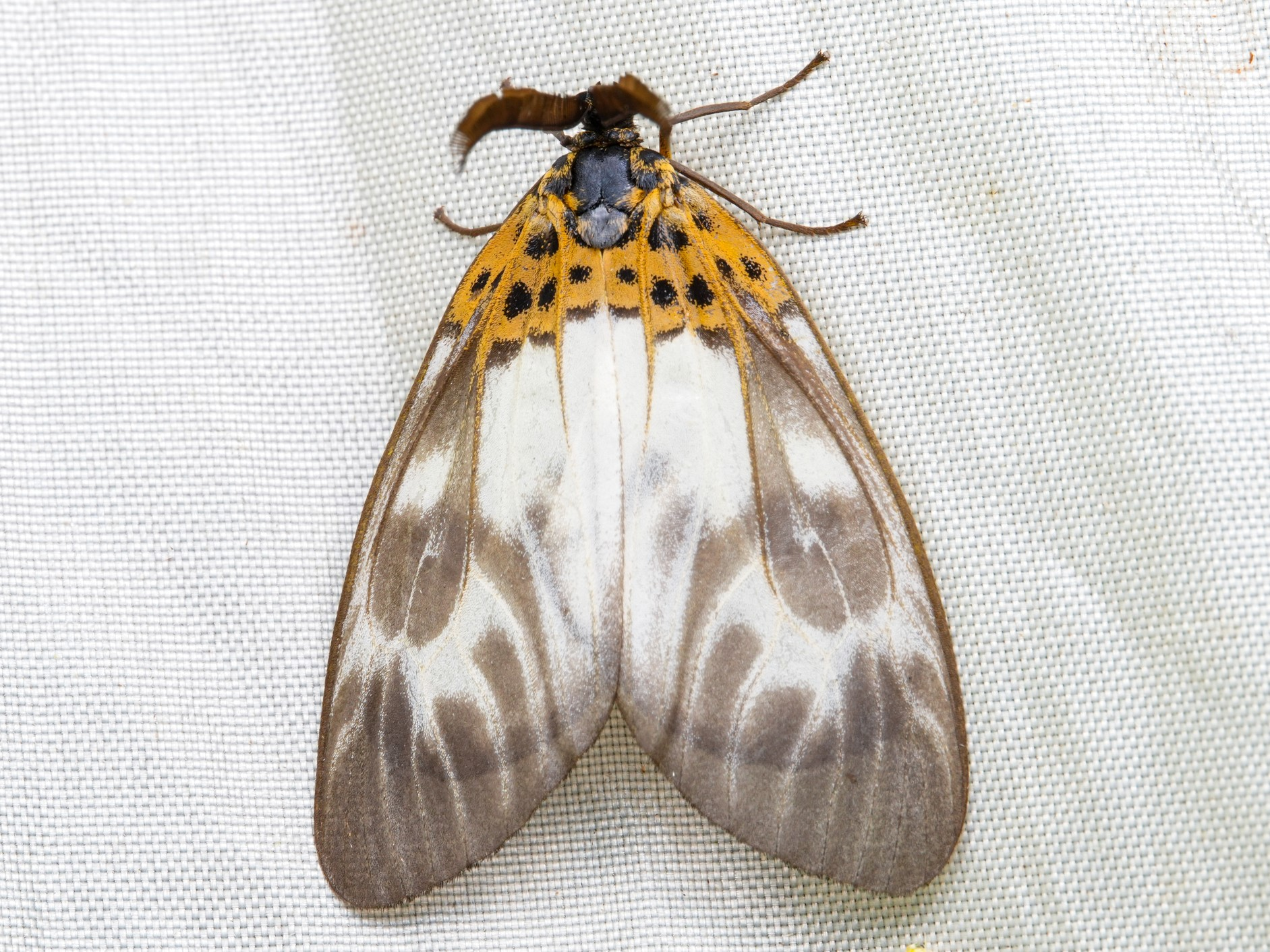
- Philopator rotunda

Scientific classification
- Domain: Eukaryota
- Kingdom: Animalia
- Phylum: Arthropoda
- Class: Insecta
- Order: Lepidoptera
- Family: Zygaenidae
- Genus: Philopator; Moore, 1866

= Philopator (moth) =

Genus of moths

Philopator is a genus of moths in the family Zygaenidae.

== Species ==
Species:

- Philopator basimaculata Moore, 1866
- Philopator flavofasciata Matsumura, 1911
- Philopator rotunda Hampson, 1896
