= Hampsonia =

Scientific classification
- Domain: Eukaryota
- Kingdom: Animalia
- Phylum: Arthropoda
- Class: Insecta
- Order: Lepidoptera
- Family: Zygaenidae
- Genus: Hampsonia; Swinhoe, 1894

Genus of moths

Hampsonia is a genus of moths belonging to the family Zygaenidae.

== Species ==
Species:

- Hampsonia bifasciata Tremewan, 1960
- Hampsonia pulcherrima Swinhoe, 1894
