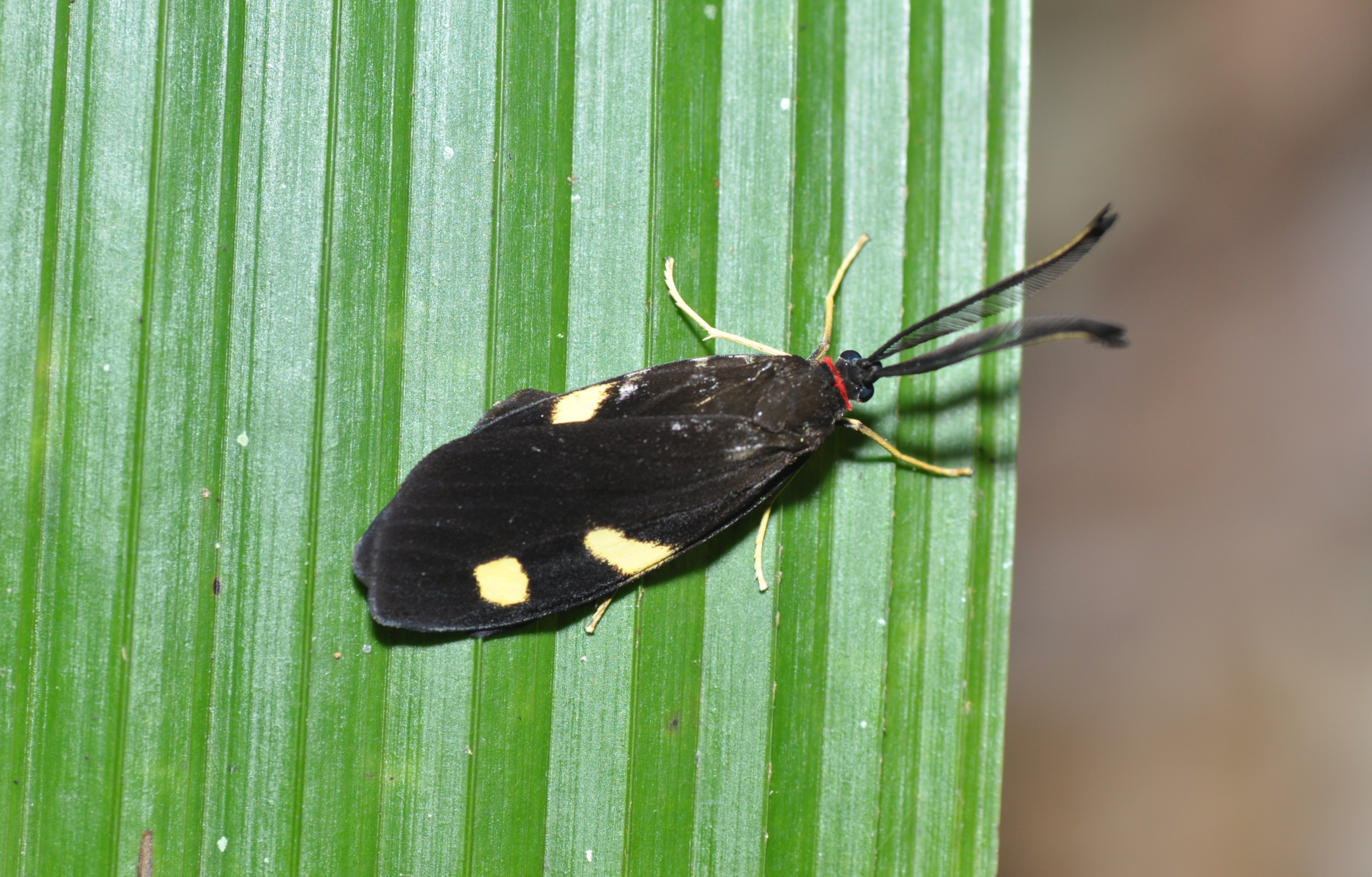
- Soritia

Scientific classification
- Kingdom: Animalia
- Phylum: Arthropoda
- Class: Insecta
- Order: Lepidoptera
- Family: Zygaenidae
- Genus: Soritia; Walker, 1854

= Soritia =

Genus of moths

Soritia is a genus of moths belonging to the family Zygaenidae.

The species of this genus are found in Western Africa and Southeastern Asia.

== Species ==
Species:

- Soritia angustipennis Röber, 1897
- Soritia azurea Yen, 2003
- Soritia bicolor Moore, 1884
- Soritia binotata Mell, 1922
- Soritia cecilia Oberthür, 1923
- Soritia choui Yen & Yang, 1998
- Soritia circinata Herrich-Schäffer, 1854
- Soritia costimacula Aurivillius, 1894
- Soritia elizabetha Walker, 1854
- Soritia lydia Oberthür, 1923
- Soritia moerens Oberthür, 1910
- Soritia nigribasalis Hampson, 1892
- Soritia pulchella Kollar, 1844
- Soritia risa Doubleday, 1844
- Soritia sevastopuloi Tremewan, 1960
- Soritia shahama Moore, 1865
- Soritia strandi Kishida, 1995
- Soritia viridibasalis Dudgeon, 1905
