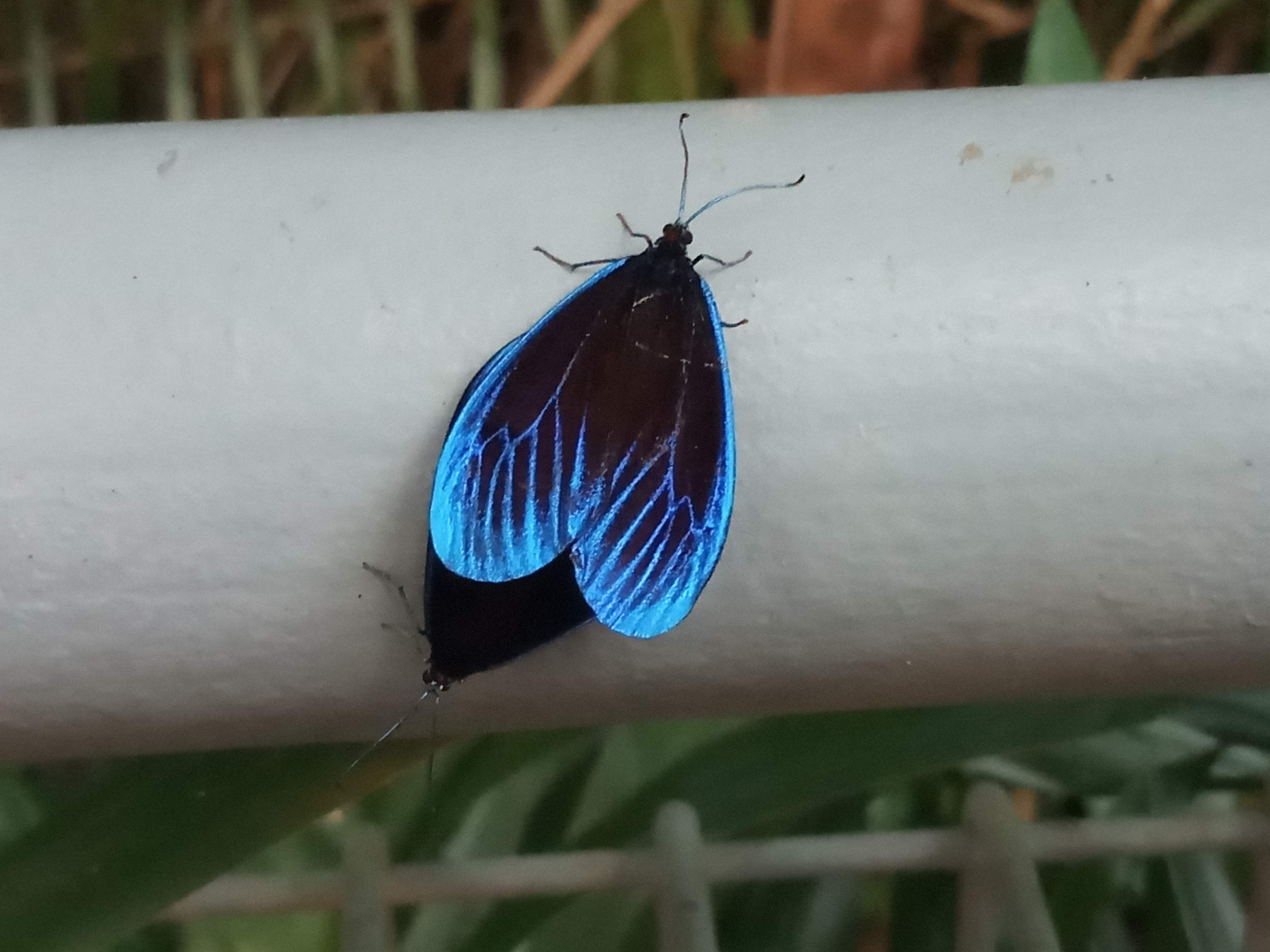

Scientific classification
- Domain: Eukaryota
- Kingdom: Animalia
- Phylum: Arthropoda
- Class: Insecta
- Order: Lepidoptera
- Family: Zygaenidae
- Genus: Pompelon; Walker, 1854
- Species: P. marginata

Binomial name
- Pompelon marginata Guérin-Meneville, 1843

Synonyms
- Gynautocera marginata Guérin-Méneville, 1843; Pompelon philippinensis H. Druce, 1891; Pompelon anethussa Druce, 1891

= Pompelon =

Genus of moths

Pompelon is a monotypic moth genus in the family Zygaenidae erected by Francis Walker in 1854. Its only species, Pompelon marginata, was first described by Félix Édouard Guérin-Méneville in 1843. It is a day-flying moth found throughout Southeast Asia, with sightings in the Philippines, Myanmar, Thailand, Sulawesi, Borneo, Peninsular Malaysia, Singapore, and Sumatra.

Larvae feed exclusively on Cinnamomum. They often are spotted resting on wild cinnamon trees.

Members of this species mimic various species of Euploea. Its larvae have been observed being parasitized by members of the tachinid fly species Senometopia distincta.

== Description ==
P. marginata is a mid-sized day-flying moth with predominantly black and rounded wings, with iridescent blue margins. Its head is surrounded by a red band that resembles that of a collar. Its body stands in stark contrast to its dark dorsal side, having a bright red thorax and abdomen. With its abdomen having a series of black dots along each segment. P. marginata's legs are black with a blue metallic sheen.

== Life history ==
P. marginata's caterpillars feed exclusively on Cinnamomum, with each subspecies having a specific species that they feed on. Subspecies found in Singapore have been observed feeding on Cinnamomum iners, whereas others in Borneo and Peninsular Malaysia have been observed feeding on Cinnamomum verum.

The larva is predominantly ivory in color, with an uneven distribution of black markings. On the dorsal end, there are verrucae distributed on each segment, they are tipped with black. On these verrucae, there are fine setae, even on the ones distributed on the flanks. When disturbed, the larva emits a clear liquid, potentially serving as a defense mechanism against predation.

The pupa tends to bend a single leaf in a U-shaped pattern, forming a brown silk sheet with the tip of the pupa extending out of the sheet. There are also fine white silk threads that emanate from the center of the pupa.

== Subspecies ==
T. Endo and Y. Kishida (1999) report six subspecies of P. marginata.

- Pompelon marginata acrocyanea Herrich-Schaffer, 1843 (Java)
- Pompelon marginata ampliatum Butler, 1878 (Sulawesi)
- Pompelon marginata baweana Hering, 1992 (Bawean)
- Pompelon marginata glenum Jordan, 1907 (Southwest Sumatra)
- Pompelon marginata marginata Guerin, 1843 (Thailand, Myanmar, Peninsular Malaysia, Borneo, Philippines)
- Pompelon marginata modesta Dohrn, 1906 (North Sumatra)
