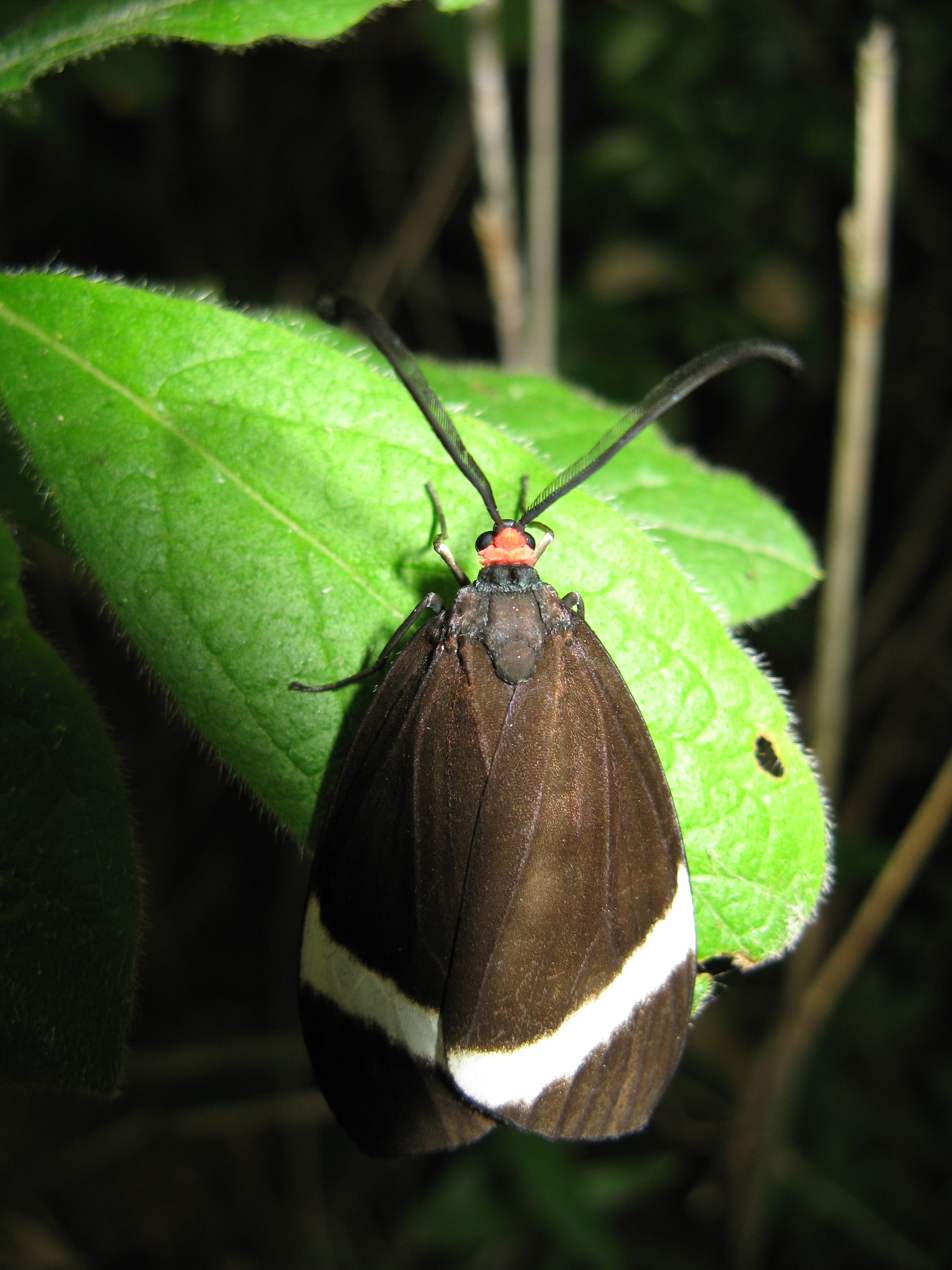

Scientific classification
- Kingdom: Animalia
- Phylum: Arthropoda
- Class: Insecta
- Order: Lepidoptera
- Family: Zygaenidae
- Genus: Pidorus
- Species: P. glaucopis

Binomial name
- Pidorus glaucopis Drury, 1773

= Pidorus glaucopis =

Species of moth

Pidorus glaucopis is a moth of the family Zygaenidae. It is found in Nepal, northern India, Indochina, the Malay Peninsula, Korea and Japan.

Pidorus glaucopis filmed in June in Tokyo
