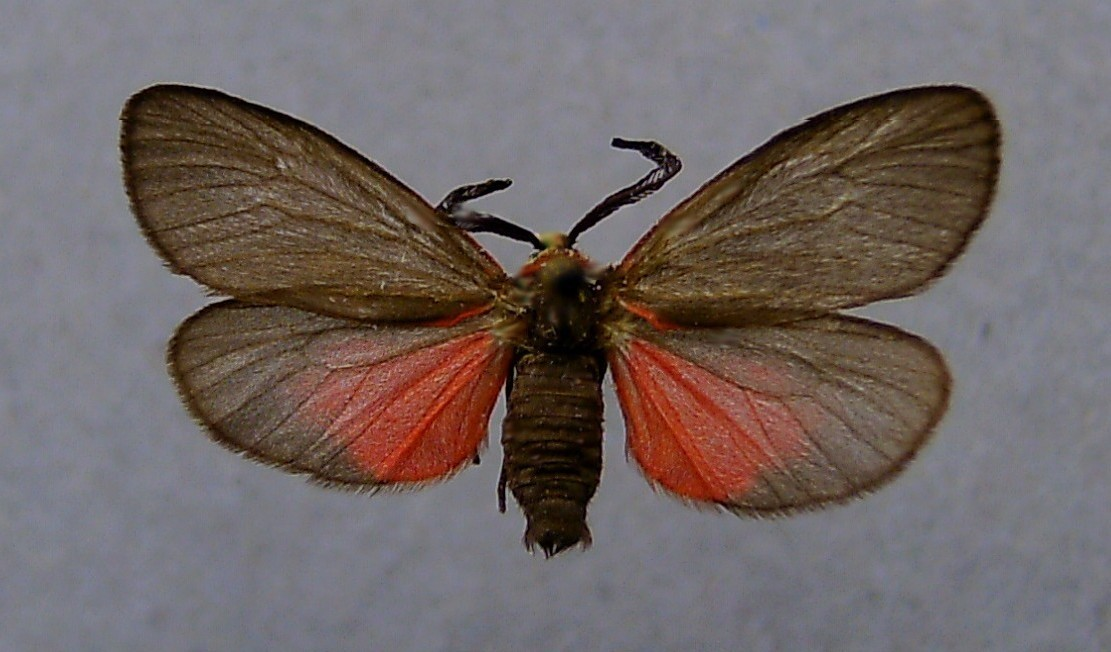

Scientific classification
- Kingdom: Animalia
- Phylum: Arthropoda
- Class: Insecta
- Order: Lepidoptera
- Family: Zygaenidae
- Genus: Aglaope
- Species: A. infausta

Binomial name
- Aglaope infausta (Linnaeus, 1767)

Synonyms
- Sphinx infausta Linnaeus, 1767

= Aglaope infausta =

Species of moth

Aglaope infausta, or almond-tree leaf skeletonizer moth, is a moth of the family Zygaenidae.

== Description ==
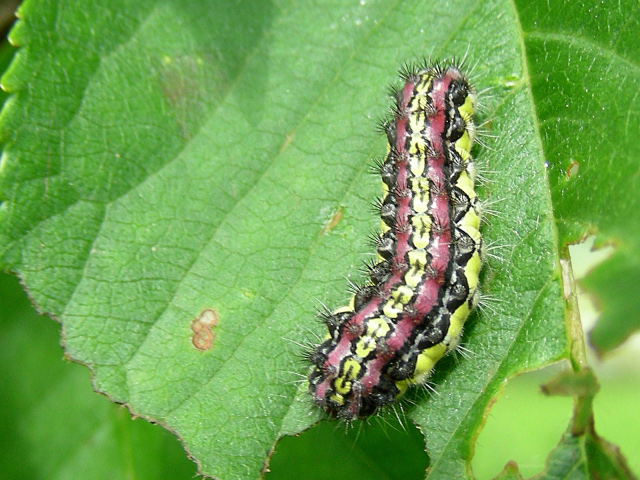
Larva

The wings are gray with some red towards the base. The thorax is black and is crossed with a red band. The wingspan is about 15 millimetres (0.6 in). The caterpillar can retract its head into its prothorax. A yellow band with black spots runs along the caterpillar's dorsum. The pupation usually starts in early June as an elongated cocoon that is whitish or light brown. The pupa is pink or yellowish and is 10 mm (0.4 in) long. The larvae feed upon Prunus spinosa, Crataegus sp., Cotoneaster sp., and other species in the family Rosaceae. The species is a pest on foliage and young fruit. The species shows a very low level of genetic heterogeneity for a lepidopteran species, but it does not affect the species' viability. In the Ice Age, differentiation into two genetic lineages occurred.

== Mating ==
The external male sex organs are subject to sexual selection by the female. The male may rub the female's abdomen with its valva during mating. Successful sperm transfer depends upon whether the male spermatophore will fit into the opening of the female ductus seminalis. In a study of sex pheromones, Aglaope infausta was one of the species attracted by tortricids pheromones and caught in the traps.

== Habitat ==
A. infausta is found in Portugal, Spain, France and north-western Italy reaching its north-eastern distribution limit in western Germany. The habitat has to be hot and dry. The species lives in bushy, warm, steppe regions and in forests. The species sometimes shares the habitat of Heterogynis penella.
