= Eucorma =

Scientific classification
- Kingdom: Animalia
- Phylum: Arthropoda
- Clade: Pancrustacea
- Class: Insecta
- Order: Lepidoptera
- Family: Zygaenidae
- Genus: Eucorma; Jordan, 1907

Genus of moths

Eucorma is a genus of moths belonging to the family Zygaenidae.

== Species ==
Species:

- Eucorma euphaena Jordan, 1907
- Eucorma hampsoni Holland, 1900
- Eucorma intercisa Walker, 1854
- Eucorma obliquaria Fabricius, 1787
