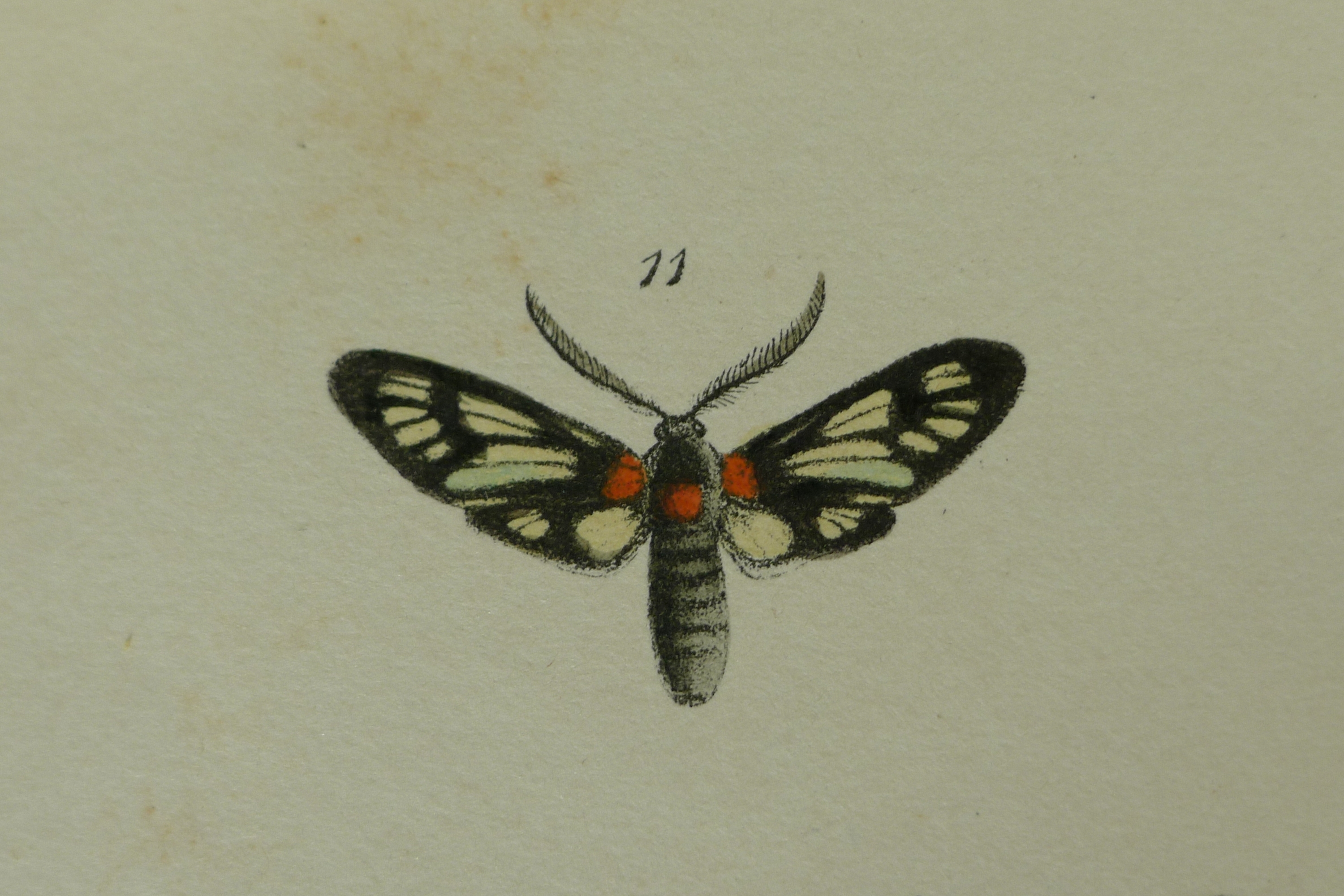
- Phacusa crawfurdi

Scientific classification
- Kingdom: Animalia
- Phylum: Arthropoda
- Class: Insecta
- Order: Lepidoptera
- Family: Zygaenidae
- Subfamily: Procridinae
- Genus: Phacusa; Walker, 1854

= Phacusa (moth) =

Genus of moths

Phacusa is a genus of moths in the family Zygaenidae.

== Species ==
- Phacusa birmana Oberthür, 1894
- Phacusa chalcobasis Hampson, 1919
- Phacusa crawfurdi (Moore, 1859)
- Phacusa discoidalis Swinhoe, 1903
- Phacusa dolosa Walker, 1856
- Phacusa inermis Alberti, 1954
- Phacusa khasiana Moore, 1879
- Phacusa manilensis Hampson, 1919
- Phacusa nicobarica Hampson, 1919
- Phacusa paracybele Alberti, 1954
- Phacusa properta Swinhoe, 1890
- Phacusa subtilis Hering, 1925
- Phacusa tenebrosa Walker, 1854
- Phacusa tonkinensis Alberti, 1954
