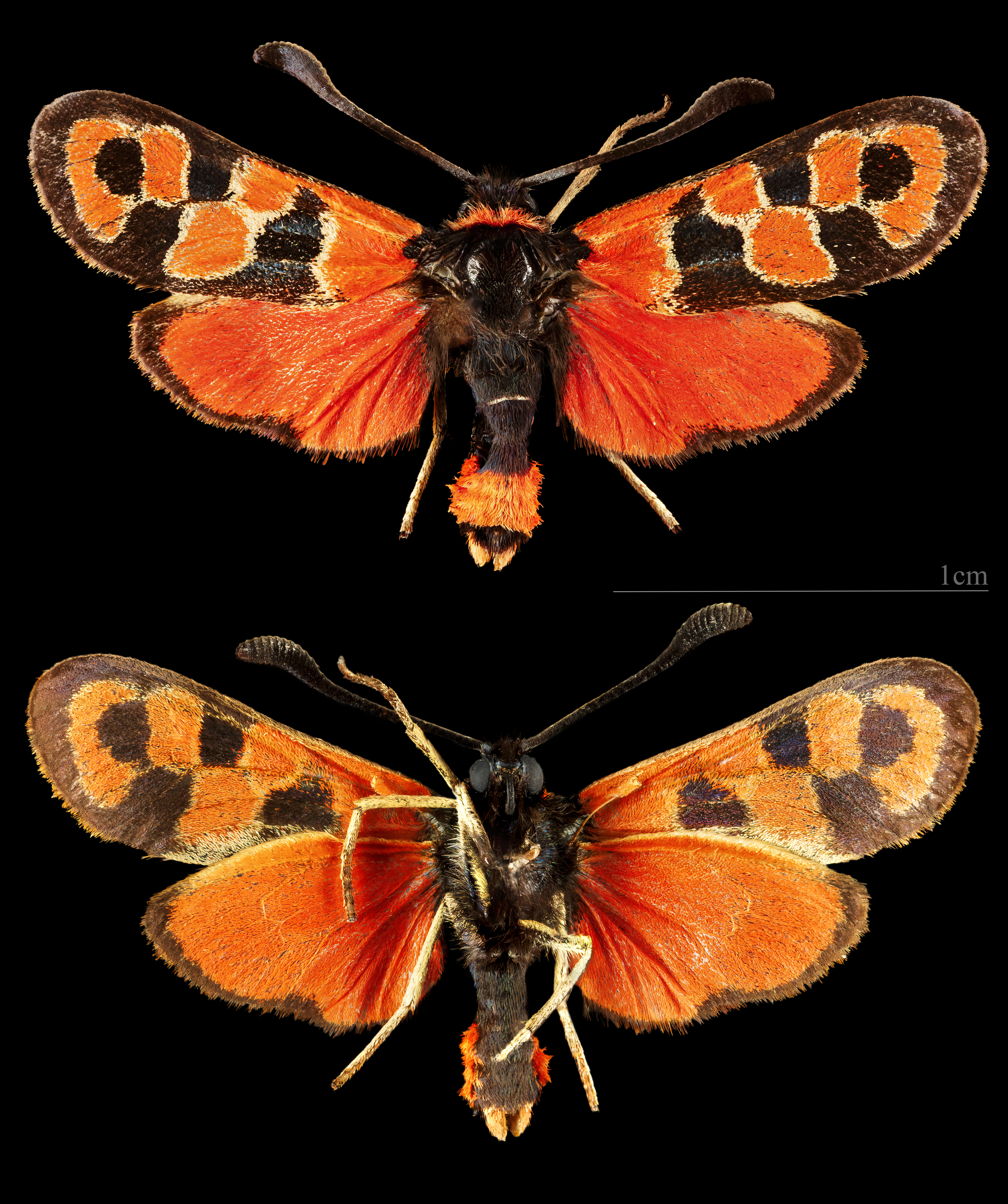
- Male

Scientific classification
- Kingdom: Animalia
- Phylum: Arthropoda
- Clade: Pancrustacea
- Class: Insecta
- Order: Lepidoptera
- Family: Zygaenidae
- Genus: Zygaena
- Species: Z. fausta

Binomial name
- Zygaena fausta (Linnaeus, 1767)

Synonyms
- Sphinx fausta Linnaeus, 1767; Zygaena faustina Ochsenheimer, 1908; Zygaena baetica Ramburs, 1839; Zygaena faustula Rambur, 1866; Zygaena mauritanica Mabille, 1885; Anthocera mabillei Kirby, 1892; Zyganea fausta v. murciensis Reiss, 1922; Zygaena gibraltarica Tremewan, 1961; Zygaena almerica Burgeff, 1963; Zygaena aitanae Burgeff & Klaue, 1968; Zygaena resender Burgeff, 1969

= Zygaena fausta =

Species of moth

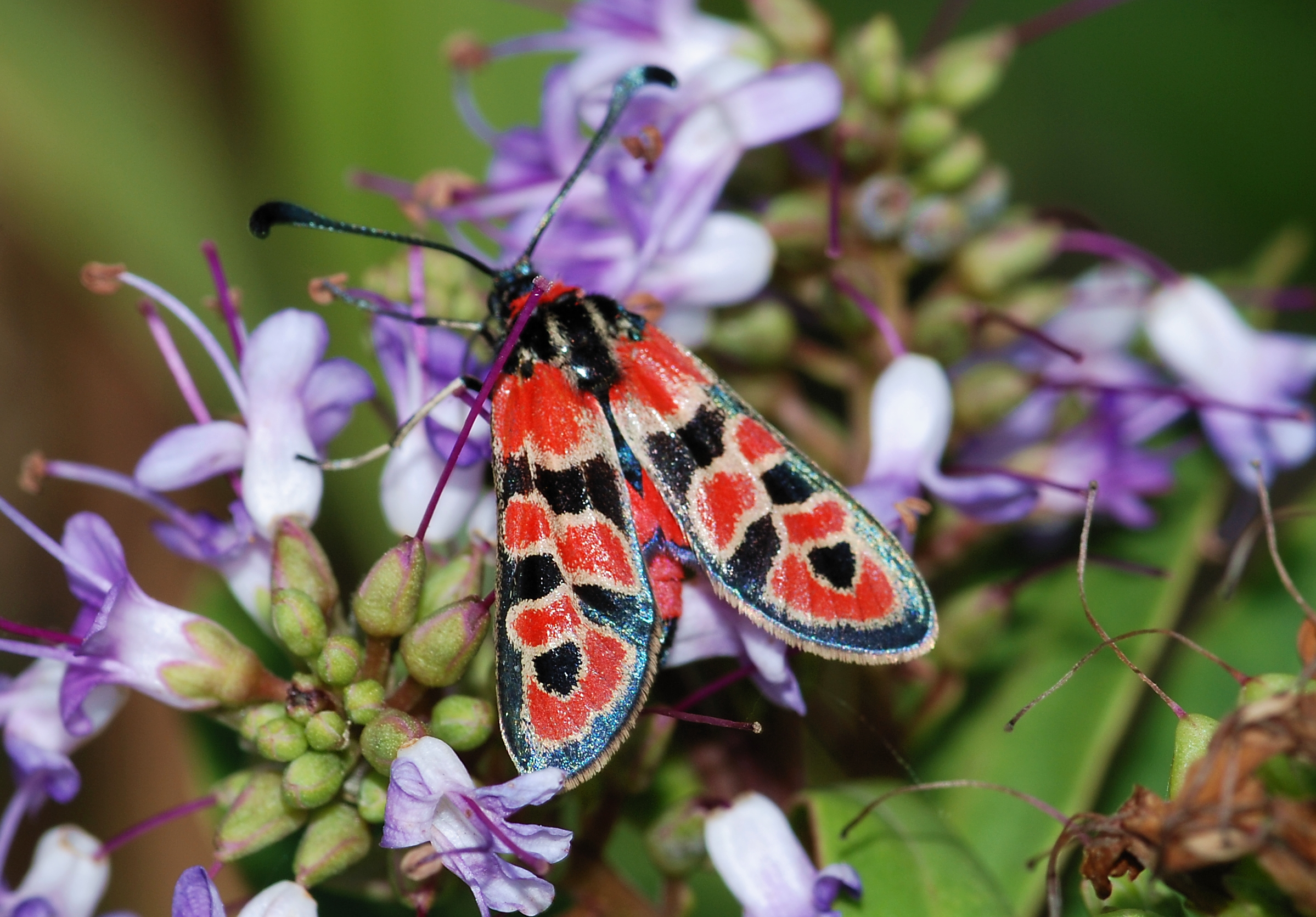
Zygaena fausta

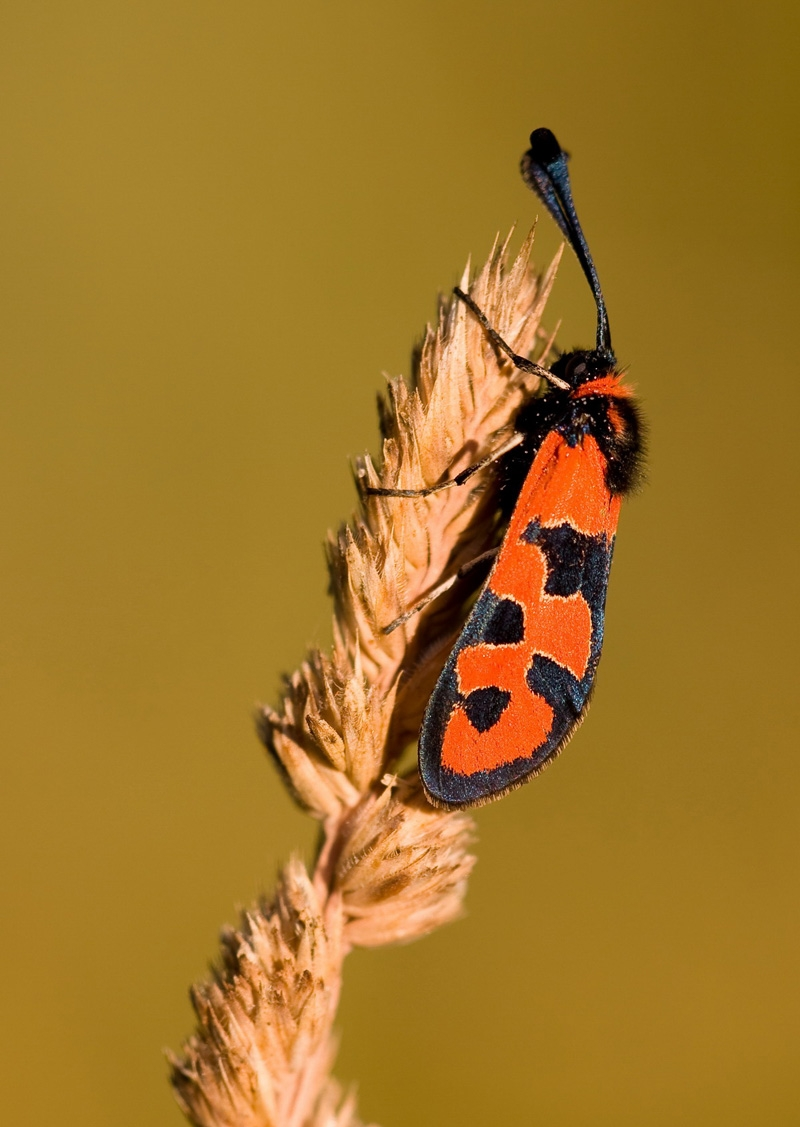
Zygaena fausta

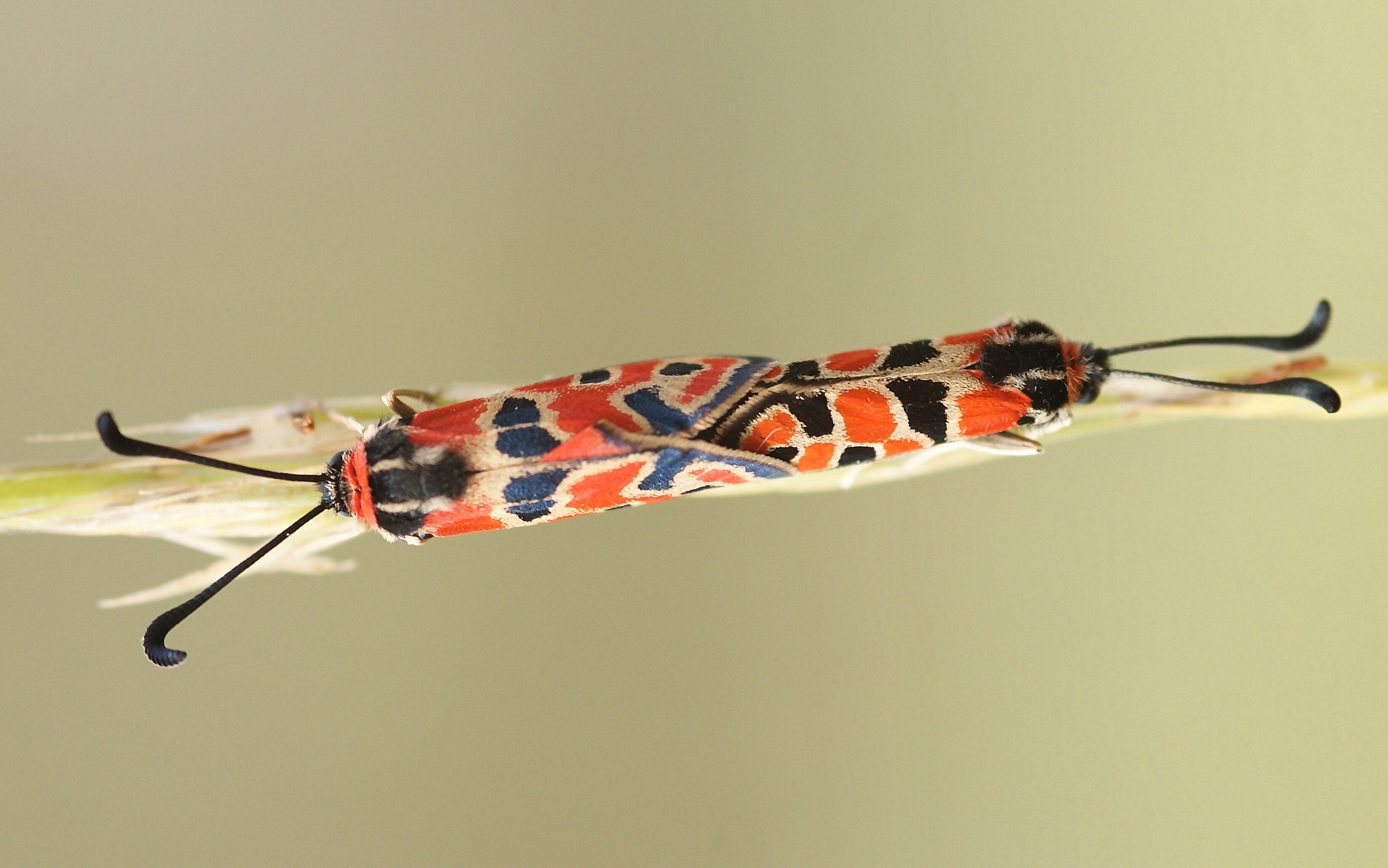
Mating pair of Zygaena fausta showing the tail-to-tail position and sexual dimorphism

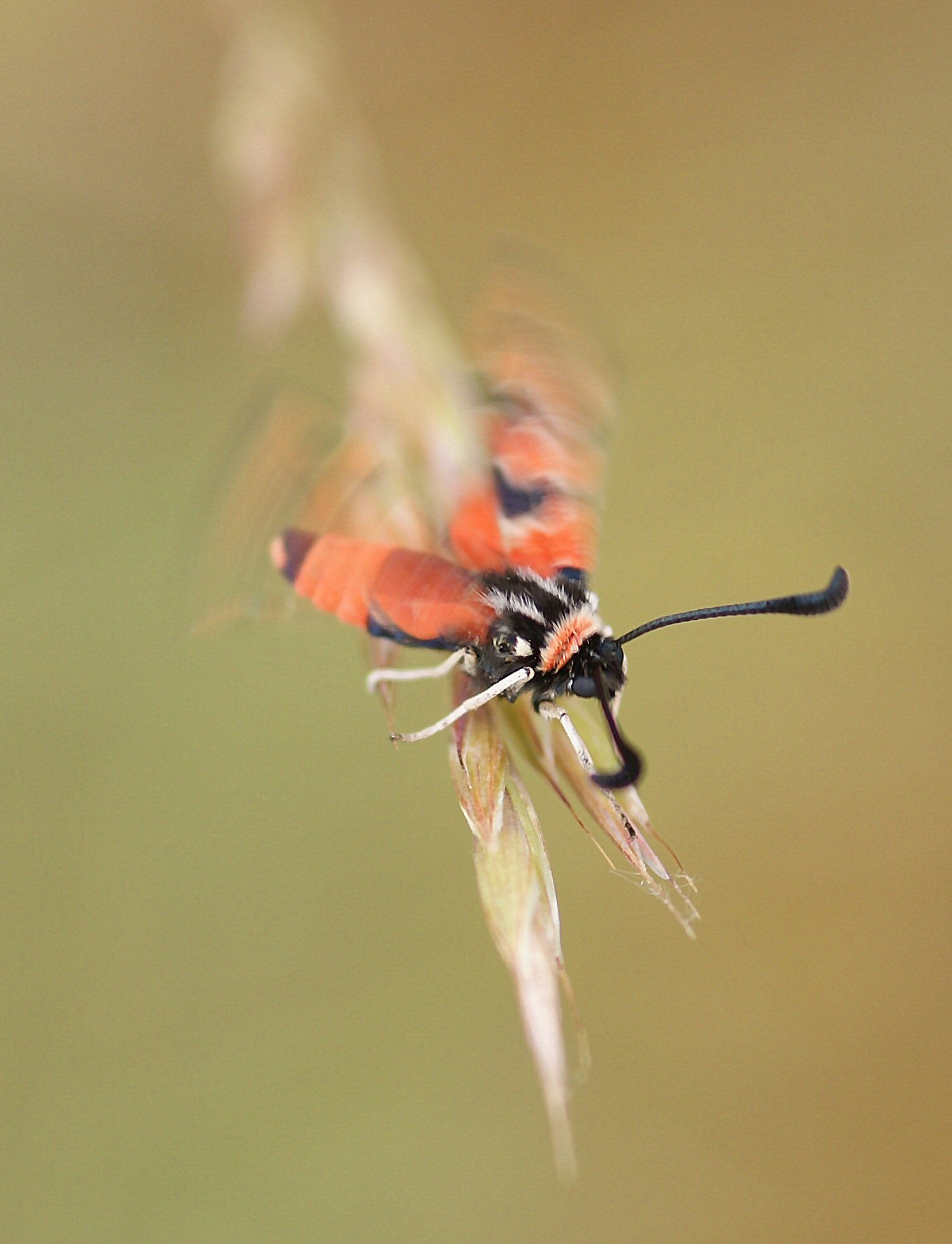
Zygaena fausta taking off, showing the bright red abdomen and eye spots on the thorax

Zygaena fausta is a member of the family Zygaenidae, the day-flying burnet moths. Its bright aposematic colours of red, white and black on the wings indicate to possible predators such as birds that it is foul tasting or poisonous. In flight, the bright red abdomen is revealed, contrasting with the white legs and black head and antennae; the thorax is black and white with an eye spot on each side (see image). There appears to be a considerable variation in pattern among specimens from different parts of Europe.

The southwest of Europe is home to Zygaena fausta. The moth can be found from Spain and Southern Portugal to Western Austria and Southern Germany, northeast to Thuringia, and southeast to North-western Italy.

It is rare or absent from Britain, the Netherlands and Belgium, where related species include the similarly aposematic five-spot burnet and the six-spot burnet.

The caterpillar (larva) is dark grey with a black line above a line of white interrupted by yellow bands. The caterpillar's food plants are vetches of the genus Coronilla.

The adults often visit a wide range of flowers including knapweed and eryngo. Typical habitat is dry chalk grassland. Adults fly throughout the summer from April or May until October. The sexes are similar but not identical (see image); mating takes place by day on isolated plants.

== Subspecies ==
- Zygaena fausta fausta
- Zygaena fausta agilis Reiss, 1932
- Zygaena fausta alpiummicans Verity, 1926
- Zygaena fausta baetica Rambur, 1839
- Zygaena fausta fassnidgei Tremewan & Manley, 1965
- Zygaena fausta faustina Ochsenheimer, 1808
- Zygaena fausta fernan Agenjo, 1948
- Zygaena fausta fina Burgeff, 1956
- Zygaena fausta fortunata Rambur, 1866
- Zygaena fausta gibraltarica Tremewan, 1961
- Zygaena fausta jucunda Meisner, 1818
- Zygaena fausta junceae Oberthur, 1884
- Zygaena fausta lacrymans Burgeff, 1914
- Zygaena fausta murciensis Reiss, 1922
- Zygaena fausta preciosa Reiss, 1920
- Zygaena fausta suevica Reiss, 1920
