= Neoprocris =

Scientific classification
- Kingdom: Animalia
- Phylum: Arthropoda
- Clade: Pancrustacea
- Class: Insecta
- Order: Lepidoptera
- Family: Zygaenidae
- Subfamily: Procridinae
- Genus: Neoprocris; Jordan, 1915

Genus of moths

Neoprocris is a genus of moths of the family Zygaenidae.

== Species ==
- Neoprocris saltuaria Jordan, 1915
- Neoprocris floridana Tarmann, 1984
