= Gonioprocris =

Scientific classification
- Domain: Eukaryota
- Kingdom: Animalia
- Phylum: Arthropoda
- Class: Insecta
- Order: Lepidoptera
- Family: Zygaenidae
- Subfamily: Procridinae
- Genus: Gonioprocris; Jordan, 1913

Species
- See text

Genus of moths

Gonioprocris is a genus of moths of the family Zygaenidae.

== Species ==
The genus includes the following species:

- Gonioprocris megalops (Druce, 1884)
- Gonioprocris xena Jordan, 1913
