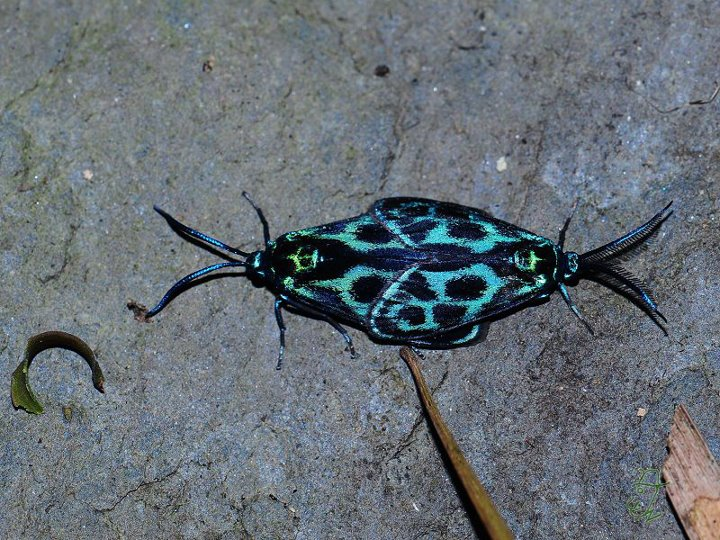
- Clelea formosana

Scientific classification
- Kingdom: Animalia
- Phylum: Arthropoda
- Class: Insecta
- Order: Lepidoptera
- Family: Zygaenidae
- Subfamily: Procridinae
- Genus: Clelea; Walker, 1854

Synonyms
- Clelia Walker, 1856

= Clelea =

Genus of moths

Clelea is a genus of moths of the family Zygaenidae.

== Selected species ==
- Clelea chala (Moore, 1859)
- Clelea formosana Strand, 1915
- Clelea pravata (Moore, 1859)
- Clelea sapphirina Walker, 1854, type species
- Clelea syriaca Hampson, 1919
