= Urodopsis =

Scientific classification
- Domain: Eukaryota
- Kingdom: Animalia
- Phylum: Arthropoda
- Class: Insecta
- Order: Lepidoptera
- Family: Zygaenidae
- Subfamily: Procridinae
- Genus: Urodopsis; Jordan, 1913

Genus of moths

Urodopsis is a genus of moths of the family Zygaenidae.

== Species ==
- Urodopsis subcaeruleus (Dognin, 1910)
- Urodopsis pusilla (Walker, 1854)
- Urodopsis dryas Jordan, 1915
