= Saliunca flavifrontis =

Scientific classification
- Kingdom: Animalia
- Phylum: Arthropoda
- Class: Insecta
- Order: Lepidoptera
- Family: Zygaenidae
- Genus: Saliunca
- Species: S. flavifrontis

Binomial name
- Saliunca flavifrontis Bryk

Synonyms
- Saliunca flavifrons Bethune-Baker, 1927 (preocc.)

Species of moth

Saliunca flavifrontis is a moth in the family Zygaenidae. It was originally described by George Thomas Bethune-Baker in 1927. It is found in Cameroon.

The wingspan is about 33 mm for males and 46 mm for females. The forewings are steel blue with just a tinge of green. There is an indefinite golden-bronze patch well beyond the cell in the radial area, looking purple in some lights. The hindwings are blackish, with the area below the cell and the basal part of the abdominal margin slightly hyaline.
