= Saliunca =

Scientific classification
- Kingdom: Animalia
- Phylum: Arthropoda
- Class: Insecta
- Order: Lepidoptera
- Family: Zygaenidae
- Subfamily: Procridinae
- Genus: Saliunca; Walker, 1865

Genus of moths

Saliunca is a genus of moths belonging to the family Zygaenidae.

The species of this genus are found in Africa.

== Species ==
- Saliunca aenescens Hampson, 1919
- Saliunca aitcha Ambille, 1892
- Saliunca analoga Alberti, 1957
- Saliunca anhyalina Alberti, 1957
- Saliunca aurifrons Walker, 1864
- Saliunca chalconota Hampson, 1919
- Saliunca cyanea Hampson, 1919
- Saliunca cyanothorax Hamspon, 1919
- Saliunca ealaensis Alberti, 1957
- Saliunca egeria Bethune-Baker, 1913
- Saliunca flavifrons Plötz, 1880
- Saliunca flavifrontis Bryk, 1936
- Saliunca fulviceps Hampson, 1919
- Saliunca ignicincta Joannis, 1912
- Saliunca kamilila Bethune-Baker, 1911
- Saliunca latipennis Strand, 1912
- Saliunca meruana Aurivillius, 1910
- Saliunca metacyanea Hampson, 1919
- Saliunca mimetica Jordan, 1907
- Saliunca nkolentangensis Strand, 1912
- Saliunca orphnina Hering, 1931
- Saliunca pallida Alberti, 1957
- Saliunca rubriventris Holland, 1920
- Saliunca rufidorsis Plötz, 1880
- Saliunca sapphirina Hampson, 1919
- Saliunca solora Plötz, 1880
- Saliunca styx Fabricius, 1775
- Saliunca tessmanni Alberti, 1957
- Saliunca thoracica Walker, 1856
- Saliunca triguttata Aurivillius, 1925
- Saliunca ugandana Jordan, 1908
- Saliunca ventralis Jordan, 1907
- Saliunca vidua Rebel, 1914
