= Phacusa birmana =

Scientific classification
- Kingdom: Animalia
- Phylum: Arthropoda
- Class: Insecta
- Order: Lepidoptera
- Family: Zygaenidae
- Genus: Phacusa
- Species: P. birmana

Binomial name
- Phacusa birmana (Oberthür, 1894)

Synonyms
- Northia birmana Oberthür, 1894

Species of moth

Phacusa birmana is a moth belonging to the Zygaenidae family. It was described by Oberthür in 1894. It is found in Myanmar.
