= Phacusa tenebrosa =

Scientific classification
- Kingdom: Animalia
- Phylum: Arthropoda
- Class: Insecta
- Order: Lepidoptera
- Family: Zygaenidae
- Genus: Phacusa
- Species: P. tenebrosa

Binomial name
- Phacusa tenebrosa (Walker, 1854)

Synonyms
- Glaucopis tenebrosa Walker, 1854; Phacusa tenebrosa siamensis Oberthür, 1894; Syntomis strigosa Walker, 1864

Species of moth

Phacusa tenebrosa is a moth of the family Zygaenidae. It was described by Francis Walker in 1854. It is found in Northern India.
