= Tascia virescens =

Scientific classification
- Domain: Eukaryota
- Kingdom: Animalia
- Phylum: Arthropoda
- Class: Insecta
- Order: Lepidoptera
- Family: Zygaenidae
- Genus: Tascia
- Species: T. virescens

Binomial name
- Tascia virescens Butler, 1876

Species of moth

Tascia virescens is a moth of the family Zygaenidae. It is known from South Africa.
