= Phacusa dolosa =

Scientific classification
- Kingdom: Animalia
- Phylum: Arthropoda
- Class: Insecta
- Order: Lepidoptera
- Family: Zygaenidae
- Genus: Phacusa
- Species: P. dolosa

Binomial name
- Phacusa dolosa Walker, 1856

Species of moth

Phacusa dolosa is a moth of the family Zygaenidae. It was described by Francis Walker in 1856. It is found in India and Myanmar.
