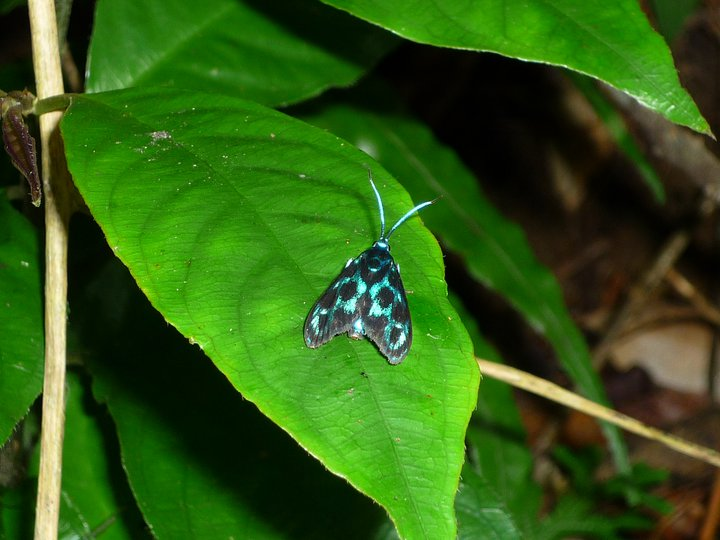

Scientific classification
- Domain: Eukaryota
- Kingdom: Animalia
- Phylum: Arthropoda
- Class: Insecta
- Order: Lepidoptera
- Family: Zygaenidae
- Genus: Clelea
- Species: C. formosana

Binomial name
- Clelea formosana Strand, 1915

= Clelea formosana =

Species of moth

Clelea formosana is a species of moth in the family Zygaenidae. It is found in Taiwan.

Adults have bright blue markings on the forewings. It is a day-flying species, with a wingspan under 50mm.
