= Tascia instructa =

Scientific classification
- Kingdom: Animalia
- Phylum: Arthropoda
- Class: Insecta
- Order: Lepidoptera
- Family: Zygaenidae
- Genus: Tascia
- Species: T. instructa

Binomial name
- Tascia instructa (Walker, 1854)

Synonyms
- Syntomis abdominalis Ehrmann, 1894; Naclia erythrogaster Mabille, 1892

Species of moth

Tascia instructa is a moth of the family Zygaenidae. It is known from the Democratic Republic of the Congo, Liberia and Sierra Leone.
