= Phacusa chalcobasis =

Scientific classification
- Kingdom: Animalia
- Phylum: Arthropoda
- Class: Insecta
- Order: Lepidoptera
- Family: Zygaenidae
- Genus: Phacusa
- Species: P. chalcobasis

Binomial name
- Phacusa chalcobasis Hampson, 1919

Species of moth

Phacusa chalcobasis is a moth of the family Zygaenidae. It was described by George Hampson in 1919. It is found on Sumatra in Indonesia.
