= Sthenoprocris =

Scientific classification
- Kingdom: Animalia
- Phylum: Arthropoda
- Class: Insecta
- Order: Lepidoptera
- Family: Zygaenidae
- Subfamily: Procridinae
- Genus: Sthenoprocris; Hampson, 1920

Type species
- Sthenoprocris malgassica Hampson, 1920

Genus of moths

Sthenoprocris is a genus of moths of the family Zygaenidae, containing only two species. It is known from Madagascar.

== Species ==
- Sthenoprocris brondeli Viette, 1978
- Sthenoprocris malgassica Hampson, 1920
