= Aethioprocris congoensis =

Scientific classification
- Kingdom: Animalia
- Phylum: Arthropoda
- Class: Insecta
- Order: Lepidoptera
- Family: Zygaenidae
- Genus: Aethioprocris
- Species: A. congoensis

Binomial name
- Aethioprocris congoensis Alberti, 1957

Species of moth

Aethioprocris congoensis is a moth of the family Zygaenidae. It is known from the Democratic Republic of the Congo.
