= Euclimaciopsis =

Scientific classification
- Kingdom: Animalia
- Phylum: Arthropoda
- Class: Insecta
- Order: Lepidoptera
- Family: Zygaenidae
- Subfamily: Procridinae
- Genus: Euclimaciopsis; Tremewan, 1973

Genus of moths

Euclimaciopsis is a genus of moths of the Zygaenidae family.

== Species ==
- Euclimaciopsis tortricalis (Druce, 1885)
