= Phacusa properta =

Scientific classification
- Domain: Eukaryota
- Kingdom: Animalia
- Phylum: Arthropoda
- Class: Insecta
- Order: Lepidoptera
- Family: Zygaenidae
- Genus: Phacusa
- Species: P. properta

Binomial name
- Phacusa properta (C. Swinhoe, 1890)

Synonyms
- Notioptera properta C. Swinhoe, 1890; Northia dohertyi Oberthür, 1894

Species of moth

Phacusa properta is a moth of the family Zygaenidae. It was described by Charles Swinhoe in 1890. It is found in Myanmar, northern India and the Nicobar Islands.
