= Phacusa subtilis =

Scientific classification
- Kingdom: Animalia
- Phylum: Arthropoda
- Clade: Pancrustacea
- Class: Insecta
- Order: Lepidoptera
- Family: Zygaenidae
- Genus: Phacusa
- Species: P. subtilis

Binomial name
- Phacusa subtilis Hering, 1925

Species of moth

Phacusa subtilis is a moth of the family Zygaenidae. It was described by Erich Martin Hering in 1925. It is found on the Indonesian islands of Java and Borneo.
