= Pseudoprocris =

Scientific classification
- Domain: Eukaryota
- Kingdom: Animalia
- Phylum: Arthropoda
- Class: Insecta
- Order: Lepidoptera
- Family: Zygaenidae
- Subfamily: Procridinae
- Genus: Pseudoprocris; H. Druce in Godman & Salvin, 1884

Genus of moths

Pseudoprocris is a genus of moths of the family Zygaenidae.

== Species ==
- Pseudoprocris dolosa H. Druce, 1884
- Pseudoprocris gracilis H. Druce, 1884
