= Sthenoprocris malgassica =

Scientific classification
- Kingdom: Animalia
- Phylum: Arthropoda
- Class: Insecta
- Order: Lepidoptera
- Family: Zygaenidae
- Genus: Sthenoprocris
- Species: S. malgassica

Binomial name
- Sthenoprocris malgassica Hampson, 1920

Species of moth

Sthenoprocris malgassica is a species of moth of the family Zygaenidae. It originates from Madagascar.

This species has a wingspan of 20 millimetres (0.79 in). It is black-brown with an orange-yellow band on the thorax just behind the head.
