= Tascia rhabdophora =

Scientific classification
- Kingdom: Animalia
- Phylum: Arthropoda
- Class: Insecta
- Order: Lepidoptera
- Family: Zygaenidae
- Genus: Tascia
- Species: T. rhabdophora

Binomial name
- Tascia rhabdophora Vári, 2002

Species of moth

Tascia rhabdophora is a moth of the family Zygaenidae. It is known from South Africa.
