= Aethioprocris togoensis =

Scientific classification
- Domain: Eukaryota
- Kingdom: Animalia
- Phylum: Arthropoda
- Class: Insecta
- Order: Lepidoptera
- Family: Zygaenidae
- Genus: Aethioprocris
- Species: A. togoensis

Binomial name
- Aethioprocris togoensis Alberti, 1954

Species of moth

Aethioprocris togoensis is a moth of the family Zygaenidae. It is known from the small African nation of Togo.
