= Phacusa discoidalis =

Scientific classification
- Domain: Eukaryota
- Kingdom: Animalia
- Phylum: Arthropoda
- Class: Insecta
- Order: Lepidoptera
- Family: Zygaenidae
- Genus: Phacusa
- Species: P. discoidalis

Binomial name
- Phacusa discoidalis (C. Swinhoe, 1903)

Synonyms
- Illiberis discoidalis C. Swinhoe, 1903

Species of moth

Phacusa discoidalis is a moth of the family Zygaenidae. It was described by Charles Swinhoe in 1903. It is found in northern Vietnam.
