= Alteramenelikia =

Scientific classification
- Kingdom: Animalia
- Phylum: Arthropoda
- Class: Insecta
- Order: Lepidoptera
- Family: Zygaenidae
- Subfamily: Procridinae
- Genus: Alteramenelikia; Alberti, 1971
- Species: A. jordani

Binomial name
- Alteramenelikia jordani (Alberti, 1954)

Synonyms
- Genus: Menelikia Alberti, 1954; Species; Menelikia jordani Alberti, 1954

Genus of moths

Alteramenelikia is a genus of moths of the family Zygaenidae, containing only one species, Alteramenelikia jordani. It is known from the Democratic Republic of the Congo and Ethiopia.
