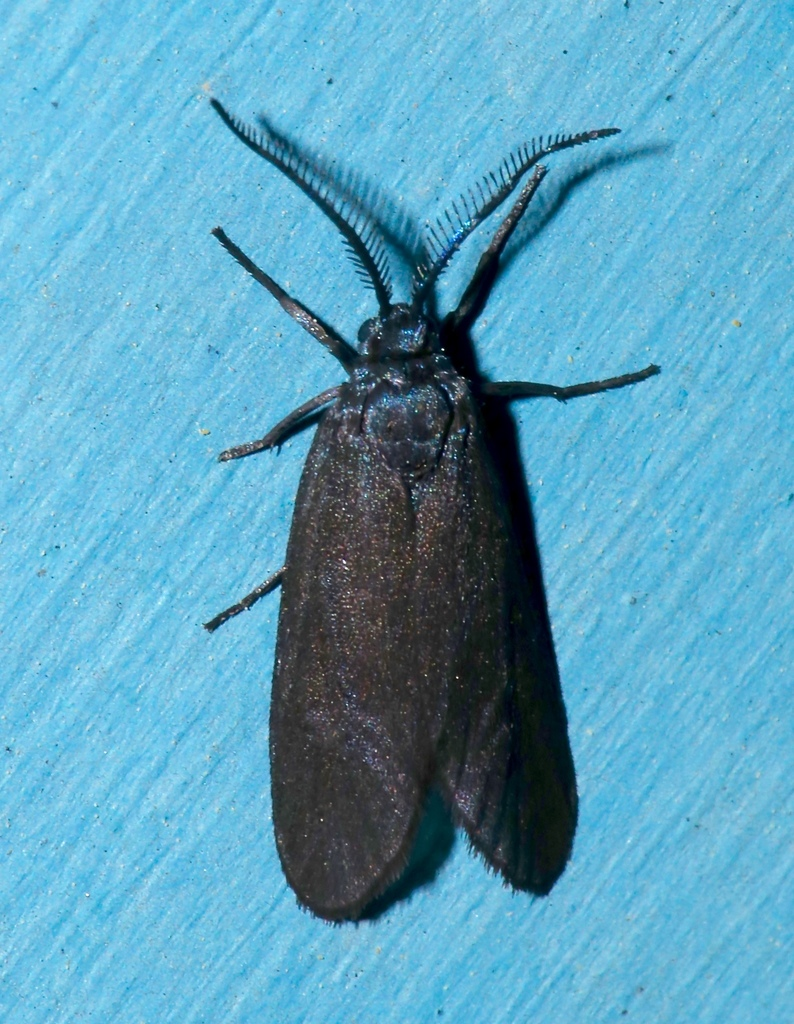

Scientific classification
- Kingdom: Animalia
- Phylum: Arthropoda
- Clade: Pancrustacea
- Class: Insecta
- Order: Lepidoptera
- Family: Zygaenidae
- Genus: Neoprocris
- Species: N. floridana

Binomial name
- Neoprocris floridana (Tarmann, 1984)

= Neoprocris floridana =

Species of moth

Neoprocris floridana, the laurelcherry smoky moth, is a species of moth belonging to the family Zygaenidae. It has been found in the southeastern United States, where all recordings have occurred in Florida with the exception of one in Lee County, Alabama and one in Aberdeen North Carolina. As its name suggests it is thought to feed primarily on laurelcherry trees (Prunus caroliniana). Because p. caroliniana is found throughout the southeast, it is reasonable to suspect these species migrate through and inhabit multiple, if not all, southeastern states.
