= Australartona =

Scientific classification
- Kingdom: Animalia
- Phylum: Arthropoda
- Clade: Pancrustacea
- Class: Insecta
- Order: Lepidoptera
- Family: Zygaenidae
- Subfamily: Procridinae
- Tribe: Artonini
- Genus: Australartona; Tarmann, 2005
- Species: A. mirabilis

Binomial name
- Australartona mirabilis Tarmann, 2005

Species of moth

Australartona mirabilis is a moth of the family Zygaenidae. It is the only species in the genus Australartona. It is found in Australia in southern temperate mountain rainforests in New South Wales and southern Queensland. The length of the forewings is 8–8.5 mm. It is a weak flyer. Adults are on the wing during the day. The larvae probably feed on Tetrarrhena juncea. Adults feed on flower nectar of Helichrysum species.
