= Aethioprocris =

Scientific classification
- Kingdom: Animalia
- Phylum: Arthropoda
- Class: Insecta
- Order: Lepidoptera
- Family: Zygaenidae
- Subfamily: Procridinae
- Genus: Aethioprocris; Alberti, 1954

Genus of moths

Aethioprocris is a genus of moths of the family Zygaenidae.

== Species ==
- Aethioprocris congoensis Alberti, 1957
- Aethioprocris togoensis Alberti, 1954
