= Phacusa manilensis =

Scientific classification
- Kingdom: Animalia
- Phylum: Arthropoda
- Class: Insecta
- Order: Lepidoptera
- Family: Zygaenidae
- Genus: Phacusa
- Species: P. manilensis

Binomial name
- Phacusa manilensis Hampson, 1919

Species of moth

Phacusa manilensis is a moth of the family Zygaenidae. It was described by George Hampson in 1919. It is found on Luzon in the Philippines.
