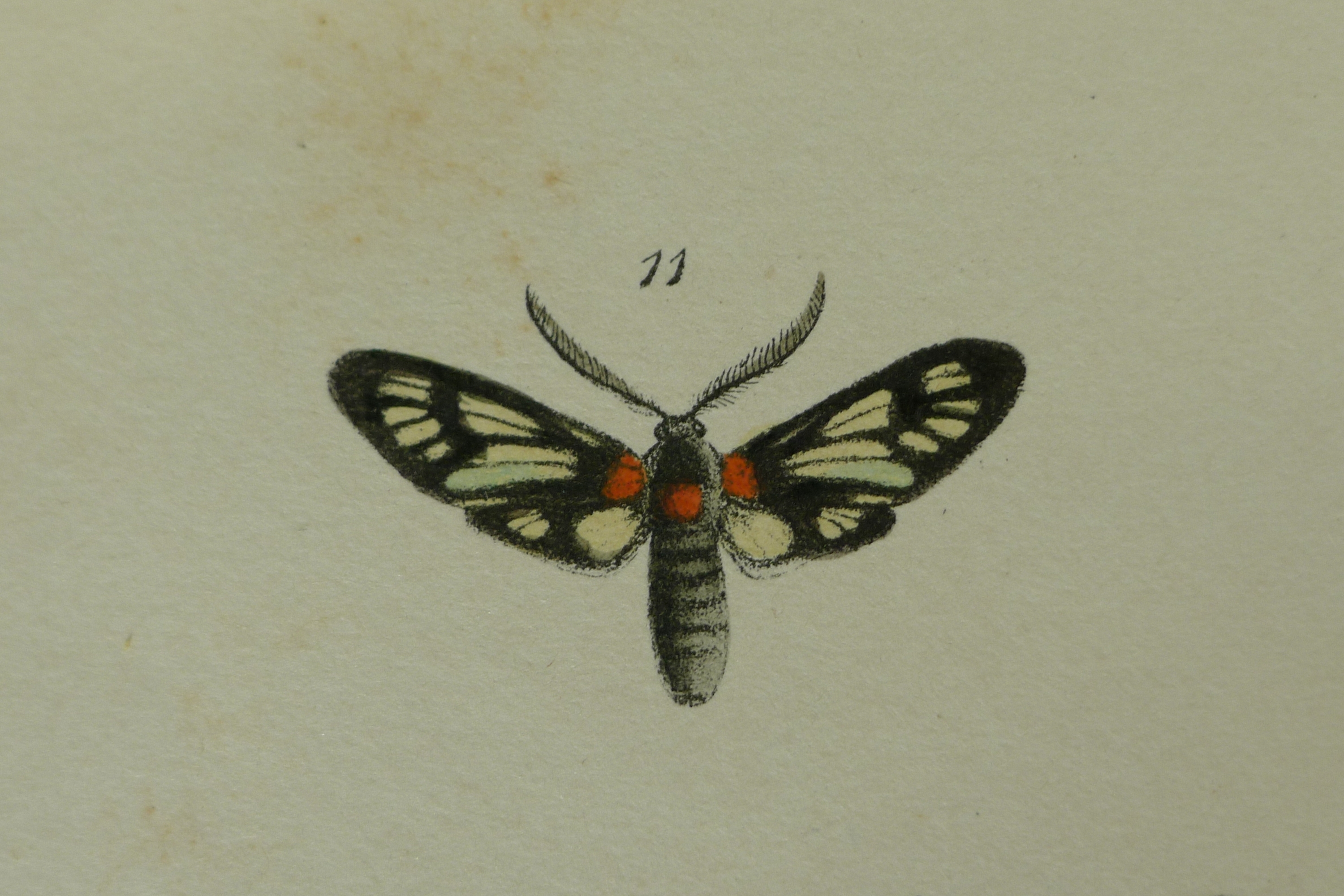

Scientific classification
- Domain: Eukaryota
- Kingdom: Animalia
- Phylum: Arthropoda
- Class: Insecta
- Order: Lepidoptera
- Family: Zygaenidae
- Genus: Phacusa
- Species: P. crawfurdi

Binomial name
- Phacusa crawfurdi (Moore, 1859)

Synonyms
- Syntomis crawfurdi Moore, 1859

= Phacusa crawfurdi =

Species of moth

Phacusa crawfurdi is a species of moth in the family Zygaenidae. It is found in south-east Asia, including India, Peninsular Malaysia, the Nicobar Islands, Indonesia (Java, Sumatra, Sulawesi, Ambon, Buru) and the Philippines.

The wingspan is 30 mm. Adults are bronzy black. There are a number of transparent windows in the wings.
