= Turneriprocris =

Scientific classification
- Kingdom: Animalia
- Phylum: Arthropoda
- Class: Insecta
- Order: Lepidoptera
- Family: Zygaenidae
- Subfamily: Procridinae
- Genus: Turneriprocris; Bryk, 1936
- Species: T. dolens

Binomial name
- Turneriprocris dolens (Walker, 1854)

Synonyms
- Genus: Neoprocris Turner, A.J. 1926; Species: Procris dolens Walker, 1854; Neoprocris dolens; Pollanisus dolens

Genus of moths

Turneriprocris is a genus of moths in the family Zygaenidae. It contains only one species, Turneriprocris dolens, which is found in the Australian Capital Territory, New South Wales, Queensland, South Australia, Tasmania and Victoria.

The length of the forewings is 5.5–6.5 mm for males.

The larvae feed on Leptospermum myrsinoides and Leptospermum juniperinum.
