= Ankasocris =

Scientific classification
- Kingdom: Animalia
- Phylum: Arthropoda
- Class: Insecta
- Order: Lepidoptera
- Family: Zygaenidae
- Subfamily: Procridinae
- Genus: Ankasocris; Viette, 1965
- Species: A. striatus

Binomial name
- Ankasocris striatus Viette, 1965

Genus of moths

Ankasocris is a genus of moths of the family Zygaenidae, containing only one species, Ankasocris striatus. It is known from Madagascar.
