= Tascia finalis =

Scientific classification
- Kingdom: Animalia
- Phylum: Arthropoda
- Class: Insecta
- Order: Lepidoptera
- Family: Zygaenidae
- Genus: Tascia
- Species: T. finalis

Binomial name
- Tascia finalis (Walker, 1854)

Synonyms
- Parasyntomis aethiops Distant, 1897; Tascia chrysotelus Walker, 1856

Species of moth

Tascia finalis is a moth of the family Zygaenidae. It is known from South Africa.
