= Phacusa khasiana =

Scientific classification
- Domain: Eukaryota
- Kingdom: Animalia
- Phylum: Arthropoda
- Class: Insecta
- Order: Lepidoptera
- Family: Zygaenidae
- Genus: Phacusa
- Species: P. khasiana

Binomial name
- Phacusa khasiana (Moore, 1879)

Synonyms
- Northia khasiana Moore, 1879

Species of insect

Phacusa khasiana is a moth of the family Zygaenidae. It was described by Frederic Moore in 1879. It is found in Assam, India.
