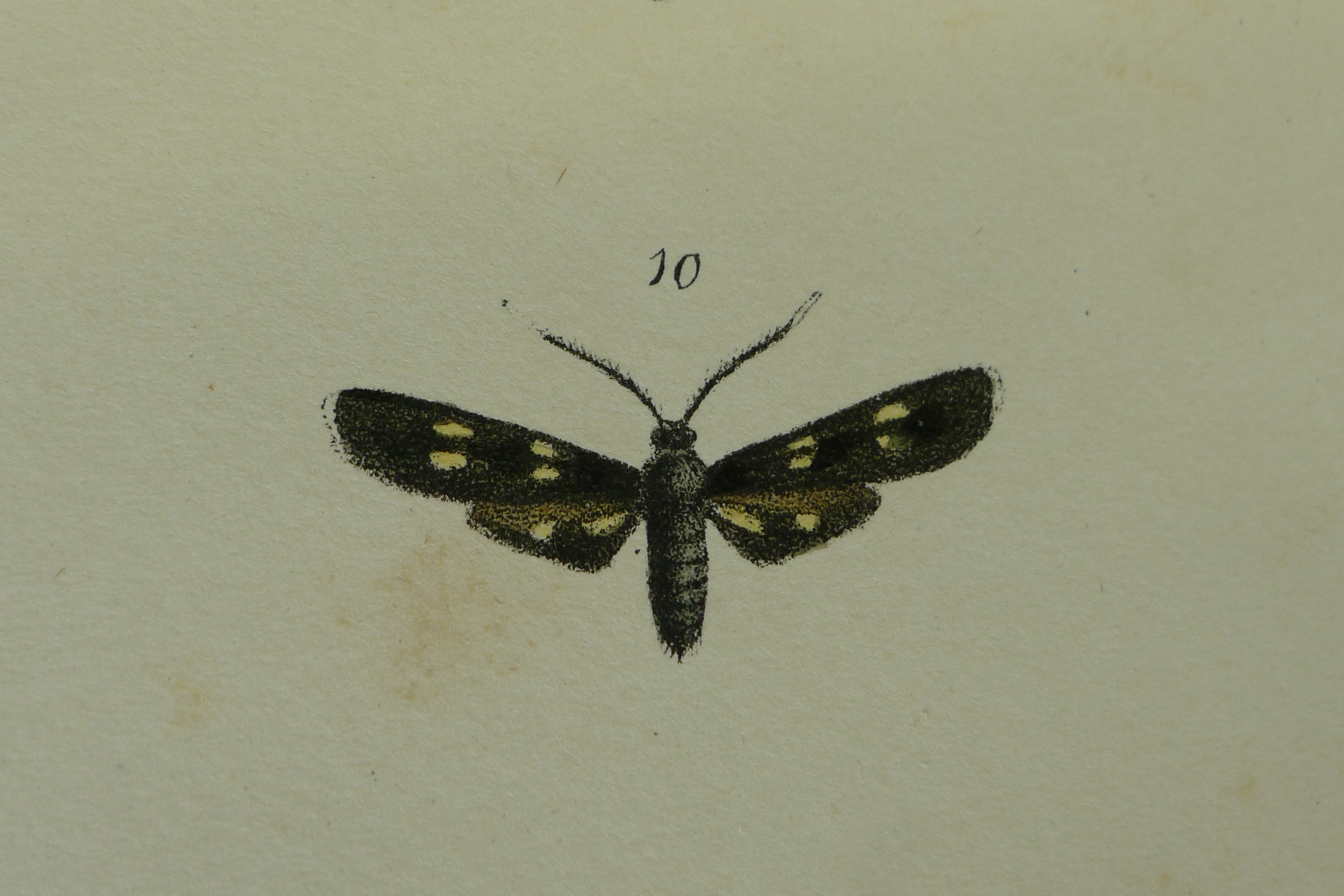

Scientific classification
- Domain: Eukaryota
- Kingdom: Animalia
- Phylum: Arthropoda
- Class: Insecta
- Order: Lepidoptera
- Family: Zygaenidae
- Genus: Clelea
- Species: C. pravata

Binomial name
- Clelea pravata (Moore, 1859)

Synonyms
- Syntomis pravata Moore, 1859

= Clelea pravata =

Species of moth

Clelea pravata is a species of moth in the family Zygaenidae. It is found on Java in Indonesia.
