= Phacusa inermis =

Scientific classification
- Domain: Eukaryota
- Kingdom: Animalia
- Phylum: Arthropoda
- Class: Insecta
- Order: Lepidoptera
- Family: Zygaenidae
- Genus: Phacusa
- Species: P. inermis

Binomial name
- Phacusa inermis (Alberti, 1954)

Synonyms
- Zama inermis Alberti, 1954

Species of moth

Phacusa inermis is a moth of the family Zygaenidae. It was described by Alberti in 1954. It is found in China.
