= Tascia =

Scientific classification
- Kingdom: Animalia
- Phylum: Arthropoda
- Class: Insecta
- Order: Lepidoptera
- Family: Zygaenidae
- Subfamily: Procridinae
- Genus: Tascia; Walker, 1856

Synonyms
- Parasyntomis Distant, 1897; Tassia Druce, 1910

Genus of insects

Tascia is a genus of moths of the family Zygaenidae.

== Species ==
- Tascia finalis (Walker, 1854)
- Tascia instructa (Walker, 1854)
- Tascia rhabdophora Vári, 2002
- Tascia virescens Butler, 1876
