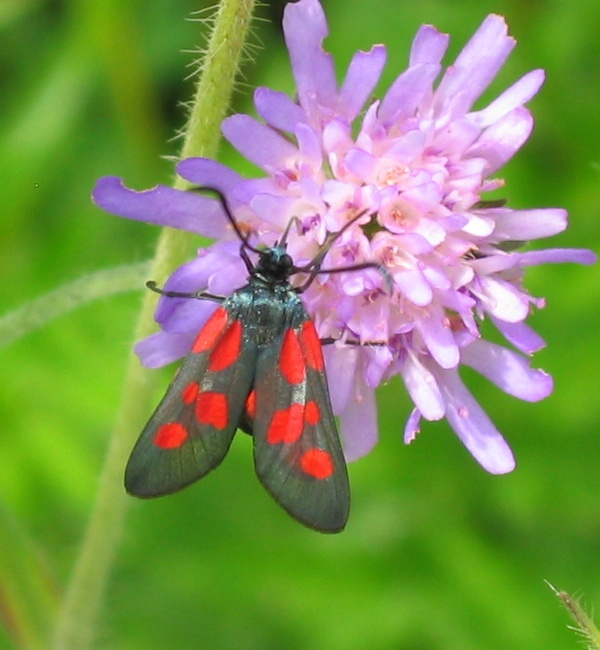

Scientific classification
- Domain: Eukaryota
- Kingdom: Animalia
- Phylum: Arthropoda
- Class: Insecta
- Order: Lepidoptera
- Family: Zygaenidae
- Genus: Zygaena
- Species: Z. viciae

Binomial name
- Zygaena viciae (Denis & Schiffermuller, 1775)

Synonyms
- Sphinx viciae Denis & Schiffermuller, 1775; Sphinx meliloti Esper, 1789

= Zygaena viciae =

New Forest burnet

Species of moth

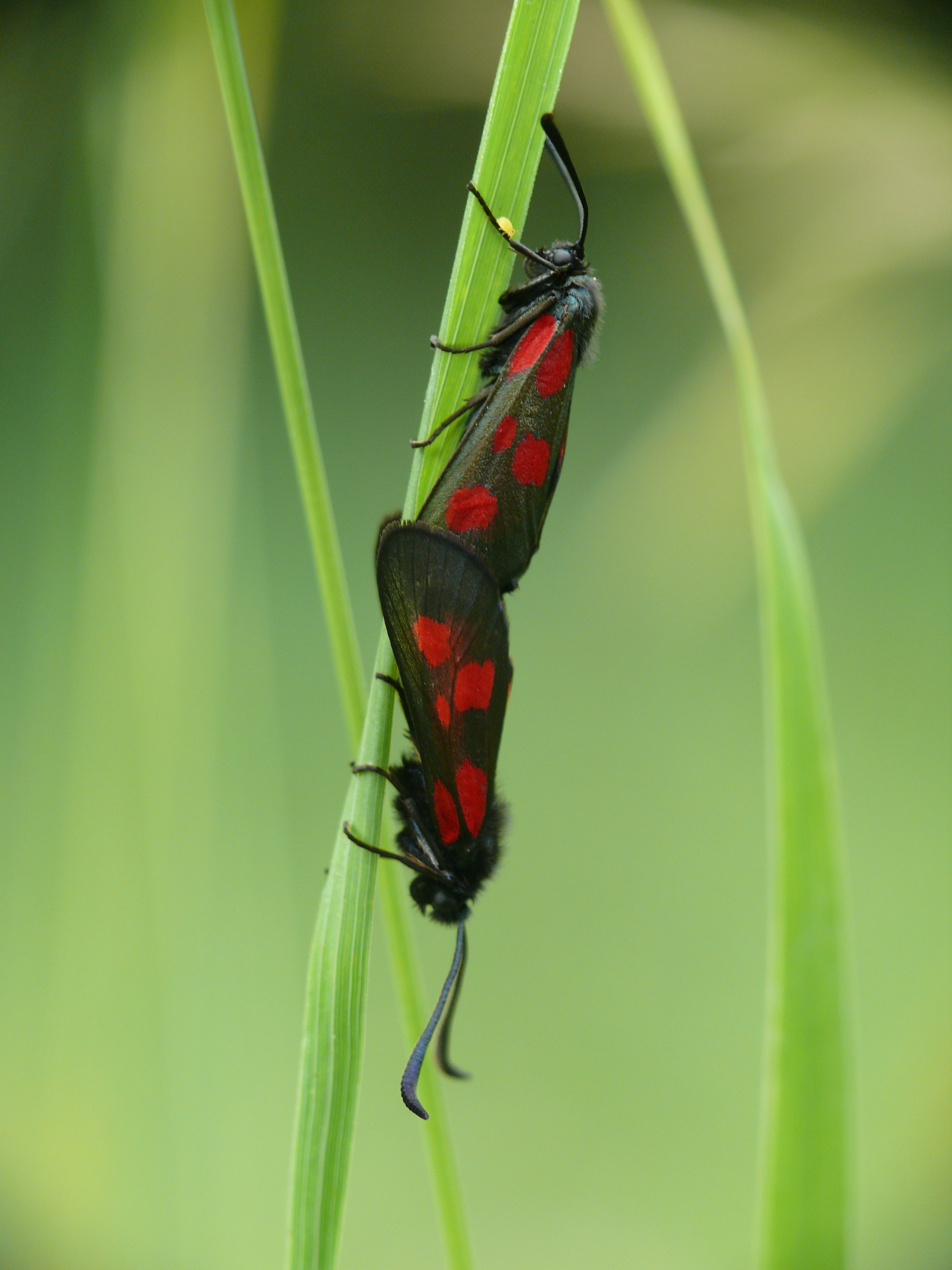
Mating, Germany

Zygaena viciae, the New Forest burnet moth, is a member of the Zygaenidae family, found in the northern hemisphere. Since 1927 it has been extinct in the New Forest, England, after which it is named. It is also known in Europe as the small five-spotted ram.

== Distribution and habitat ==
The moth is found in southern and central Europe, and in Scotland (Z. v. argylliensis), where it survives in very small numbers. It is also found in southern Scandinavia. In the east, the range extends to Lake Baikal.

== Life cycle and behaviour ==
Pale green/yellow eggs are laid in clusters. The larvae feed on the leaves of clover and vetch species. Their appearance varies with region, but they are generally green, with yellow and black spots. They pupate within a cocoon attached to foliage. The adults' wingspan is 22–32 mm, they fly by day, and they are on wing in July.

== Subspecies ==
- Zygaena viciae viciae
- Zygaena viciae argyllensis Tremewan, 1967
- Zygaena viciae bosniensis Reiss, 1922
- Zygaena viciae charon Hübner, 1796
- Zygaena viciae dacica Burgeff, 1914
- Zygaena viciae ehnbergii Reuter, 1893
- Zygaena viciae fernandezi Gomez Bustillo & Fernandez-Rubio, 1976
- Zygaena viciae hulda Reiss & Reiss, 1972
- Zygaena viciae italica Caradja, 1895
- Zygaena viciae nigrescens Reiss, 1921
- Zygaena viciae nobilis Navas, 1924
- Zygaena viciae rhaetica Burgeff, 1926
- Zygaena viciae sicula Calberla, 1895
- Zygaena viciae silbernageli Reiss, 1943
- Zygaena viciae silenus Burgeff, 1926
- Zygaena viciae stentzii Freyer, 1839
- Zygaena viciae subglocknerica Reiss, 1943
- Zygaena viciae ytenensis Briggs, 1888

== Bibliography ==
- Šašić, Martina; Nahirnić, Ana; Tarmann, Gerhard M. (2016-12-31). "Zygaenidae (Lepidoptera) in the Lepidoptera collections of the Croatian Natural History Museum". Natura Croatica: Periodicum Musei Historiae Naturalis Croatici. 25 (2): 233–248. doi:10.20302/NC.2016.25.19. eISSN 1848-7386.
