= Triprocris =

Scientific classification
- Kingdom: Animalia
- Phylum: Arthropoda
- Class: Insecta
- Order: Lepidoptera
- Family: Zygaenidae
- Subfamily: Procridinae
- Genus: Triprocris; Grote, 1873

Genus of moths

Triprocris is a genus of moths of the family Zygaenidae.

== Species ==
- Triprocris smithsoniana (Clemens, 1860)
- Triprocris yampai Barnes, 1905
