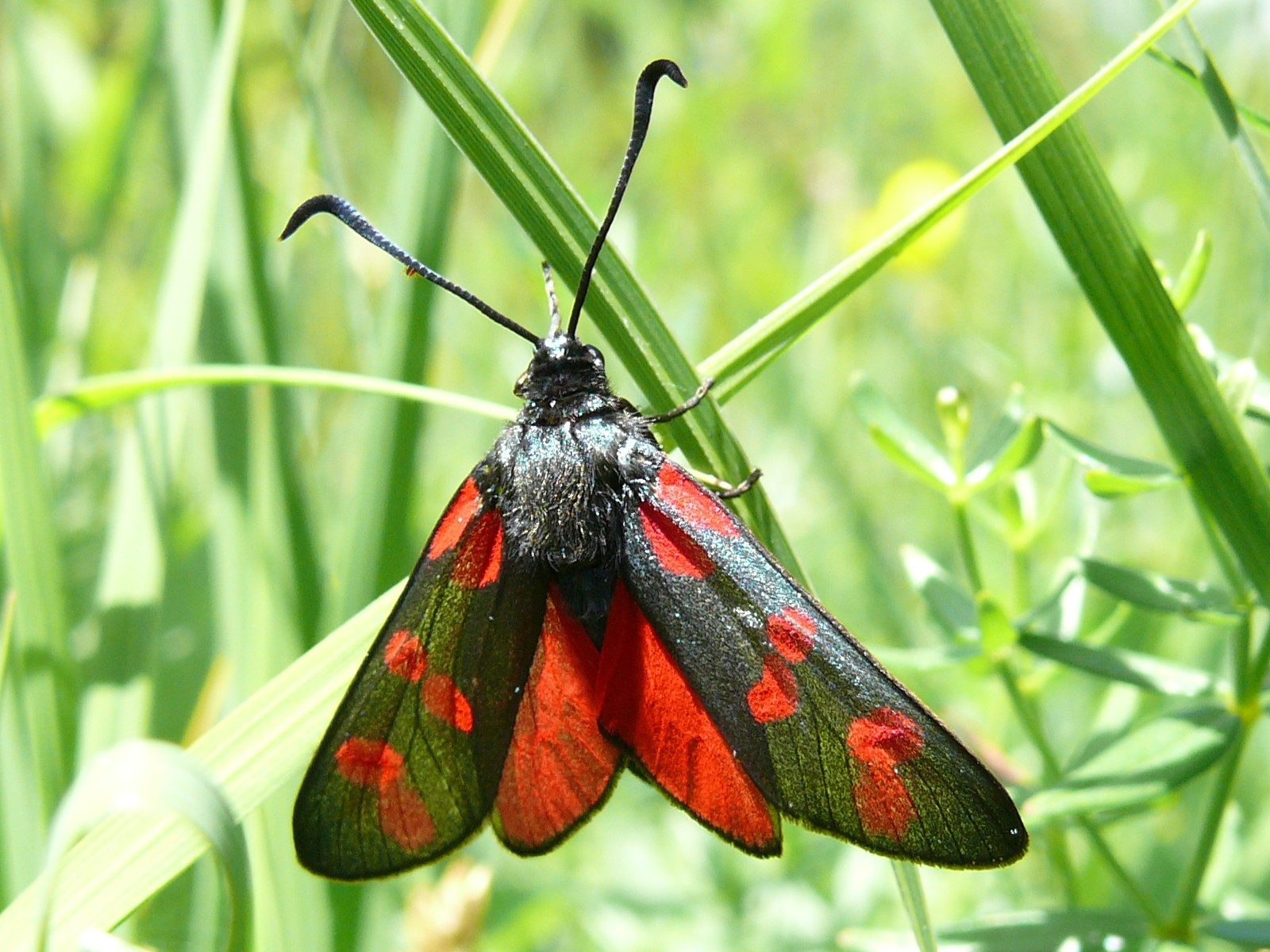

Scientific classification
- Kingdom: Animalia
- Phylum: Arthropoda
- Clade: Pancrustacea
- Class: Insecta
- Order: Lepidoptera
- Family: Zygaenidae
- Genus: Zygaena
- Species: Z. filipendulae

Binomial name
- Zygaena filipendulae (Linnaeus, 1758)

Synonyms
- Sphinx filipendulae Linnaeus, 1758; Sphinx maior Esper, 1794; Sphinx polygalae Esper, 1783; Sphinx stoechadis Borkhausen, 1793

= Six-spot burnet =

Six-spot burnet moth

Species of moth

The six-spot burnet (Zygaena filipendulae) is a day-flying moth of the family Zygaenidae.

== Description ==
Zygaena filipendulae has a wingspan of 30–40 mm (1.2–1.6 in). The sexes are similar. The fore wings are dark metallic green with six vivid red spots (sometimes the spots are merged causing possible confusion with other species such as the five-spot burnet. Occasionally, the spots are yellow or even black. The hind wings are red with a blackish fringe. The larva is plump and hairy with variable markings, usually pale green with rows of black spots.

It is an aposematic moth, being distinguished by its colors as toxic to predators like birds and lizards. If attacked it emits a liquid containing cyanide, which is present in all stages of the life cycle.

Top view

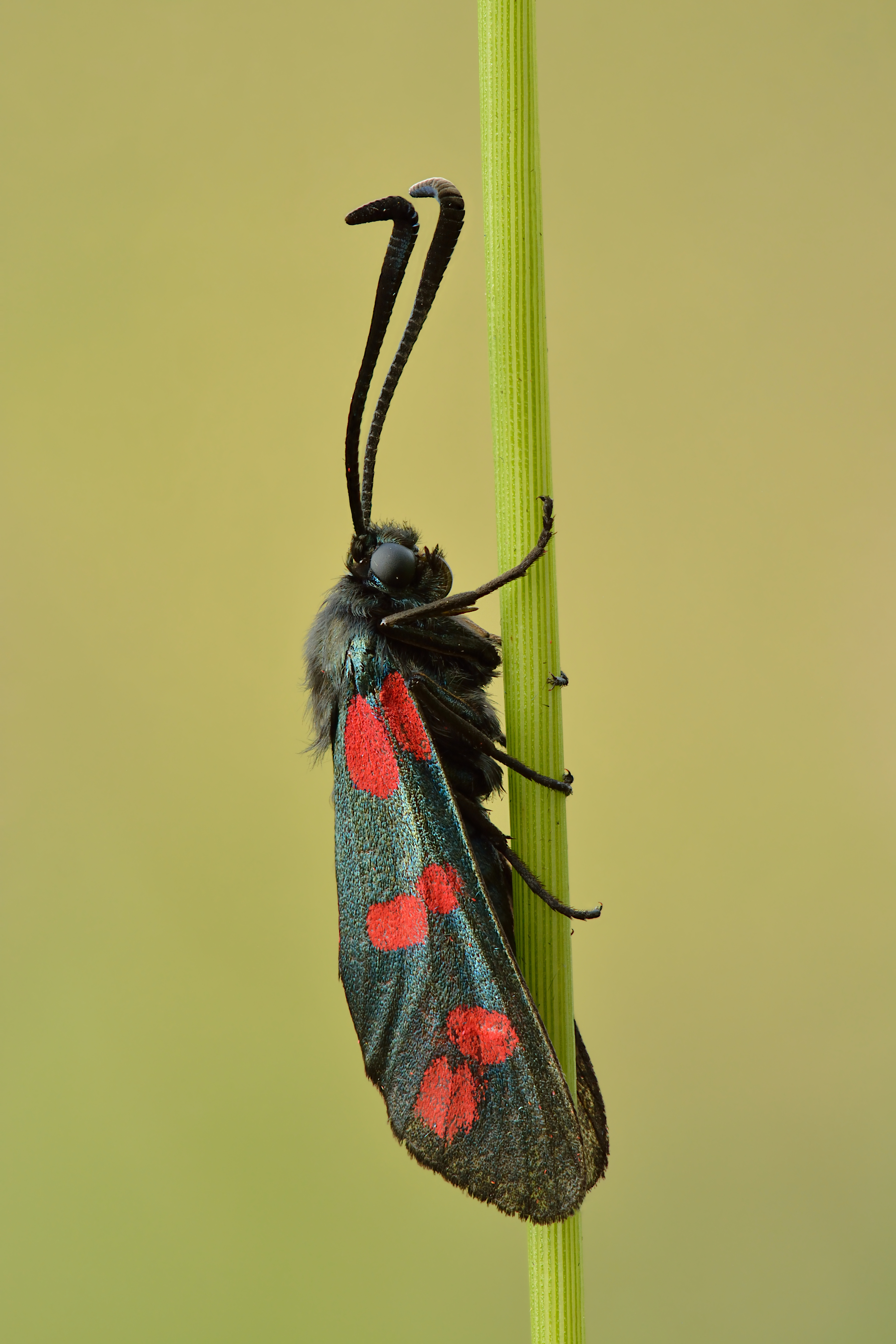
Side view

Collecting nectar from a flower

== Distribution and habitat ==
Zygaena filipendulae is a common species throughout Europe, except the Atlantic coast of the Iberian Peninsula, northern Scandinavia and the Great Russian North. It is also present in Asia, from Anatolia through the Caucasus to Syria and Lebanon. This species can be found in meadows, woodland clearings, sea-cliffs and areas rich in grasses and flowers, up to 2,000 metres (6,600 ft) in altitude.

== Lifecycle ==
The adults fly on hot, sunny days from June to August, (Note: The flight season refers to the British Isles. This may vary in other parts of the range.) and are attracted to a wide variety of flowers such as knapweed and scabious, as well as the larval food plants bird's foot trefoil, Coronilla and clover.

The species overwinters as a larva. The larva pupates in early summer in a papery cocoon attached to a grass stem.

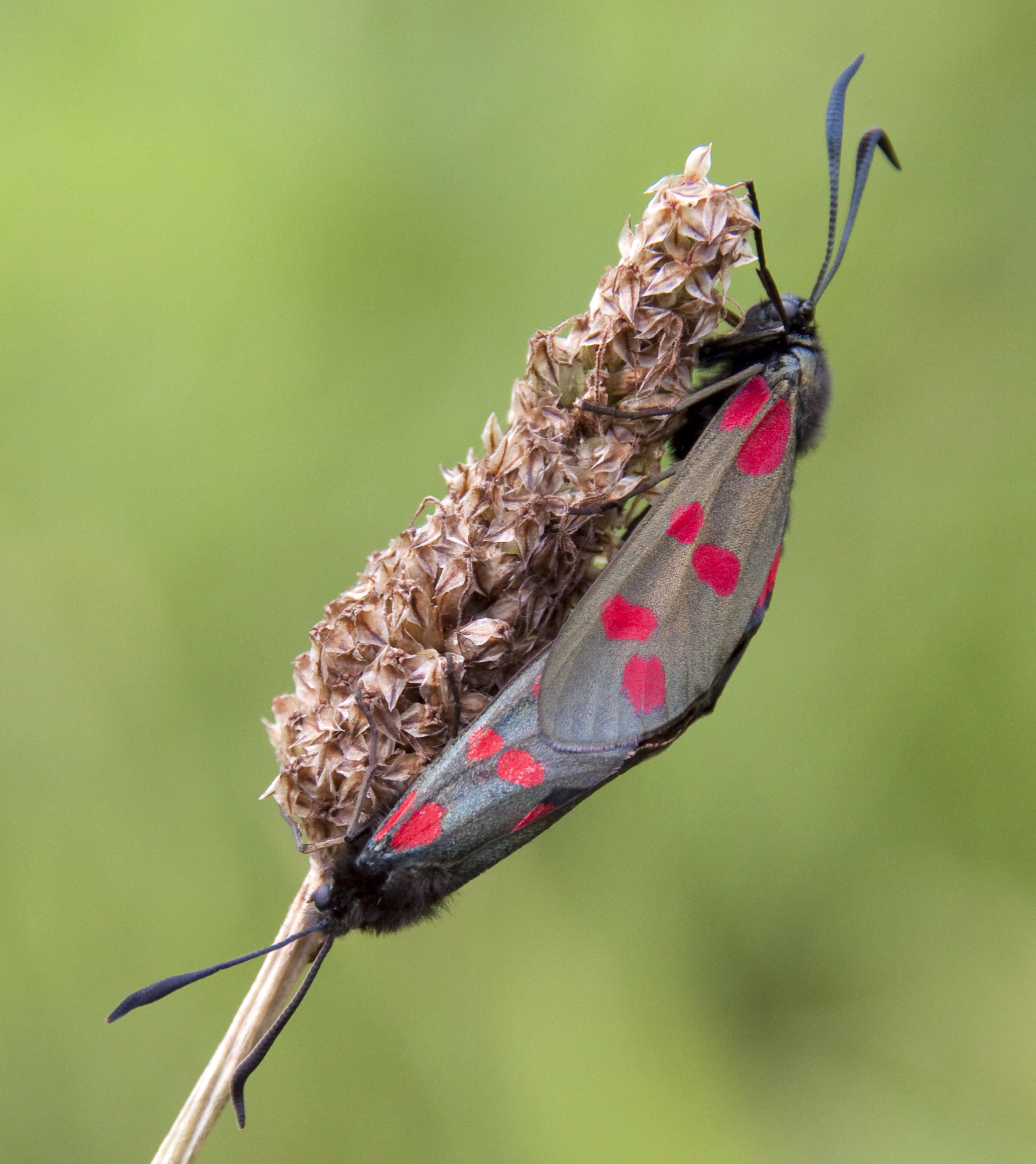
Mating

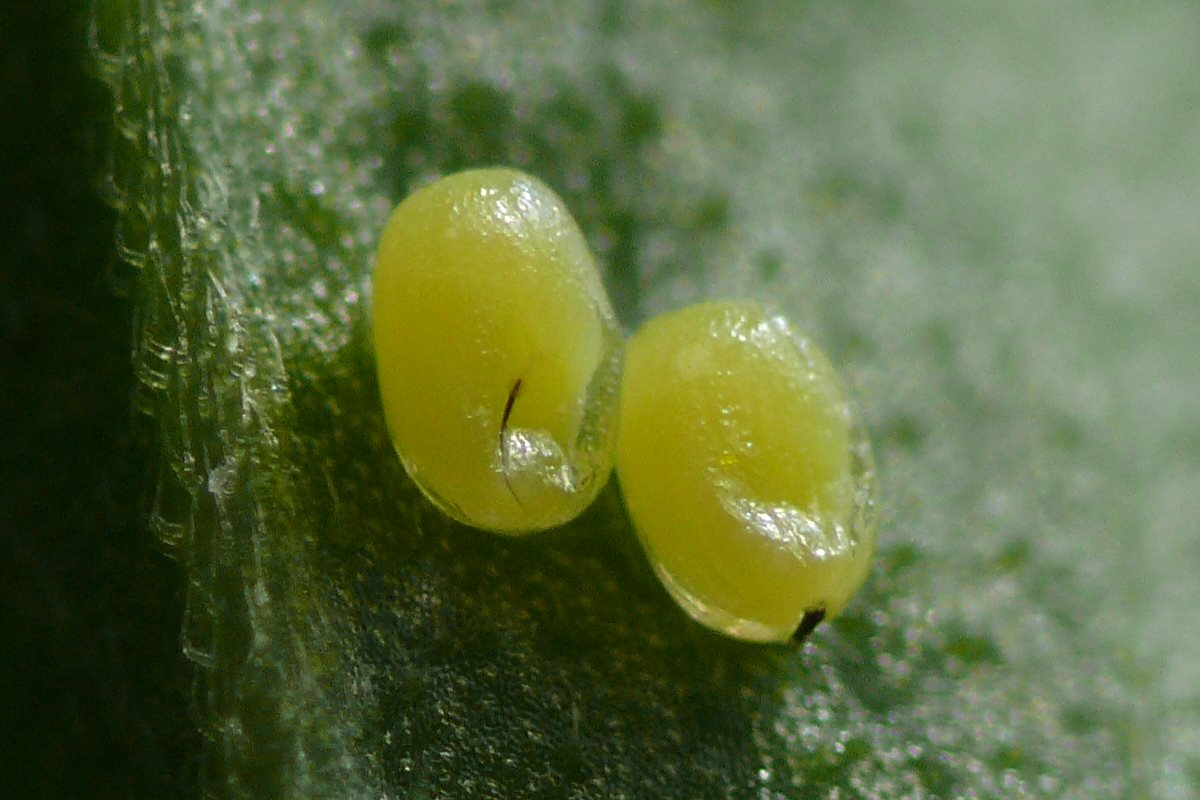
Eggs

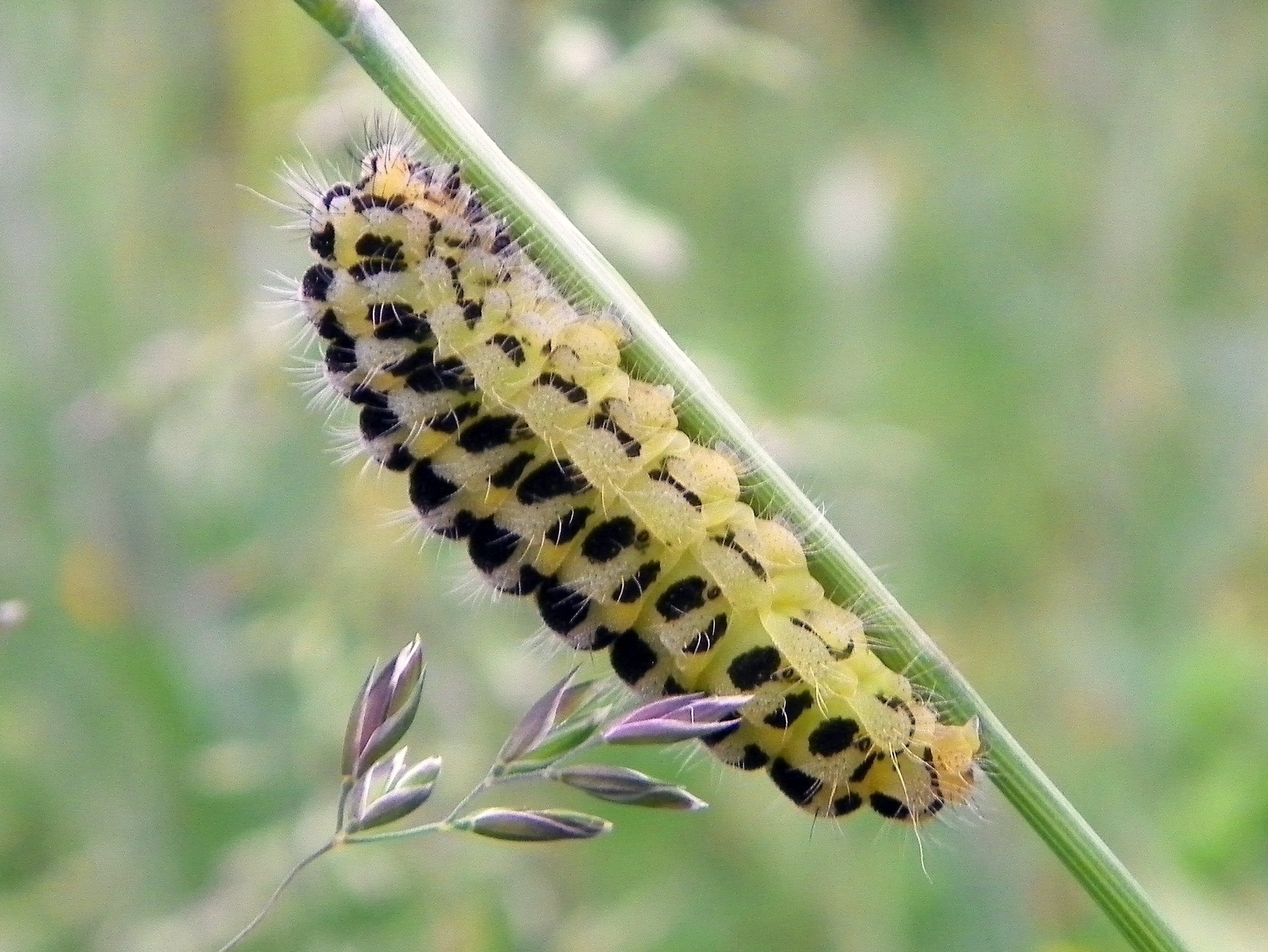
Caterpillar

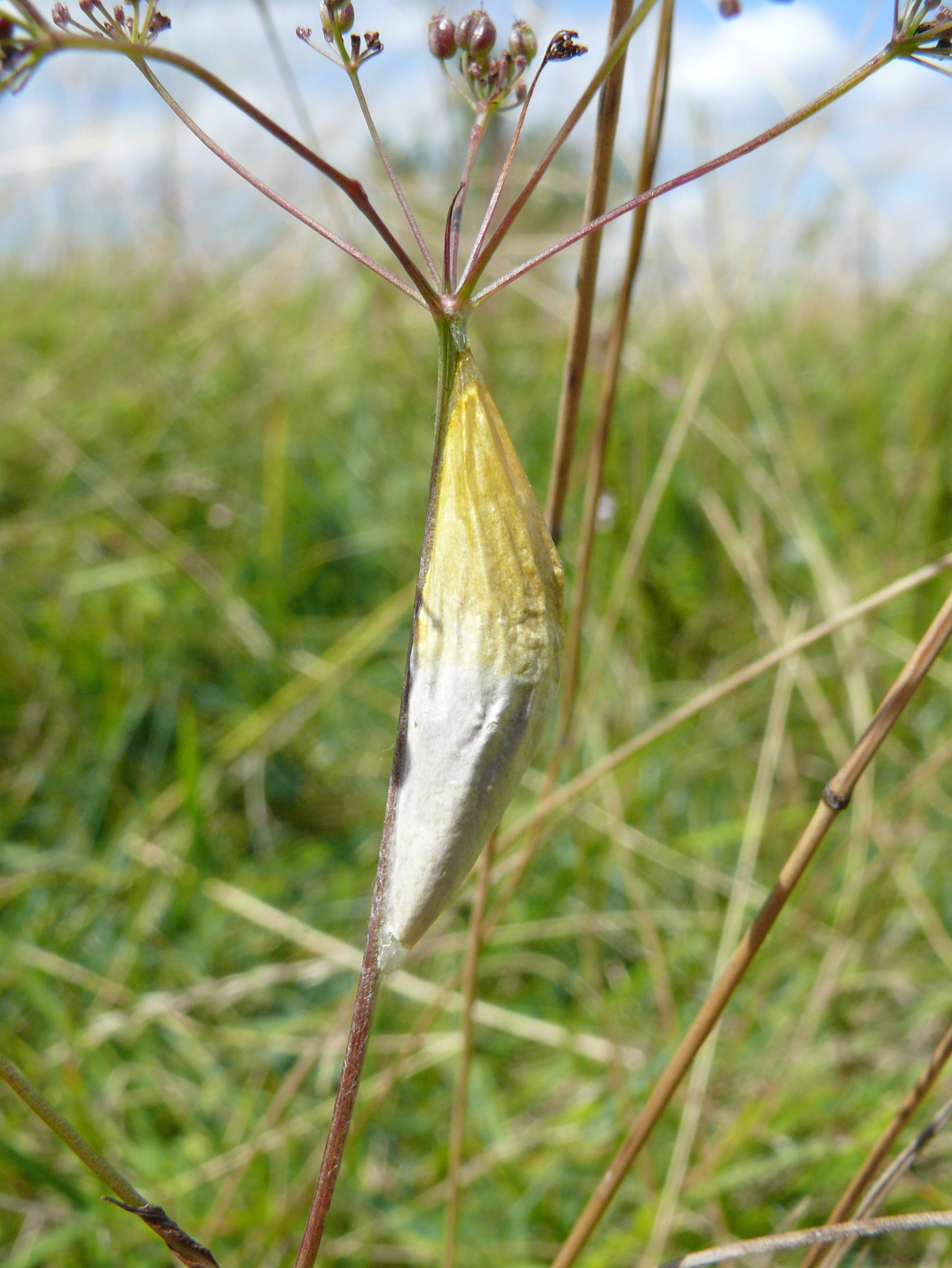
Cocoon

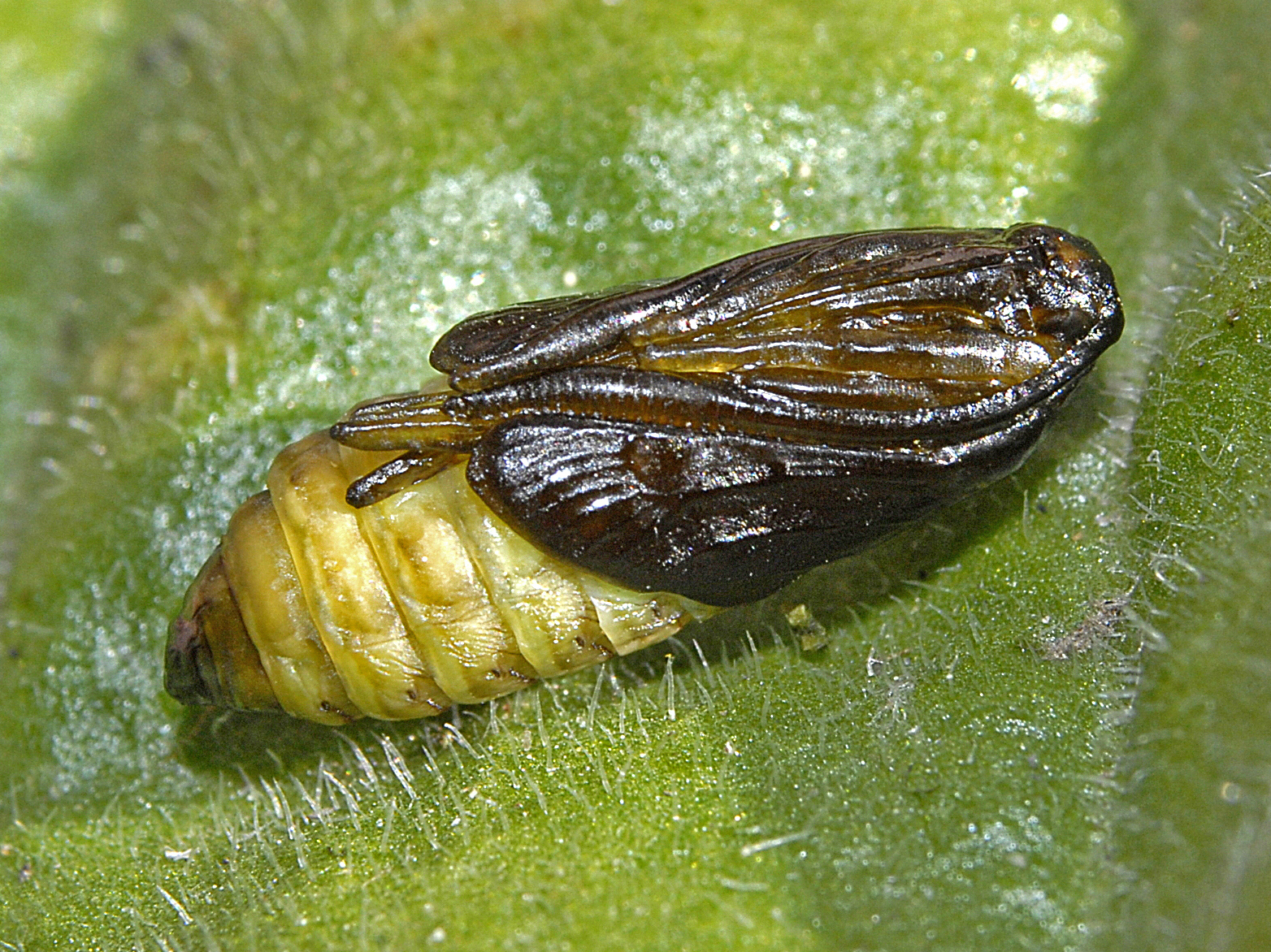
Pupa (cocoon removed)

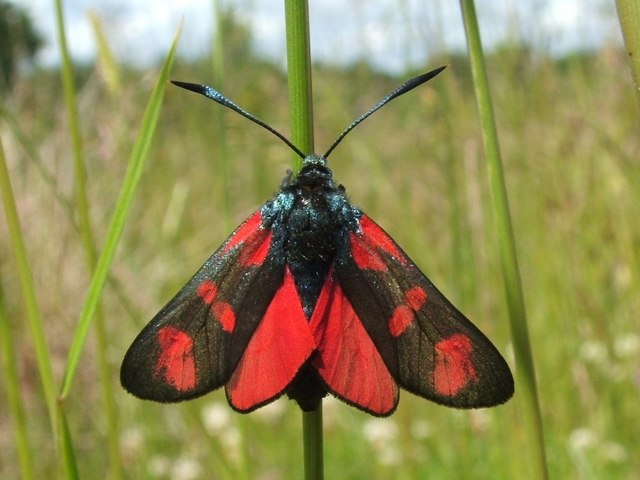
Adult

== Subspecies ==
- Z. f. altapyrenaica Le Charles, 1950
- Z. f. arctica Schneider, 1880
- Z. f. balcanirosea Holik, 1943
- Z. f. campaniae Rebel, 1901
- Z. f. duponcheli Verity, 1921
- Z. f. filipendulae
- Z. f. gemella Marten, 1956
- Z. f. gemina Burgeff, 1914
- Z. f. gigantea Rocci, 1913
- Z. f. himmighofeni Burgeff, 1926
- Z. f. liguris Rocci, 1925
- Z. f. maior Esper, 1794
- Z. f. mannii Herrich-Schaffer, 1852
- Z. f. noacki Reiss, 1962
- Z. f. oberthueriana Burgeff, 1926
- Z. f. polygalae (Esper, 1783)
- Z. f. praeochsenheimeri Verity, 1939
- Z. f. pulcherrima Verity, 1921
- Z. f. pulcherrimastoechadis Verity, 1921
- Z. f. pyrenes Verity, 1921
- Z. f. seeboldi Oberthur, 1910
- Z. f. siciliensis Verity, 1917
- Z. f. stephensi Dupont, 1900
- Z. f. stoechadis (Borkhausen, 1793)
- Z. f. zarana Burgeff, 1926

== Bibliography ==
- C. M. Naumann, G. M. Tarmann, W. G. Tremewan: The Western Palaearctic Zygaenidae. Apollo Books, Stenstrup, 1999, ISBN 87-88757-15-3
- Capinera, J. L. (Ed.), Encyclopedia of Entomology, 4 voll., 2nd Ed., Dordrecht, Springer Science+Business Media B.V., 2008, pp. lxiii + 4346, ISBN 978-1-4020-6242-1
- Chinery, Michael. Collins Guide to the Insects of Britain and Western Europe 1986. (reprinted 1991).
- Kükenthal, W. (Ed.), Handbuch der Zoologie / Handbook of Zoology, Band 4: Arthropoda - 2. Hälfte: Insecta - Lepidoptera, moths and butterflies, in Kristensen, N. P., Handbuch der Zoologie, Fischer, M. (Scientific Editor), Teilband/Part 35: Vol. 1: Evolution, systematics, and biogeography, Berlino, New York, Walter de Gruyter, 1999 [1998], pp. x + 491, ISBN 978-3-11-015704-8
- Scoble, M. J., The Lepidoptera: Form, Function and Diversity, seconda edizione, London, Oxford University Press & Natural History Museum, 2011 [1992], pp. xi, 404, ISBN 978-0-19-854952-9
- Skinner, Bernard.Colour Identification Guide to Moths of the British Isles 1984.
- Stehr, F. W. (Ed.), Immature Insects, 2 volumi, seconda edizione, Dubuque, Iowa, Kendall/Hunt Pub. Co., 1991 [1987], pp. ix, 754, ISBN 978-0-8403-3702-3
- Šašić, Martina; Nahirnić, Ana; Tarmann, Gerhard M. (2016-12-31). "Zygaenidae (Lepidoptera) in the Lepidoptera collections of the Croatian Natural History Museum". Natura Croatica: Periodicum Musei Historiae Naturalis Croatici. 25 (2): 233–248. doi:10.20302/NC.2016.25.19. eISSN 1848-7386.
