= Tetraclonia =

Scientific classification
- Domain: Eukaryota
- Kingdom: Animalia
- Phylum: Arthropoda
- Class: Insecta
- Order: Lepidoptera
- Family: Zygaenidae
- Subfamily: Procridinae
- Genus: Tetraclonia; Jordan, 1913

Genus of moths

Tetraclonia is a genus of moths of the family Zygaenidae.

== Species ==
- Tetraclonia cinniana (Druce, 1884)
- Tetraclonia dyaria Jordan, 1913
- Tetraclonia forreri (Druce, 1884)
- Tetraclonia latercula (H. Edwards, 1882)
- Tetraclonia saucia Jordan, 1913
