= Palmartona =

Scientific classification
- Kingdom: Animalia
- Phylum: Arthropoda
- Clade: Pancrustacea
- Class: Insecta
- Order: Lepidoptera
- Family: Zygaenidae
- Subfamily: Procridinae
- Genus: Palmartona; Tarmann, 2005
- Species: P. catoxantha

Binomial name
- Palmartona catoxantha (Hampson, 1892)

Synonyms
- Brachartona catoxantha Hampson, 1892; Artona catoxantha; Zeuxippa catoxantha

Genus of moths

Palmartona is a genus of moths in the family Zygaenidae. It contains only one species, Palmartona catoxantha, which is found from Myanmar eastwards throughout Malaysia, Singapore, Indonesia (Sumatra, Nias, Java, Bangka, Kalimantan, Sulawesi), the Philippines (Palawan) to Papua New Guinea. There is one record for Australia (Queensland).
