= Seryda =

Scientific classification
- Kingdom: Animalia
- Phylum: Arthropoda
- Class: Insecta
- Order: Lepidoptera
- Family: Zygaenidae
- Subfamily: Procridinae
- Genus: Seryda; Walker, 1856

Genus of moths

Seryda is a genus of moths of the family Zygaenidae.

== Species ==
- Seryda anacreon (Druce, 1884)
- Seryda basirei (Druce, 1896)
- Seryda cincta Walker, 1856
- Seryda confusa Tarmann & Drouet, 2015
- Seryda constans (H. Edwards, 1881)
- Seryda gallardi Tarmann & Drouet, 2015
- Seryda thyana (Druce, 1884)
