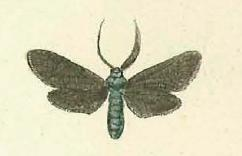

Scientific classification
- Domain: Eukaryota
- Kingdom: Animalia
- Phylum: Arthropoda
- Class: Insecta
- Order: Lepidoptera
- Family: Zygaenidae
- Subfamily: Procridinae
- Genus: Theresimima; Strand, 1917
- Species: T. ampellophaga

Binomial name
- Theresimima ampellophaga (Bayle-Barelle, 1808)

Synonyms
- Zygaena ampellophaga Bayle-Barelle, 1808; Ino ampellophaga

= Theresimima =

Genus of moths

Theresimima is a genus of moths. T. ampellophaga, the vine bud moth, is a moth of the family Zygaenidae. It is found from Algeria, Spain and southern France through most of southern Europe to the northern coast of the Black Sea. In the north, it ranges up to Hungary and Slovakia and in the east, the range extends to the southern part of European Russia, the western Caucasus and Transcaucasia, through Turkey, Lebanon and Syria to Israel.

The length of the forewings is 8.5–12 mm for males and 7.5–11.5 mm for females.

The larvae feed the leaves of Vitis vinifera, Parthenocissus vitacea and Parthenocissus quinquefolia. They have been considered an important pest for wine production since Roman times.

== Bibliography ==
- C. M. Naumann, W. G. Tremewan: The Western Palaearctic Zygaenidae. Apollo Books, Stenstrup 1999, ISBN 87-88757-15-3
- Šašić, Martina; Nahirnić, Ana; Tarmann, Gerhard M. (2016-12-31). "Zygaenidae (Lepidoptera) in the Lepidoptera collections of the Croatian Natural History Museum". Natura Croatica: Periodicum Musei Historiae Naturalis Croatici. 25 (2): 233–248. doi:10.20302/NC.2016.25.19. eISSN 1848-7386.
