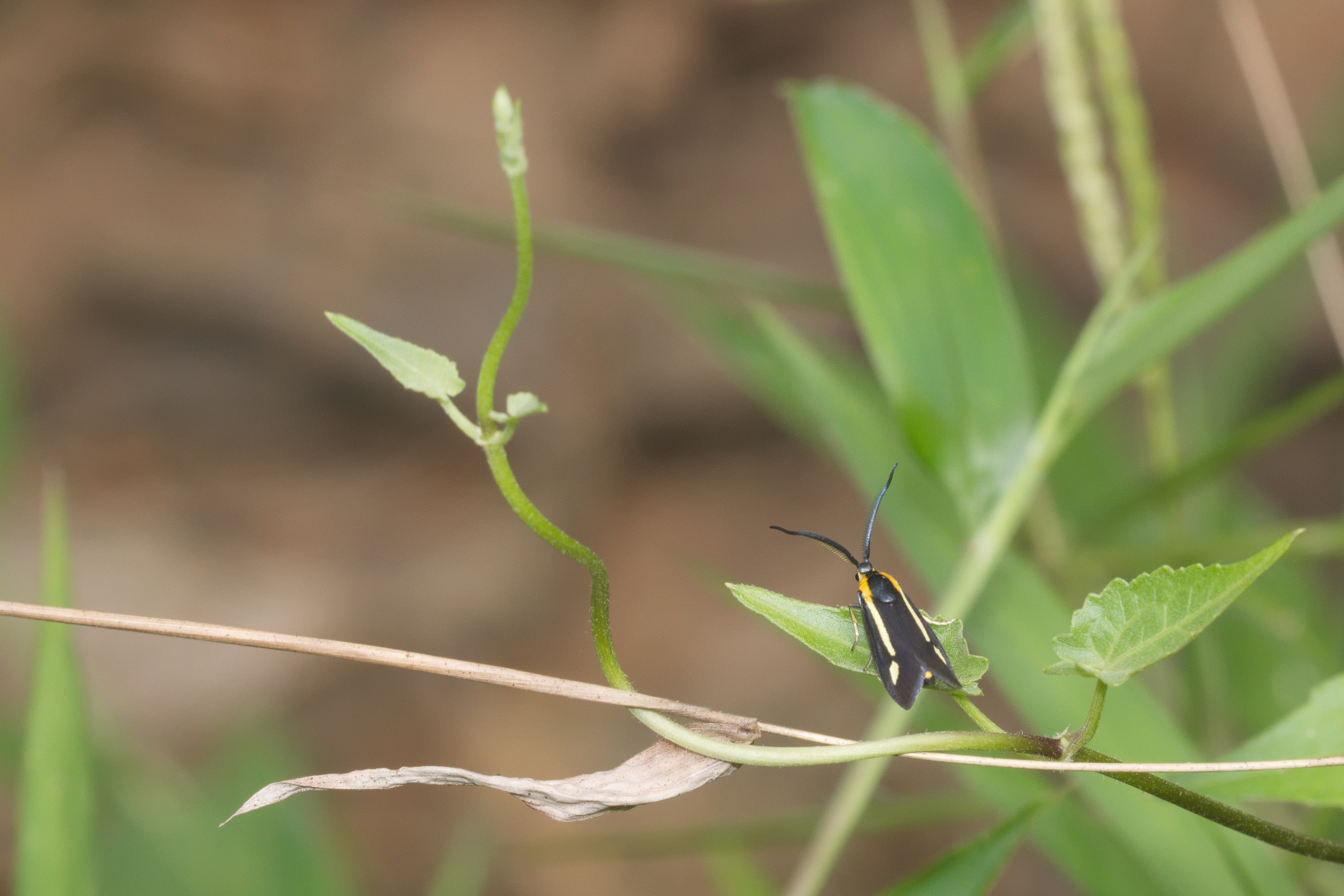
- Artona discivitta

Scientific classification
- Domain: Eukaryota
- Kingdom: Animalia
- Phylum: Arthropoda
- Class: Insecta
- Order: Lepidoptera
- Family: Zygaenidae
- Subfamily: Procridinae; Boisduval, 1828

= Procridinae =

Subfamily of moths

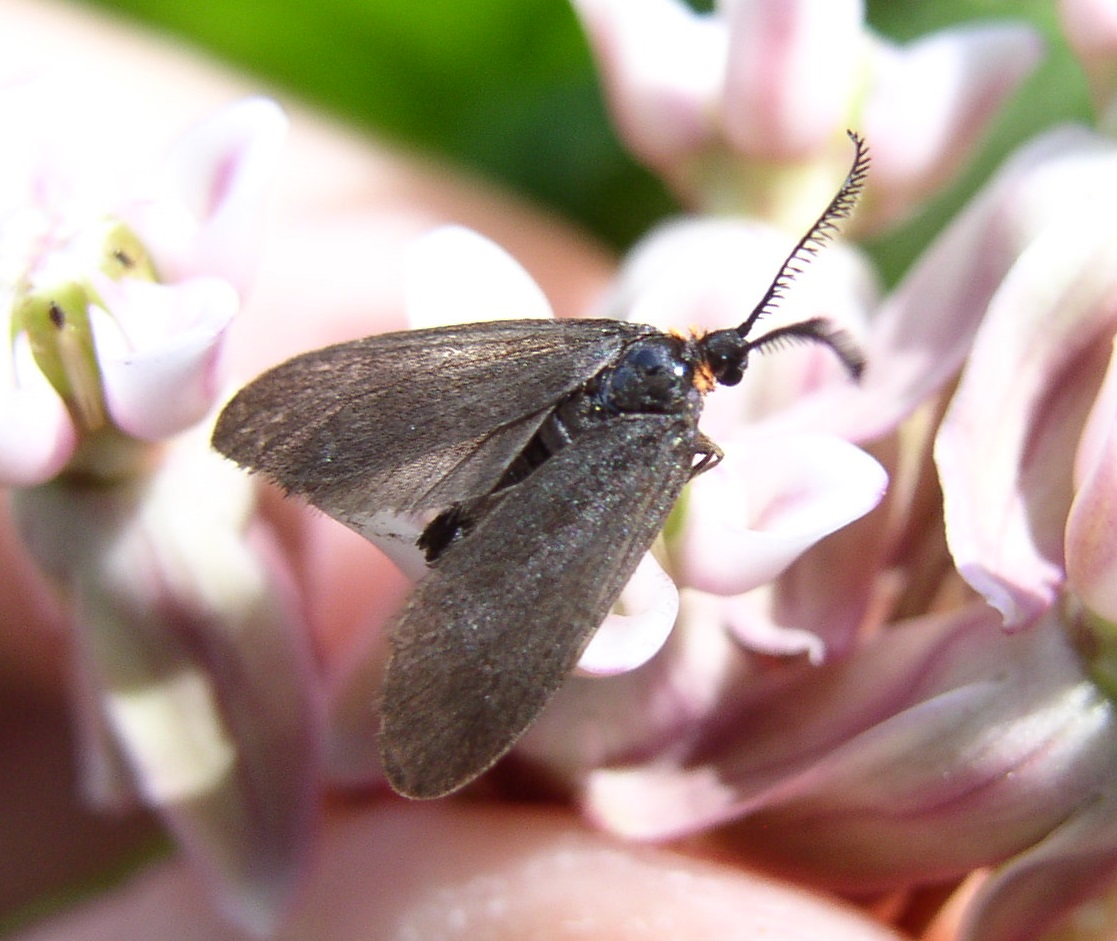
Acoloithus falsarius on milkweed

Procridinae is a subfamily of the family Zygaenidae.

== Selected genera ==
- Aethioprocris Alberti, 1954
- Alteramenelikia Alberti, 1971
- Acoloithus Clemens, 1860
- Adscita Retzius, 1783
- Ankasocris Viette, 1965
- Artona Walker, 1854
- Astyloneura Gaede, 1914
- Australartona Tarmann, 2005
- Chalconycles Jordan, 1907
- Clelea Walker, 1854
- Euclimaciopsis Tremewan, 1973
- Gonioprocris Jordan, 1913
- Harrisina Packard, 1864
- Hestiochora Meyrick, 1886
- Homophylotis Turner, 1904
- Ischnusia Jordan, 1928
- Janseola Hopp, 1923
- Jordanita Verity, 1946
- Madaprocris Viette, 1978
- Malamblia Jordan, 1907
- Metanycles Butler, 1876
- Myrtartona Tarmann, 2005
- Neobalataea Alberti, 1954
- Neoprocris Jordan, 1915
- Palmartona Tarmann, 2005
- Pollanisus Walker, 1854
- Pyromorpha Herrich-Schäffer, [1854]
- Pseudoamuria Tarmann, 2005
- Pseudoprocris Druce in Godman & Salvin, 1884
- Onceropyga Turner, 1906
- Rhagades Wallengren, 1863
- Saliunca Walker, 1865
- Saliuncella Jordan, 1907
- Seryda Walker, 1856
- Sthenoprocris Hampson, 1920
- Syringura Holland, 1893
- Tascia Walker, 1856
- Tasema Walker, 1856
- Tetraclonia Jordan, 1913
- Theresimima Strand, 1917
- Thyrassia Butler, 1876
- Triacanthia Romieux, 1937
- Triprocris Grote, 1873
- Turneriprocris Bryk, 1936
- Urodopsis Jordan, 1913
- Xenoprocris Romieux, 1937
