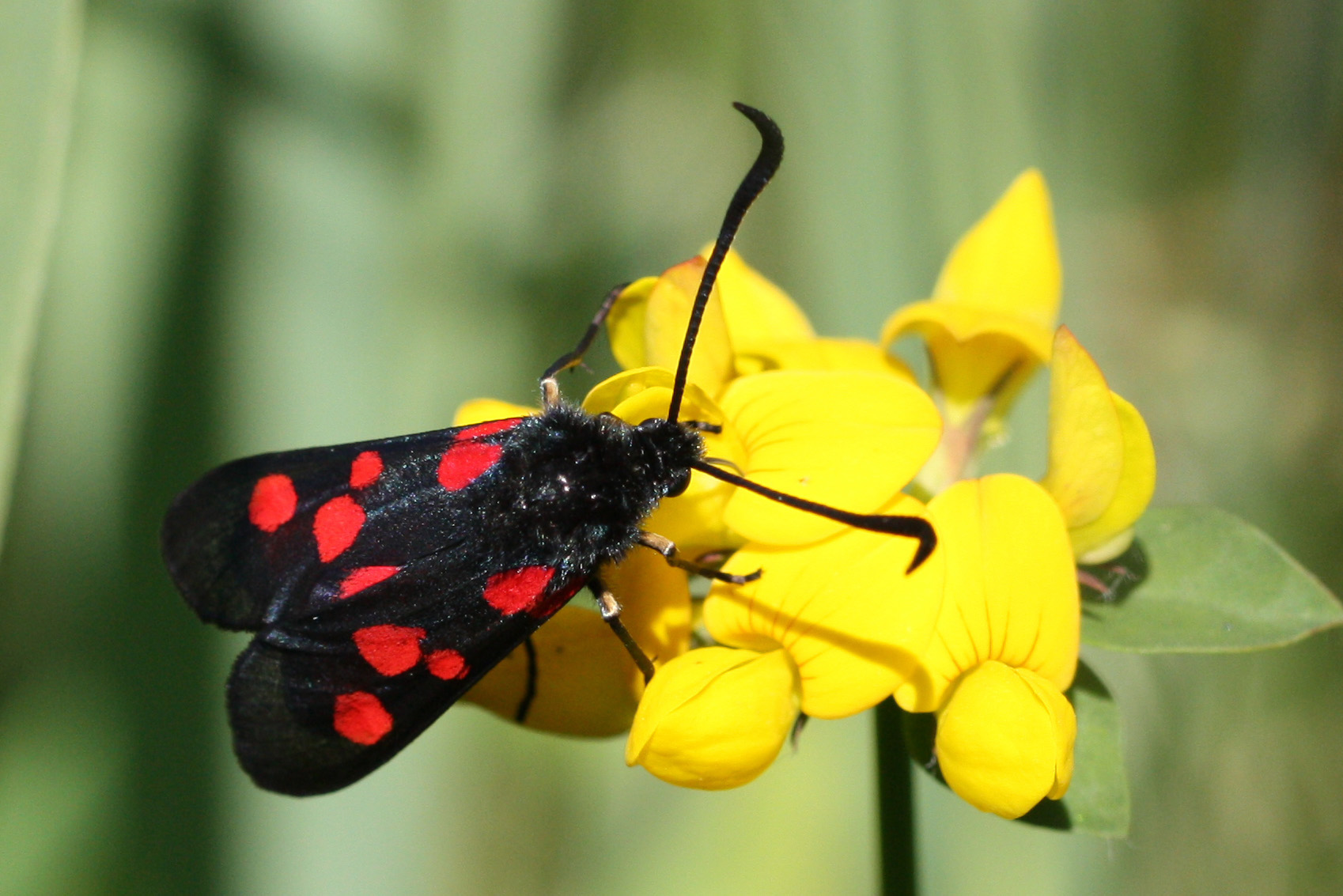
- At Strumpshaw Fen, Norfolk

Scientific classification
- Domain: Eukaryota
- Kingdom: Animalia
- Phylum: Arthropoda
- Class: Insecta
- Order: Lepidoptera
- Family: Zygaenidae
- Genus: Zygaena
- Species: Z. trifolii

Binomial name
- Zygaena trifolii (Esper, 1783)

Synonyms
- Sphinx trifolii Esper, 1783; Zygaena trifolii vindilisensis Leraut, 2012

= Zygaena trifolii =

Five-spot burnet

Species of moth

Zygaena trifolii, the five-spot burnet, is a day-flying moth in the family Zygaenidae found in North Africa and Europe. It was described by the German zoologist Eugenius Johann Christoph Esper in 1783 from the type specimen found in Frankfurt am Main, Germany.

== Description ==
The wingspan is 28–33 mm. Adults are on wing from the mid-June to the beginning of August in one generation per year.

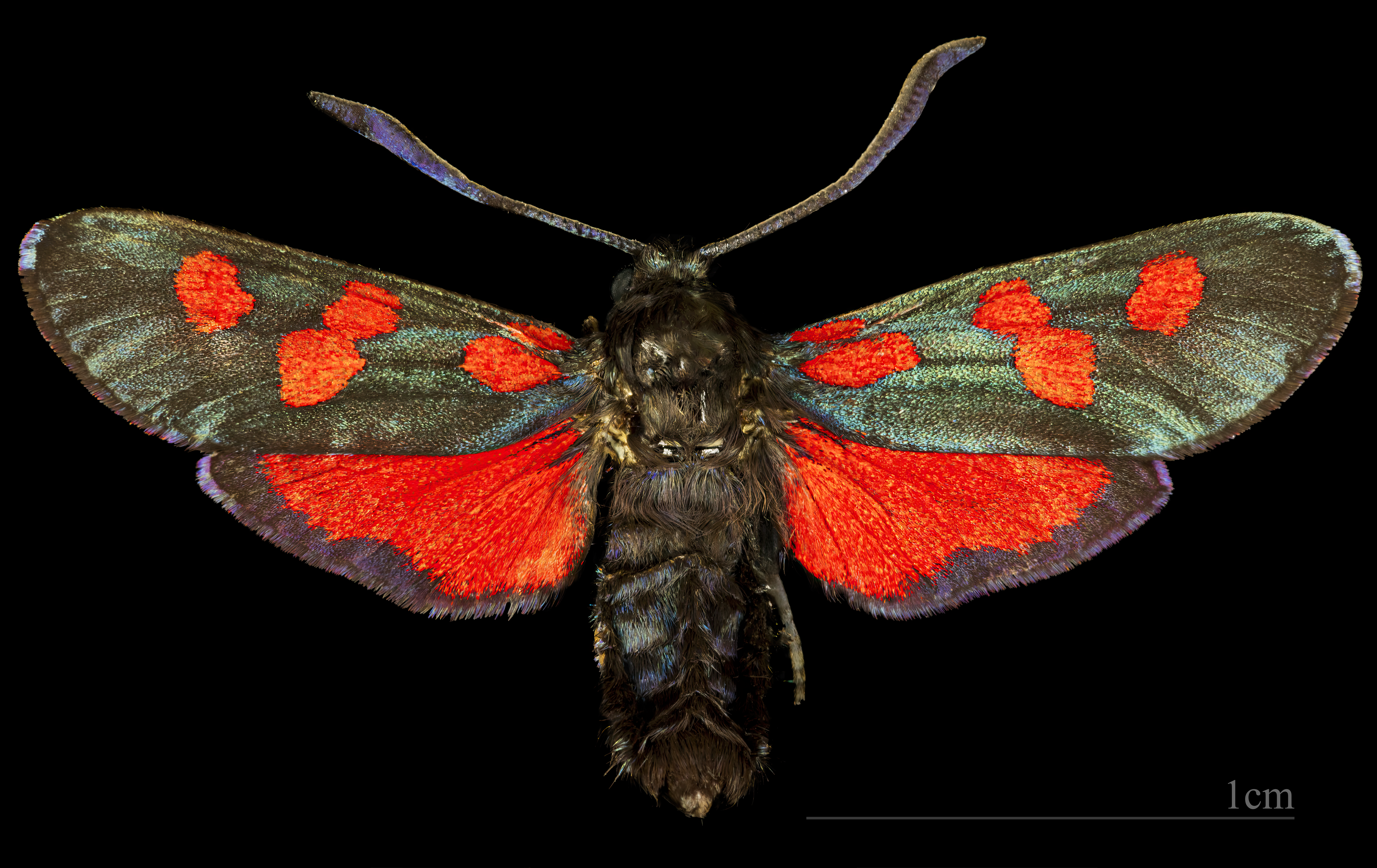
♂

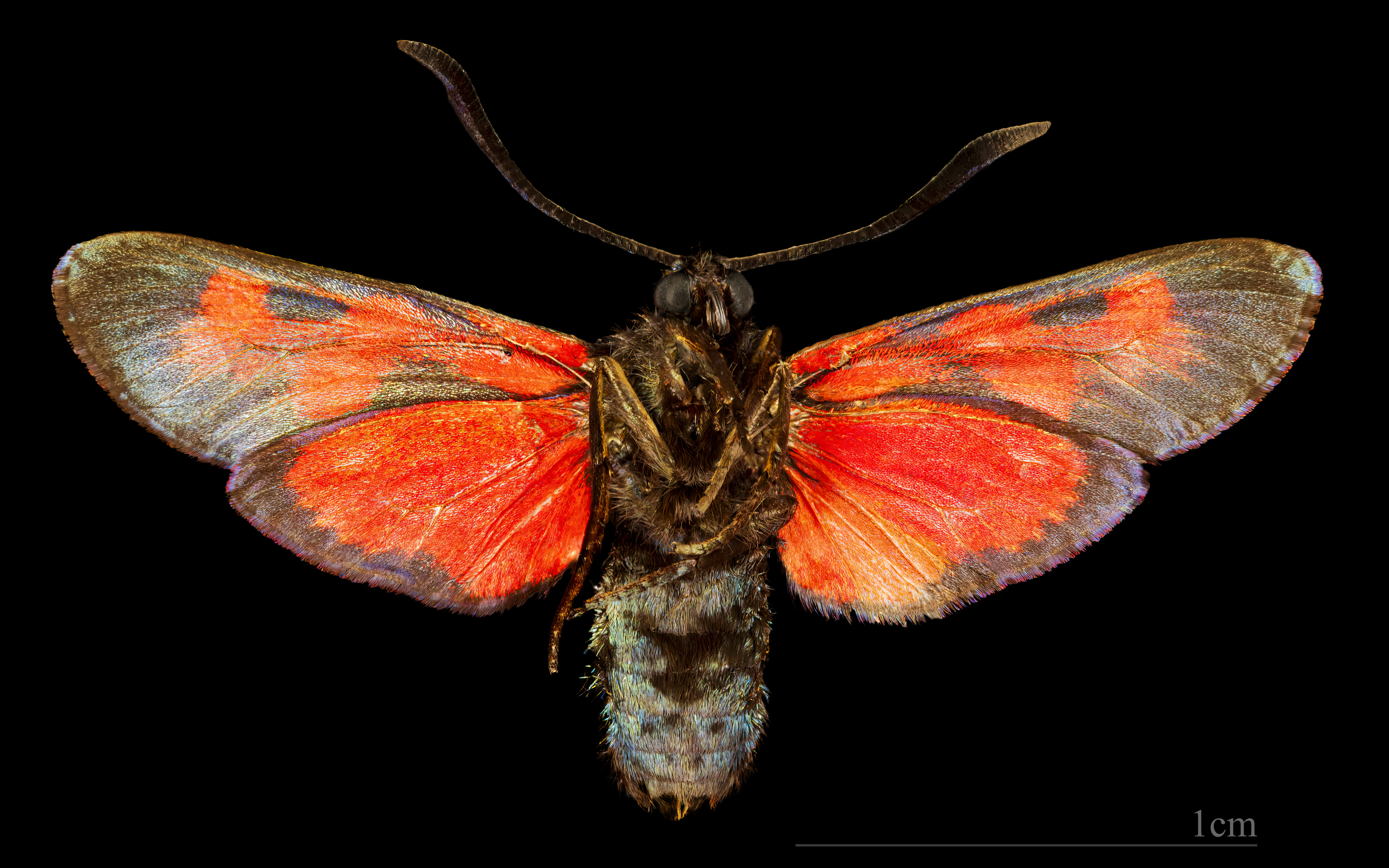
♂ △

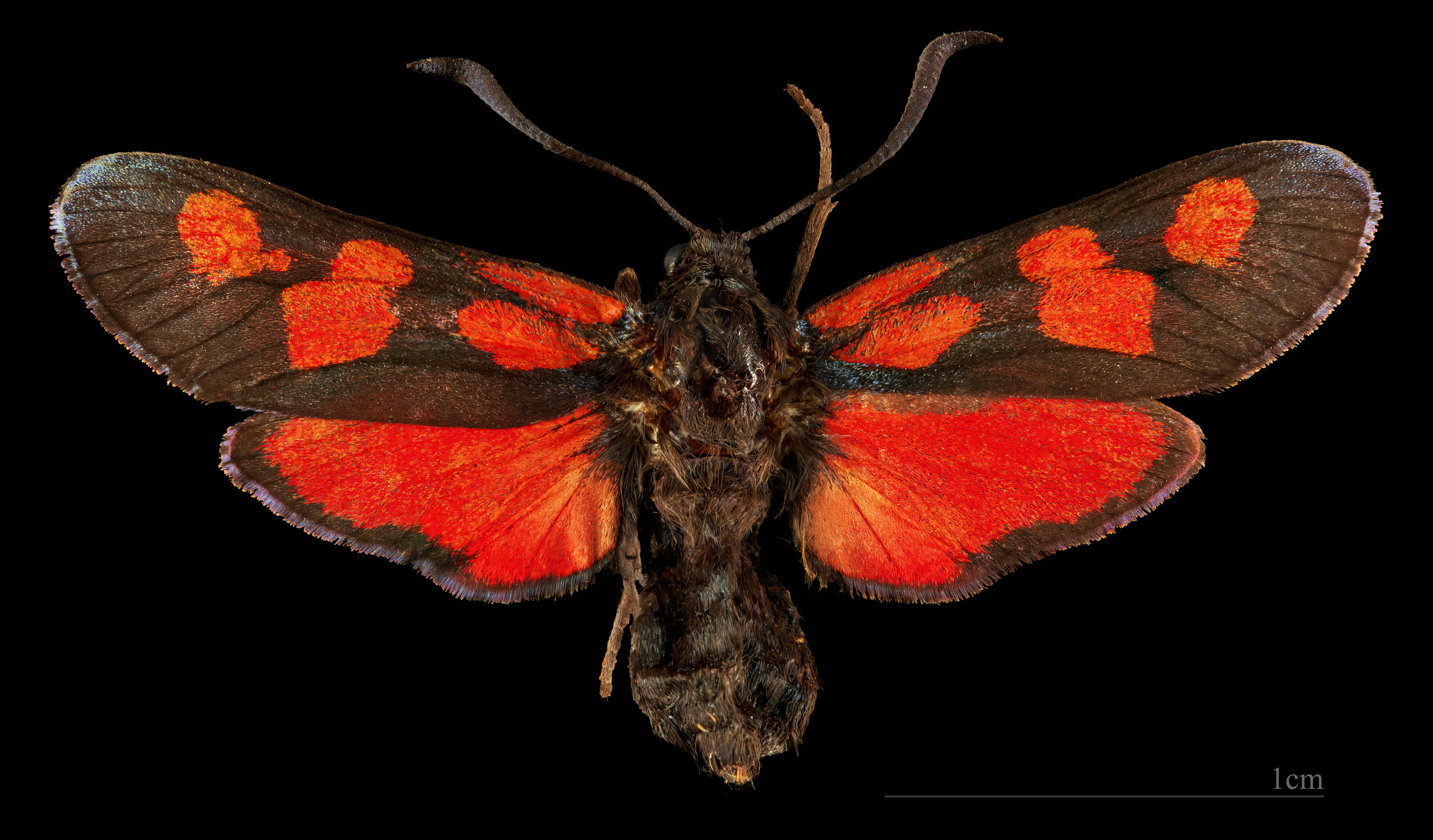
♀

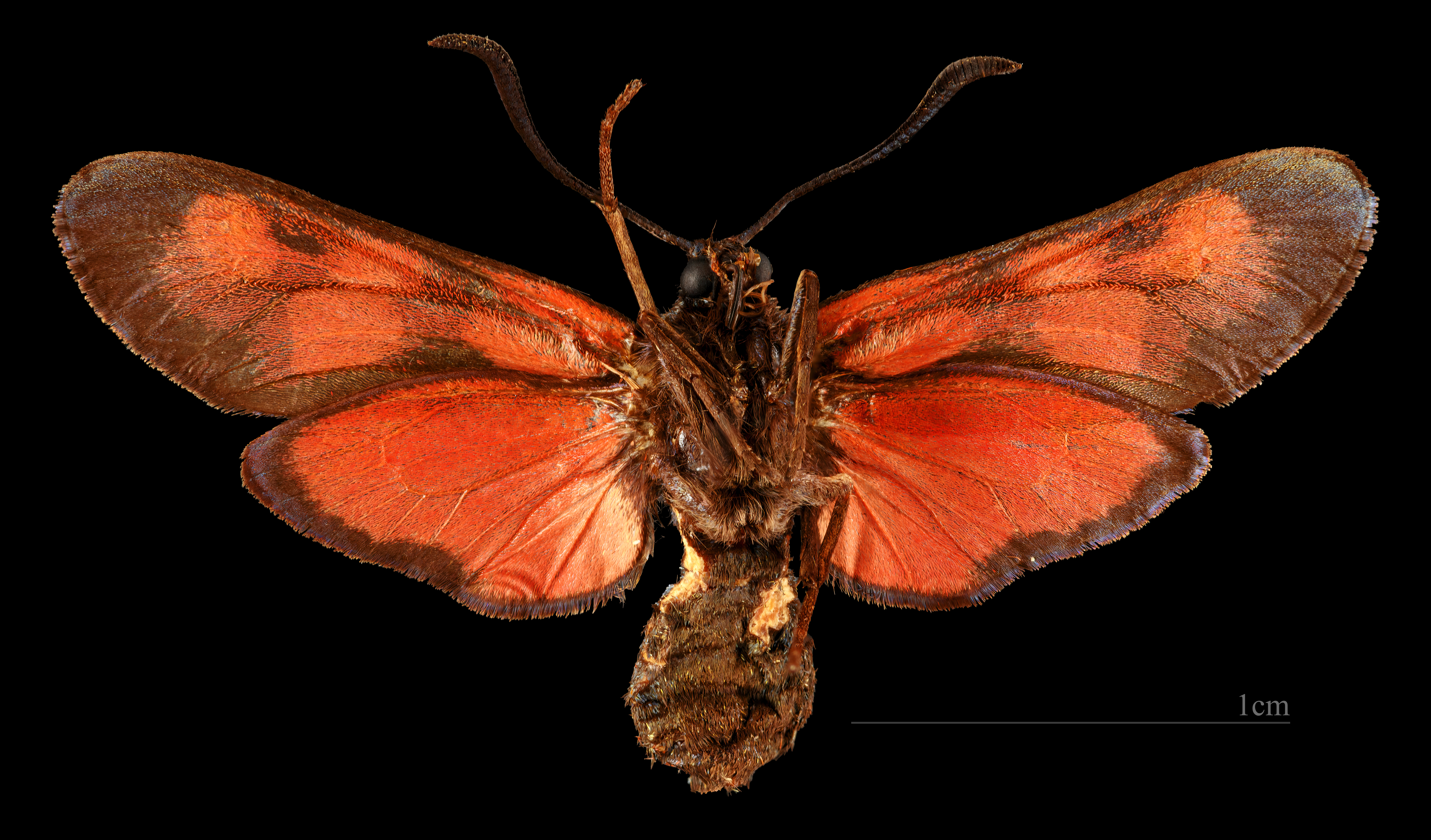
♀ △

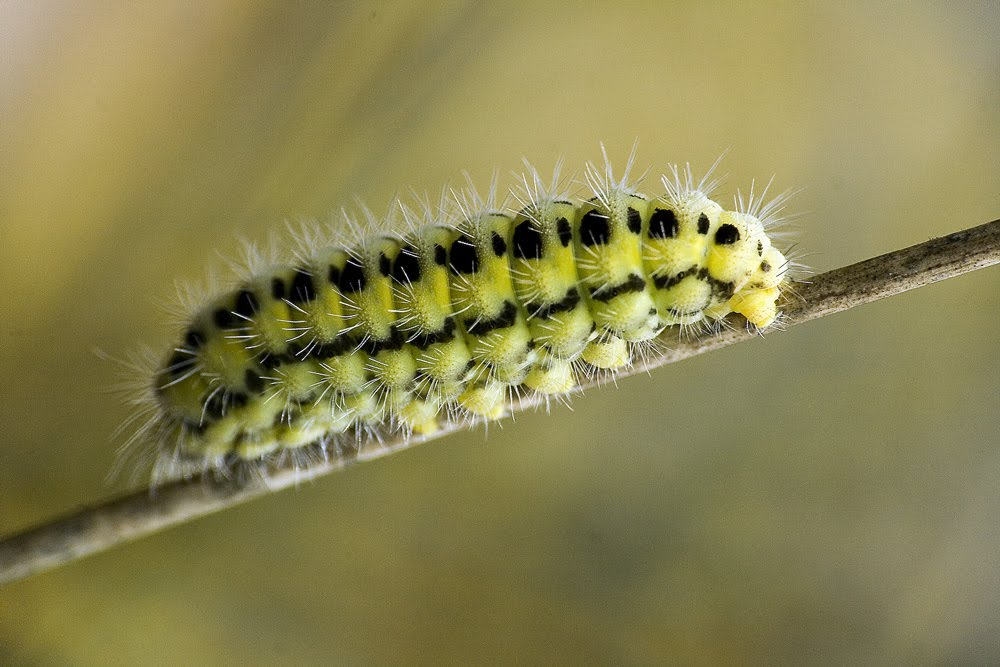
Larva

Ovum

Eggs are pale yellow and deposited in several layers to form an irregularly shaped batch.

Larvae

The larvae feed on the leaves of greater bird's-foot trefoil (Lotus uliginosus) and bird's-foot trefoil (Lotus corniculatus). The species overwinters in the larval stage and may overwinter twice.

Pupa

The pupa is shiny, black or blackish-brown and 10–18 mm long. Pupation of subsp descreta takes place in June and July in a cocoon which is spun high on marsh vegetation such as soft rush (Juncus effusus). Pupation of subsp palustrella takes place close to the ground and concealed amongst grass and other herbage in late-April to May. The cocoon is fusiform, irregularly ribbed and ranges from dirty white to creamy-white to bright yellow.

=== Subspecies ===
Distributions where known.

- Zygaena trifolii trifolii
- Zygaena trifolii barcelonensis Reiss, 1922
- Zygaena trifolii caerulescens Oberthur, 1910
- Zygaena trifolii decreta Verity, 1925 (Great Britain)
- Zygaena trifolii duponcheliana Oberthur, 1910
- Zygaena trifolii espunnica Reiss, 1936
- Zygaena trifolii hibera Verity, 1925
- Zygaena trifolii lusitaniaemixta Verity, 1930
- Zygaena trifolii olbiana Oberthur, 1910
- Zygaena trifolii palustrella Verity, 1925 (Great Britain)
- Zygaena trifolii palustris Oberthur, 1896
- Zygaena trifolii pusilla Oberthur, 1910
- Zygaena trifolii subsyracusia Verity, 1925
- Zygaena trifolii syracusia Zeller, 1847 (the Channel Islands and the coastal regions of north-western France from Loire-Atlantique to Côtes-d'Armor and Ille-et-Vilaine)

== Distribution ==
It is found in North Africa (Algeria, Morocco and Tunisia through the western Mediterranean, Great Britain and central Europe to Ukraine. It is not found in Scandinavia.

== Taxonomy ==
The Danish zoologist, Johan Christian Fabricius initially raised the name Zygaena as the name for the fourth section of Carl Linnaeus classification of the moths and it was initially a family rather than a genus; containing 72 species of diverse moths. The first of the moths listed was filipendulae (the six-spot burnet), which may be the reason when Zygaena was relegated to genus level, it became associated with the burnets. The name has no relation to the actual moths, coming from the Greek zugaina and means a hammer-headed shark. The specific name trifolii, is from Trifolium – the clover genus, which are not larval food plants. The species has been divided into fourteen subspecies; Maitland Emmet gives meanings for the two subsp found in the UK. Subsp decreta was named by Ruggero Verity, from decretus – past part, or decerno – to separate, possibly to separate it from subsp palustrella. Subsp palustrella also named by Verity from paluster or palustris – belonging to a marsh; probably to indicate affinity with the Continental subsp palustris. The problem with the name is subsp palustrella occurs on dry downland, while subsp decreta occurs on marshes.
