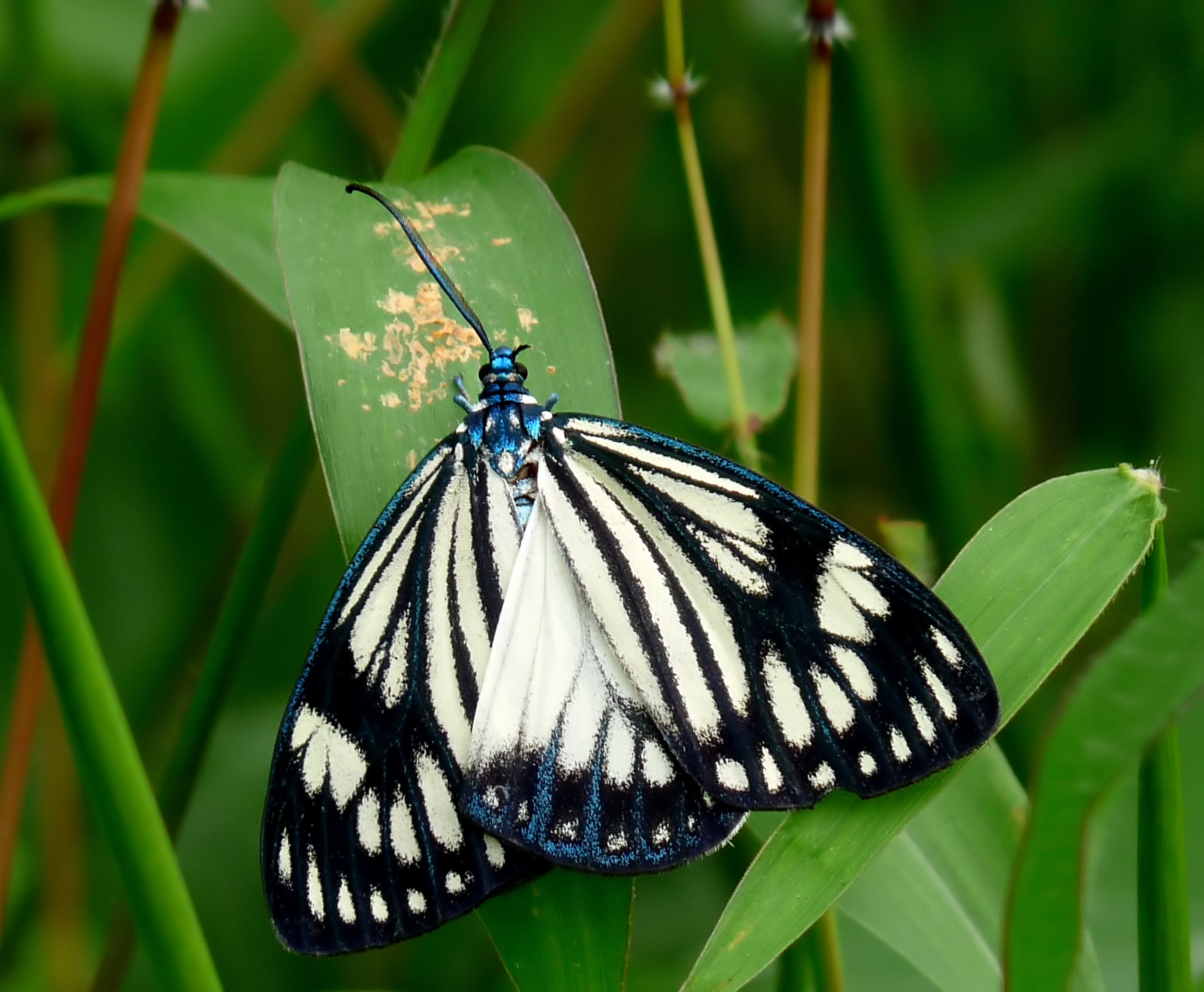
- Cyclosia papilionaris, female

Scientific classification
- Kingdom: Animalia
- Phylum: Arthropoda
- Class: Insecta
- Order: Lepidoptera
- Superfamily: Zygaenoidea
- Family: Zygaenidae; Latreille, 1809

Subfamilies
- Callizygaeninae; Chalcosiinae; Procridinae; Zygaeninae

= Zygaenidae =

Zygaenidae Temporal range: Rupelian–Present

Family of moths

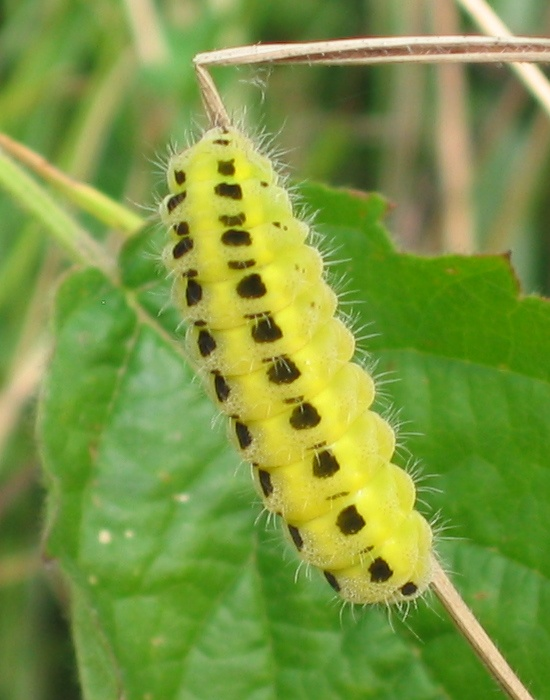
Larva showing warning colours, flattening

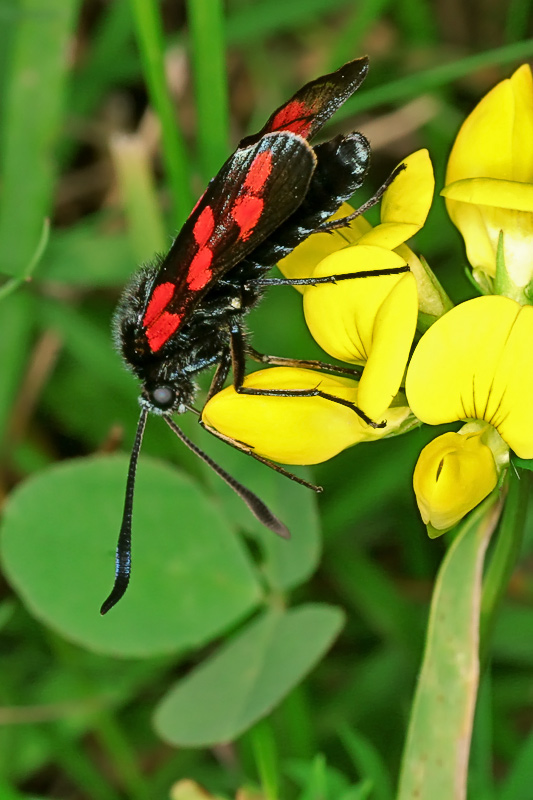
Zygaena filipendulae

The Zygaenidae moths are a family of Lepidoptera. The majority of zygaenids are tropical, but they are nevertheless quite well represented in temperate regions. Some of the 1000 or so species are commonly known as burnet or forester moths, often qualified by the number of spots, although other families also have 'foresters'. They are also sometimes called smoky moths.

All 43 species of Australian zygaenids are commonly known as foresters and belong to the tribe Artonini. The only nonendemic species in Australia is Palmartona catoxantha, a Southeast Asian pest species which is believed to be already present in Australia or likely to arrive soon.

== Description ==
=== Larvae ===
Larvae are stout and may be flattened. A fleshy extension of the thorax covers the head. Most feed on herbaceous plants, but some are tree feeders. Larvae in two subfamilies, Chalcosiinae and Zygaeninae, have cavities in which they store the cyanide, and can excrete it as defensive droplets.

=== Aposematism in adults ===
Zygaenid moths are typically day flying with a slow, fluttering flight, and with rather clubbed antennae. They generally have a metallic sheen and often prominent spots of red or yellow. The bright colours are a warning to predators that the moths are distasteful - they contain hydrogen cyanide (HCN) throughout all stages of their life cycle. Unlike most insects with such toxins, they obtain glucosides from the plants they utilize so that HCN can be used as a defence. However, they are capable of making HCN themselves, and when in an environment poor in cyanide-producing plants, synthesize it themselves. They form mimicry complexes based on these toxins.

However, while the overall picture is of genuine aposematism – the insects are both conspicuously coloured and toxic, containing cyanogenic glucosides – a study by Emmanuelle Briolat and colleagues including Martin Stevens found no evidence of a quantitative relationship between the visual signals of different species of Zygaenidae and their toxicity.

== Evolution ==
The fossil species Neurosymploca? oligocenica, belonging to the subfamily Zygaeninae, is known from Lower Stampian (Early Oligocene) deposits in Céreste, Alpes-de-Haute-Provence, France. Lepidopterans with preserved structural coloration from the Eocene (~47 Ma) shales of the Messel Pit, Germany, are suggested to be zygaenids, and more specifically procridines due to wing venation patterns.

== Economic importance ==
The grapeleaf skeletonizer can be a problem in vineyards, feeding on foliage and can also be found feeding on Virginia creeper.

== Selected taxa ==
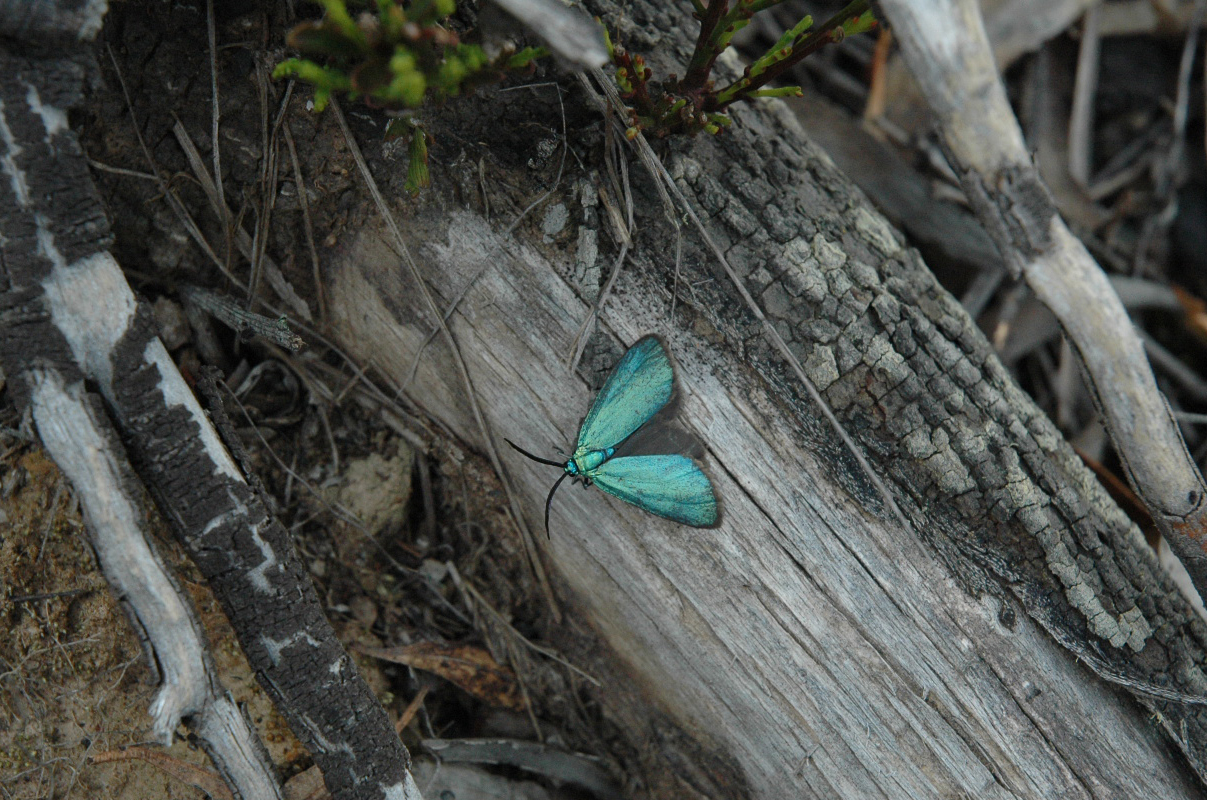
Satin-green forester (Pollanisus viridipulverulenta) found in most of Australia (including temperate Tasmania)

Genera incertae sedis include:

- Acoloithus
- Harrisina
- Pyromorpha
- Reissita
- Seryda
- Tetraclonia
- Triprocris

Pest species include:

- Almond-tree leaf skeletonizer moth (Aglaope infausta)
- Vine bud moth (Theresimima ampellophaga)
- Grapeleaf skeletonizer (Harrisina americana)

South European species:

- Zygaena fausta

UK species:

- Scarce forester (Jordanita globulariae)
- Cistus forester (Adscita geryon)
- Green forester (Adscita statices)
- Scotch burnet (Zygaena exulans)
- Slender Scotch burnet (Zygaena loti)
- New Forest burnet (Zygaena viciae)
- Six-spot burnet (Zygaena filipendulae)
- Five-spot burnet (Zygaena trifolii)
- Narrow-bordered five-spot burnet (Zygaena lonicerae)
- Transparent burnet (Zygaena purpuralis)

African species:

- Fire grid burnet (Arniocera erythopyga)

Extinct species:

- Neurosymploca? oligocenica Fernández-Rubio & Nel, 2000 (Lower Stampian, Céreste, Alpes-de-Haute-Provence, France)

== See also ==
- List of zygaenid genera
