= List of moths of Nepal (Zygaenidae) =

The following is a list of Zygaenidae of Nepal. Thirty-seven different species are listed.

This list is primarily based on Colin Smith's 2010 "Lepidoptera of Nepal", which is based on Toshiro Haruta's "Moths of Nepal (Vol. 1-6)" with some recent additions and a modernized classification.

- Achelura bifasciata
- Agalope glacialis - glacial-winged moth
- Agalope butleri
- Agalope harutei
- Agalope hyalina
- Agalope primularis
- Agalope suzukikojii
- Alophogaster rubribasis
- Amesia aliris
- Arachotia flaviplaga
- Artona walkeri syn. Artona confusa
- Callamesia midama
  - Callamesia midama f. hormenoa
- Campylotes histrionicus
- Campylotes sikkimensis
- Chalcophaedra zuleika
- Chacosia auxo albata
- Clelea discriminis
- Corma maculata
- Cyclosia papilionaris

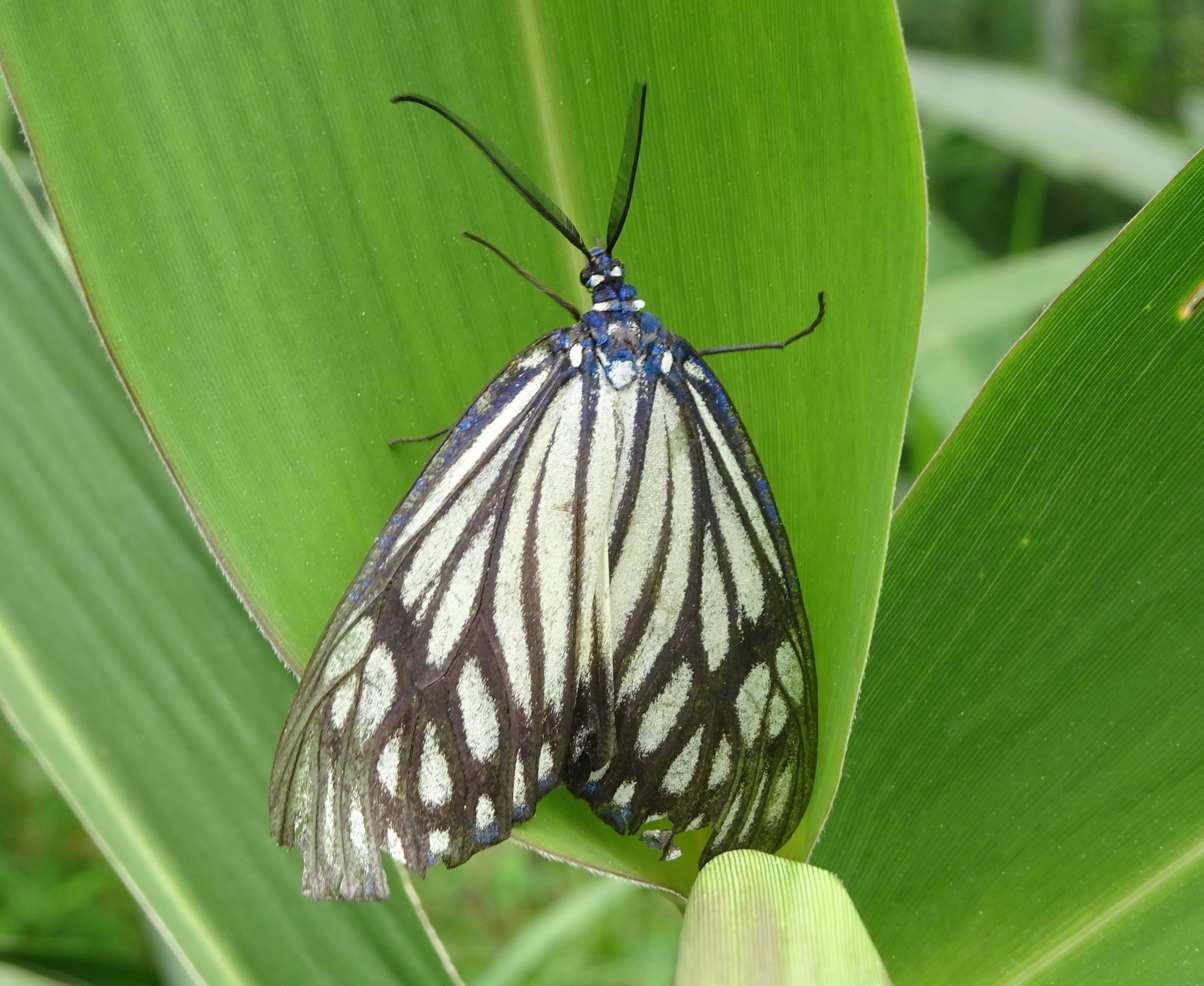
Cyclosia papilionaris in Pokhara, Lakeside

- Erasmia pulchella pulchella
- Eterusia aedea edocla f. dulcis - red-slug moth
- Eterusia aedea edocla f. edocla

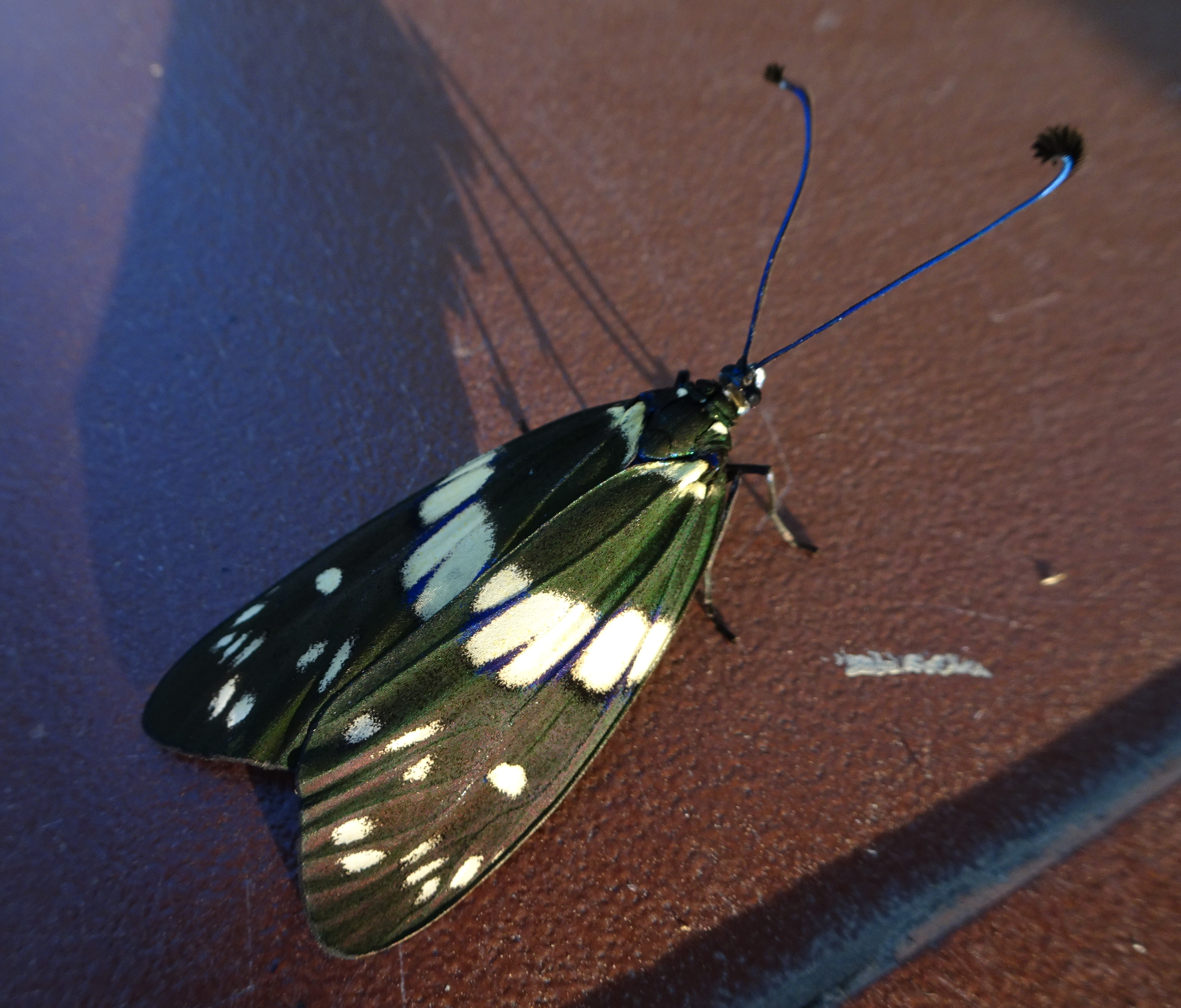
Eterusia aedea edocla in Kathmandu, Durbar Marga

- Eterusia tricolor
- Eumorphopsis leis
- Gynautocera papilionaria
- Histia flabellicornis flabellicornis
- Lophosoma cuprea
- Milleria adalifa
- Phacusa tenebrosa
- Phauda flammans
- Philopata basimacula
- Pidorus glaucopis
- Pidorus leno
- Soritia bicolor
- Soritia circinata
- Soritia pulchella
- Soritia risa
- Praezygaena caschmirensis

== See also ==
- List of butterflies of Nepal
- Odonata of Nepal
- Cerambycidae of Nepal
- Wildlife of Nepal
