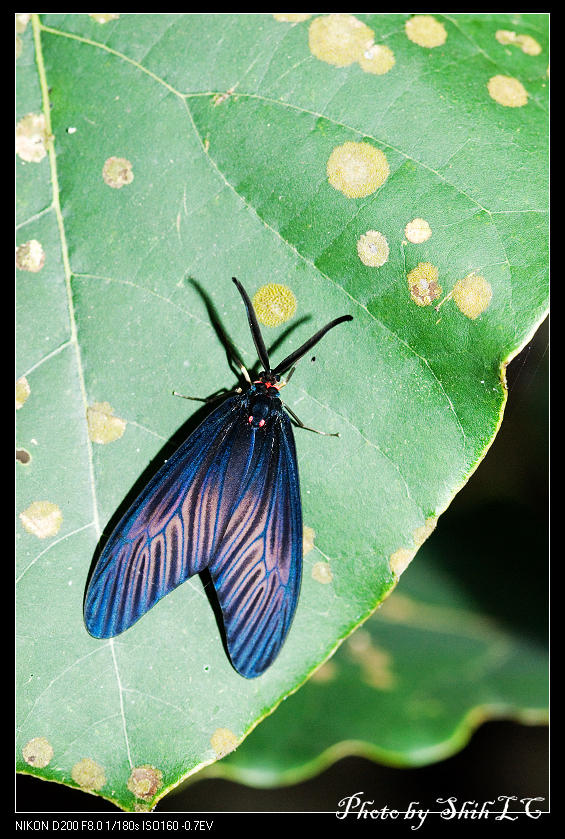

Scientific classification
- Kingdom: Animalia
- Phylum: Arthropoda
- Class: Insecta
- Order: Lepidoptera
- Family: Zygaenidae
- Genus: Gynautocera
- Species: G. rubriscutellata

Binomial name
- Gynautocera rubriscutellata Hering, 1922

= Gynautocera rubriscutellata =

Species of insect

Gynautocera rubriscutellata is a species of moth of the family Zygaenidae found in Taiwan. It was first described by Erich Martin Hering in 1922.

== Description ==
Gynautocera rubriscutellata is a diurnal species, active in low elevation areas, with a wingspan of 85–90 mm. Its hindwings are shorter than that of Histia flabellicornis, another species of Zygaenidae with a similar appearance. Part of its hindwings bear metallic blue coloration. It is also very similar in appearance to G. papilionaria, which is also found in southeast Asia.

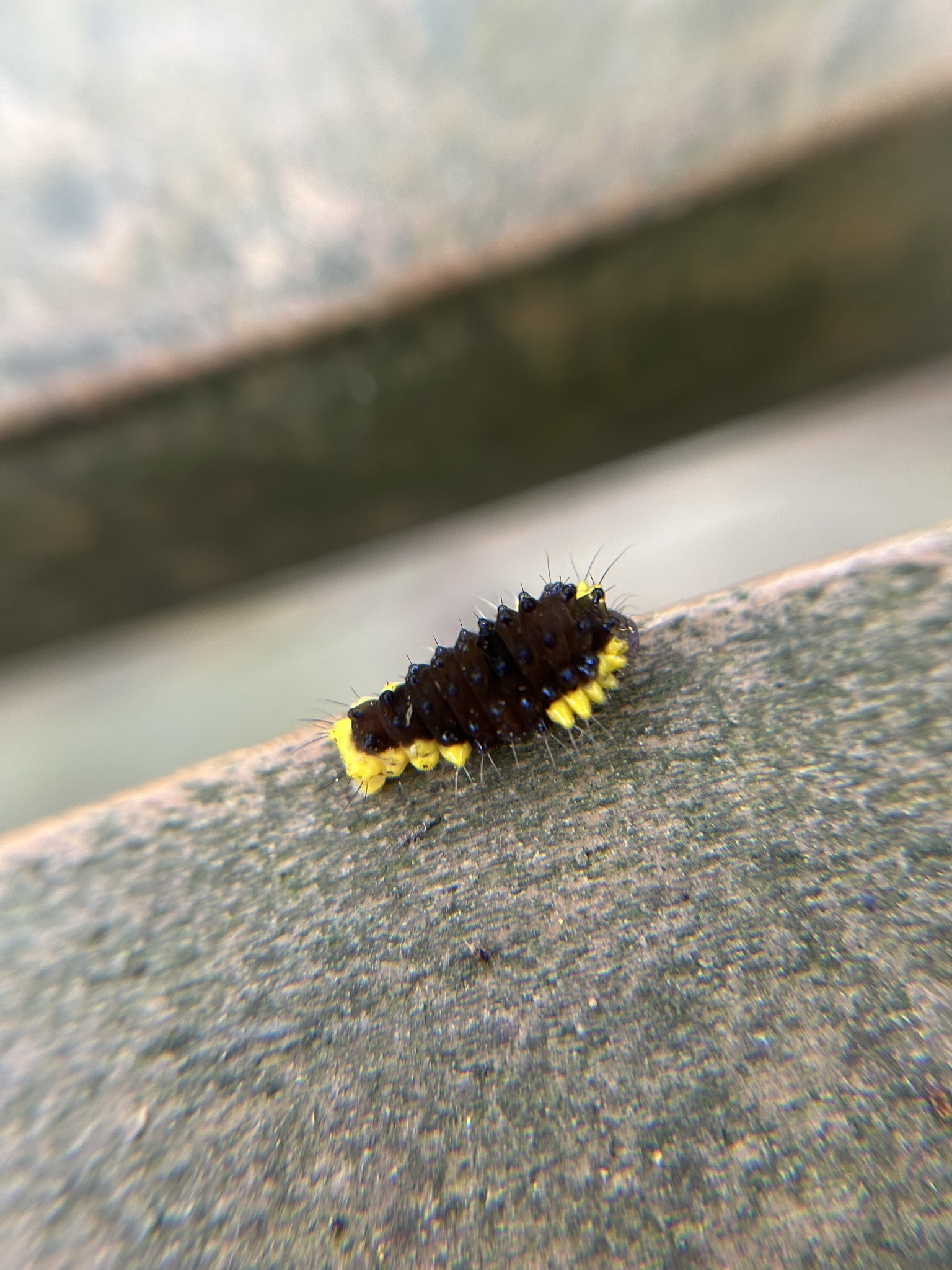
Gynautocera rubriscutellata larva

G. rubriscutellata larvae are black or dark brown with bright yellow vertical stripes marking the front and back of their bodies.
