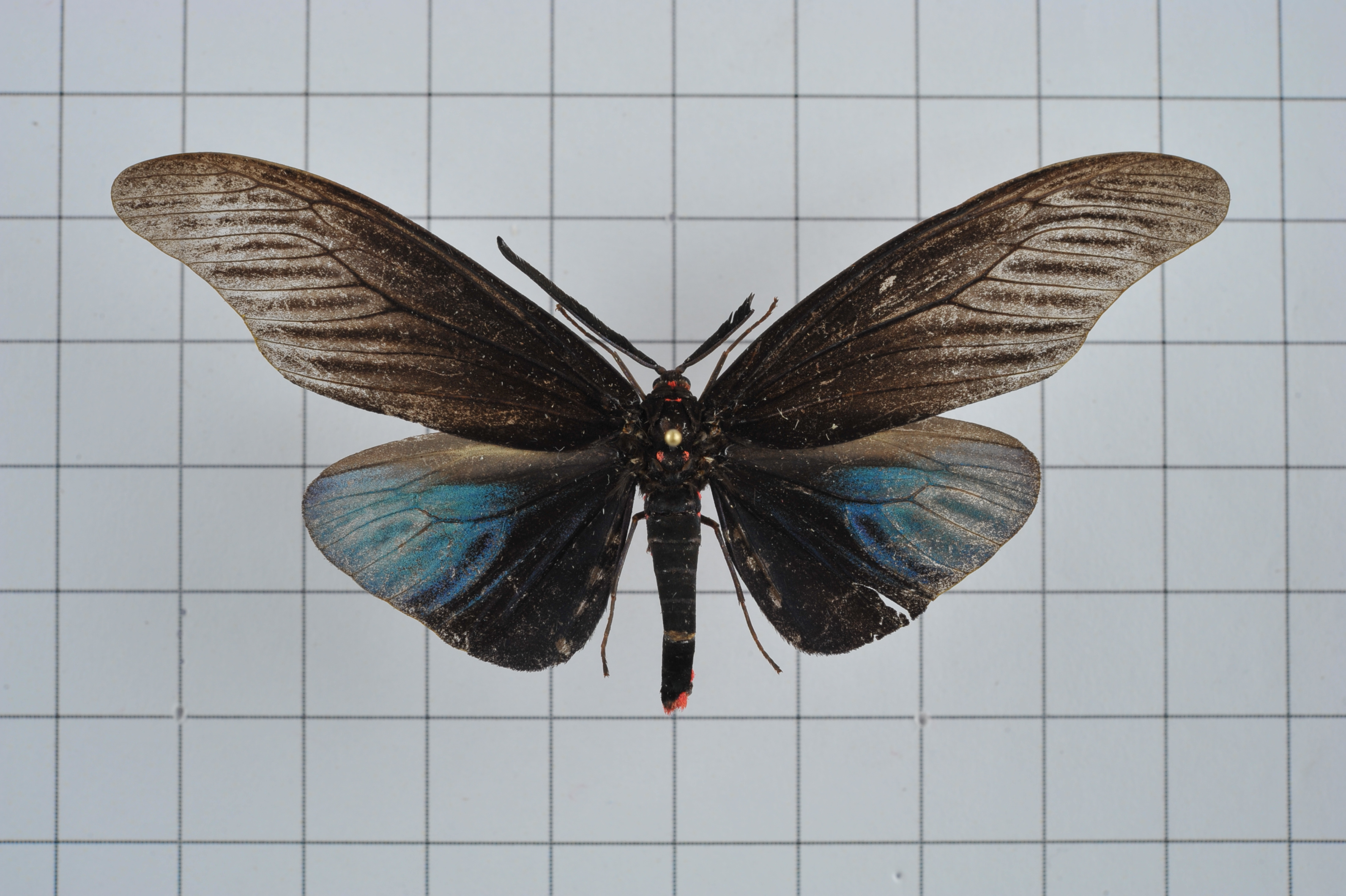
- Gynautocera rubriscutellata

Scientific classification
- Kingdom: Animalia
- Phylum: Arthropoda
- Clade: Pancrustacea
- Class: Insecta
- Order: Lepidoptera
- Family: Zygaenidae
- Subfamily: Chalcosiinae
- Genus: Gynautocera; Guérin-Méneville, 1831

= Gynautocera =

Genus of moths

Gynautocera is a genus of moths of the family Zygaenidae.

== Species ==
- Gynautocera buruensis
- Gynautocera celebensis
- Gynautocera djilolensis
- Gynautocera fraterna
- Gynautocera papilionaria
- Gynautocera pavo
- Gynautocera philippinensis
- Gynautocera philomela
- Gynautocera rara
- Gynautocera reducta
- Gynautocera rubriscutellata
- Gynautocera selene
- Gynautocera virescens
- Gynautocera zara
