= Corma tamosi =

Scientific classification
- Kingdom: Animalia
- Phylum: Arthropoda
- Clade: Pancrustacea
- Class: Insecta
- Order: Lepidoptera
- Family: Zygaenidae
- Genus: Corma
- Species: C. tamosi

Binomial name
- Corma tamosi Lemée, 1950

Species of moth

Corma tamosi is a species of moth in the family Zygaenidae. It is known from Trinidad.
