= Milleria lingnami =

Scientific classification
- Domain: Eukaryota
- Kingdom: Animalia
- Phylum: Arthropoda
- Class: Insecta
- Order: Lepidoptera
- Family: Zygaenidae
- Genus: Milleria
- Species: M. lingnami

Binomial name
- Milleria lingnami Mell, 1922

Synonyms
- Milleria lingnami f. ernina Hering, 1925

Species of moth

Milleria lingnami is a moth in the family Zygaenidae. It is found in China.
