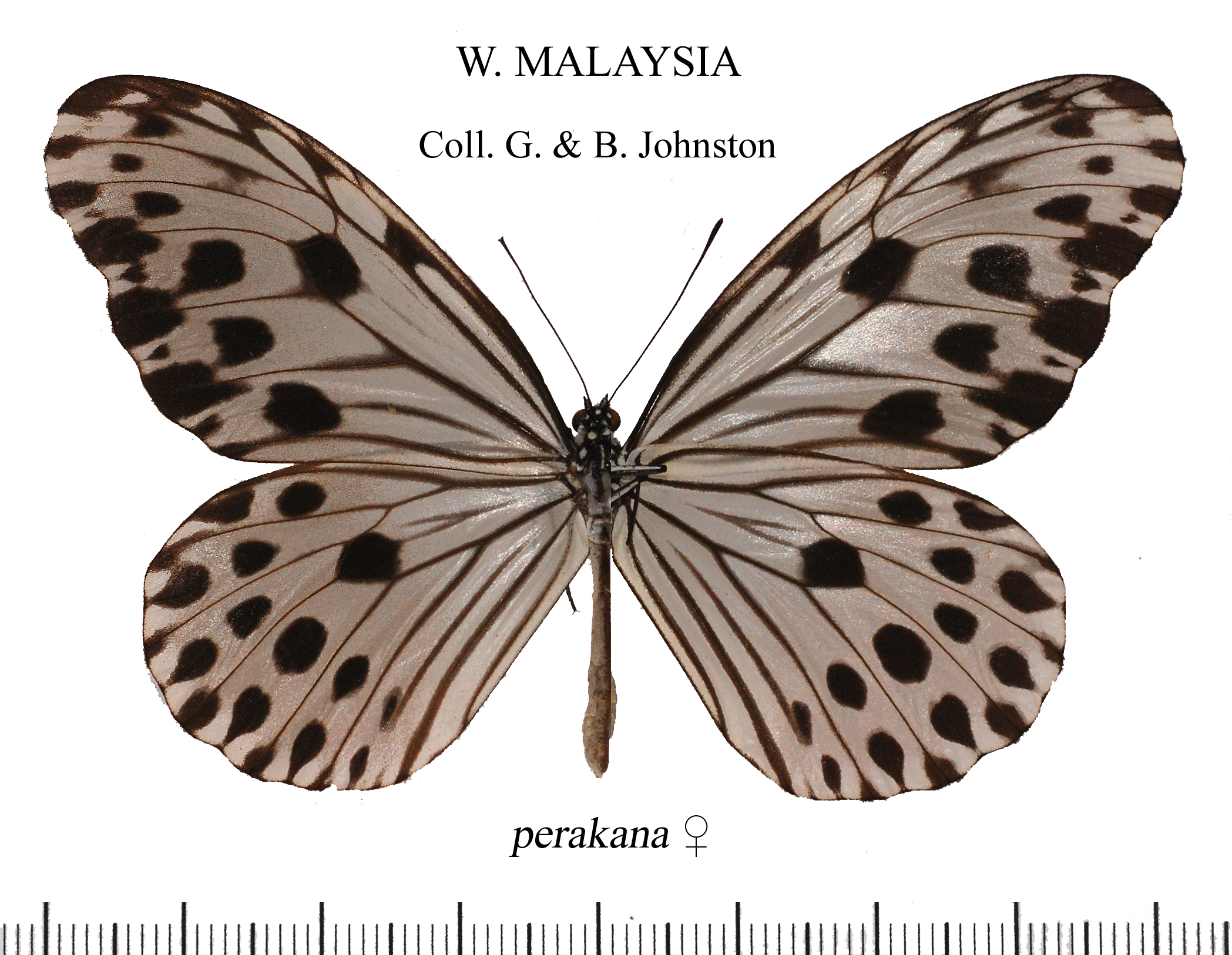
- Ideopsis gaura perakana

Scientific classification
- Kingdom: Animalia
- Phylum: Arthropoda
- Clade: Pancrustacea
- Class: Insecta
- Order: Lepidoptera
- Family: Nymphalidae
- Genus: Ideopsis
- Species: I. gaura

Binomial name
- Ideopsis gaura (Horsfield, [1829])

Subspecies
- Many, see text

Synonyms
- Idea diardi Vollenhoven, 1860

= Ideopsis gaura =

Smaller wood nymph

Species of butterfly

Ideopsis gaura, the smaller wood nymph, is a species of nymphalid butterfly in the Danainae subfamily. It is found in Southeast Asia.

Larvae feed on Melodinus especially M. laevigatus.

Adults are mimicked by Graphium delessertii and Cyclosia pieridoides.

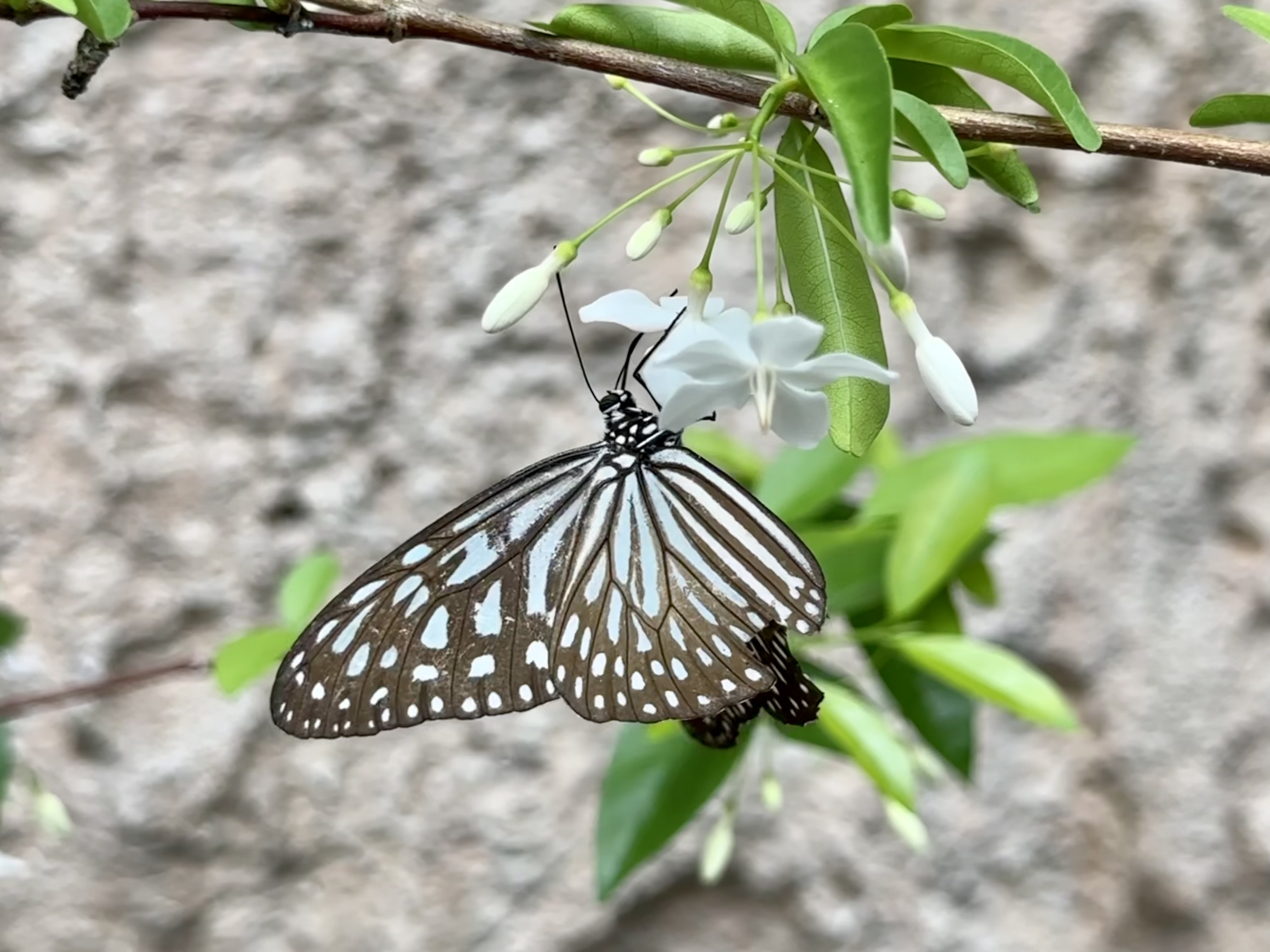
Ideopsis gaura, Malaysia

== Subspecies ==
Listed alphabetically:

- I. g. anapina Semper, 1892
- I. g. anapis (C. & R. Felder, 1861)
- I. g. bracara Fruhstofer, 1910
- I. g. canlaonii Jumalon, 1971
- I. g. costalis (Moore, 1883)
- I. g. daos (Boisduval, [1836])
- I. g. eudora (Gray, 1846)
- I. g. gaura (Horsfield, [1829])
- I. g. glaphyra Moore, 1883
- I. g. kajangensis Okubo, 1983
- I. g. lingana Fruhstorfer, 1910
- I. g. natunensis Fruhstorfer, 1910
- I. g. nigrocostalis Hagen, 1902
- I. g. messala Fruhstorfer, 1910
- I. g. palawana Fruhstorfer, 1910
- I. g. perakana Fruhstorfer, 1899
- I. g. pseudocostalis van Eecke, 1914
