= Milleria hamiltoni =

Scientific classification
- Domain: Eukaryota
- Kingdom: Animalia
- Phylum: Arthropoda
- Class: Insecta
- Order: Lepidoptera
- Family: Zygaenidae
- Genus: Milleria
- Species: M. hamiltoni

Binomial name
- Milleria hamiltoni C. Swinhoe, 1891

Species of moth

Milleria hamiltoni is a moth in the family Zygaenidae first described by Charles Swinhoe in 1891. It is mainly found in the Khasi Hills of Meghalaya, India.
