= Milleria rehfousi =

Scientific classification
- Domain: Eukaryota
- Kingdom: Animalia
- Phylum: Arthropoda
- Class: Insecta
- Order: Lepidoptera
- Family: Zygaenidae
- Genus: Milleria
- Species: M. rehfousi

Binomial name
- Milleria rehfousi (Oberthür, 1910)

Synonyms
- Psaphis rehfousi Oberthür, 1910

Species of moth

Milleria rehfousi is a moth in the family Zygaenidae that is found in China.
