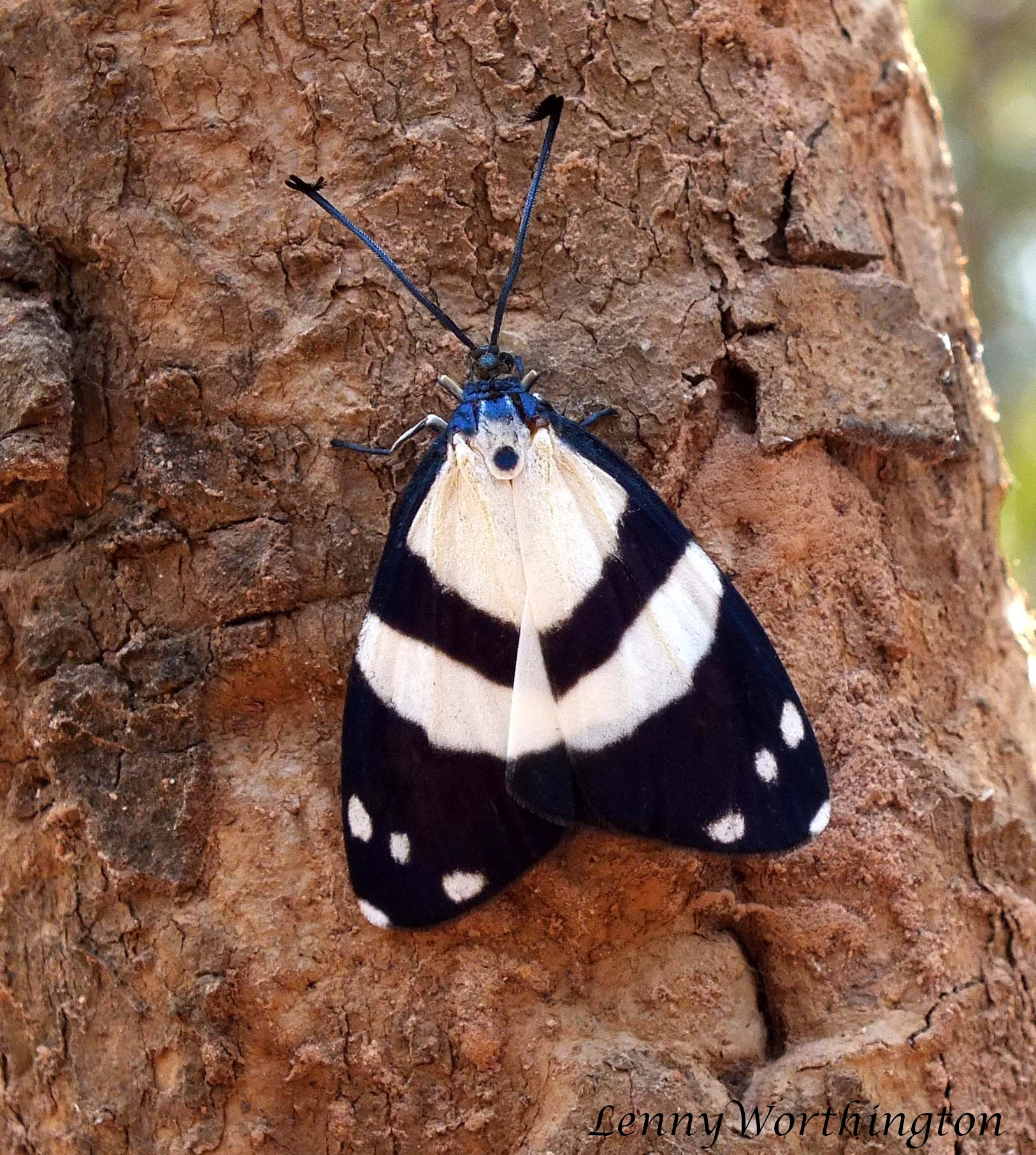

Scientific classification
- Kingdom: Animalia
- Phylum: Arthropoda
- Clade: Pancrustacea
- Class: Insecta
- Order: Lepidoptera
- Family: Zygaenidae
- Genus: Corma
- Species: C. zelica

Binomial name
- Corma zelica (Doubleday, 1847)

= Corma zelica =

Species of moth

Corma zelica is a species of moth in the family Zygaenidae described by Edward Doubleday in 1847.

== Description ==
Corma zelica has four patterns of black to white at the wings. at the head has a blue jay's crayon-blue like colour. at the antennae has a greyish colour and at the bottom of the black wings has white spots.
