= Milleria adalifoides =

Scientific classification
- Domain: Eukaryota
- Kingdom: Animalia
- Phylum: Arthropoda
- Class: Insecta
- Order: Lepidoptera
- Family: Zygaenidae
- Genus: Milleria
- Species: M. adalifoides

Binomial name
- Milleria adalifoides Schultze, 1925

Synonyms
- Milleriana adalifoides

Species of moth

Milleria adalifoides is a moth in the family Zygaenidae. It is found in the Philippines.
