= Cyclosia pieridoides =

Scientific classification
- Kingdom: Animalia
- Phylum: Arthropoda
- Class: Insecta
- Order: Lepidoptera
- Family: Zygaenidae
- Genus: Cyclosia
- Species: C. pieridoides

Binomial name
- Cyclosia pieridoides Walker, 1862

Synonyms
- Isbarta pandemia Rothschild, 1896; Cyclosia ficta Walker, 1862; Isbarta lactea Butler, 1883; Cyclosia subflava Moore, 1879; Cyclosia sumatraensis Talbot, 1929; Cyclosia transitaria Hering, 1922

Species of moth

Cyclosia pieridoides is a moth in the family Zygaenidae. It was described by Francis Walker in 1862. It is found in Asia.

Members of the nominate subspecies mimic members of the genus Idea and Ideopsis gaura. Members of the subspecies C. pieridoides binghami mimic members of the genus Delias.

== Subspecies ==
- Cyclosia pieridoides bangkana Hering, 1922 (Bangka)
- Cyclosia pieridoides belitungensis Kishida&Endo, 1999 (Belitung)
- Cyclosia pieridoides binghami Butler, 1882 (Indochina)
- Cyclosia pieridoides glauca Walker, 1856 (Sumatra, Mentawai)
- Cyclosia pieridoides hestinoides Walker, 1862 (Borneo)
- Cyclosia pieridoides labuana Hering, 1922 (Labuan)
- Cyclosia pieridoides pieriodes (Borneo)
- Cyclosia pieridoides subflava Moore, 1879 (Malakka)
- Cyclosia pieridoides sumatraensis Talbot, 1929 (Sumatra)
- Cyclosia pieridoides transitaria Hering, 1922 (Java)
- Cyclosia pieridoides virgo Jordan, 1907 (Peninsular Malaysia)
