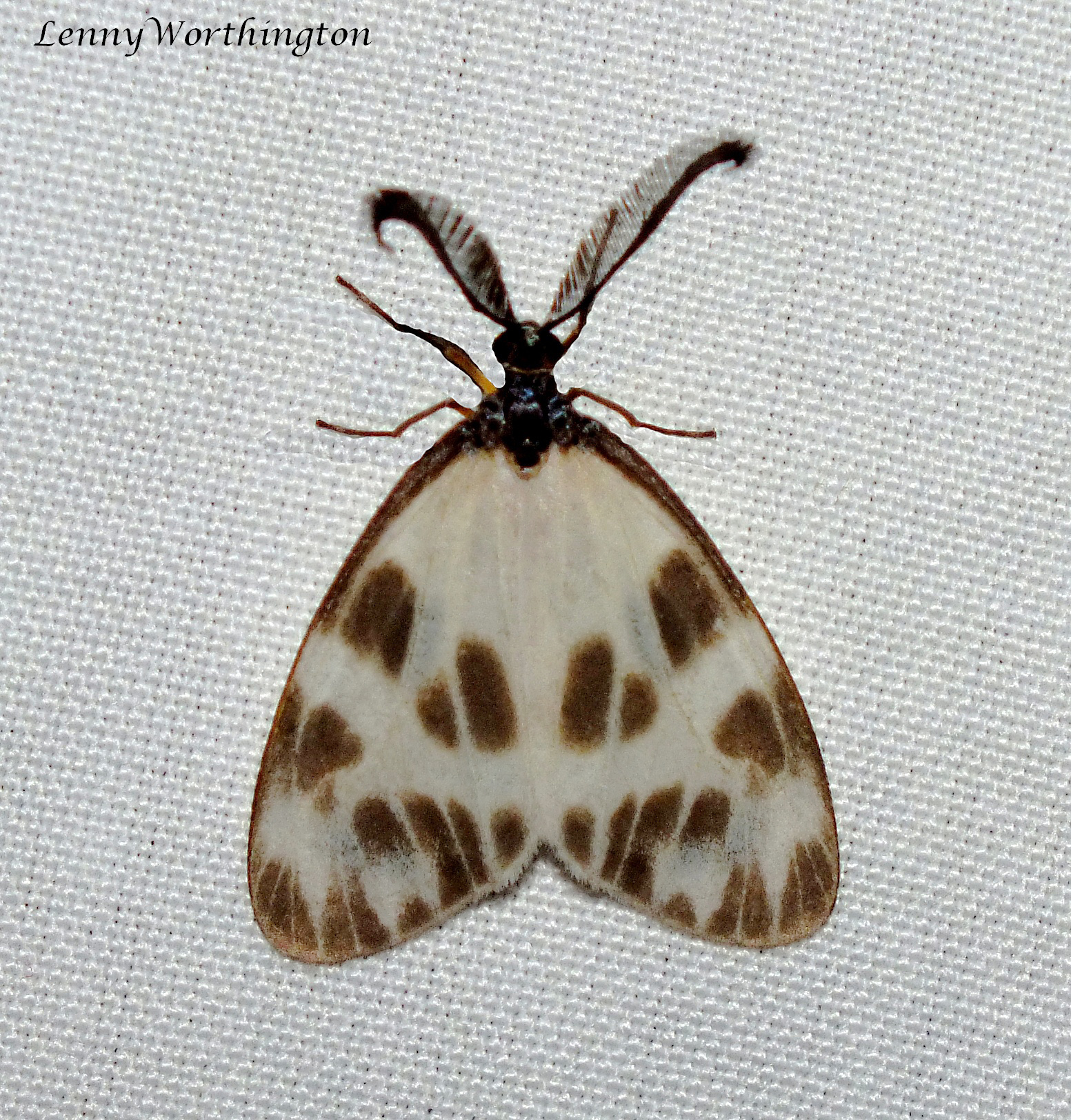

Scientific classification
- Kingdom: Animalia
- Phylum: Arthropoda
- Clade: Pancrustacea
- Class: Insecta
- Order: Lepidoptera
- Family: Zygaenidae
- Genus: Corma
- Species: C. zenotia

Binomial name
- Corma zenotia Doubleday, 1847

= Corma zenotia =

Species of zygaenid moth

Corma zenotia is a species of moth in the family Zygaenidae.
