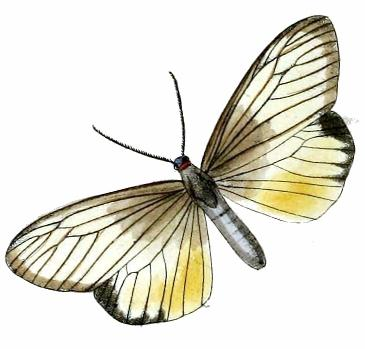

Scientific classification
- Domain: Eukaryota
- Kingdom: Animalia
- Phylum: Arthropoda
- Class: Insecta
- Order: Lepidoptera
- Family: Zygaenidae
- Subfamily: Chalcosiinae
- Genus: Milleria; Herrich-Schäffer, 1853

= Milleria (moth) =

Genus of moths

Milleria is a genus of moths of the family Zygaenidae. Some sources erroneously suggested the name was a junior homonym, but the senior name was a nomen nudum, leaving the moth name as available and valid.

== Species ==
- Milleria adalifa
- Milleria adalifoides
- Milleria dualis
- Milleria hamiltoni
- Milleria lingnami
- Milleria rehfousi
