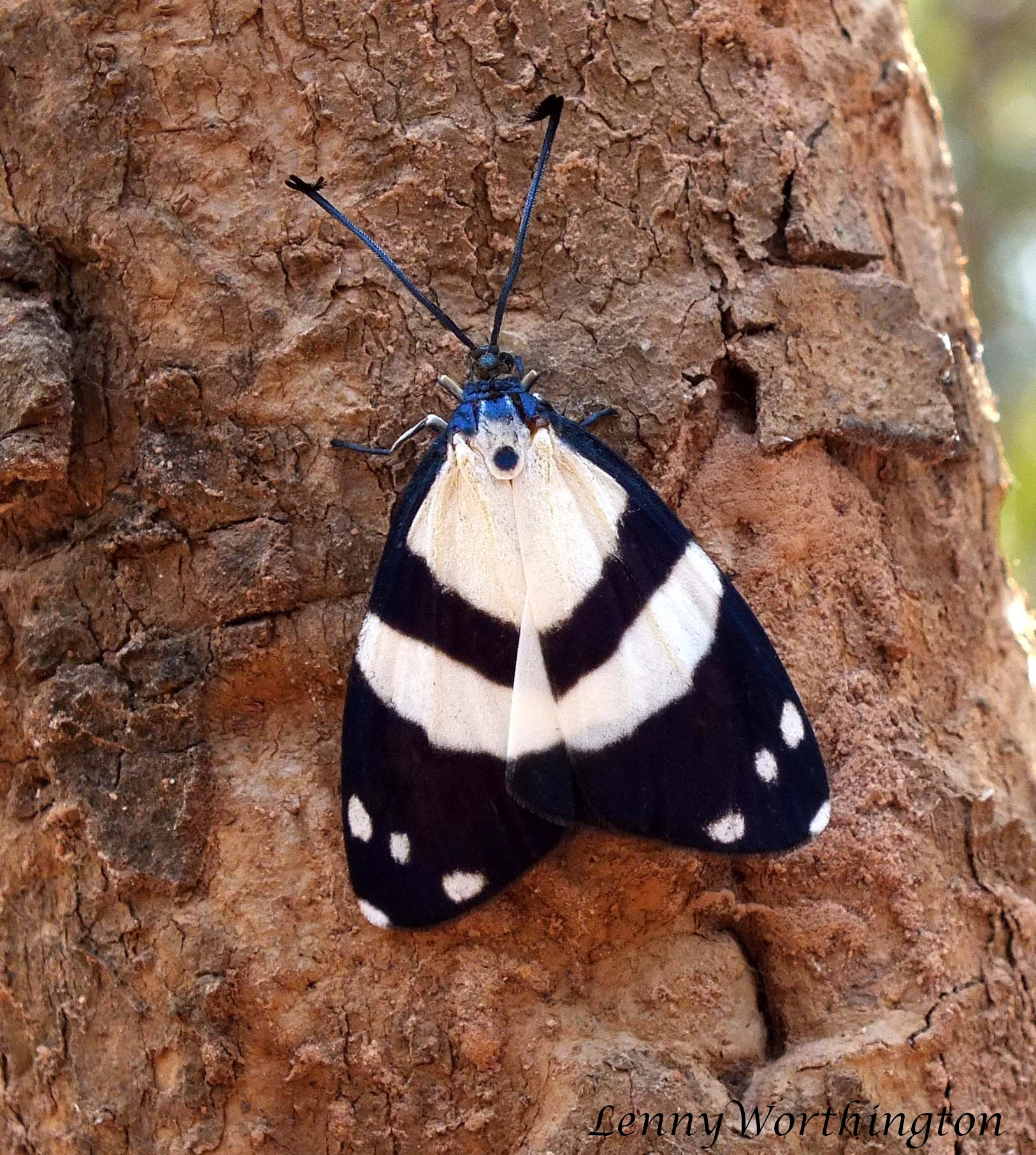
- Corma zelica

Scientific classification
- Kingdom: Animalia
- Phylum: Arthropoda
- Class: Insecta
- Order: Lepidoptera
- Family: Zygaenidae
- Subfamily: Chalcosiinae
- Genus: Corma; Walker, 1865

= Corma =

Genus of moths

Corma is a genus of moths of the Zygaenidae family.

== Species ==
There are five accepted species in this genus:

- Corma fragilis (Walker, 1862)
- Corma maculata Hampson, 1892
- Corma tamosi Lemée, 1950
- Corma zelica (Doubleday, 1847)
- Corma zenotia (Doubleday, 1847)
