= Milleria dualis =

Scientific classification
- Domain: Eukaryota
- Kingdom: Animalia
- Phylum: Arthropoda
- Class: Insecta
- Order: Lepidoptera
- Family: Zygaenidae
- Genus: Milleria
- Species: M. dualis

Binomial name
- Milleria dualis Hering, 1941

Species of moth

Milleria dualis is a moth in the family Zygaenidae. It is found in India (the Khasia Hills).
