= Cyclosia distanti =

Scientific classification
- Domain: Eukaryota
- Kingdom: Animalia
- Phylum: Arthropoda
- Class: Insecta
- Order: Lepidoptera
- Family: Zygaenidae
- Genus: Cyclosia
- Species: C. distanti

Binomial name
- Cyclosia distanti (Druce, 1891)

Synonyms
- Epyrgis distanti Druce, 1891

Species of moth

Cyclosia distanti is a moth in the family Zygaenidae. It was described by Druce in 1891. It is found in Malacca.
