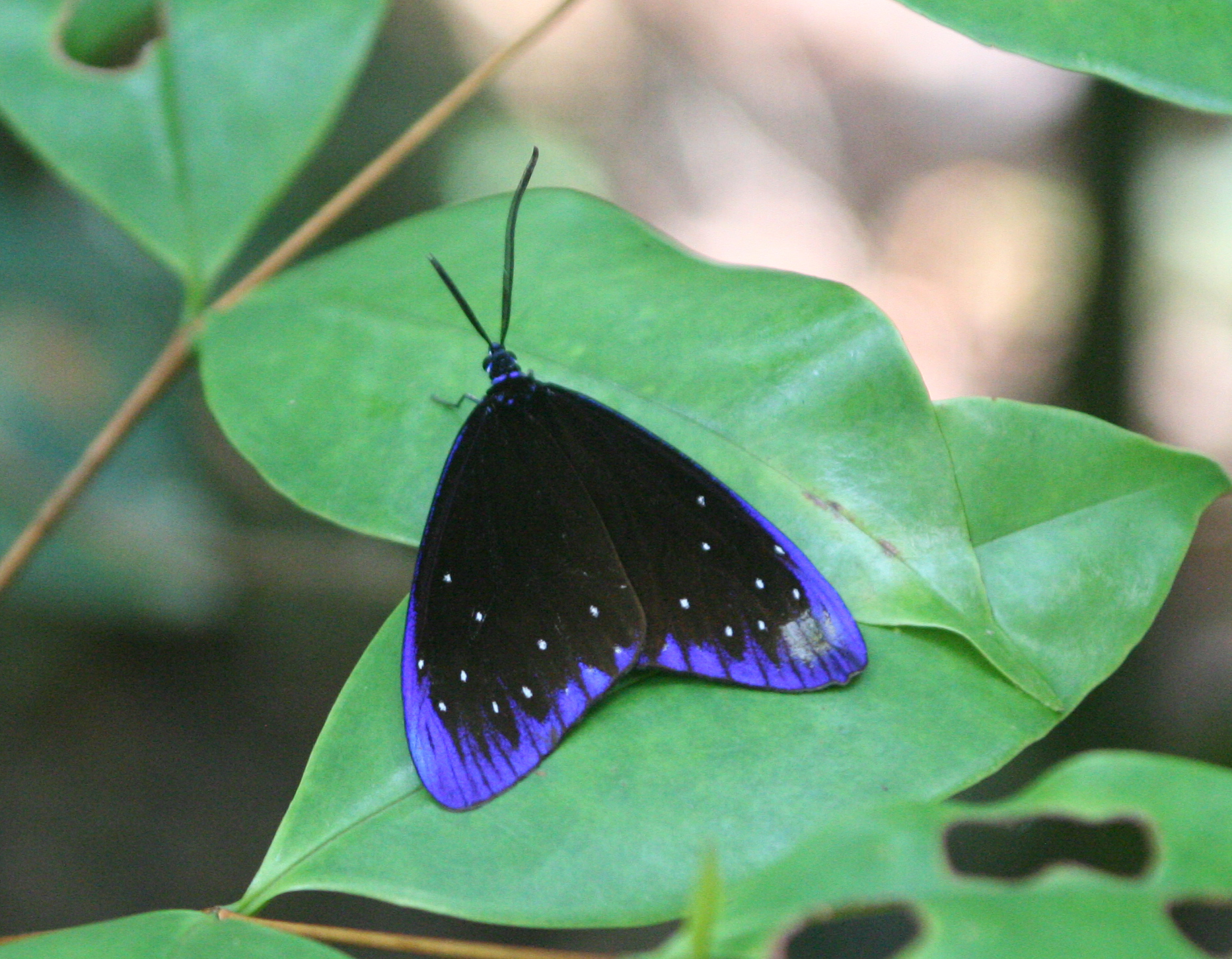

Scientific classification
- Domain: Eukaryota
- Kingdom: Animalia
- Phylum: Arthropoda
- Class: Insecta
- Order: Lepidoptera
- Family: Zygaenidae
- Genus: Cyclosia
- Species: C. midamia

Binomial name
- Cyclosia midamia (Herrich-Schäffer, [1853])

Synonyms
- Epyrgis midama Herrich-Schäffer, [1853]; Amesia midama; Callamesia midama; Chalcosia midama; Amesia juvenis Butler, 1879; Amesia striata Druce, 1891; Amesia trepsichrois Butler, 1883; Isbarta extrema Grünberg, 1908; Epyrgis hormenia Herrich-Schäffer, 1853; Cyclosia latistriga Talbot, 1929; Isbarta maassi Grünberg, 1908; Cyclosia spilophila Herrich-Schäffer, [1853]; Amesia stelligera Herrich-Schäffer, [1853]; Cyclosia venusta Herrich-Schäffer, [1853]

= Cyclosia midamia =

Species of moth

Cyclosia midamia is a moth in the family Zygaenidae. It is found in Malaysia and on Borneo. Five subspecies recognized.

It disguises itself to resemble the spotted blue crow. It secretes liquid hydrogen cyanide through their legs as little droplets. Though unlike the butterfly, and so many other insects, Cyclosia midamia produces its own poison made out of the chemical compound cyanide.

== Subspecies ==
- Cyclosia midamia alcathoe Jordan, 1907
- Cyclosia midamia dolosa Jordan, 1907 (Java)
- Cyclosia midamia padangana Jordan, 1907 (Sumatra)
- Cyclosia midamia submaculans Walker, 1859 (Singapore)
- Cyclosia midamia trepsichrois Butler, 1883 (Nias)
