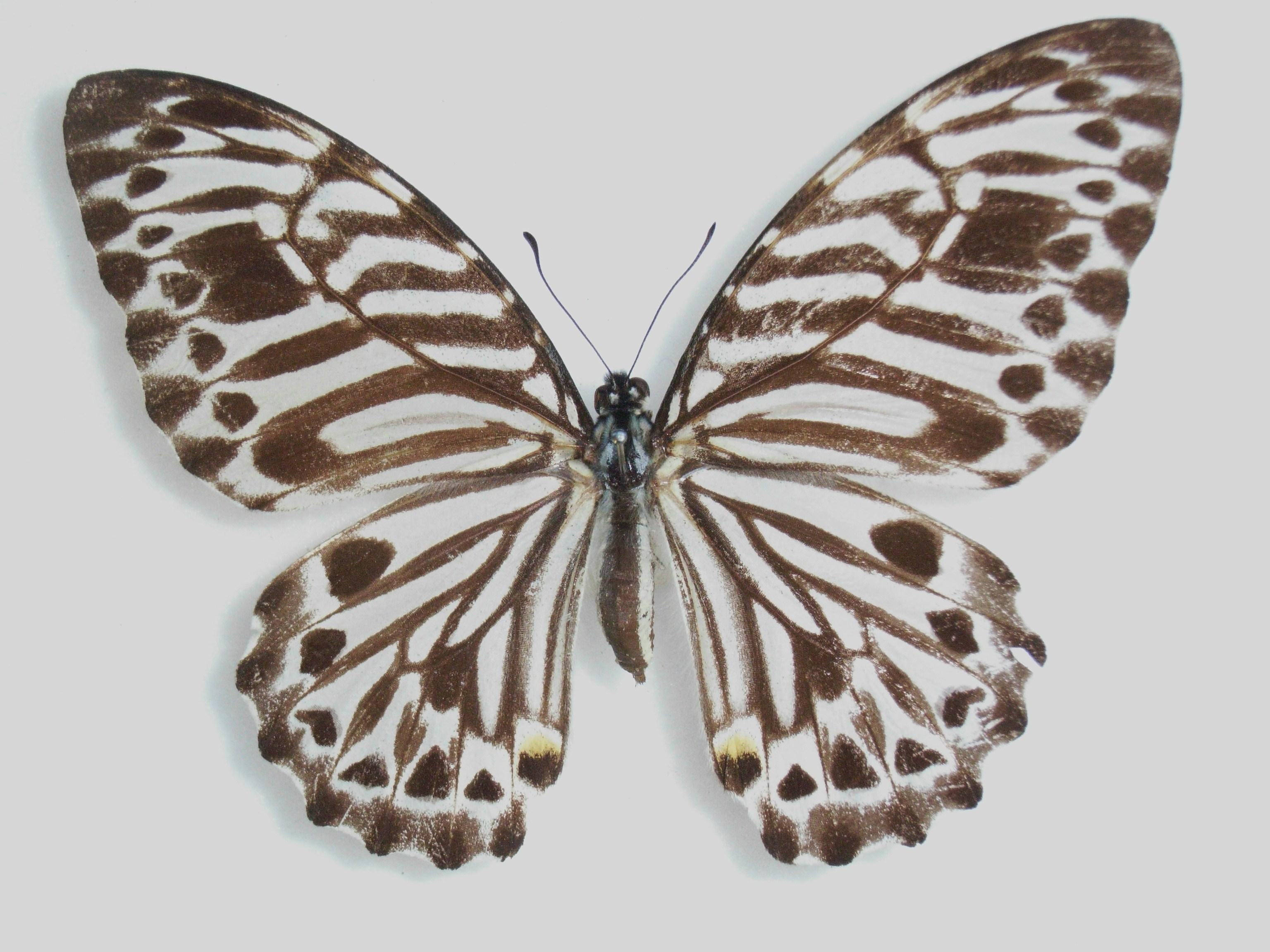
- Female
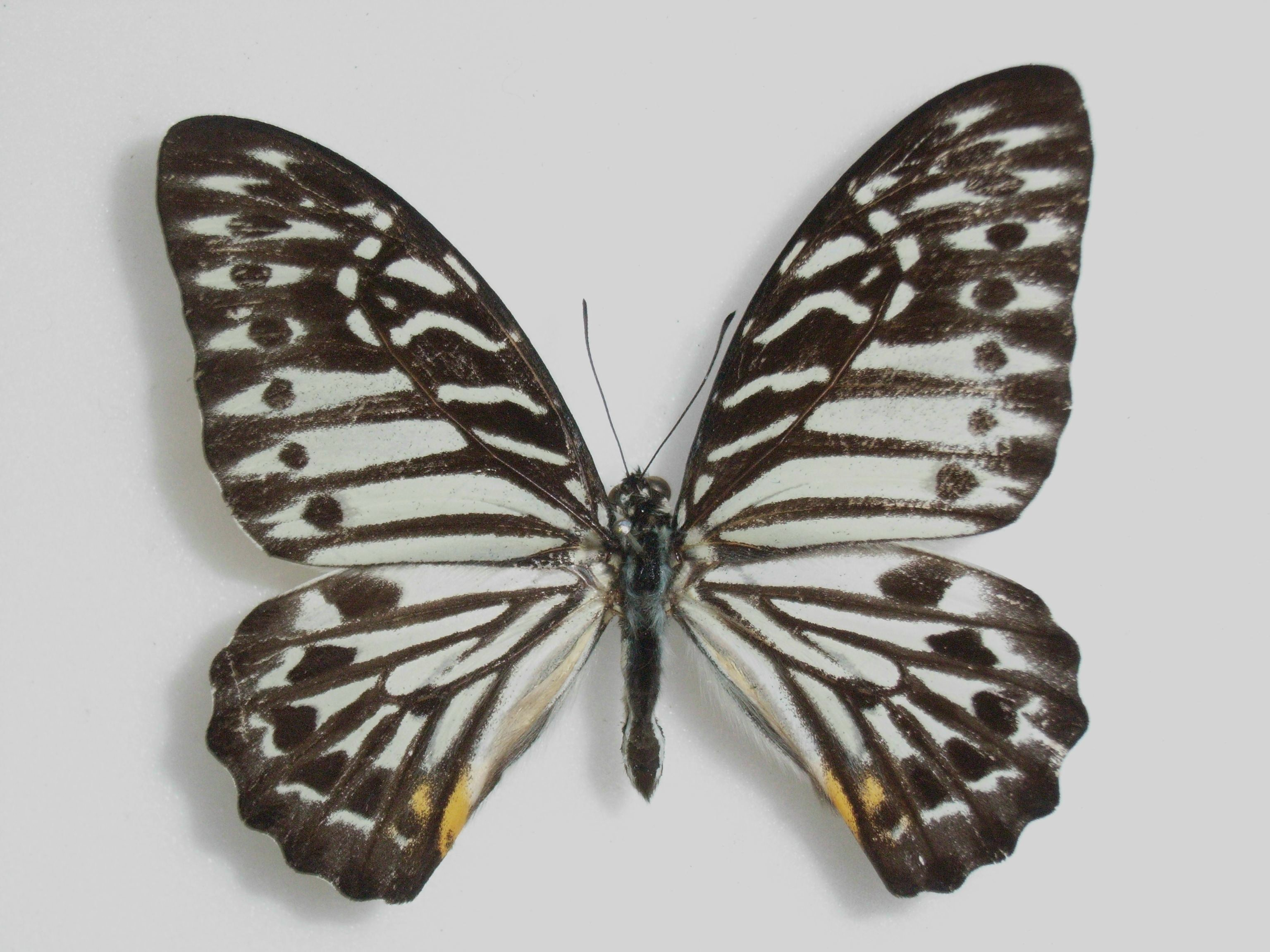
- Male

Scientific classification
- Kingdom: Animalia
- Phylum: Arthropoda
- Clade: Pancrustacea
- Class: Insecta
- Order: Lepidoptera
- Family: Papilionidae
- Genus: Graphium
- Species: G. delessertii

Binomial name
- Graphium delessertii (Guérin-Méneville, 1839)

Synonyms
- Papilio delessertii Guérin-Méneville, 1839; Paranticopsis delessertii; Arisbe delesserti; Papilio catoris Grose-Smith, 1892; Papilio labienus Fruhstorfer, 1909; Papilio sacerdotalis Fruhstorfer, 1909; Papilio delessertii ab. albinistica Bryk, 1930; Papilio laodocus de Haan, 1840; Papilio melanides Erichson, 1843; Papilio dehaani Wallace, 1865

= Graphium delessertii =

Species of butterfly

Graphium delessertii, the Malayan zebra, is a butterfly of the family Papilionidae (swallowtails). It is found in Southeast Asia. The rare female resembles Ideopsis gaura. Despite the rarity of females Graphium delessertii is a common species, although threatened by deforestation in Java.

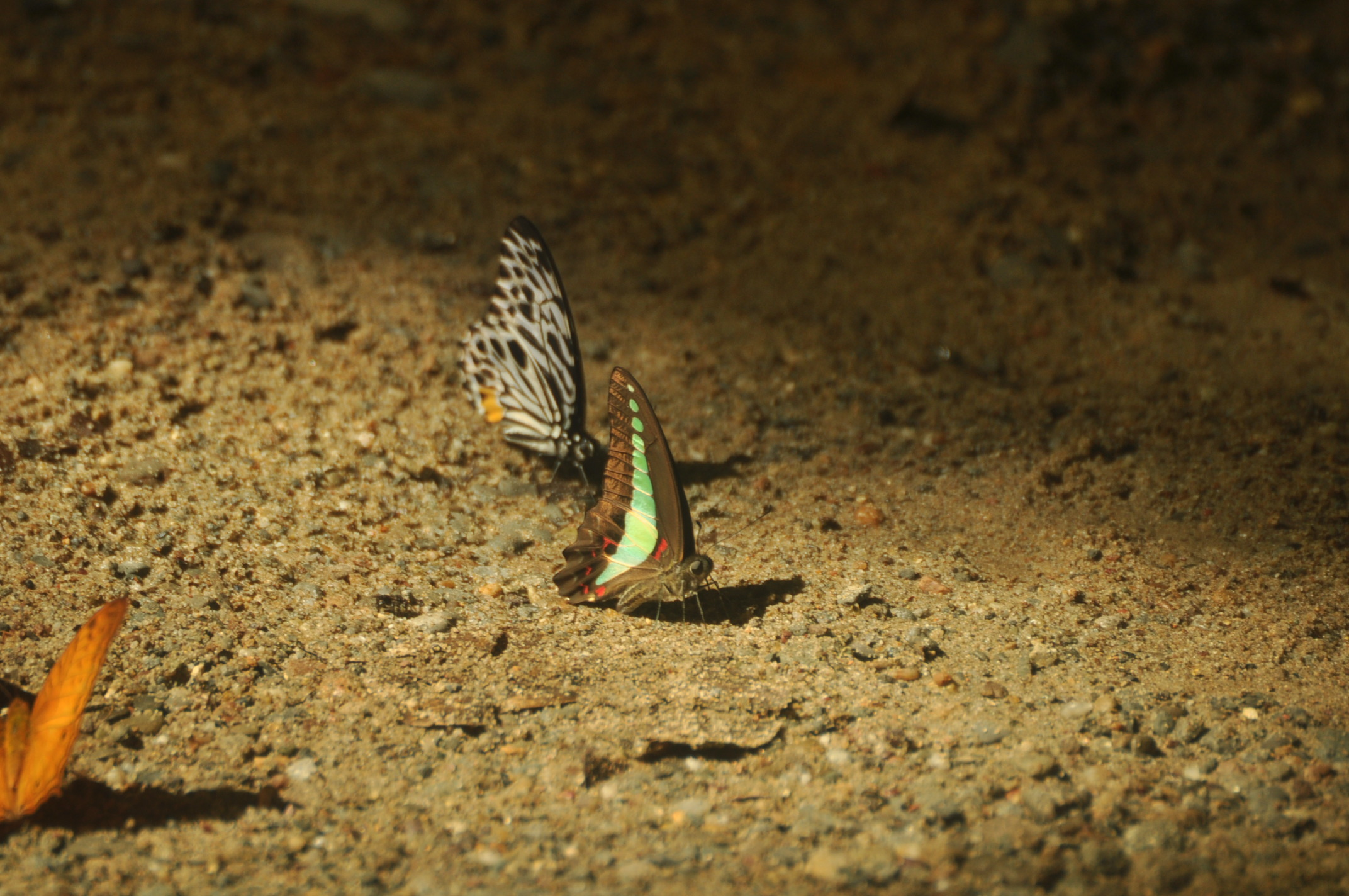
Graphium delessertii with Graphium sarpedon

== Subspecies ==
- Graphium delessertii delessertii (Peninsular Malaya, Sumatra, Java, Bangka, Natuna, Borneo)
- Graphium delessertii hyalinus (Fruhstorfer, 1901) (Nias)
- Graphium delessertii palawanus (Staudinger, 1889) (Philippines: Palawan, Balabac)

See also

- Graphium delessertii fulvus (Page & Treadaway, 2011) (Indonesia: Pulau Karimata)
- Graphium delessertii verbigenus (Fruhstorfer, 1911) (Malaysia: Bangue/Banggi Island)
