= Corma fragilis =

Scientific classification
- Kingdom: Animalia
- Phylum: Arthropoda
- Clade: Pancrustacea
- Class: Insecta
- Order: Lepidoptera
- Family: Zygaenidae
- Genus: Corma
- Species: C. fragilis

Binomial name
- Corma fragilis (Walker, 1862)

Synonyms
- Chalcosia fragilis Walker, 1862; Corma obscurata Walker, [1865]

Species of moth

Corma fragilis is a species of moth in the family Zygaenidae. It is known from Sumatra and Borneo.
