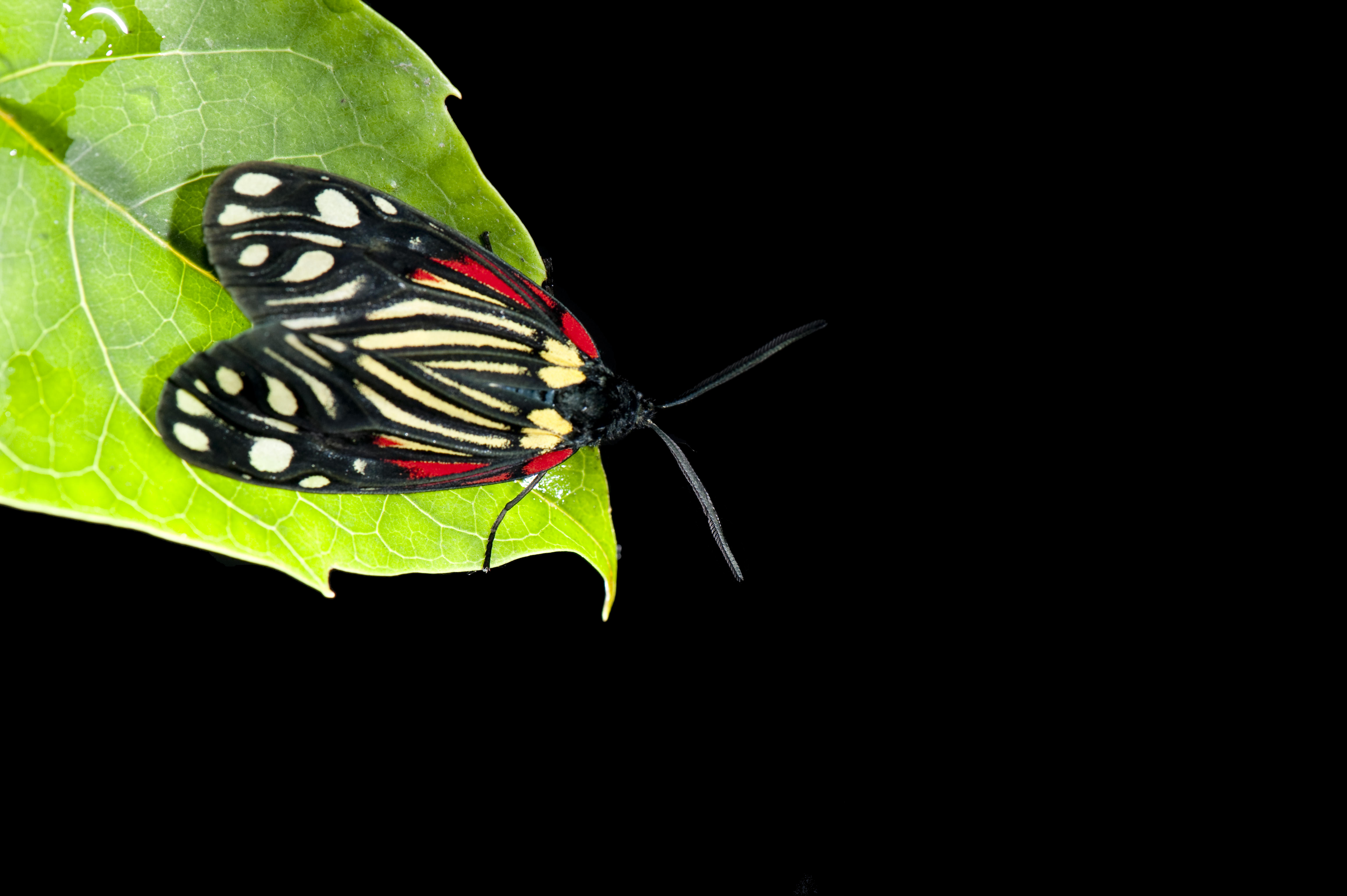
- Campylotes maculosa

Scientific classification
- Kingdom: Animalia
- Phylum: Arthropoda
- Class: Insecta
- Order: Lepidoptera
- Family: Zygaenidae
- Genus: Campylotes; Westwood, 1840

= Campylotes =

Genus of moths

Campylotes is a genus of day-flying moths of the family Zygaenidae. The genus was erected by John O. Westwood in 1840.

== Species ==
Species accepted within Campylotes:

- Campylotes atkinsoni Moore, 1879
- Campylotes burmana Hampson, 1919
- Campylotes desgodinsi Oberthür, 1884
  - Campylotes desgodinsi ssp. splendida Elwes, 1890
- Campylotes histrionicus Westwood, 1939
- Campylotes kotzschi Röber, 1926
- Campylotes maculosa Wileman, 1910
- Campylotes minima Oberthür, 1894
- Campylotes philomena Oberthür, 1923
- Campylotes pratti Leech, 1890
- Campylotes romanovi Leech, 1898
- Campylotes sikkimensis Elwes, 1890
- Campylotes wernickei Röber, 1925
