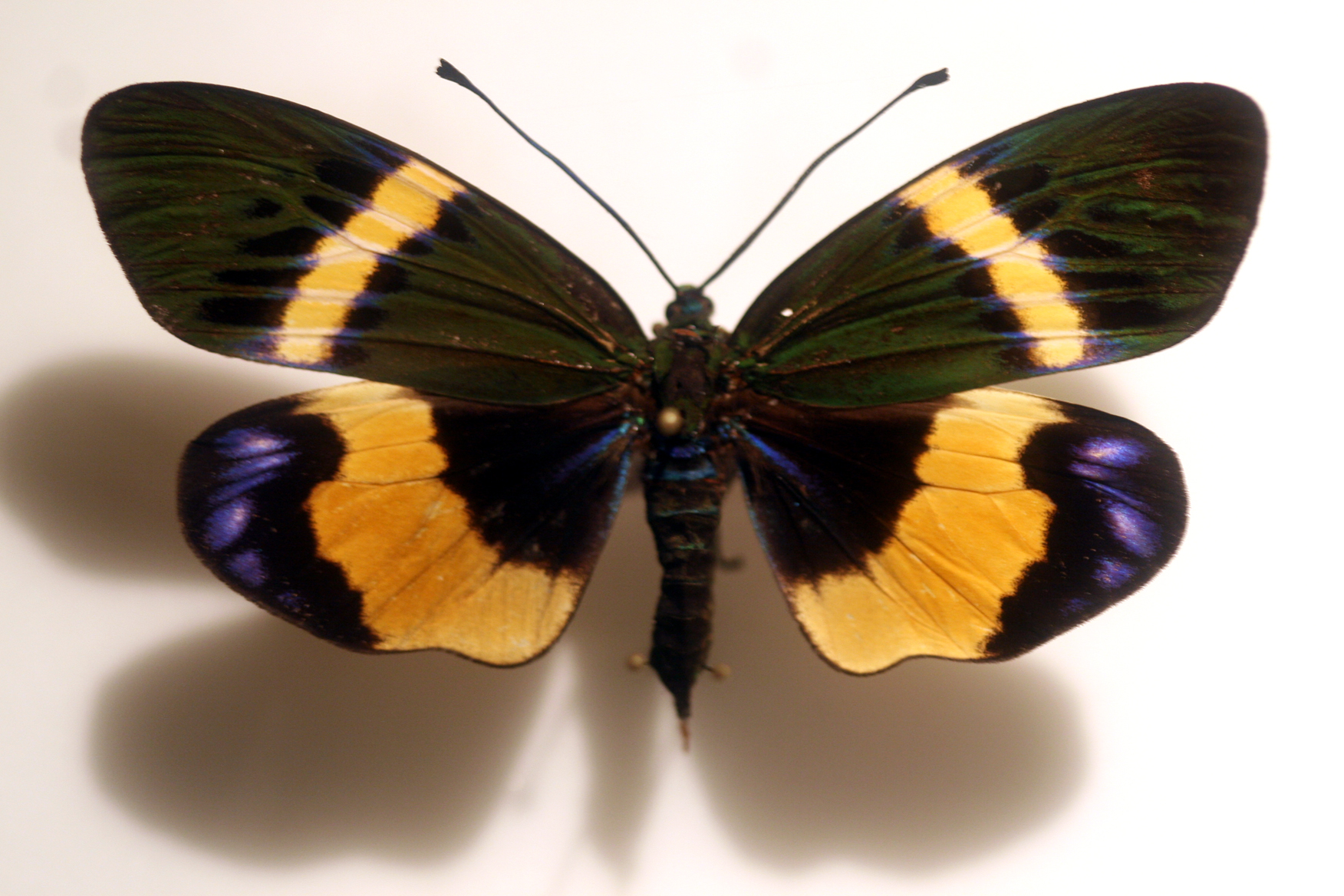

Scientific classification
- Kingdom: Animalia
- Phylum: Arthropoda
- Class: Insecta
- Order: Lepidoptera
- Family: Zygaenidae
- Genus: Eterusia
- Species: E. repleta

Binomial name
- Eterusia repleta Walker, 1864

Synonyms
- Eterusia alompra; Eterusia urania

= Eterusia repleta =

Species of moth

Eterusia repleta is a moth of the family Zygaenidae. It is found in Thailand and India.

The wingspan is about 78 mm.
