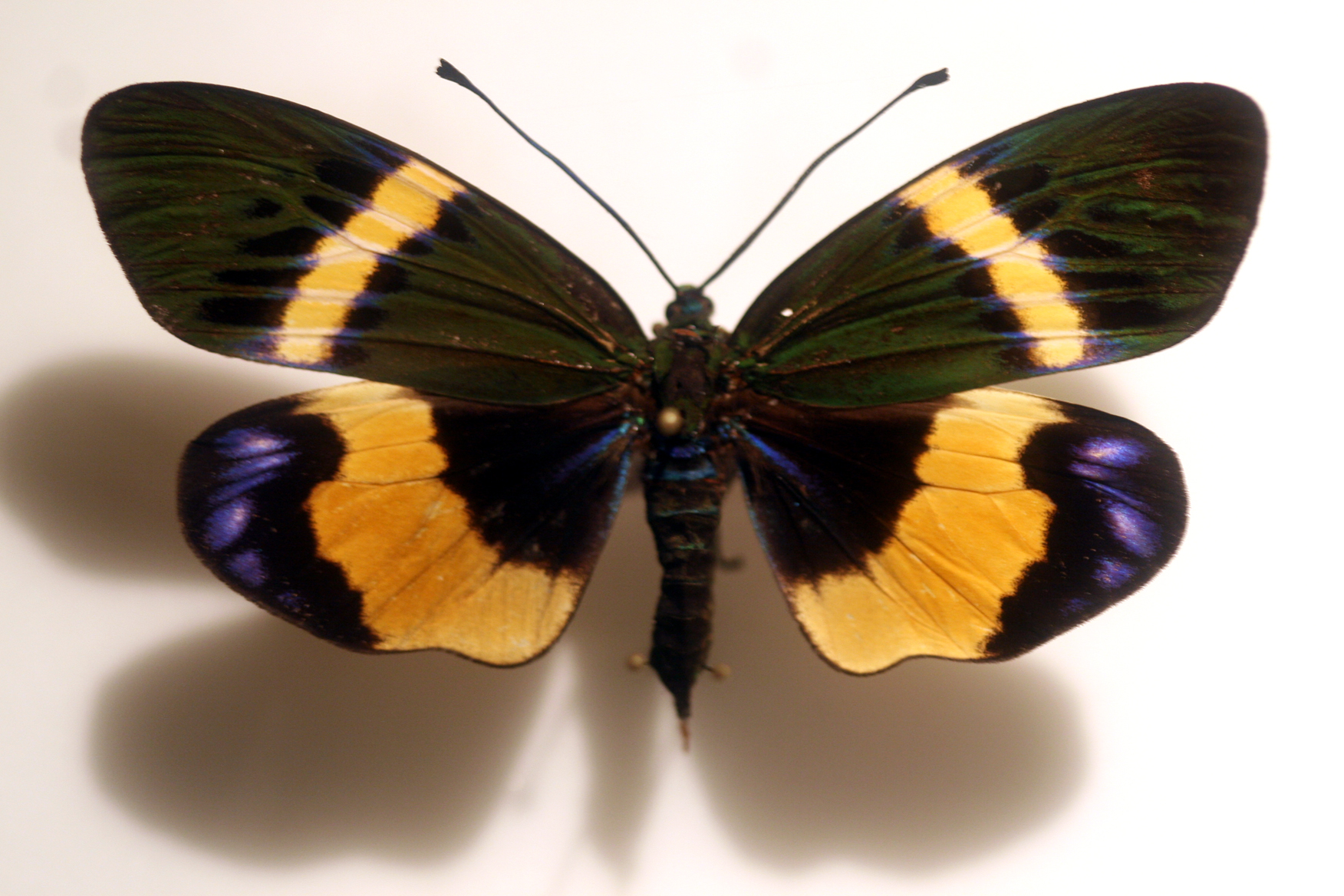
- Eterusia repleta

Scientific classification
- Domain: Eukaryota
- Kingdom: Animalia
- Phylum: Arthropoda
- Class: Insecta
- Order: Lepidoptera
- Family: Zygaenidae
- Subfamily: Chalcosiinae
- Genus: Eterusia; Hope, 1841

= Eterusia =

Genus of moths

Eterusia is a genus of moths of the family Zygaenidae.

== Species ==
- Eterusia aedea
- Eterusia alompra
- Eterusia angustifascia
- Eterusia culoti
- Eterusia dubernardi
- Eterusia fasciata
- Eterusia formosibia
- Eterusia joiceyi
- Eterusia lacreuzei
- Eterusia lativitta
- Eterusia ni
- Eterusia obscurascens
- Eterusia proprimarginata
- Eterusia raja
- Eterusia repleta
- Eterusia scintillans
- Eterusia subcyanea
- Eterusia sublutea
- Eterusia subnigra
- Eterusia sulphurea
- Eterusia taiwana
- Eterusia toxopei
- Eterusia tricolor
- Eterusia trimacula
- Eterusia urania
- Eterusia venus
- Eterusia watanabei
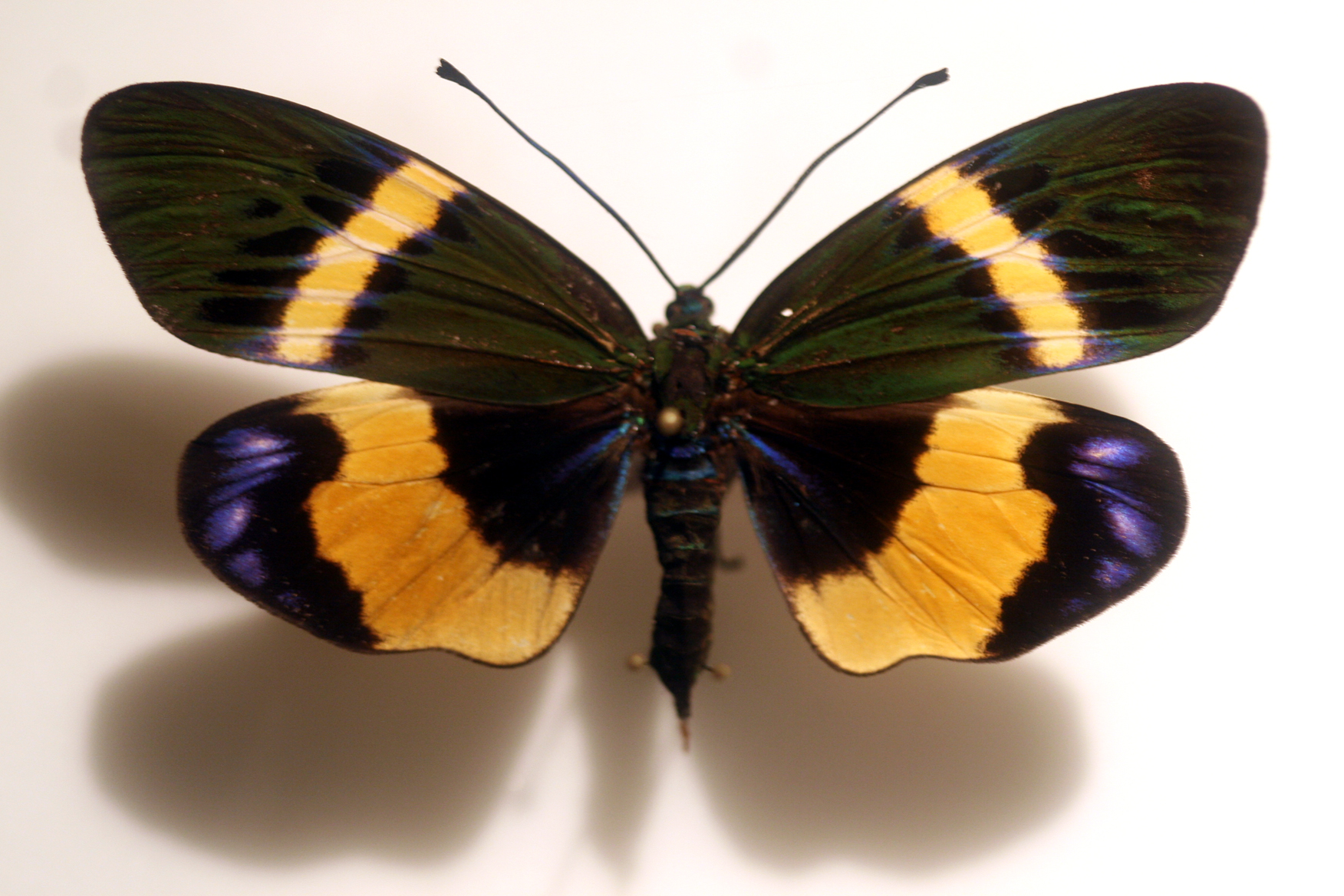

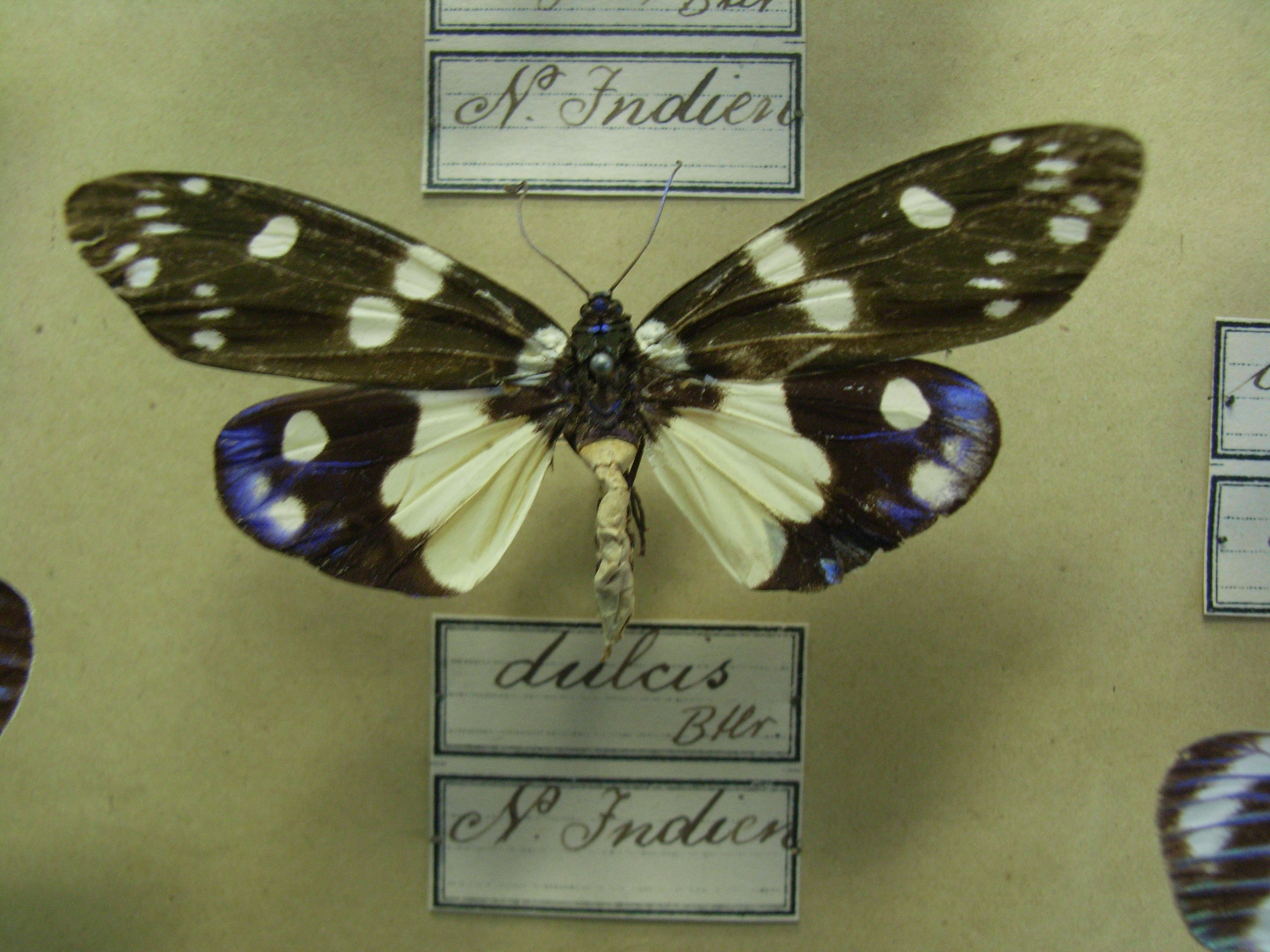

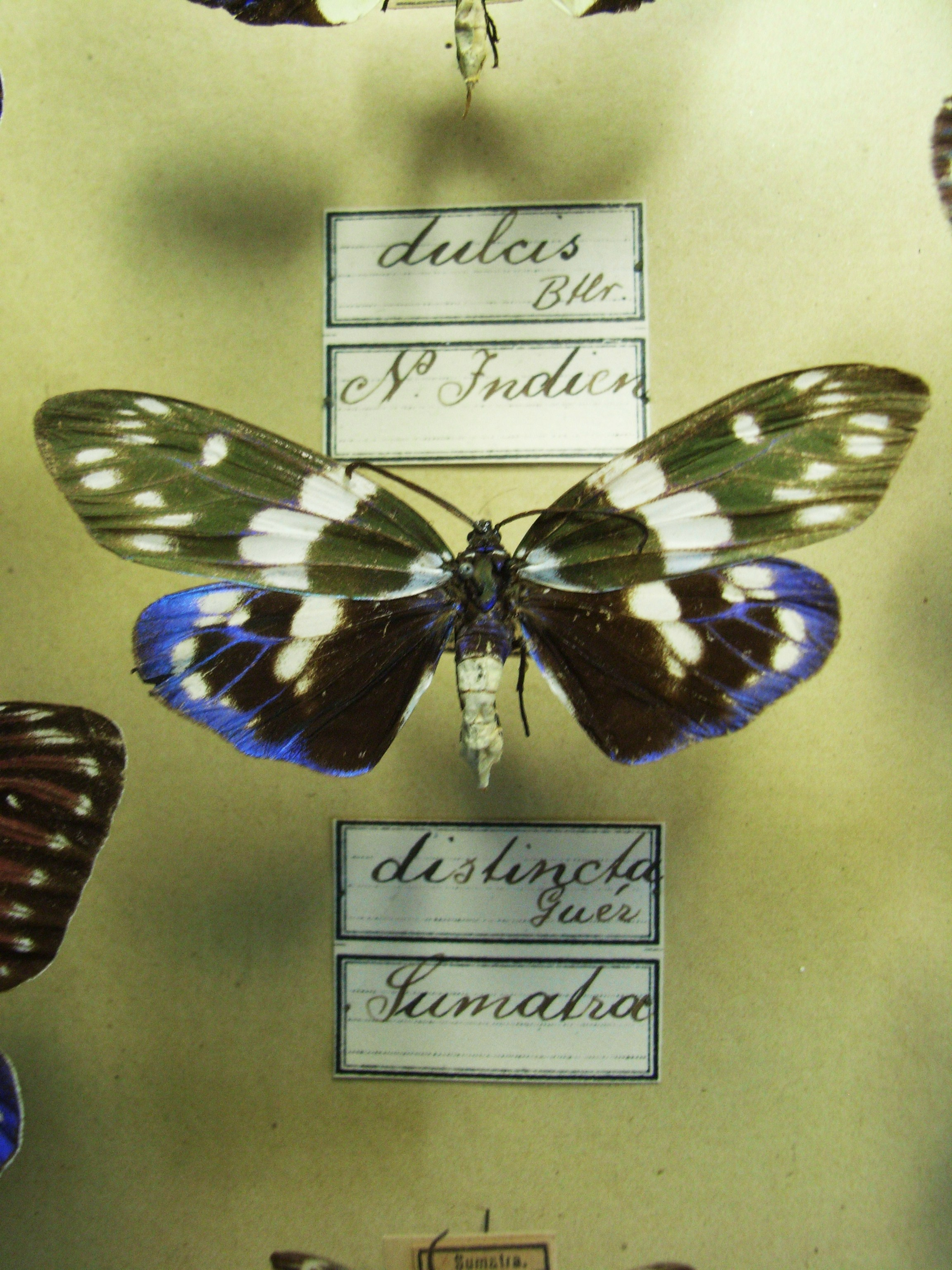
