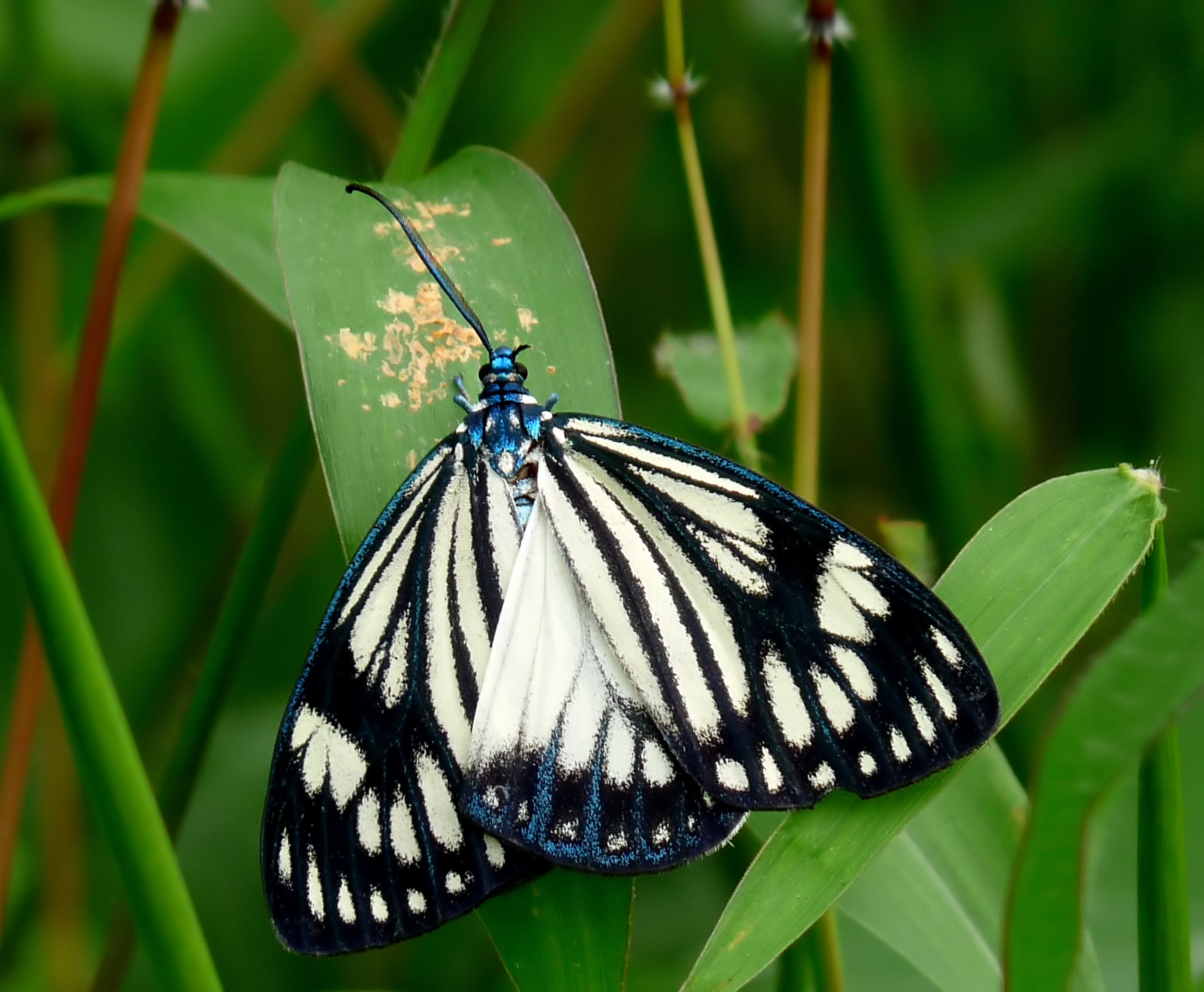

Scientific classification
- Kingdom: Animalia
- Phylum: Arthropoda
- Clade: Pancrustacea
- Class: Insecta
- Order: Lepidoptera
- Family: Zygaenidae
- Subfamily: Chalcosiinae
- Genus: Cyclosia; Hübner, 1820

Synonyms
- Klaboana Moore, 1879

= Cyclosia =

Genus of moths

Cyclosia is a genus of zygaenid moth that has a mimicry complex with the milkweed butterfly.

== Selected species ==
- Cyclosia distanti (Druce, 1891)
- Cyclosia midamia (Herrich-Schäffer, [1853])
- Cyclosia panthona (Stoll, [1780])
- Cyclosia papilionaris (Drury, 1773)
- Cyclosia pieridoides Walker, 1862
