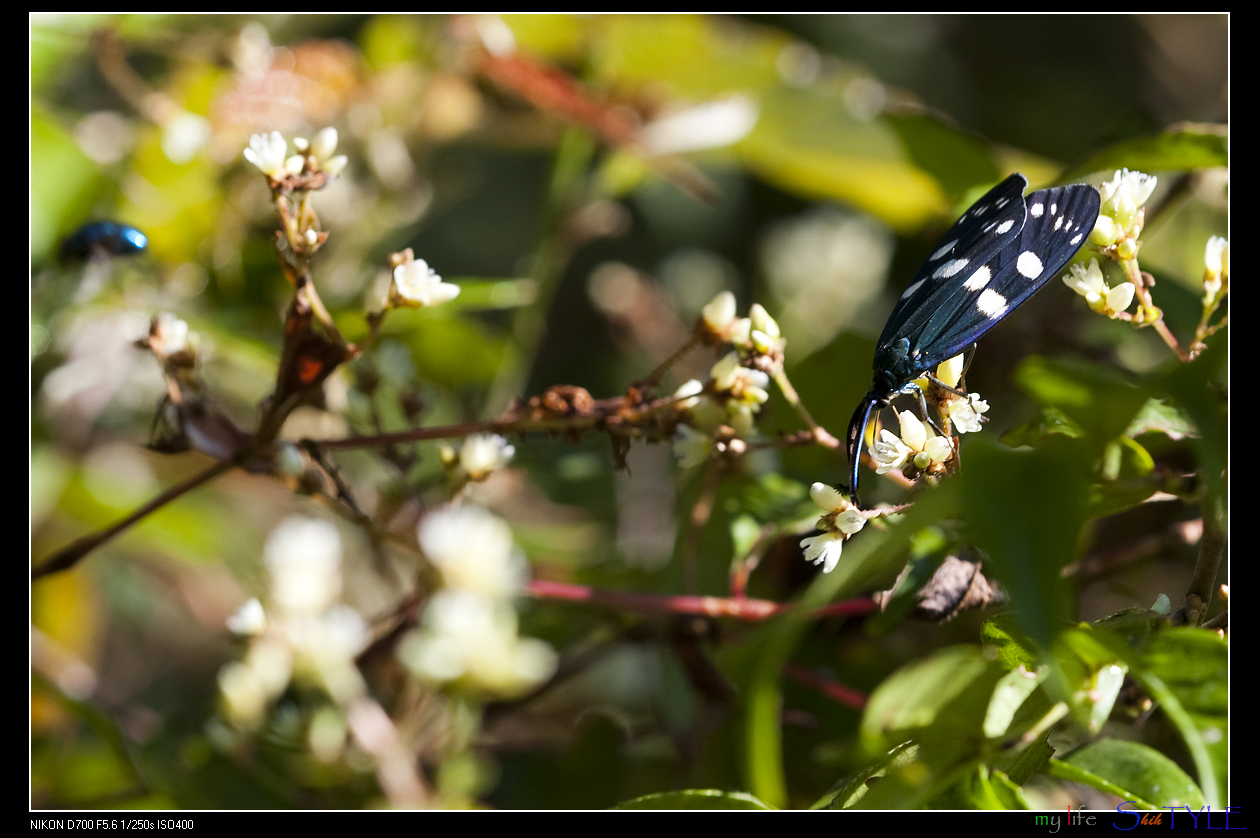

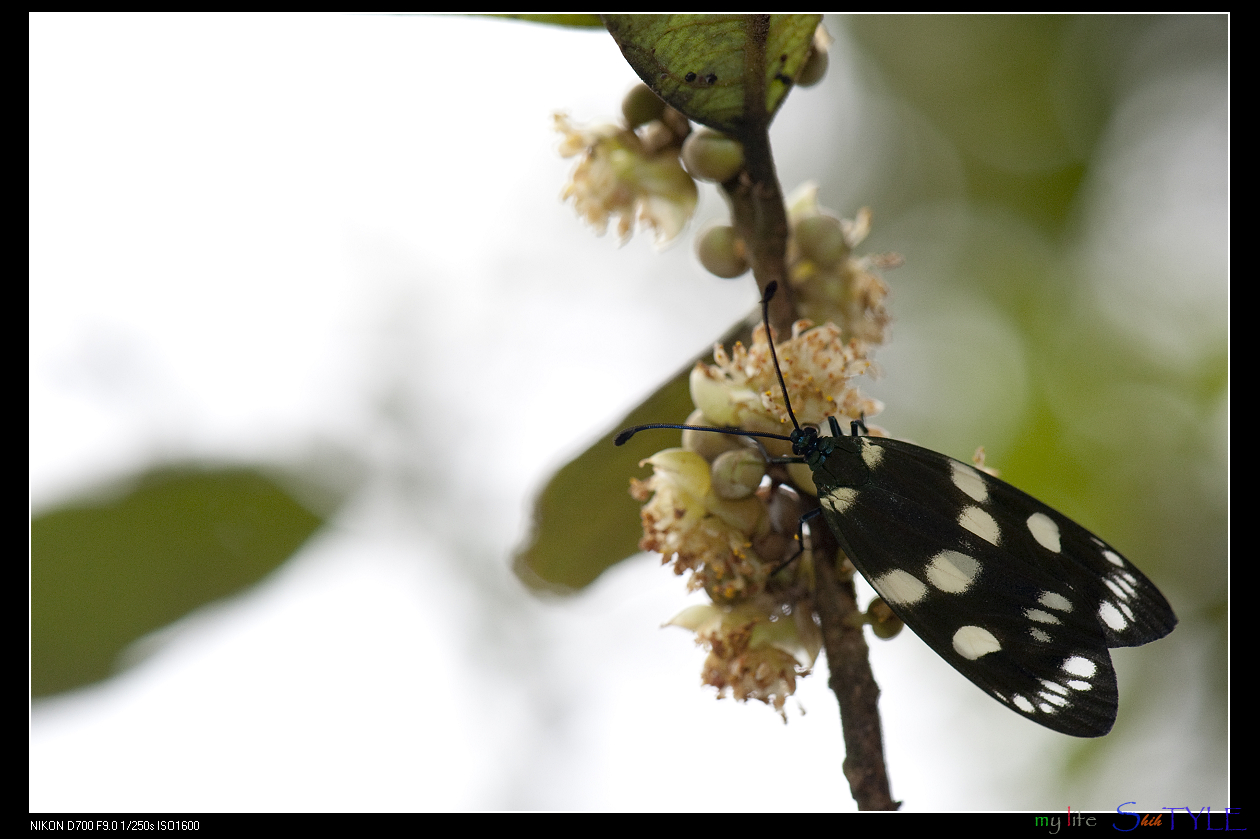

Scientific classification
- Kingdom: Animalia
- Phylum: Arthropoda
- Class: Insecta
- Order: Lepidoptera
- Family: Zygaenidae
- Genus: Eterusia
- Species: E. taiwana

Binomial name
- Eterusia taiwana (Wileman, 1911)

Synonyms
- Heterusia taiwana Wileman, 1911

= Eterusia taiwana =

Species of moth

Eterusia taiwana is a moth of the family Zygaenidae. It is found in Taiwan.

The wingspan is 58–60 mm (2.3–2.4 in).
