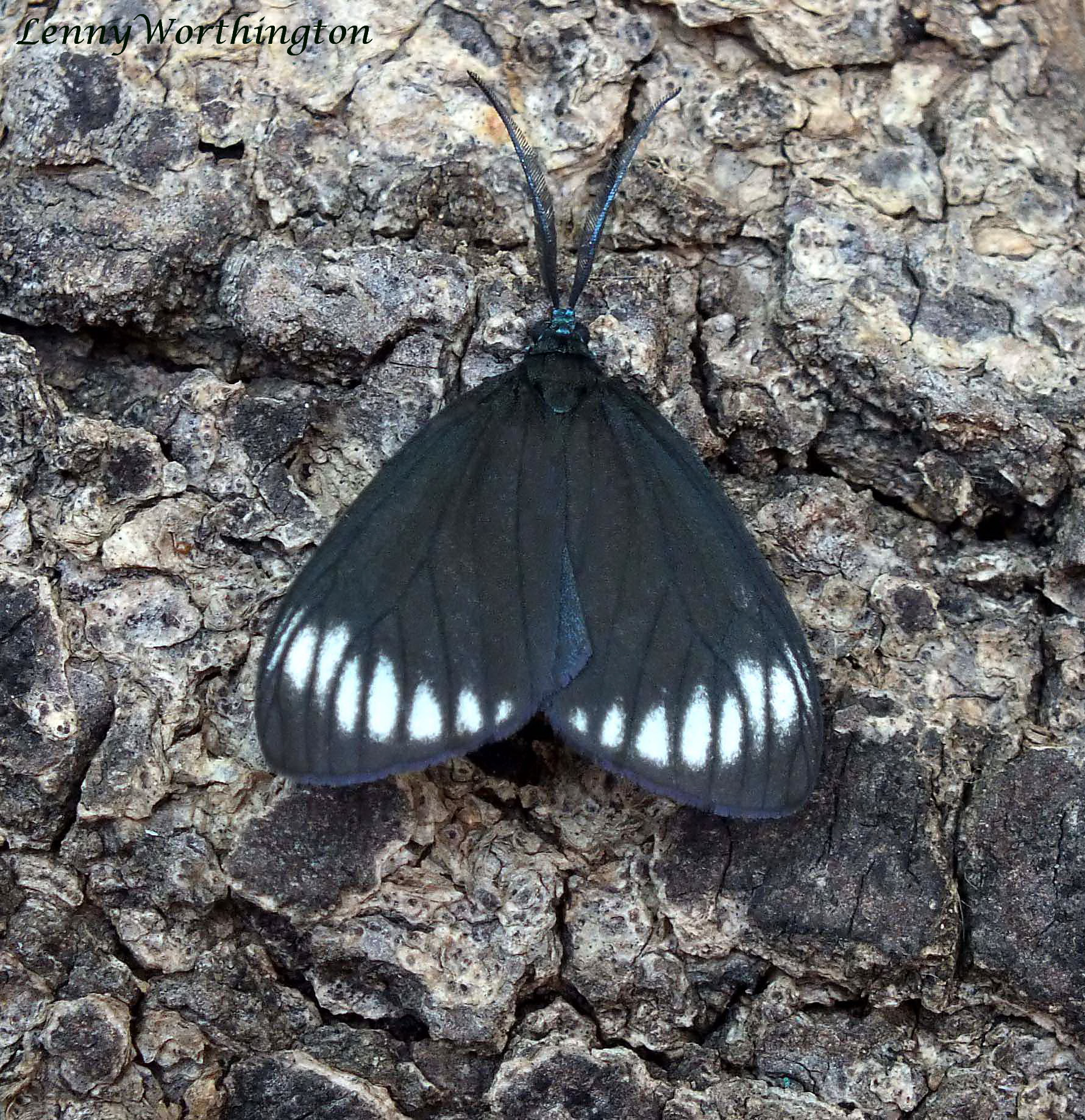

Scientific classification
- Kingdom: Animalia
- Phylum: Arthropoda
- Class: Insecta
- Order: Lepidoptera
- Family: Zygaenidae
- Genus: Cyclosia
- Species: C. panthona

Binomial name
- Cyclosia panthona (Stoll, [1780])

Synonyms
- Phalaena panthona Stoll, [1780]

= Cyclosia panthona =

Species of moth

Cyclosia panthona is a moth in the family Zygaenidae. It was described by Caspar Stoll in 1780. It is found in China, Hong Kong, India, Sri Lanka, and Myanmar.

== Description ==
Show semi-diurnal habit and rather elongated narrow body. Abdomen entirely blue green. Head, thorax and abdomen without any white markings. Forewing dull brown with a greenish tinge. Hindwing purplish brown. Both wings are with a submarginal series of large white spots in the interspaces, which are furthest from the margin at the apex of the forewing. Larva is pale greenish yellow. The first two and last two somites are reddish. Three lateral and three dorsal series of warts, which are black centered with white color. Pupa is a pale reddish cocoon.
