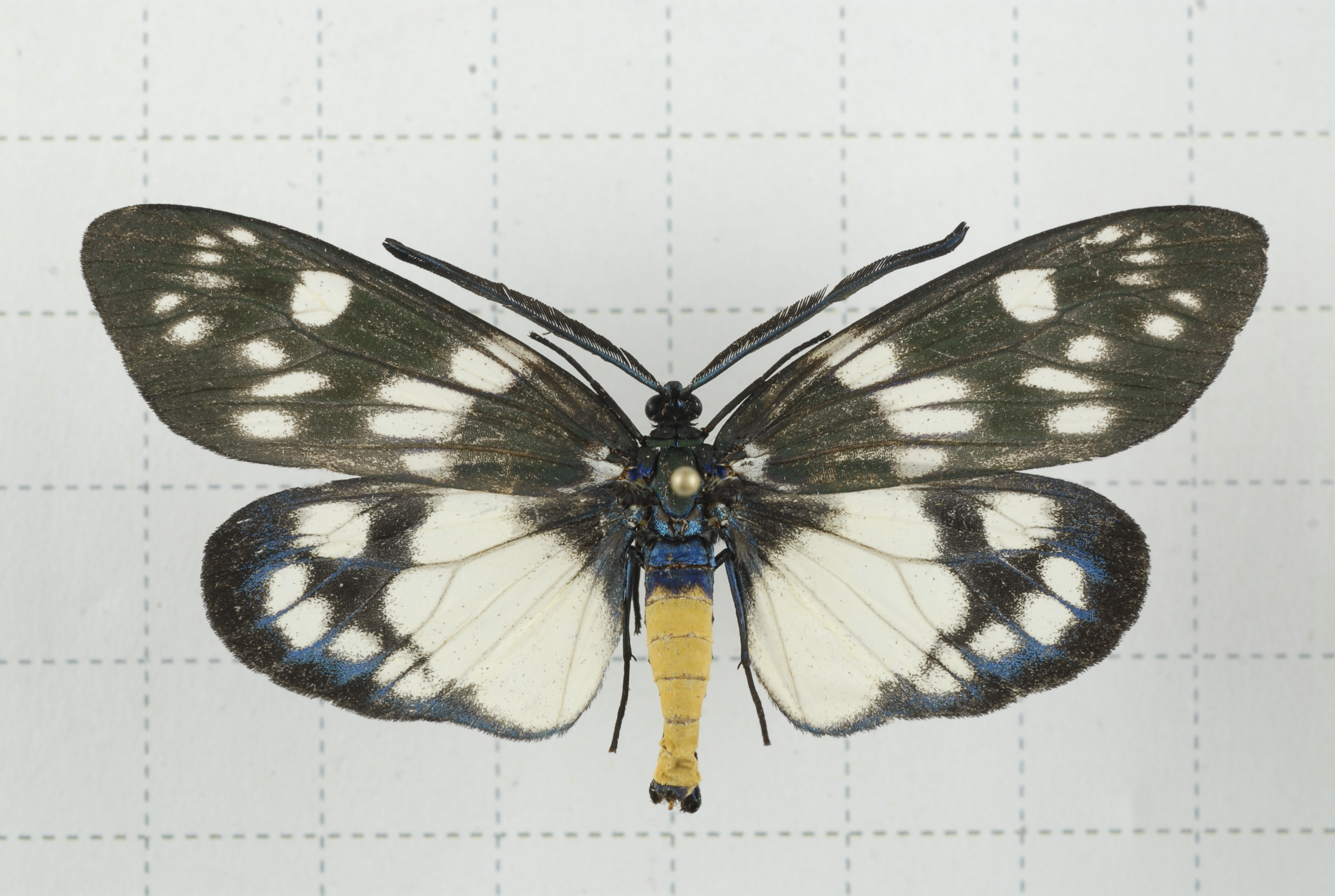
- Adult
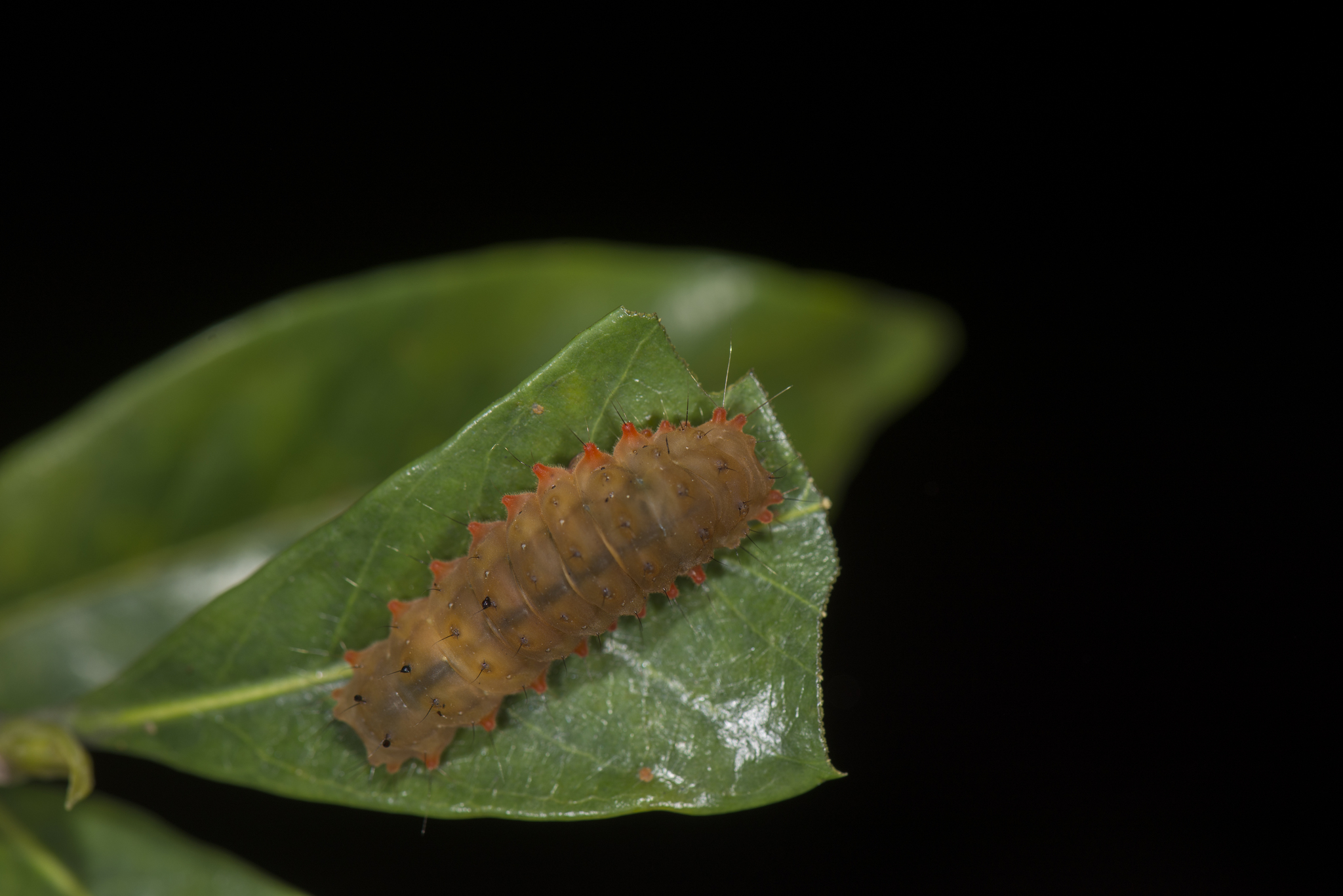
- Larva

Scientific classification
- Kingdom: Animalia
- Phylum: Arthropoda
- Class: Insecta
- Order: Lepidoptera
- Family: Zygaenidae
- Genus: Eterusia
- Species: E. aedea

Binomial name
- Eterusia aedea (Linnaeus, 1763)

Synonyms
- Papilio (Heliconius) aedea Linnaeus, 1763; Heterusia edocla Doubleday, 1844; Heterusia dulcis Butler, 1881; Heterusia signata Möschler, 1872; Eterusia magnifica Butler, 1879; Eterusia adocla form lepcha Jordan, 1907; Heterusia aedea var. septentrionicola C. Felder & R. Felder, 1862; Eterusia aedea ab. postlutea Strand, 1916; Eterusia aedea okinoshimensis Esaki & Inoue, 1956; Eterusia aedea ab. okinawana Matsumura, 1927; Eterusia aedea ishigakiana Inoue, 1982

= Eterusia aedea =

Red slug caterpillar

Species of moth

Eterusia aedea, the red slug caterpillar, is a species of moth in the family Zygaenidae. It was described by Carl Linnaeus in his 1763 Centuria Insectorum. It is found in Sri Lanka, India, Nepal, Taiwan, Japan and China.

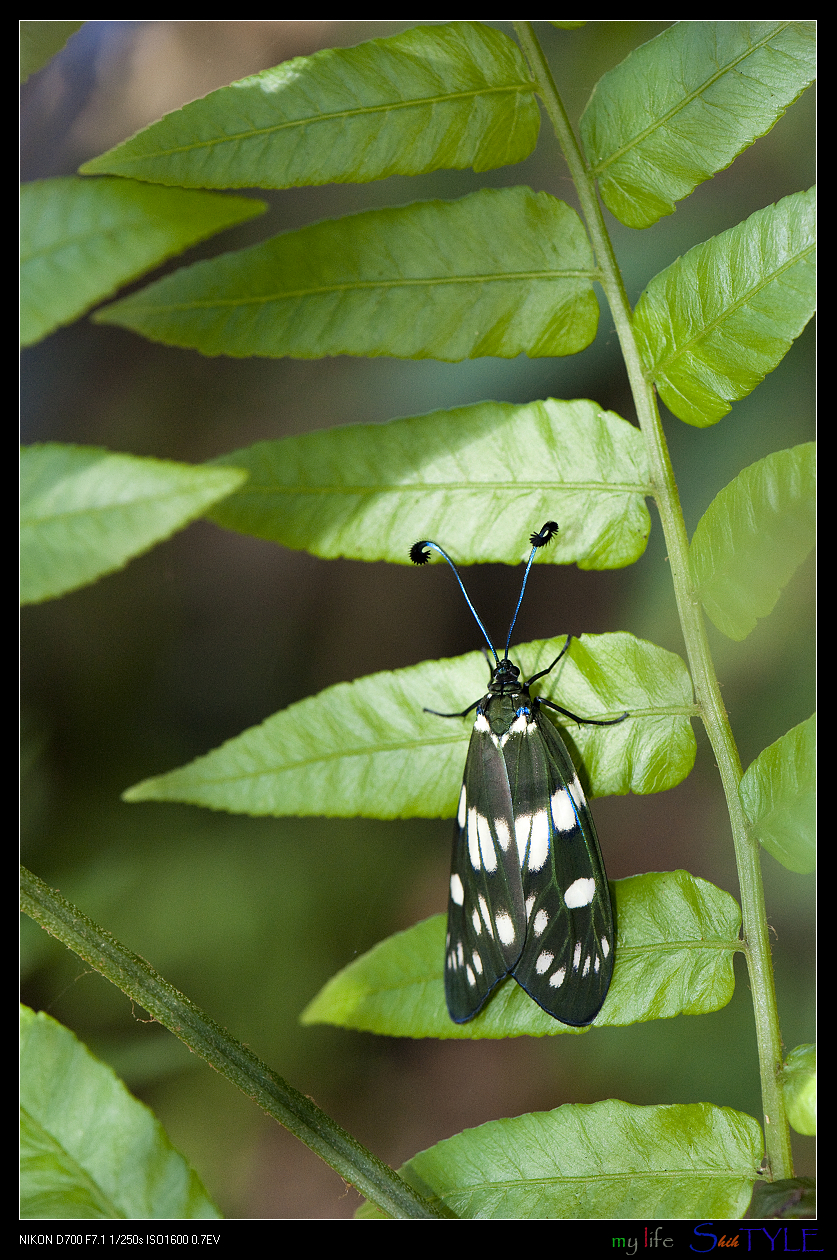

== Description ==
The wingspan is about 50 mm for males and 56 mm for females. They have a semi-diurnal habit and rather elongated narrow body. The first two segments of the abdomen are black, and there are no dorsal bands in the male. The forewings are dark green. The basal black area of the hindwings is larger, reducing the width of the yellow band, which is very pale. The end of the abdomen is black in the male.

== Ecology ==
The larvae have been recorded feeding on a wide range of plants, including Bischofia javanica, Aporosa lindleyana, Aporosa villosa, Cornus florida, Lagerstroemia, Melastoma candidum, Myrica rubra, Sloanea formosana, Rhododendron, Symplocos glauca, Camellia (including C. japonica, C. sasanqua, C. sinensis, C. oleifera), Eurya japonica, Eurya septata, Cleyera japonica and Buddleja. The larvae of subspecies aedea, sinica, formosana, cingala and virescens have been reported as pests on tea.

== Subspecies ==
- Eterusia aedea aedea (Linnaeus, 1763) (Bangladesh, India)
- Eterusia aedea azumai Owada, 2001 (Japan: Kumejima Island)
- Eterusia aedea cingala Moore, 1877 (Sri Lanka)
- Eterusia aedea formosana Jordan, 1907 (Taiwan)
- Eterusia aedea hamajii Owada, 2001 (Japan: Tokunoshima Island)
- Eterusia aedea masatakasatoi Owada, 2001 (Japan: Nakanoshima Island)
- Eterusia aedea micromaculata Inoue, 1982 (Japan: Tokara Islands)
- Eterusia aedea okinawana Matsumura, 1931 (Japan: Ishigaki Island)
- Eterusia aedea sakaguchii Matsumura, 1927 (Japan: Okinawa Island)
- Eterusia aedea sinica Ménétriés, 1857 (China)
- Eterusia aedea sugitanii Matsumura, 1927 (Japan: Okinoshima)
- Eterusia aedea virescens (Butler, 1881) (southern India)
- Eterusia aedea tomokunii Owada, 1989 (Japan: Amami-oshima)

== Gallery ==
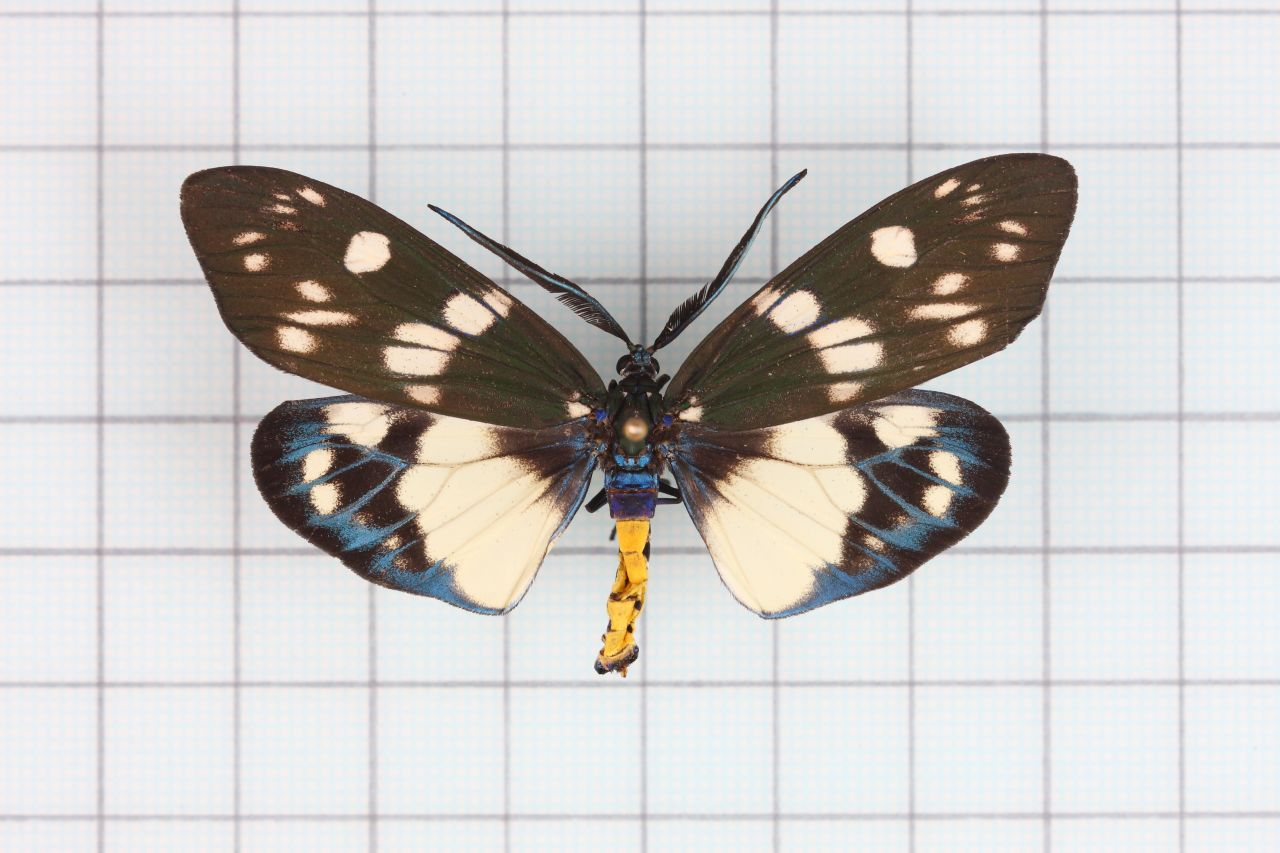
Eterusia aedea formosana
