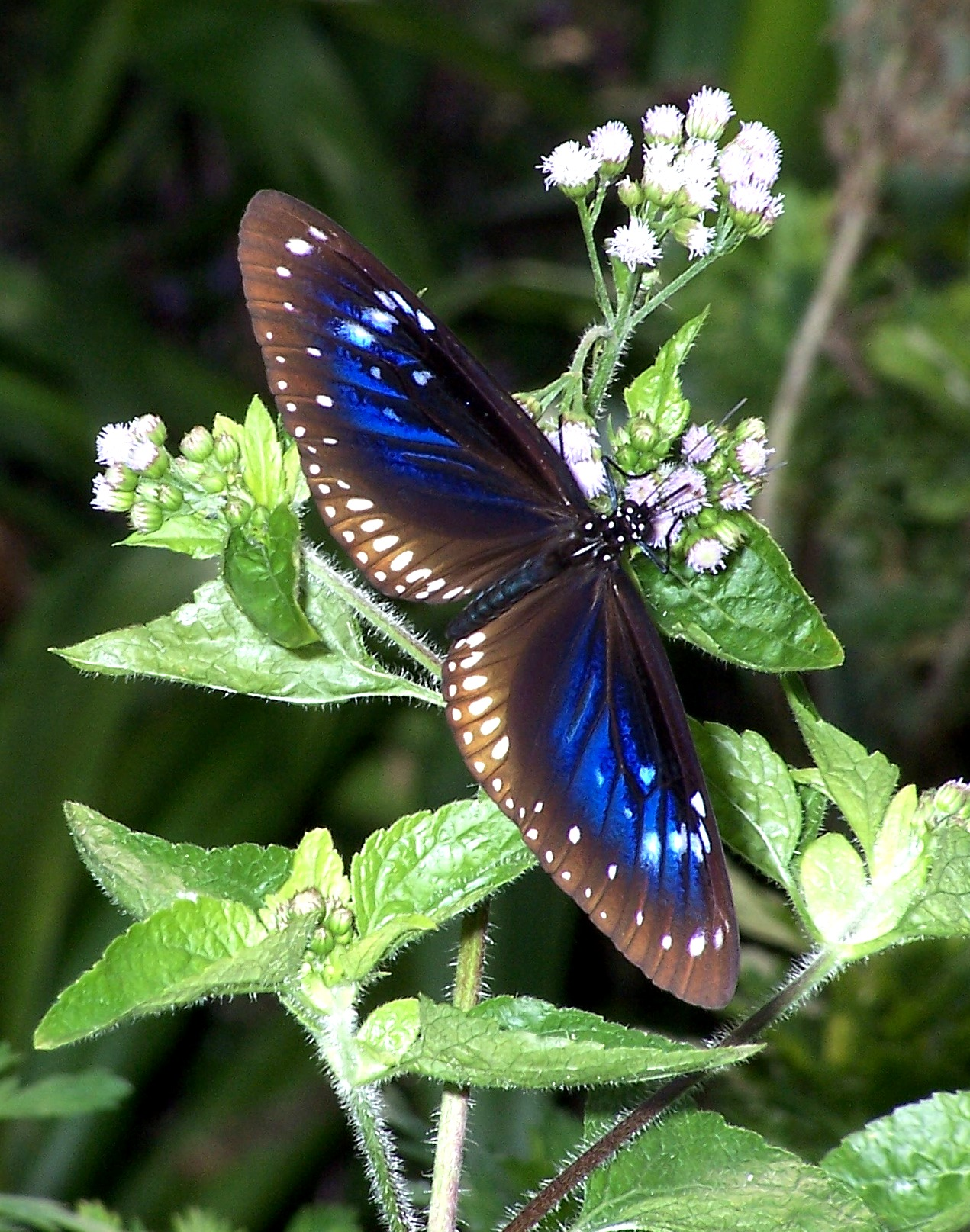

Scientific classification
- Kingdom: Animalia
- Phylum: Arthropoda
- Clade: Pancrustacea
- Class: Insecta
- Order: Lepidoptera
- Family: Nymphalidae
- Genus: Euploea
- Species: E. midamus

Binomial name
- Euploea midamus (Linnaeus, 1758)

= Euploea midamus =

Spotted blue crow

Species of butterfly

Euploea midamus, the blue spotted crow, is a butterfly found in India and South-East Asia that belongs to the crows and tigers, that is, the danaid group of the brush-footed butterflies family

== Subspecies ==
- E. m midamus N.Indo-China, N.Thailand
- E. m. chloe (Guérin-Méneville, 1843) Thailand, Peninsular Malaya, Langkawi
- E. m. rogenhoferi C. & R. Felder, [1865]. Nepal, Assam, Sikkim
- E. m. fabricii (Moore, 1883) Vietnam
- E. m. singapura (Moore, 1883) Singapore, Pulau Tioman
- E. m. sophia (Moore, 1883) Sumatra
- E. m. roepstorffi (Moore, 1883) Andamans, ?Nicobars
- E. m. rafflesi (Moore, 1883) Java

== See also ==
- Danainae
- Nymphalidae
- List of butterflies of India
- List of butterflies of India (Nymphalidae)
