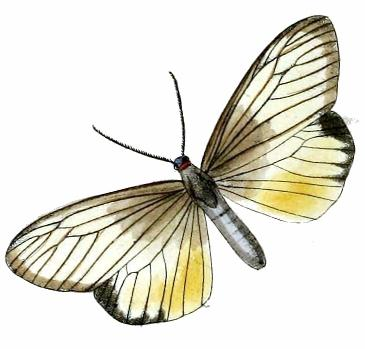

Scientific classification
- Domain: Eukaryota
- Kingdom: Animalia
- Phylum: Arthropoda
- Class: Insecta
- Order: Lepidoptera
- Family: Zygaenidae
- Genus: Milleria
- Species: M. adalifa

Binomial name
- Milleria adalifa (Doubleday, 1847)

Synonyms
- Gynautocera adalifa Doubleday, 1847; Chalcosia virginalis Herrich-Schäffer, 1853; Chalcosia candida Snellen van Vollenhoven, 1863; Cyclosia cardinalis Moore, 1879; Milleria cyanivena Hampson, 1892; Epyrgis forbesi Druce, 1882; Cyclosia fuliginosa Walker, 1854; Milleria fuhoshonis Strand, 1916; Chalcosia nitida Jordan, 1907; Cyclosia subcyanescens Walker, 1854; Milleriana adalifa Auctt.

= Milleria adalifa =

Species of moth

Milleria adalifa is a moth in the family Zygaenidae. It is found in Asia.

The forewings are dusky white, with black veins. The hindwings are pure white, clouded with pale chrome-yellow from the anal angle to beyond the middle. The apex and the outer margin are black.

== Subspecies ==
- Milleria adalifa adalifa (India, Burma)
- Milleria adalifa candida (Snellen van Vollenhoven, 1863) (Sumatra, Java)
- Milleria adalifa fuhoshonis Strand, 1916 (Taiwan)
