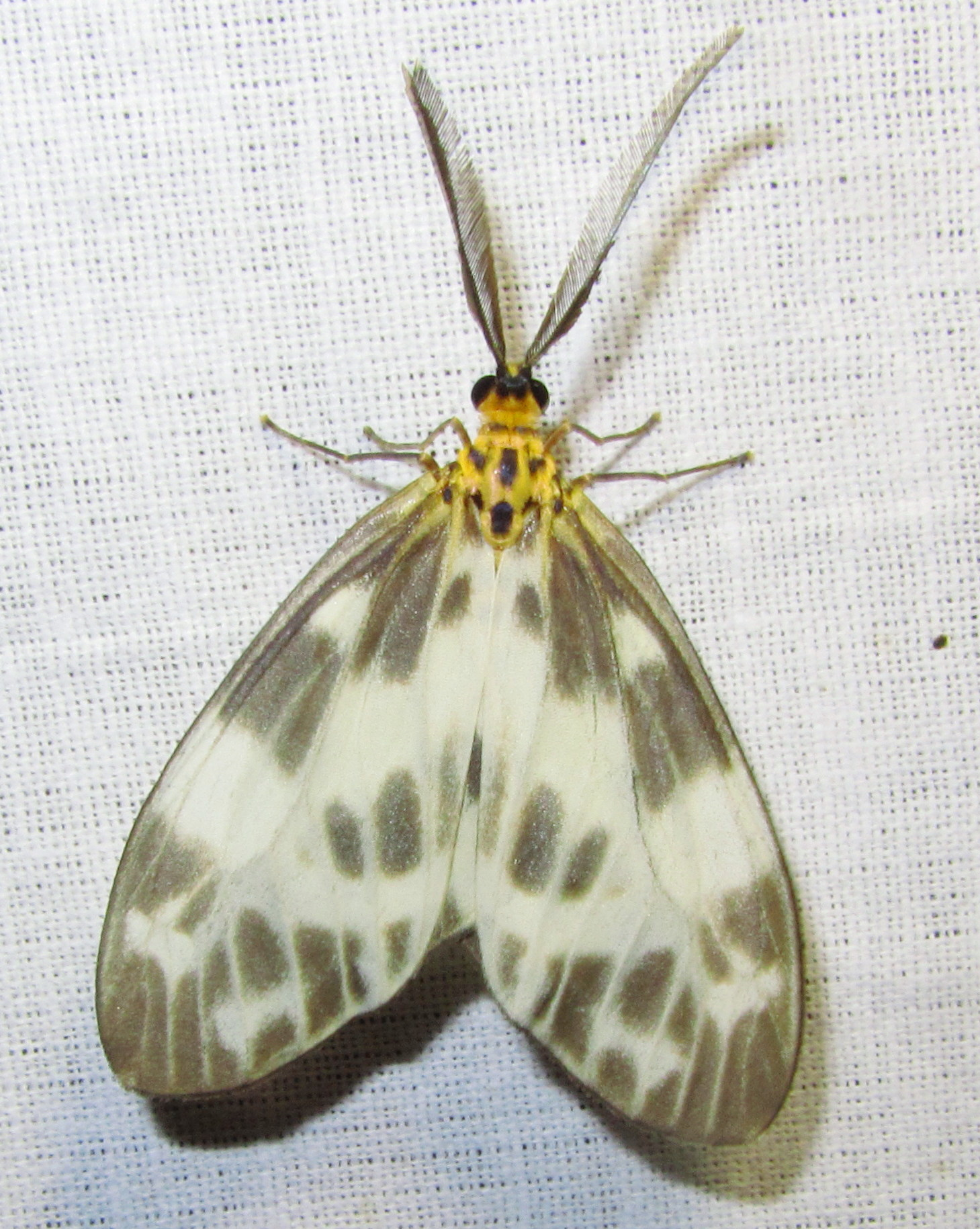

Scientific classification
- Kingdom: Animalia
- Phylum: Arthropoda
- Clade: Pancrustacea
- Class: Insecta
- Order: Lepidoptera
- Family: Zygaenidae
- Genus: Corma
- Species: C. maculata

Binomial name
- Corma maculata G. Hampson, 1892

= Corma maculata =

Species of lepidopteran insect (moth)

Corma maculata is a species of lepidopteran insect a moth in the family Zygaenidae. It is known from Assam (Northeast India), Bhutan, and Myanmar.
