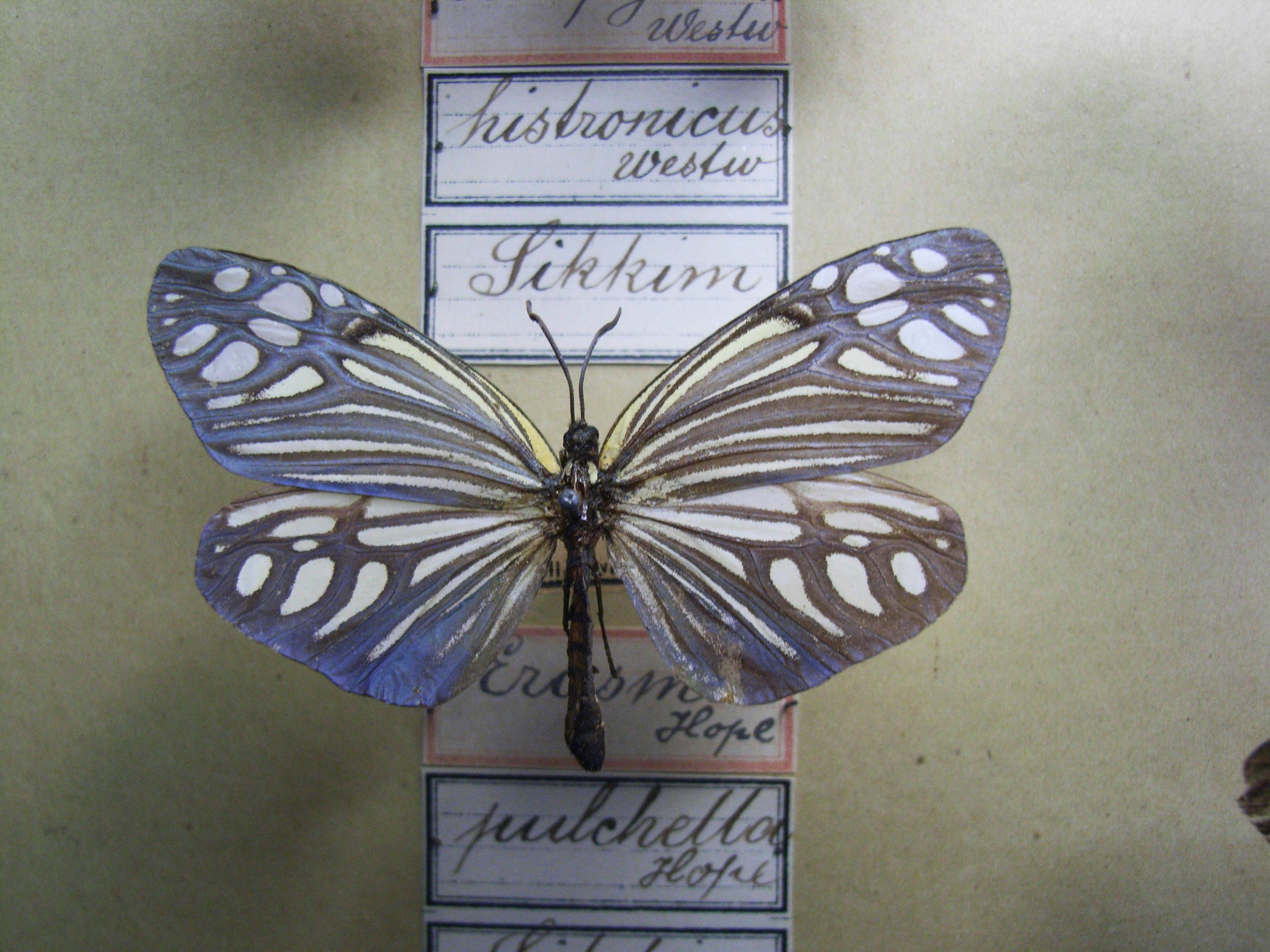

Scientific classification
- Kingdom: Animalia
- Phylum: Arthropoda
- Class: Insecta
- Order: Lepidoptera
- Family: Zygaenidae
- Genus: Campylotes
- Species: C. histrionicus

Binomial name
- Campylotes histrionicus Westwood, 1839

Synonyms
- Chalcosia histrionica

= Campylotes histrionicus =

Species of moth

Campylotes histrionicus is a day-flying moth of the family Zygaenidae found in Asia, including northern India, Vietnam and Nepal. In India, it is found throughout the Himalayas. It is black with red and orange streaks and white spots resembling the pattern of Danaus genutia. The binomial name was given by John O. Westwood in 1839.

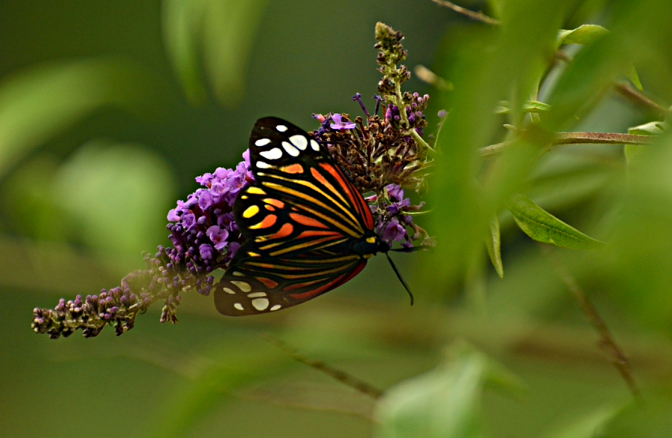
In Himachal Pradesh, India
