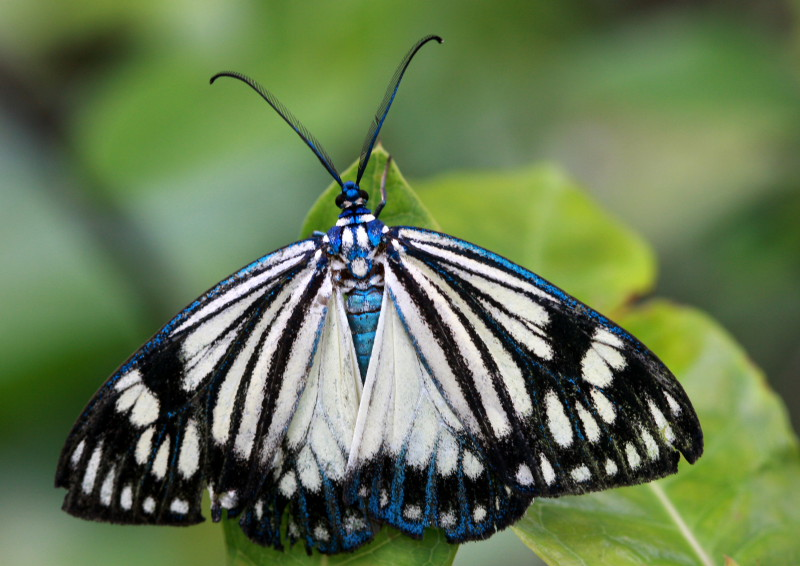

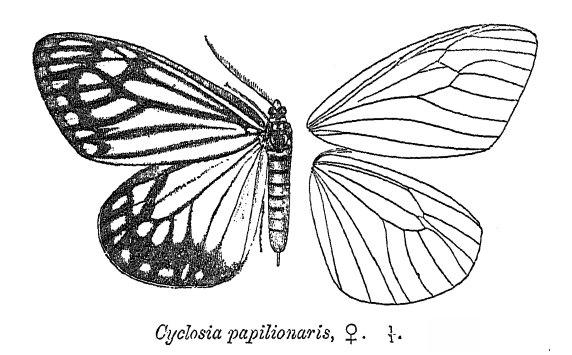

Scientific classification
- Kingdom: Animalia
- Phylum: Arthropoda
- Clade: Pancrustacea
- Class: Insecta
- Order: Lepidoptera
- Family: Zygaenidae
- Genus: Cyclosia
- Species: C. papilionaris

Binomial name
- Cyclosia papilionaris (Drury, 1773)

Synonyms
- Noctua papilionaris Drury, 1773; Epyrgis australinda Hampson, 1891; Cyclosia enodis Swinhoe, 1892; Eterusia ferrea Walker, 1854; Callamesia hormenia Hampson, 1892; Pintia latipennis Hampson, 1891; Cyclosia obsoleta Dufrane, 1936; Cyclosia pallida Dufrane, 1936; Epyrgis parvula Butler, 1883; Phaleana venaria Fabricius, 1775

= Cyclosia papilionaris =

Species of moth

Cyclosia papilionaris, Drury's jewel, is a moth in the family Zygaenidae. It was described by Dru Drury in 1773. It is found from Thailand to southern China. It is also found in Andaman and Nicobar Islands, India. The habitat consists of rainforests and humid deciduous forests at altitudes up to 1,000 meters.

The larvae feed on Aporosa dioica.

== Subspecies ==
- Cyclosia papilionaris papilionaris (China)
- Cyclosia papilionaris adusta Jordan, 1907
- Cyclosia papilionaris australinda (Hampson, 1891) (southern India)
- Cyclosia papilionaris mekongensis Nakamura, 1974 (Laos)
- Cyclosia papilionaris nicobarensis Hering, 1922 (Nicobar Islands)
- Cyclosia papilionaris nigrescens Moore, 1877 (Andamans)
- Cyclosia papilionaris philippinensis Draeseke, 1924 (Polilo)
- Cyclosia papilionaris venaria (Fabricius, 1775) (Bhutan, India: Sikkim, Assam)
