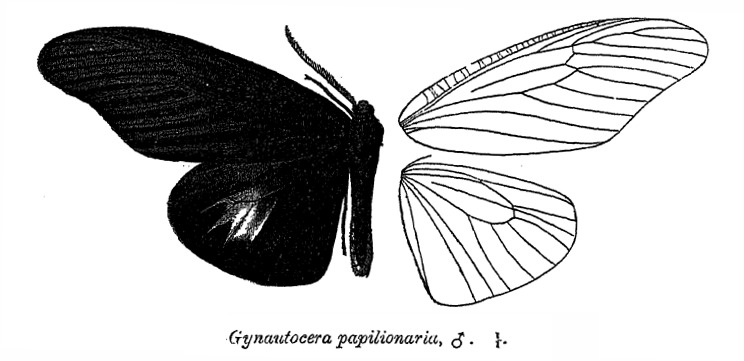

Scientific classification
- Domain: Eukaryota
- Kingdom: Animalia
- Phylum: Arthropoda
- Class: Insecta
- Order: Lepidoptera
- Family: Zygaenidae
- Genus: Gynautocera
- Species: G. papilionaria

Binomial name
- Gynautocera papilionaria Guérin-Meneville, 1831

= Gynautocera papilionaria =

Species of moth

Gynautocera papilionaria is a moth of the family Zygaenidae. It is found in south-east Asia, including northern India, Thailand, Laos, Assam, Burma, Vietnam, Tonkin, Hainan, Sumatra, Java, Lombok, Celebes, Amboina, Buru and Batjan. Larvae have been recorded on Litsea monopetala.

== Description ==
The wingspan is about 72 mm. It is a day-flying species.
