= Hibbertia tenuis =

Yundi guinea-flower

Conservation status
- Critically endangered (EPBC Act)

Scientific classification
- Kingdom: Plantae
- Clade: Tracheophytes
- Clade: Angiosperms
- Clade: Eudicots
- Order: Dilleniales
- Family: Dilleniaceae
- Genus: Hibbertia
- Species: H. tenuis

Binomial name
- Hibbertia tenuis Toelken & R.J.Bates

Species of flowering plant

Hibbertia tenuis, commonly known as Yundi guinea-flower, is a species of flowering plant in the family Dilleniaceae and is endemic to a restricted area of the Fleurieu Peninsula, South Australia. It is a delicate, low-lying to scrambling shrublet with hairy foliage, linear leaves and bright yellow flowers with four to six stamens on one side of two carpels.

== Description ==
Hibbertia tenuis is a delicate, low-lying to scrambling shrublet with branches up to 50 cm (20 in) long and foliage covered with small, star-shaped hairs. The leaves are linear, mostly 4.4–7.0 mm (0.17–0.28 in) long and 0.7–1.1 mm (0.028–0.043 in) wide on a petiole 0.2–0.5 mm (0.0079–0.0197 in) long. The flowers are arranged singly mostly on a thread-like peduncle 4–18 mm (0.16–0.71 in) long on the end of shoots with linear bracts 1.4–2.8 mm (0.055–0.110 in) long at the base. The five sepals are 4.1–5.3 mm (0.16–0.21 in) long and joined at the base, the outer lobes narrow lance-shaped and the inner lobes narrowly oblong. The petals are bright yellow, egg-shaped with the narrower end towards the base, 5.2–7.8 mm (0.20–0.31 in) long with four to six stamens fused at the base on one side of two carpels. Flowering are present in most months.

== Taxonomy ==
Hibbertia tenuis was first formally described in 1995 by Hellmut R. Toelken and Robert John Bates in the Journal of the Adelaide Botanic Gardens from specimens collected by Toelken near Yundi in 1991. The specific epithet (tenuifolia) means "delicate", referring to its habit compared to H. australis.

== Distribution and habitat ==
This hibbertia grows in low or sparse vegetation in wetland and swampy areas near Mount Compass.

== Conservation status ==
Hibbertia tenuis is listed as "critically endangered" under the Australian Government Environment Protection and Biodiversity Conservation Act 1999.

== See also ==
- List of Hibbertia species
