= Hibbertia brownii =

Scientific classification
- Kingdom: Plantae
- Clade: Tracheophytes
- Clade: Angiosperms
- Clade: Eudicots
- Order: Dilleniales
- Family: Dilleniaceae
- Genus: Hibbertia
- Species: H. brownii

Binomial name
- Hibbertia brownii Benth.

Species of flowering plant

Hibbertia brownii is a species of flowering plant in the family Dilleniaceae and is endemic to the Northern Territory. It is a shrub with narrow elliptic leaves that are glabrous on the upper surface, paler below with dense woolly hairs and racemes of yellow flowers. Flowering occurs in most months. It is similar to H. dealbata, H. candicans and H. arnhemica.

Hibbertia brownii was first formally described in 1863 by George Bentham in Flora Australiensis from specimens collected by Robert Brown.

This hibbertia is found in the northern part of the Northern Territory. The species is classified as "least concern" under the Northern Territory Government Territory Parks and Wildlife Conservation Act 1976.

== See also ==
- List of Hibbertia species
