= Hibbertia bicarpellata =

Scientific classification
- Kingdom: Plantae
- Clade: Tracheophytes
- Clade: Angiosperms
- Clade: Eudicots
- Order: Dilleniales
- Family: Dilleniaceae
- Genus: Hibbertia
- Species: H. bicarpellata

Binomial name
- Hibbertia bicarpellata Toelken

Species of flowering plant

Hibbertia bicarpellata is a species of flowering plant in the family Dilleniaceae and is endemic to northern Queensland. It is a shrub with hairy, ridged branches, elliptic leaves and yellow flowers arranged singly in leaf axils, with twenty to twenty-six stamens arranged in groups around the two carpels.

== Description ==
Hibbertia bicarpellata is a shrub that typically grows to a height of 1.5 m (4 ft 11 in), its branches with ridges from below the leaf bases, and its branches and leaves covered with rosette-like bundles of hairs. The leaves are elliptic, 20–45 mm (0.79–1.77 in) long and 8–15 mm (0.31–0.59 in) wide on a petiole 0.5–2 mm (0.020–0.079 in) long. The flowers are arranged singly in leaf axils on a stiff peduncle 4.4–7.5 mm (0.17–0.30 in) long, with linear to lance-shaped bracts 3.5–5 mm (0.14–0.20 in) long. The five sepals are joined at the base, the three outer sepal lobes 7–10 mm (0.28–0.39 in) long and the inner lobes 5.6–6.6 mm (0.22–0.26 in) long. The five petals are egg-shaped with the narrower end towards the base, yellow, 6.8–9.6 mm (0.27–0.38 in) long and notched at the tip. There are twenty to twenty-six stamens arranged around the two carpels, each carpel with four ovules. Flowering occurs from February to September.

== Taxonomy ==
Hibbertia bicarpellata was first formally described in 2010 by Hellmut R. Toelken in the Journal of the Adelaide Botanic Gardens from specimens collected by Richard Schodde in the Moomin Forest Reserve in 1963. The specific epithet (bicarpellata) means "two carpelled", referring to the difference between this species and Hibbertia melhanioides, in which this species was previously included.

== Distribution and habitat ==
This hibbertia usually grows in forest and is found on parts of the Atherton Tableland in northern Queensland.

== Conservation status ==
Hibbertia bicarpellata is classified as of "least concern" under the Queensland Government Nature Conservation Act 1992.

== See also ==
- List of Hibbertia species
