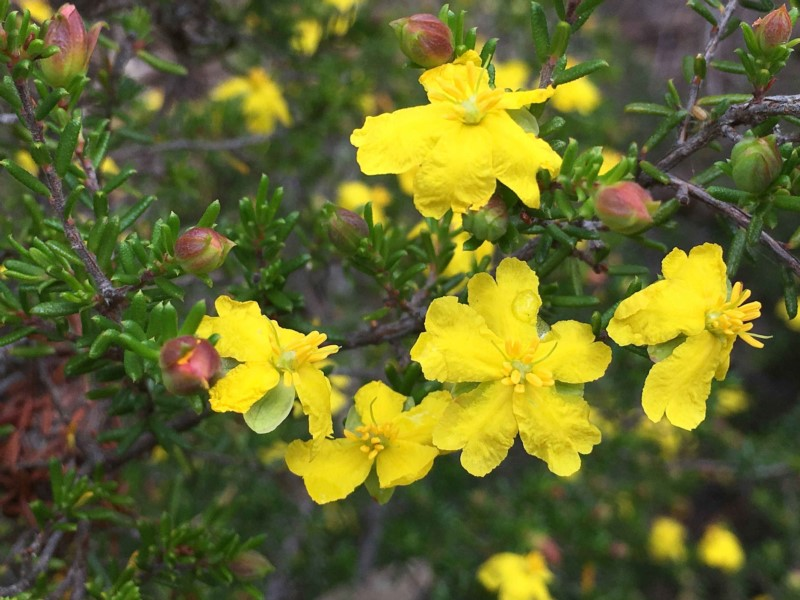

Scientific classification
- Kingdom: Plantae
- Clade: Tracheophytes
- Clade: Angiosperms
- Clade: Eudicots
- Order: Dilleniales
- Family: Dilleniaceae
- Genus: Hibbertia
- Species: H. ericifolia

Binomial name
- Hibbertia ericifolia Hook.f.

= Hibbertia ericifolia =

Species of flowering plant

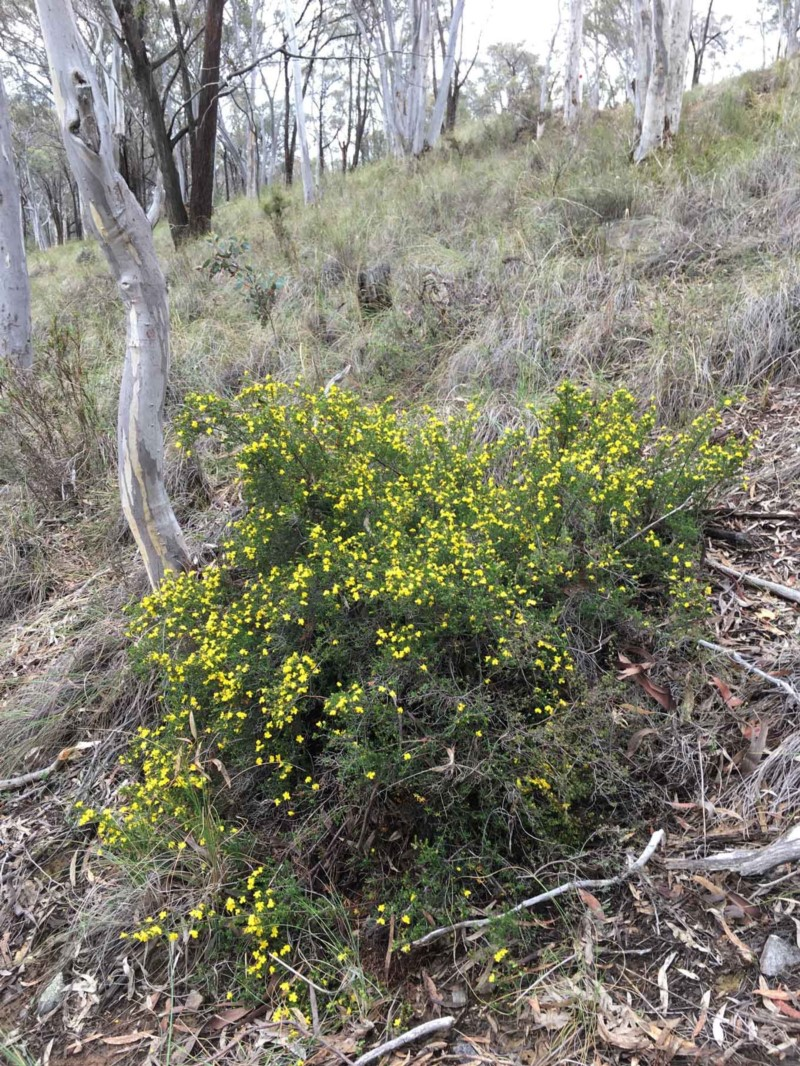
On Mount Jerrabomberra near Queanbeyan

Hibbertia ericifolia is a species of flowering plant in the family Dilleniaceae and is endemic to south-eastern Australia. It is small, sometimes low-lying to spreading shrub with wiry stems, linear to narrow elliptic leaves, and yellow flowers arranged on the ends of branchlets, with ten to twenty-four stamens arranged around the three carpels.

== Description ==
Hibbertia ericifolia is a shrub that typically grows to a height of up to 50 cm (20 in) with wiry stems up to 60 cm (24 in) long. The leaves are linear to narrow elliptic or oblong, 1.5–6.5 mm (0.059–0.256 in) long and 0.5–1.1 mm (0.020–0.043 in) wide on a petiole 0.2–0.5 mm (0.0079–0.0197 in) long. The flowers are arranged singly on the ends of branchlets and are more or less sessile, with up to three lance-shaped to spatula-shaped bracts at the base. The sepals are 3.3–6.1 mm (0.13–0.24 in) long and the five petals are yellow, egg-shaped with the narrower end towards the base and 3.8–8.4 mm (0.15–0.33 in) long. There are between ten and twenty-four stamens arranged around the three carpels. each containing four ovules. Flowering mainly occurs from September to February.

== Taxonomy ==
Hibbertia ericifolia was first formally described in 1855 by Joseph Dalton Hooker in The botany of the Antarctic voyage of H.M. Discovery ships Erebus and Terror from a specimen collected by Ronald Campbell Gunn. The specific epithet (ericifolia) means "Erica-leaved".

Long considered conspecific with Hibbertia serpyllifolia after George Bentham combined the two in his Flora Australiensis, H. ericifolia is now recognised as distinct and is found in south-eastern Australia.

== Distribution and habitat ==
This hibbertia occurs on the coast and tablelands of New South Wales south from the Central Coast, in adjacent areas of Victoria, and on the tablelands of Tasmania. It usually grows on rocky soils, often in woodland.
