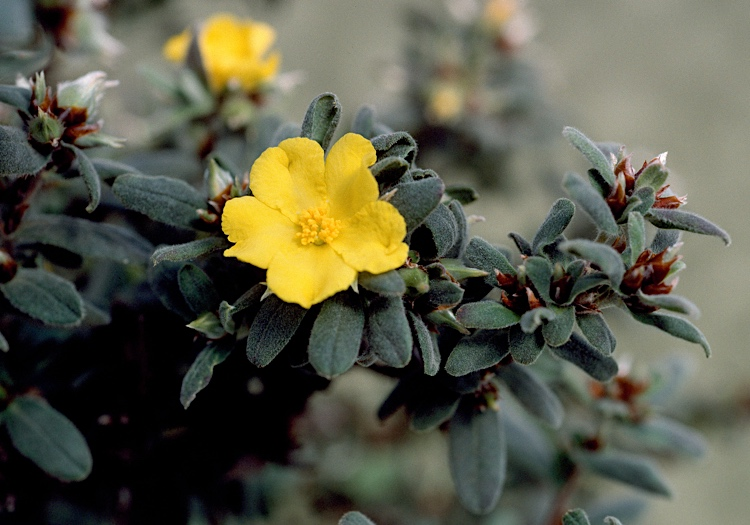
- In the Australian National Botanic Gardens

Scientific classification
- Kingdom: Plantae
- Clade: Embryophytes
- Clade: Tracheophytes
- Clade: Spermatophytes
- Clade: Angiosperms
- Clade: Eudicots
- Order: Dilleniales
- Family: Dilleniaceae
- Genus: Hibbertia
- Species: H. montana

Binomial name
- Hibbertia montana Steud.

Synonyms
- Hibbertia montana Steud. var. montana; Hibbertia montana var. normalis Domin nom. inval.; Hibbertia sargenti S.Moore orth. var.; Hibbertia sargentii S.Moore

= Hibbertia montana =

Species of flowering plant

Hibbertia montana is a species of flowering plant in the family Dilleniaceae and is endemic to the south-west of Western Australia. It is an erect, straggling or sprawling shrub with densely hairy foliage, narrow oblong leaves, and pedunculate yellow flowers with thirty to sixty stamens and a few staminodes arranged around velvety carpels.

== Description ==
Hibbertia montana is an erect, straggling or sprawling, densely hairy shrub that typically grows to a height of 10–70 cm (3.9–27.6 in) high. The leaves are narrow oblong, 15–23 mm (0.59–0.91 in) long and 4–7 mm (0.16–0.28 in) wide. The flowers are 20–35 mm (0.79–1.38 in) in diameter and are usually arranged on a peduncle, the five sepals densely silky-hairy. There are thirty to sixty stamens and a few staminodes arranged around the four or five velvety-hairy carpels. Flowering occurs from July to October.

== Taxonomy ==
Hibbertia montana was first formally described in 1845 by Ernst Gottlieb von Steudel in 1845 in Johann Georg Christian Lehmann's Plantae Preissianae from specimens collected near York in 1839. The specific epithet (montana) means "pertaining to mountains".

== Distribution and habitat ==
This hibbertia grows near granite rocks and on hills on the Darling Range in the Avon Wheatbelt and Jarrah Forest biogeographic regions of south-western Western Australia.

== Conservation status ==
Hibbertia montana is classified as "not threatened" by the Western Australian Government Department of Parks and Wildlife.

== See also ==
- List of Hibbertia species
