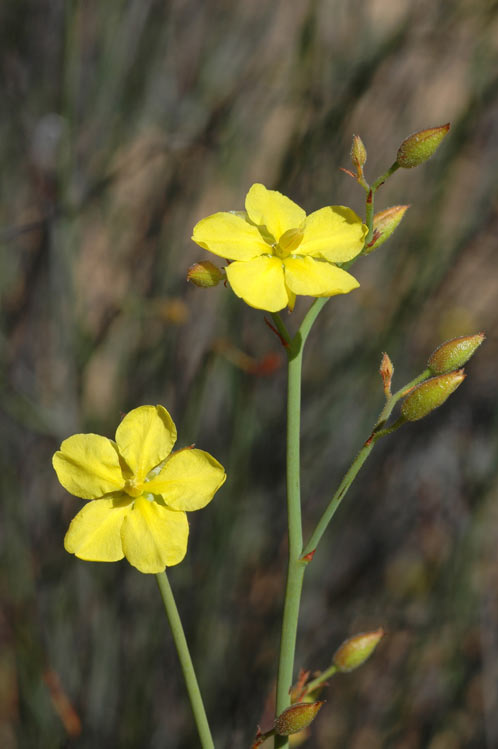
- Hibbertia conspicua north-east of Kalbarri

Scientific classification
- Kingdom: Plantae
- Clade: Tracheophytes
- Clade: Angiosperms
- Clade: Eudicots
- Order: Dilleniales
- Family: Dilleniaceae
- Genus: Hibbertia
- Species: H. crassifolia

Binomial name
- Hibbertia crassifolia (Turcz.) Benth.

= Hibbertia conspicua =

Leafless hibbertia

Species of flowering plant

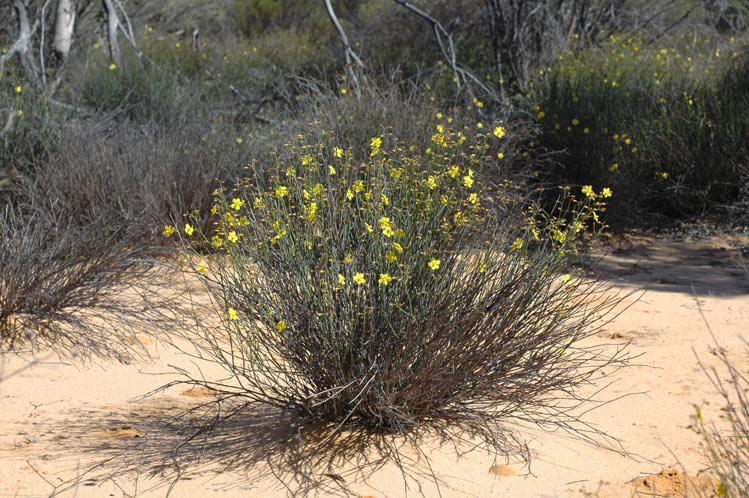
Habit

Hibbertia conspicua, commonly known as leafless hibbertia, is a shrub in the Dilleniaceae family and is endemic to Western Australia. It is an erect, leafless shrub that typically grows to a height of 0.2–0.6 m (7.9 in – 1 ft 11.6 in). It has yellow flowers between September and January and is found in the Avon Wheatbelt, Carnarvon, Coolgardie, Geraldton Sandplains and Yalgoo biogeographic regions of Western Australia.

This species was first formally described in 1855 by William Henry Harvey from an unpublished description by James Drummond who gave it the name Huttia conspicua. Harvey's description was published in Hooker's Journal of Botany and Kew Garden Miscellany. In 1893, Ernest Friedrich Gilg changed the name to Hibbertia conspicua. The specific epithet (conspicua) means "remarkable" or "striking".

== See also ==
- List of Hibbertia species
