= Hibbertia abyssus =

Bandalup buttercup

Conservation status
- Critically endangered (EPBC Act)

Scientific classification
- Kingdom: Plantae
- Clade: Tracheophytes
- Clade: Angiosperms
- Clade: Eudicots
- Order: Dilleniales
- Family: Dilleniaceae
- Genus: Hibbertia
- Species: H. abyssus

Binomial name
- Hibbertia abyssus Wege & K.R.Thiele
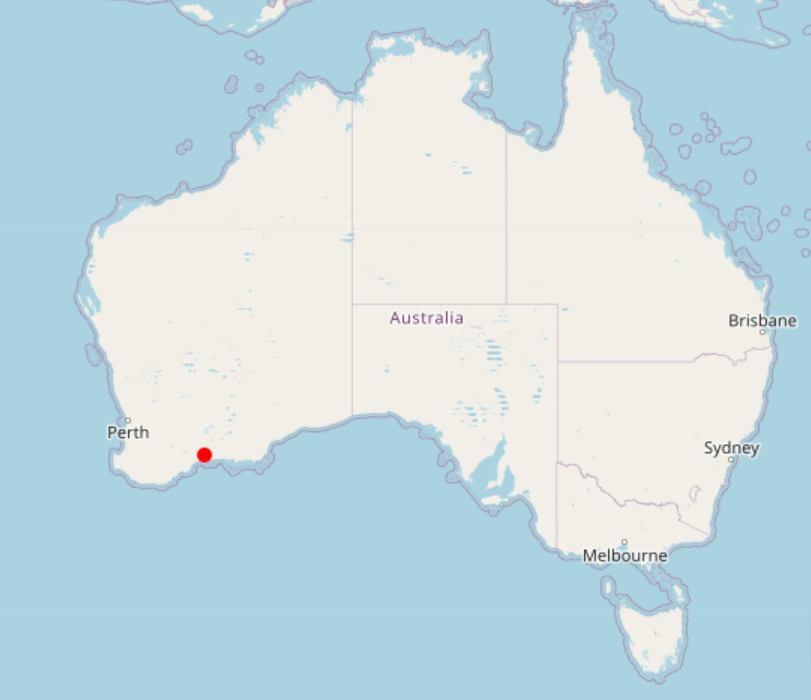
- Occurrence data from AVH

Species of flowering plant

Hibbertia abyssus, commonly known as Bandalup buttercup, is a species of flowering plant in the family Dilleniaceae and is endemic to a restricted area of Western Australia. It is an erect shrub with linear to tapering leaves and yellow flowers arranged singly in leaf axils with the five stamens all on one side of the carpels.

== Description ==
Hibbertia abyssus is an erect shrub that typically grows to a height of up to 1.2 m (3 ft 11 in), its young branchlets covered with tiny star-shaped hairs. The leaves are crowded and spirally arranged along the branchlets, linear to subulate, 6–11 mm (0.24–0.43 in) long and 0.9–1.4 mm (0.035–0.055 in) wide on a petiole 0.5–1 mm (0.020–0.039 in) long. The flowers are arranged singly in leaf axils on a peduncle 6–14 mm (0.24–0.55 in) long with a narrow triangular bract 1.5–2 mm (0.059–0.079 in) long at the base. The five sepals are green with dark red markings, elliptic to narrow egg-shaped, 3.5–5 mm (0.14–0.20 in) long, the outer sepals with a pointed tip and the inner sepals rounded. The five petals are yellow, 6–8.5 mm (0.24–0.33 in) long and egg-shaped with the narrower end towards the base. The five stamens are all on one side of the two carpels and are joined at the base. The carpels are densely hairy and there are two ovules per carpel. Flowering has been recorded in October, November and February.

== Taxonomy ==
Hibbertia abyssus was first formally described in 2009 as Hibbertia abyssa by Juliet Wege and Kevin Thiele in the journal Nuytsia from specimens collected on Bandalup Hill near Ravensthorpe in 2008. (Hibbertia abyssa is an orthographical variant of Hibbertia abyssus.) The specific epithet (abyssus) means "growing next to an abyss", referring to its growing near the edge of a mining pit and to its "perilous conservation status".

== Distribution and habitat ==
Bandalup buttercup grows on rocky outcrops in open mallee shrubland. It was previously known from four populations on Bandalup Hill but two of these were cleared for the Ravensthorpe Nickel Mine.

== Conservation status ==
Hibbertia abyssus is classified as "critically endangered" under the Australian Government Environment Protection and Biodiversity Conservation Act 1999 and as "Threatened Flora (Declared Rare Flora — Extant)" by the Department of Environment and Conservation (Western Australia). The main threats to the species are activities associated with mining, and possibly also inappropriate fire regimes and dieback caused by Phytophthora cinnamomi.

== See also ==
- List of Hibbertia species
