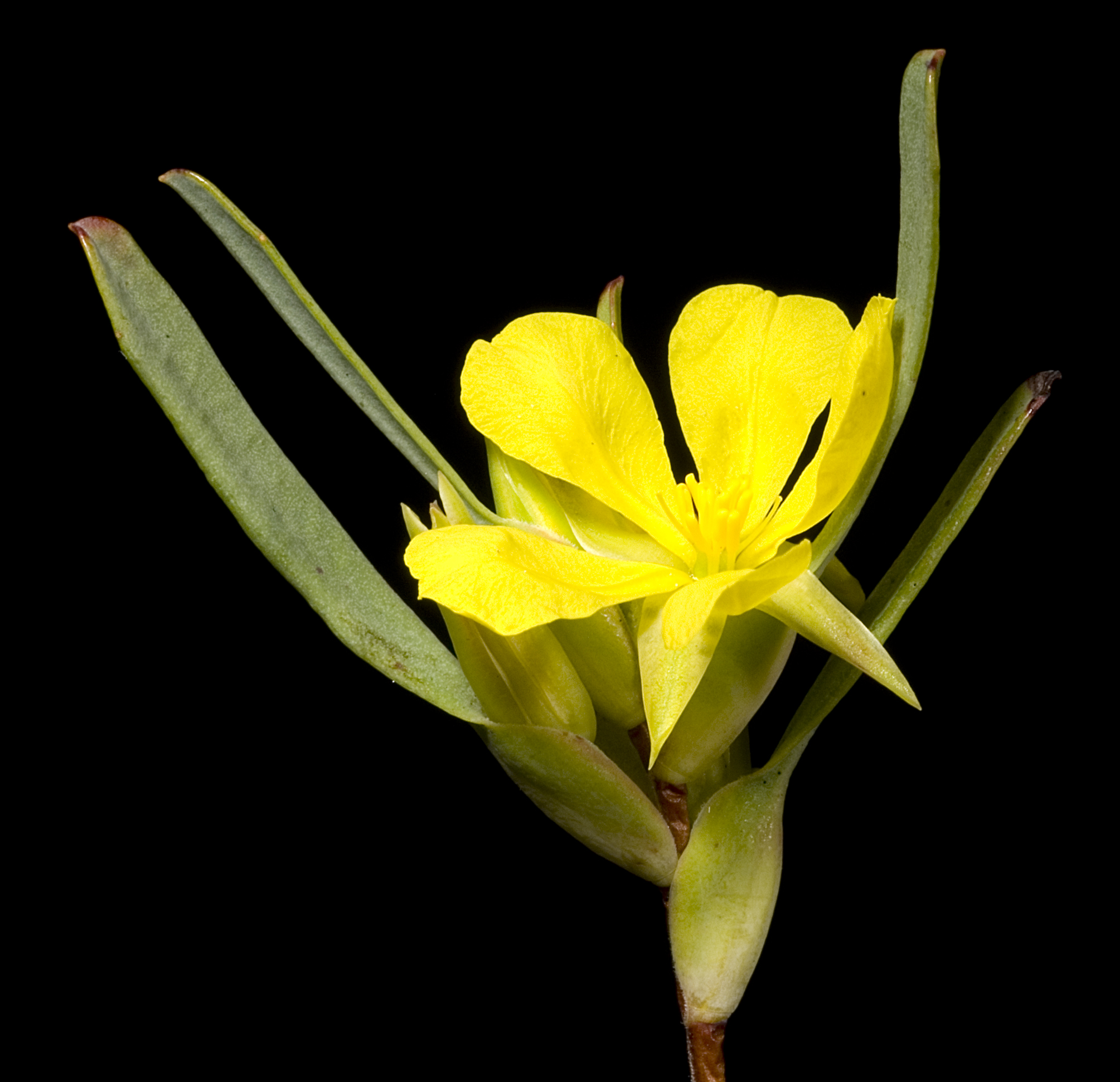

Scientific classification
- Kingdom: Plantae
- Clade: Tracheophytes
- Clade: Angiosperms
- Clade: Eudicots
- Order: Dilleniales
- Family: Dilleniaceae
- Genus: Hibbertia
- Species: H. subvaginata

Binomial name
- Hibbertia subvaginata (Steud.) F.Muell.

Synonyms
- Candollea subvaginata Steud. Candollea glaberrima Steud. Hibbertia polygonoides F.Muell. Hibbertia glaberrima (Steud.) Gilg) nom. illeg.

= Hibbertia subvaginata =

Species of plant

Hibbertia subvaginata is a species of flowering plant in the family Dilleniaceae and is endemic to Western Australia. It is a small shrub that has yellow flowers with stamens arranged around three or four carpels.

== Description ==
Hibbertia subvaginata is an erect, occasionally a spreading or straggling shrub, that typically grows to a height of 0.15–1.2 m (5.9 in – 3 ft 11.2 in). The leaves have a wedge-shaped tip and a more or less sheathing base. Its yellow flowers may be seen from July to December and have their stamens arranged around three or four carpels.

== Taxonomy ==
This species was first described in 1845 by Ernst Gottlieb von Steudel who gave it the name Candollea subvaginata in Lehmann's Plantae Preissianae. In 1880, Ferdinand von Mueller changed the name to Hibbertia subvaginata in Fragmenta Phytographiae Australiae. The specific epithet (subvaginata) derives from the Latin, sub-, ("somewhat" or "not completely") and vaginata ("sheathed") to give a Botanical Latin compound adjective meaning "somewhat sheathed" referring to the leaves.

== Distribution and habitat ==
Hibbertia subvaginata is found in the biogeographic regions of the Avon Wheatbelt, Esperance Plains, the Geraldton Sandplains, the Jarrah Forest, the Swan Coastal Plain, and Warren. It grows on sand, granite, laterite, on sandplains, sand dunes, floodplains, and outcrops.
