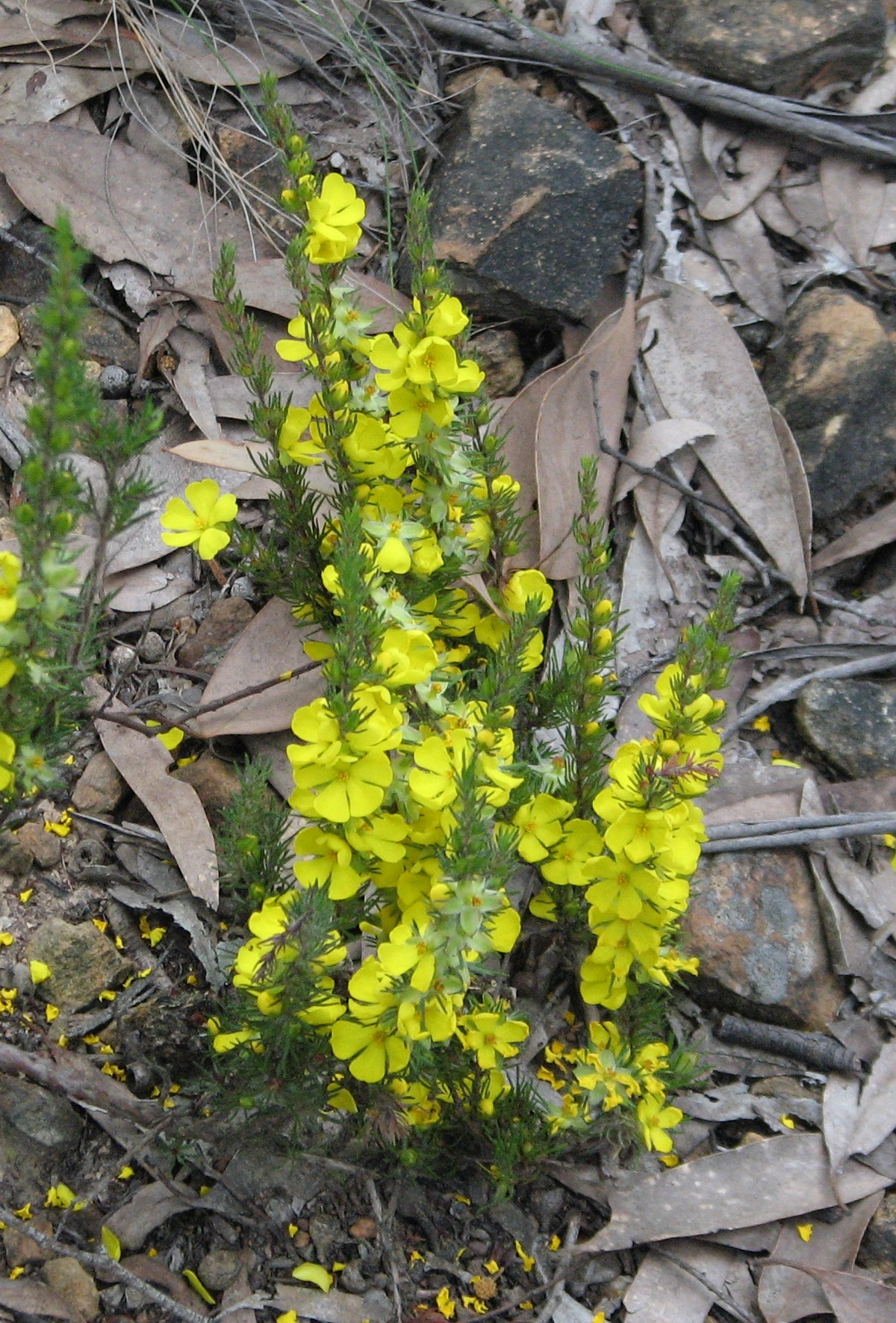
- Hibbertia prostrata, Fryers Ranges, Victoria

Scientific classification
- Kingdom: Plantae
- Clade: Tracheophytes
- Clade: Angiosperms
- Clade: Eudicots
- Order: Dilleniales
- Family: Dilleniaceae
- Genus: Hibbertia
- Species: H. prostrata

Binomial name
- Hibbertia prostrata Hook.

Synonyms
- Hibbertia fasciculata var. prostrata (Hook.) Hook.f.

= Hibbertia prostrata =

Species of plant

Hibbertia prostrata, commonly known as bundled Guinea-flower, is a small shrub that is endemic to south-eastern Australia. It grows to 50 cm tall and has narrow leaves that are about 20 mm long and about 1 mm wide. Yellow flowers appear from September to December in the species native range. The species occurs in heath in South Australia, Victoria and Tasmania.

Hibbertia prostrata is listed as a synonym of Hibbertia fasciculata by the Australian Plant Census.
