= Hibbertia dealbata =

Scientific classification
- Kingdom: Plantae
- Clade: Tracheophytes
- Clade: Angiosperms
- Clade: Eudicots
- Order: Dilleniales
- Family: Dilleniaceae
- Genus: Hibbertia
- Species: H. dealbata

Binomial name
- Hibbertia dealbata (R.Br. ex DC.) Benth.

Synonyms
- Hemistema dealbatum A.D.Chapm. orth. var.; Hemistemma dealbatum R.Br. ex DC.

Species of plant

Hibbertia dealbata is a species of flowering plant in the family Dilleniaceae and is endemic to northern Australia. It is an erect shrub that typically grows to a height of up to 2 m (6 ft 7 in). It is similar to Hibbertia brownii but has lance-shaped to egg-shaped leaves with the lower end towards the base and flattened hairs on the lower surface. The flowers are arranged on the ends of the branchlets.

Hibbertia dealbata was first formally described in 1817 by Augustin Pyramus de Candolle in his Regni Vegetabilis Systema Naturale from an unpublished description by Robert Brown and was given the name Hemistemma dealbatum. In 1863, George Bentham changed the name to Hibbertia dealbata in Flora Australiensis. Hibbertia dealbata occurs in the northern part of the Northern Territory and in Queensland. It is classified as of "least concern" under the Northern Territory Government Territory Parks and Wildlife Conservation Act 1976 and under the Queensland Government Nature Conservation Act 1992.

== See also ==
- List of Hibbertia species
