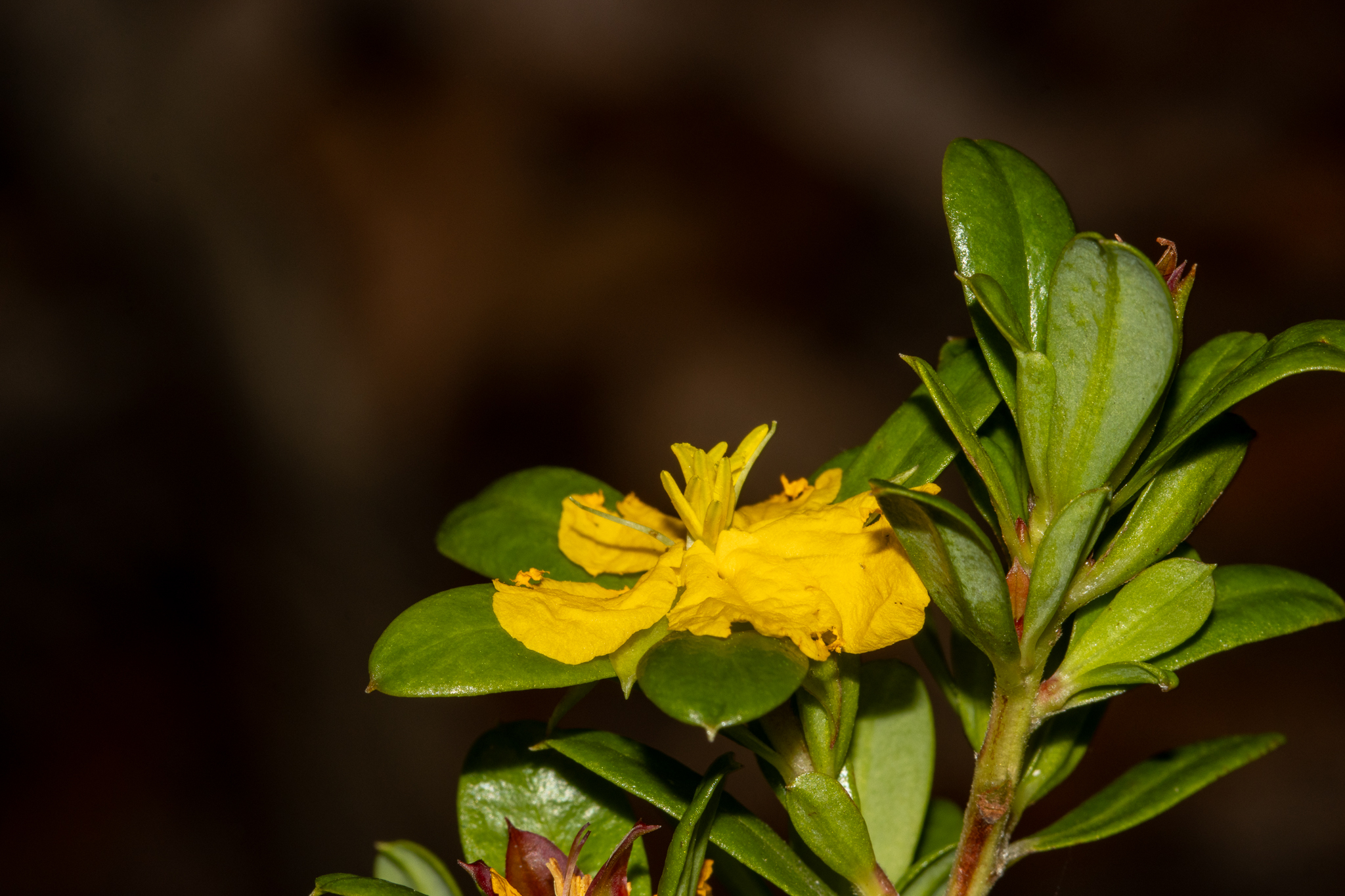

Scientific classification
- Kingdom: Plantae
- Clade: Embryophytes
- Clade: Tracheophytes
- Clade: Spermatophytes
- Clade: Angiosperms
- Clade: Eudicots
- Order: Dilleniales
- Family: Dilleniaceae
- Genus: Hibbertia
- Species: H. nitida

Binomial name
- Hibbertia nitida (R.Br. ex DC.) Benth.

= Hibbertia nitida =

Species of flowering plant

Hibbertia nitida is a species of flowering plant in the family Dilleniaceae and is endemic to the Central Coast of New South Wales. It is an erect shrub with lance-shaped leaves with the narrower end towards the base and yellow flowers with about eleven stamens arranged on one side of two silky-hairy carpels.

== Description ==
Hibbertia nitida is an erect or diffuse shrub that typically grows to a height of 1.0 m (3 ft 3 in) and has glabrous branches. The leaves are lance-shaped with the narrower end towards the base, 10–20 mm (0.39–0.79 in) long and 3–6 mm (0.12–0.24 in) wide. The flowers are arranged in leaf axils or near the ends of branches and are sessile. The sepals are 7–8 mm (0.28–0.31 in) long and glabrous, the petals yellow and 8–10 mm (0.31–0.39 in) long. There are about eleven stamens arranged around the two silky-hairy carpels. Flowering mainly occurs in spring.

== Taxonomy ==
This species was first formally described in 1817 by Augustin Pyramus de Candolle from an unpublished description by Robert Brown. De Candolle's description was published in his Regni Vegetabilis Systema Naturale. In 1863, George Bentham changed the name to Hibbertia nitida in Flora Australiensis.

== Distribution and habitat ==
Hibbertia nitida grows on sandstone and is widespread in the Sydney region.
