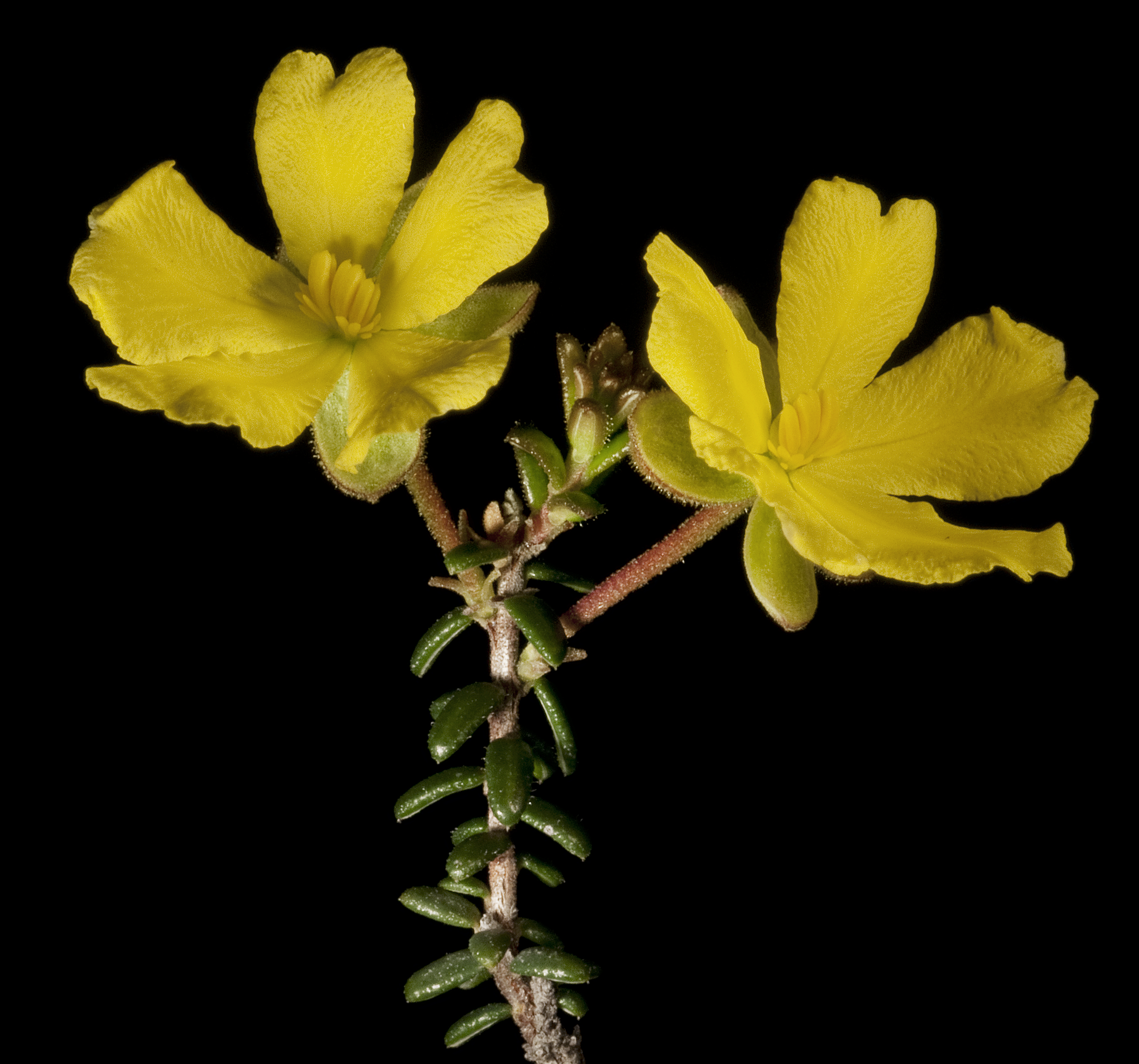

Scientific classification
- Kingdom: Plantae
- Clade: Embryophytes
- Clade: Tracheophytes
- Clade: Spermatophytes
- Clade: Angiosperms
- Clade: Eudicots
- Order: Dilleniales
- Family: Dilleniaceae
- Genus: Hibbertia
- Species: H. microphylla

Binomial name
- Hibbertia microphylla Steud.

= Hibbertia microphylla =

Species of flowering plant

Hibbertia microphylla is a species of flowering plant in the family Dilleniaceae and is endemic to the south-west of Western Australia. It is a shrub with weakly ascending stems, broadly egg-shaped to elliptic leaves and yellow flowers, usually with ten stamens and up to nine staminodes arranged on one side of, and leaning over the two densely hairy carpels.

== Description ==
Hibbertia microphylla is a shrub with mostly weakly ascending branches and that typically grows to a height of 20–50 cm (7.9–19.7 in). The leaves are mostly egg-shaped to elliptic, sometimes almost round, 4–8 mm (0.16–0.31 in) long and 1.0–1.8 mm (0.039–0.071 in) wide on a petiole 0.1–0.4 mm (0.0039–0.0157 in) long. The leaves curve downwards and the edges are rolled under, obscuring most of the lower surface. The flowers are arranged singly in upper leaf axils on a pedicel 5–15 mm (0.20–0.59 in) long with bracts 1–2 mm (0.039–0.079 in) long at the base of the sepals. The five sepals are joined at the base, egg-shaped and 3.5–5 mm (0.14–0.20 in) long, the inner sepals slightly wider than the inner sepals. The five petals are yellow, egg-shaped with the narrower end towards the base and 5.5–7.5 mm (0.22–0.30 in) long with a shallow notch at the tip. There are usually ten stamens, arranged on one side of, and leaning over the two densely softly-hairy carpels that each contain a two ovules. Flowering occurs from mid-September to early December.

== Taxonomy ==
Hibbertia microphylla was first formally described in 1845 by Ernst Gottlieb von Steudel in Johann Georg Christian Lehmann's Plantae Preissianae. The specific epithet (microphylla) means "small-leaved".

== Distribution and habitat ==
This hibbertia grows in kwongan, mallee-heath and forest in the Avon Wheatbelt Esperance Plains, Jarrah Forest Mallee and Warren biogeographic regions in the south-west of Western Australia.

== Conservation status ==
Hibbertia microphylla is classified as "not threatened" by the Western Australian Government Department of Parks and Wildlife.

== See also ==
- List of Hibbertia species
