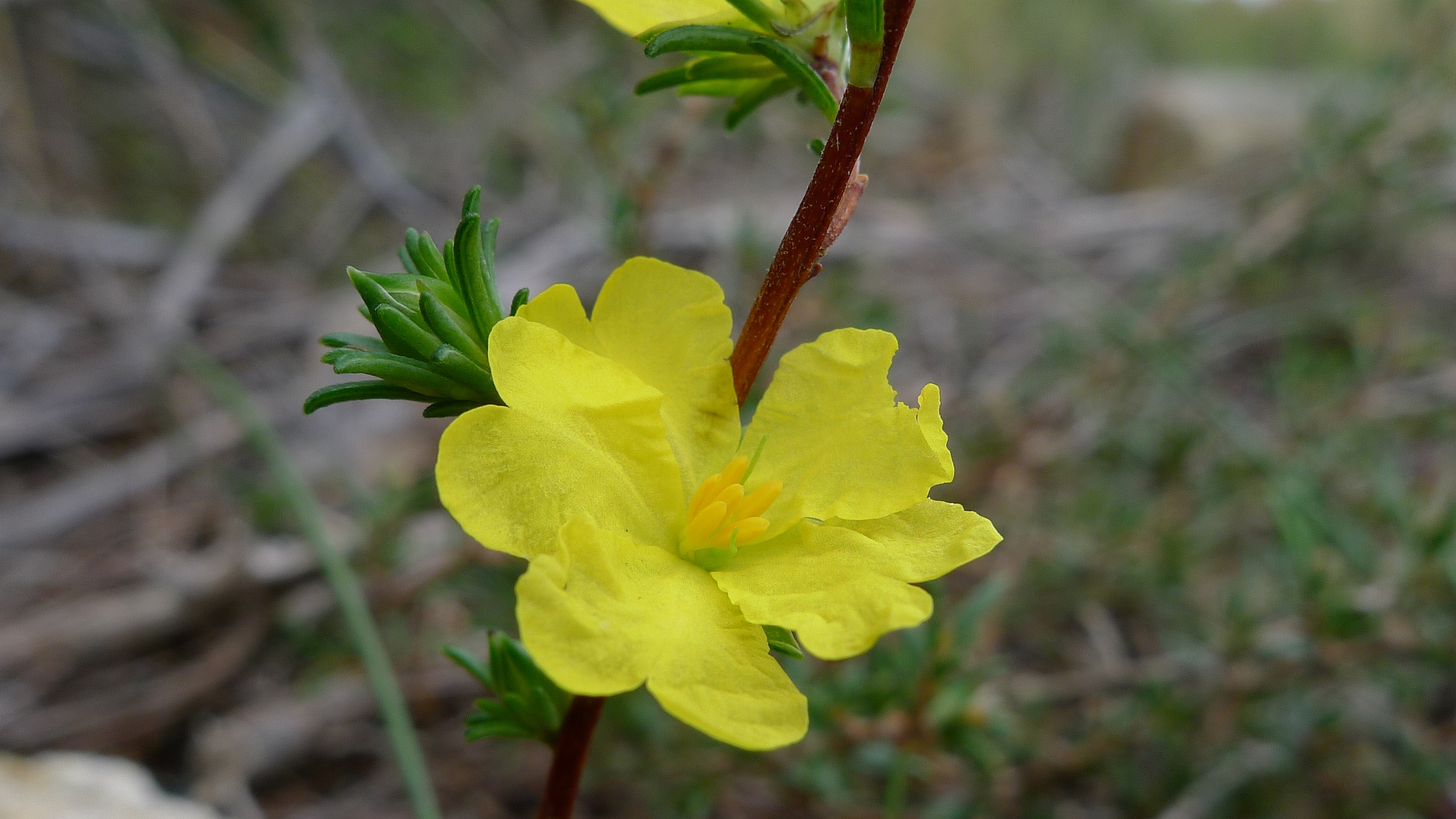

Scientific classification
- Kingdom: Plantae
- Clade: Tracheophytes
- Clade: Angiosperms
- Clade: Eudicots
- Order: Dilleniales
- Family: Dilleniaceae
- Genus: Hibbertia
- Species: H. fasciculata

Binomial name
- Hibbertia fasciculata R.Br. ex DC.

Synonyms
- List: Hibbertia camforosma (Sieber ex Spreng.) A.Gray; Hibbertia camphorosma A.Gray orth. var.; Hibbertia fasciculata f. adunca Gand.; Hibbertia fasciculata R.Br. ex DC. f. fasciculata; Hibbertia fasciculata f. spiceri Gand.; Hibbertia fasciculata R.Br. ex DC. var. fasciculata; Hibbertia fasciculata var. glabrata Hook.f.; Hibbertia fasciculata var. prostrata (Hook.) Hook.f.; Hibbertia fasciculata var. pubigera Benth.; Hibbertia prostrata Hook.; Hibbertia virgata Hook. nom. illeg.; Hibbertia virgata var. glabra Hook. ex Walp.; Hibbertia virgata var. pilosa Hook. ex Walp.; Pleurandra camforosma Sieber ex Spreng.

= Hibbertia fasciculata =

Species of flowering plant

Hibbertia fasciculata is a species of flowering plant in the family Dilleniaceae and is endemic to south-eastern Australia. It is a small erect to spreading shrub with glabrous stems except on new growth, narrow linear leaves, and yellow flowers arranged in leaf axils, with eight to twelve stamens surrounding three carpels.

== Description ==
Hibbertia fasciculata is an erect or sprawling shrub that typically grows to a height of up to 40 cm (16 in) with glabrous branches except on the new growth. The leaves are clustered, narrow linear, 4–6 mm (0.16–0.24 in) long and up to 0.5 mm (0.020 in) wide. The flowers are arranged singly in leaf axils and are sessile, with sepals 4–6 mm (0.16–0.24 in) long. The petals are yellow, 7–8 mm (0.28–0.31 in) long and there are from eight to twelve stamens arranged around the three glabrous carpels. Flowering occurs from September to December.

== Taxonomy ==
Hibbertia fasciculata was first formally described in 1817 by Augustin Pyramus de Candolle in his Regni Vegetabilis Systema Naturale from an unpublished description by Robert Brown. The specific epithet (fasciculata) means "crowded".

In Victoria, this species is known as H. fasciculata var. prostrata, although the plant is rarely prostrate in that state. In South Australia and Tasmania, it is known as Hibbertia prostrata.

== Distribution and habitat ==
This hibbertia grows in heath and forest in Queensland, coastal areas of New South Wales, south-eastern South Australia and Tasmania. It is widely distributed in Victoria where it is known as Hibbertia fasciculata var. prostrata.

== Conservation status ==
Hibbertia fasciculata is listed as of "least concern" under the Queensland Government Nature Conservation Act 1992.
