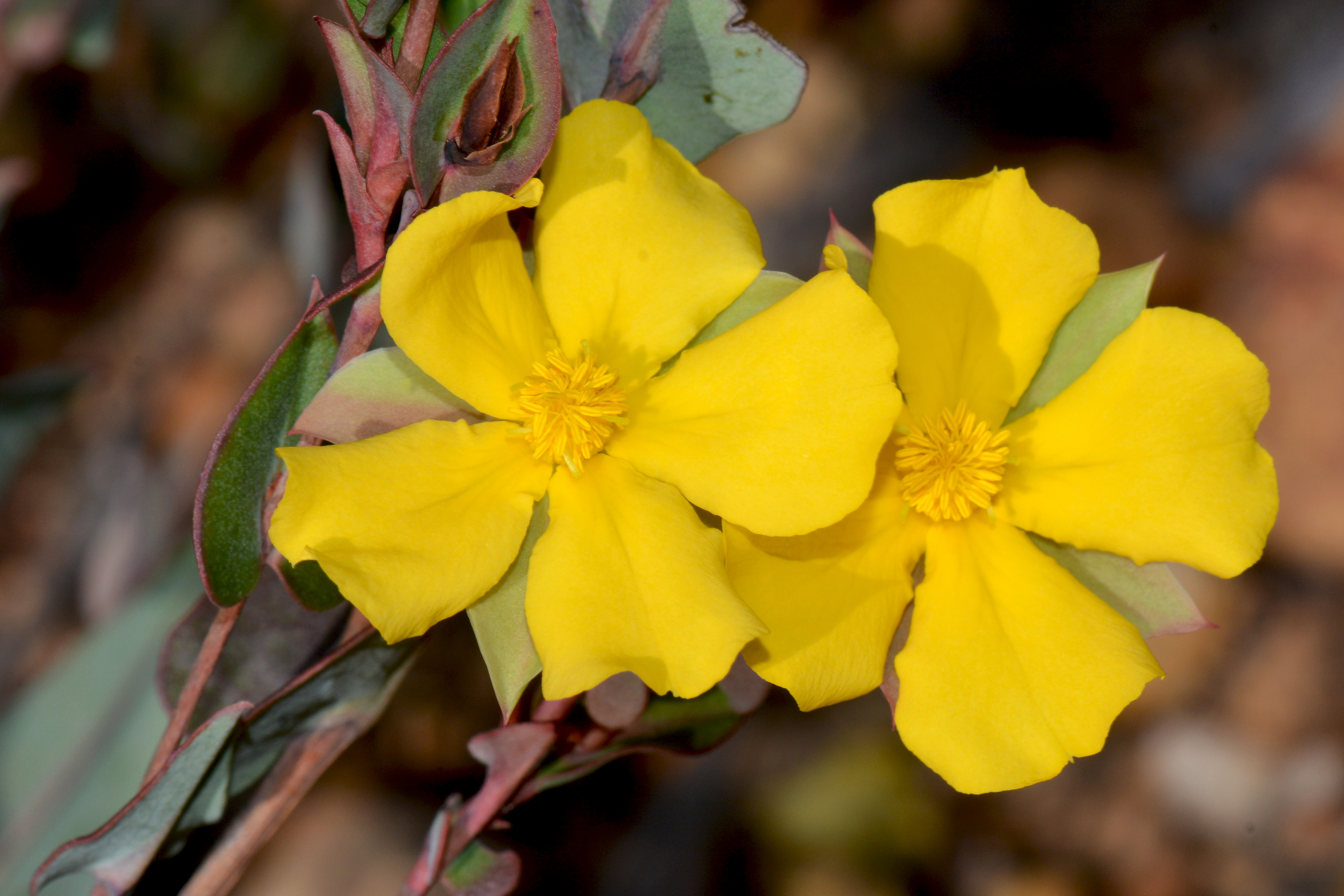

Scientific classification
- Kingdom: Plantae
- Clade: Embryophytes
- Clade: Tracheophytes
- Clade: Spermatophytes
- Clade: Angiosperms
- Clade: Eudicots
- Order: Dilleniales
- Family: Dilleniaceae
- Genus: Hibbertia
- Species: H. amplexicaulis

Binomial name
- Hibbertia amplexicaulis Steud.

= Hibbertia amplexicaulis =

Species of flowering plant

Hibbertia amplexicaulis is a species of flowering plant in the family Dilleniaceae and is endemic to Western Australia. It is a prostrate, sprawling, straggling or ascending shrub that typically grows to a height of 0.1–0.6 m (3.9 in – 1 ft 11.6 in), rarely as tall as 1 m (3 ft 3 in). It blooms between August and March producing yellow flowers. It was first formally described in 1845 by Ernst Gottlieb von Steudel in Lehmann's Plantae Preissianae. The specific epithet (amplexicaulis) means "stem-clasping", referring to the leaves.

This species is found throughout the Peel, southern Wheatbelt, South West and Great Southern regions of Western Australia in coastal areas, swamps and ridges where it grows in sandy lateritic or granitic soils, often over limestone.

This species was revised in 2024.

== See also ==
- List of Hibbertia species
