= Hibbertia serpyllifolia =

Scientific classification
- Kingdom: Plantae
- Clade: Tracheophytes
- Clade: Angiosperms
- Clade: Eudicots
- Order: Dilleniales
- Family: Dilleniaceae
- Genus: Hibbertia
- Species: H. serpyllifolia

Binomial name
- Hibbertia serpyllifolia R.Br. ex DC.

Synonyms
- Hibbertia serpyllifolia R.Br. ex DC. var. serpyllifolia

Species of flowering plant

Hibbertia serpyllifolia is a species of flowering plant in the family Dilleniaceae and is endemic to Queensland. It is a small, spreading to low-lying shrub with many stems, oblong leaves and single yellow flowers on the ends of branches, with twelve to twenty stamens in groups around three hairy carpels.

== Description ==
Hibbertia serpyllifolia is an erect to spreading or low-lying shrub with many stems and that typically grows to a height of 0.5 m (1 ft 8 in), sometimes to 1 m (3 ft 3 in) with sparsely hairy branches. The leaves are oblong, mostly 4–8 mm (0.16–0.31 in) long and 1–2 mm (0.039–0.079 in) wide on a petiole 0.2–0.5 mm (0.0079–0.0197 in) long and with the edges rolled under. The flowers are arranged in the ends of branches on a peduncle up to 4 mm (0.16 in) long with bracts 2.5–3.0 mm (0.098–0.118 in) long. The sepals are sparsely hairy, the outer sepal lobes 5.5–7.5 mm (0.22–0.30 in) long and 2.6–3.7 mm (0.10–0.15 in) wide, the inner lobes broader. The petals are yellow, egg-shaped with the narrower end towards the base, and up to 12 mm (0.47 in) long with twelve to twenty stamens in groups around the three hairy carpels, each carpel with four ovules. Flowering occurs from July to October.

== Taxonomy ==
Hibbertia serpyllifolia was first formally described by Augustin Pyramus de Candolle in his Regni Vegetabilis Systema Naturale from an unpublished description by Robert Brown. Previously broadly defined and considered conspecific with Hibbertia ericifolia and thought to occur across eastern Australia to Tasmania, it is now recognised as only occurring in central Queensland.

== Distribution and habitat ==
This hibbertia grows in heath, grassland and the understorey of coastal forests in the Port Curtis region in mid-northern Queensland.

== Conservation status ==
Hibbertia serpyllifolia is listed as of "least concern" under the Queensland Government Nature Conservation Act 1992.
