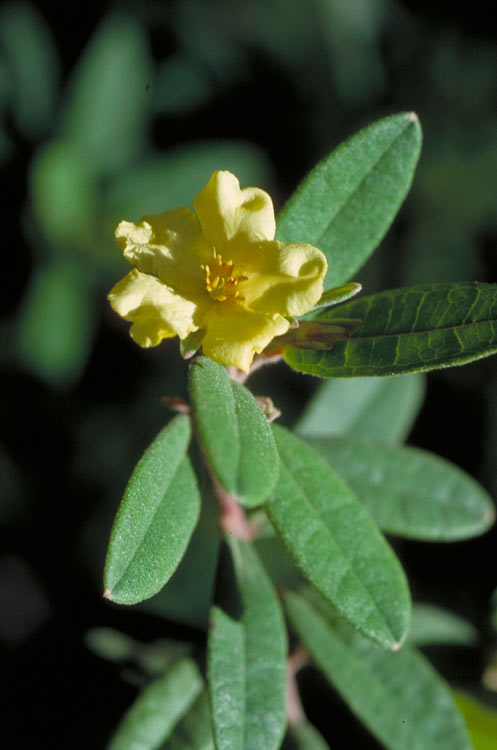

Scientific classification
- Kingdom: Plantae
- Clade: Tracheophytes
- Clade: Angiosperms
- Clade: Eudicots
- Order: Dilleniales
- Family: Dilleniaceae
- Genus: Hibbertia
- Species: H. melhanioides

Binomial name
- Hibbertia melhanioides F.Muell.

= Hibbertia melhanioides =

Species of plant

Hibbertia melhanioides is a species of flowering plant in the family Dilleniaceae and is endemic to north Queensland. It is a shrub with hairy foliage, oblong to elliptic or lance-shaped leaves, and yellow flowers with more than about 25 to 30 stamens and up to eight staminodes arranged around three carpels.

== Description ==
Hibbertia melhanioides is a shrub that typically grows up to 1 m (3 ft 3 in) tall and 2 m (6 ft 7 in) wide with spreading, hairy branches. The leaves are oblong to elliptic or lance-shaped with the narrower end towards the base, 25–50 mm (0.98–1.97 in) long and 10–20 mm (0.39–0.79 in) wide on a petiole 0.8–2 mm (0.031–0.079 in) long. The flowers are usually arranged singly in leaf axils near the ends of the branches on a peduncle 10–26 mm (0.39–1.02 in) long. There are elliptic to spatula-shaped bracts 4.7–6.3 mm (0.19–0.25 in) long at the base of the flowers. The five sepals are joined at the base, the three outer lobes 9.5–10 mm (0.37–0.39 in) long and the inner lobes 7.5–8.5 mm (0.30–0.33 in) long. The five petals are egg-shaped with the narrower end towards the base, yellow, up to 9.8–13.3 mm (0.39–0.52 in) long usually with about 25 to 30 stamens and up to eight staminodes arranged around three carpels, each carpel with three or four ovules.

== Taxonomy ==
Hibbertia melhanioides was first formally described in 1864 by Ferdinand von Mueller in Fragmenta phytographiae Australiae from specimens collected by John Dallachy near Rockingham Bay in 1864. The specific epithet (melhanioides) means "Melhania-like".

In 1928, Karel Domin described two varieties of Hibbertia melhanioides in the journal Bibliotheca Botanica and the names are accepted by the Australian Plant Census:

- Hibbertia melhanioides var. baileyana Domin;
- Hibbertia melhanioides F.Muell. var. melhanioides.

== Distribution and habitat ==
This hibbertia grows in forest on mountain slopes at altitudes up to 1,200 m (3,900 ft), along the coast of Queensland from north of Ingham to south of Gordonvale.

== See also ==
- List of Hibbertia species
