= Neodillenia coussapoana =

Scientific classification
- Kingdom: Plantae
- Clade: Embryophytes
- Clade: Tracheophytes
- Clade: Angiosperms
- Clade: Eudicots
- Order: Dilleniales
- Family: Dilleniaceae
- Genus: Neodillenia
- Species: N. coussapoana

Binomial name
- Neodillenia coussapoana Aymard

Species of flowering plant

Neodillenia coussapoana is a plant in the Dilleniaceae family. It grows from Colombia to Ecuador.
