= Hibbertia arnhemica =

Scientific classification
- Kingdom: Plantae
- Clade: Embryophytes
- Clade: Tracheophytes
- Clade: Spermatophytes
- Clade: Angiosperms
- Clade: Eudicots
- Order: Dilleniales
- Family: Dilleniaceae
- Genus: Hibbertia
- Species: H. arnhemica

Binomial name
- Hibbertia arnhemica S.T.Reynolds

Species of flowering plant

Hibbertia arnhemica is a species of flowering plant in the family Dilleniaceae and is endemic to Arnhem Land in the Northern Territory. It is an erect shrub with hairy branchlets, egg-shaped or elliptic leaves and spikes of eight to fifteen yellow flowers, each with twenty to thirty stamens arranged on one side of the two carpels.

== Description ==
Hibbertia arnhemica is a shrub that typically grows to a height of up to 1 m (3 ft 3 in), its branchlets densely hairy. The leaves are egg-shaped to elliptic, 63–71 mm (2.5–2.8 in) long and 3–45 mm (0.12–1.77 in) wide on a petiole 0.5–3 mm (0.020–0.118 in) long, the lower surface of the leaves densely hairy and much paler than the upper surface. The flowers are tightly arranged in spikes of eight to fifteen on the ends of branchlets on a thick peduncle 11–27 mm (0.43–1.06 in) long, with egg-shaped to elliptic bracts 13–21 mm (0.51–0.83 in) long. Each flower is 34–45 mm (1.3–1.8 in) in diameter, the outer sepals larger than the inner ones. The five petals are egg-shaped with the narrower end towards the base, yellow, 18–23 mm (0.71–0.91 in) long and there are twenty to thirty stamens arranged on one side of the two carpels, each carpel with two or three ovules. Flowering occurs in most months.

== Taxonomy ==
Hibbertia arnhemica was first formally described in 1991 by Sally T. Reynolds in the journal Austrobaileya from specimens collected by Mike Lazarides near Mount Howship near the East Alligator River in 1972. The specific epithet (arnhemica) refers to the area where this species is endemic.

== Distribution and habitat ==
This hibbertia grows in woodland on permanently wet, sandy soil in Arnhem Land.

== Conservation status ==
Goodenia arnhemica is classified as of "least concern" under the Northern Territory Government Territory Parks and Wildlife Conservation Act 1976.

== See also ==
- List of Hibbertia species
