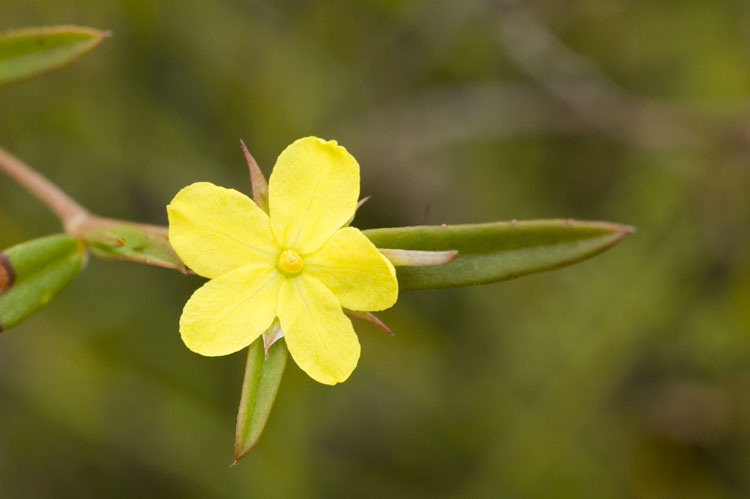

Scientific classification
- Kingdom: Plantae
- Clade: Embryophytes
- Clade: Tracheophytes
- Clade: Angiosperms
- Clade: Eudicots
- Order: Dilleniales
- Family: Dilleniaceae
- Genus: Hibbertia
- Species: H. salicifolia

Binomial name
- Hibbertia salicifolia (DC.) F.Muell.

Synonyms
- Adrastaea salicifolia DC.; Adrastea salicifolia Spreng.

= Hibbertia salicifolia =

Erect guinea flower

Species of plant

Hibbertia salicifolia is a species of flowering plant in the family Dilleniaceae and is endemic to eastern Australia. It is a shrub with loose reddish bark, linear to oblong leaves and yellow flowers with the stamens arranged all around the carpels.

== Description ==
Hibbertia salicifolia is an erect, relatively large shrub with all but its youngest branchlets covered with loose, reddish bark. The leaves are linear to oblong, 15–50 mm (0.59–1.97 in) long and 2–5 mm (0.079–0.197 in) wide on a petiole 1–2 mm (0.039–0.079 in) long. The flowers are 12–15 mm (0.47–0.59 in) wide, arranged in leaf axils and are more or less sessile. The five sepals are joined at the base, 4–6 mm (0.16–0.24 in) long and the petals are yellow and 7–9 mm (0.28–0.35 in) long with the stamens arranged all around the more or less glabrous carpels. Flowering occurs from spring to early autumn.

== Taxonomy ==
This species was first formally described in 1817 by Augustin Pyramus de Candolle in Regni Vegetabilis Systema Naturale and given the name Adrastaea salicifolia from specimens collected near Botany Bay. In 1859, Ferdinand von Mueller changed the name to Hibbertia salicifolia in Fragmenta Phytographiae Australiae. The specific epithet (salicifolia) means "willow-leaved".

== Distribution and habitat ==
Hibbertia salicifolia grows in coastal swamps and heath from south-east Queensland to the Royal National Park in New South Wales.
