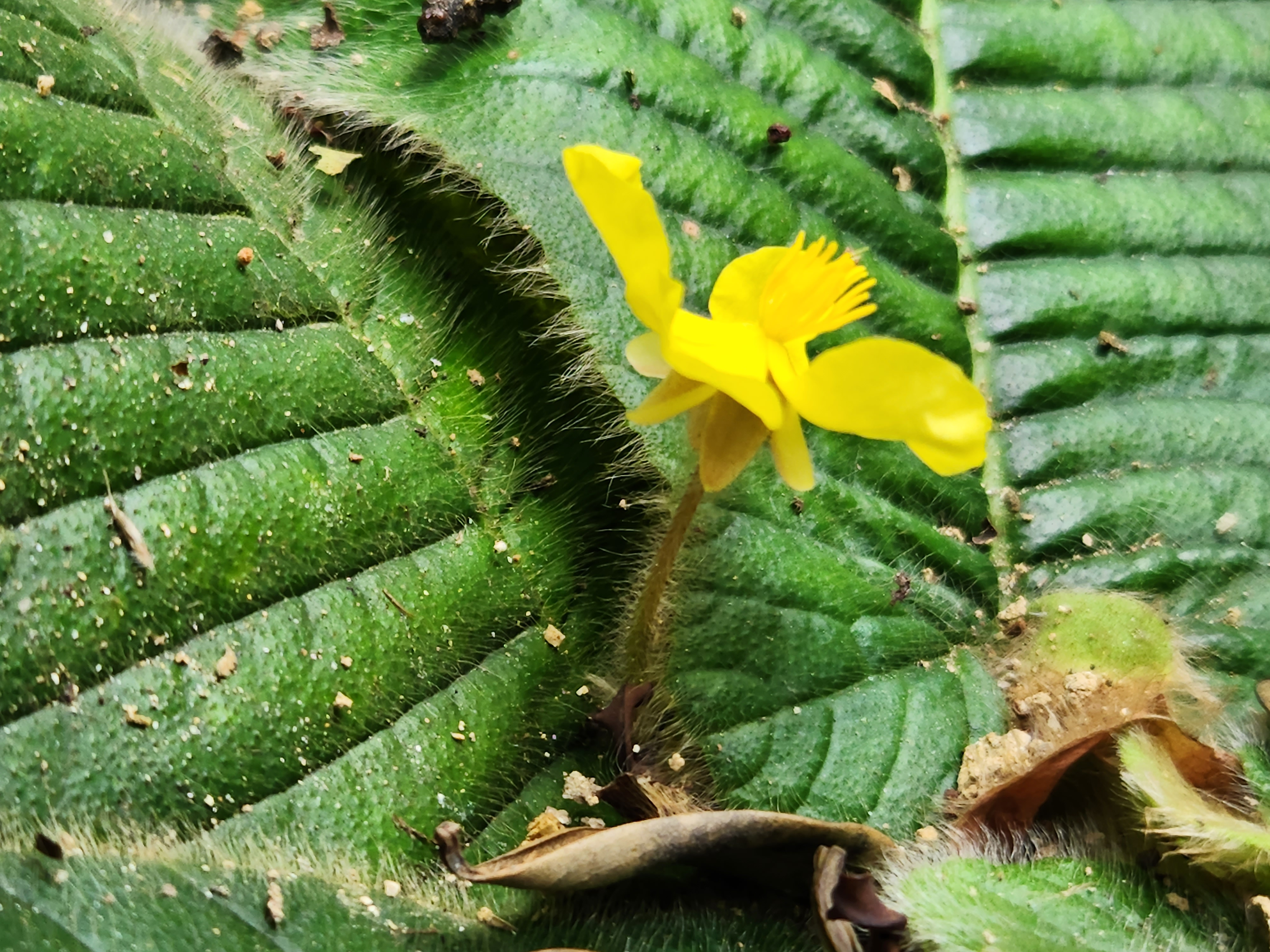

Scientific classification
- Kingdom: Plantae
- Clade: Tracheophytes
- Clade: Angiosperms
- Clade: Eudicots
- Order: Dilleniales
- Family: Dilleniaceae
- Genus: Acrotrema
- Species: A. arnottianum

Binomial name
- Acrotrema arnottianum Wight, 1840

= Acrotrema arnottianum =

Species of flowering plant

Acrotrema arnottianum is a flowering plant belonging to the family Dilleniaceae. It is native to Kerala and Tamil Nadu.

== Description ==
The species is a perennial herb with short stem and obovate leaves. Flowers are bisexual and have yellow petals. Fruits are follicules with glossy seeds.
