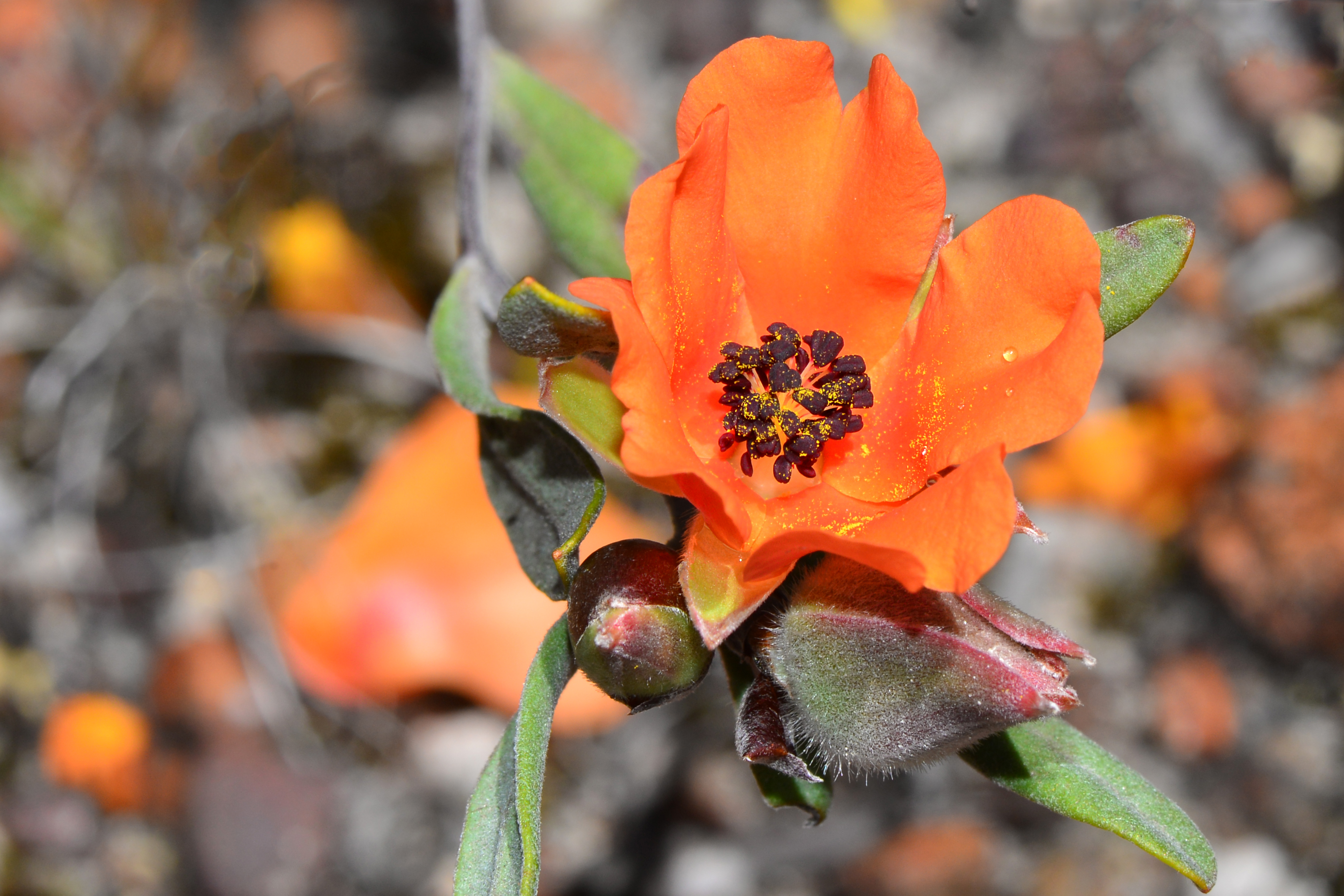

Scientific classification
- Kingdom: Plantae
- Clade: Tracheophytes
- Clade: Angiosperms
- Clade: Eudicots
- Order: Dilleniales
- Family: Dilleniaceae
- Genus: Hibbertia
- Species: H. miniata

Binomial name
- Hibbertia miniata C.A.Gardner

= Hibbertia miniata =

Orange flower

Species of flowering plant

Hibbertia miniata, commonly known as orange flower, is a small species of shrub in the family Dilleniaceae and is endemic to Western Australia.

== Description ==
Hibbertia miniata is either an erect small shrub or grows horizontally along the ground and 0.1–1 m (3.9 in – 3 ft 3.4 in) high and rounded in outline. The leaves are lance-shaped, broader and rounded at the apex, sessile, 3–3.5 cm (1.2–1.4 in) long, 4–7 mm (0.16–0.28 in) wide, densely covered with grey short, soft, matted hairs or soft, silky hairs. The leaf edges rolled under, becoming more pronounced as they dry. The mid-rib on the underside prominent. The dry flower bracts are broad, brown, egg-shaped to lance egg-shaped, concave, smooth and acute at the apex. The peduncles are smooth with very short silky hairs. The sepals are lance to egg-shaped, 1–1.2 cm (0.39–0.47 in) long, silky with white, soft, flattened hairs and sharply pointed. The large orange to reddish-orange flower petals are egg-shaped, deeply lobed, 2 cm (0.79 in) long and 1.5 cm (0.59 in) wide. The flowers are borne singly or in small groups at the end of the branches on a short stalk. Flowering occurs from August to November.

== Taxonomy and naming ==
Hibbertia miniata was first formally described in 1936 by Charles Austin Gardner and the description was published in Journal of the Royal Society of Western Australia. The species name (miniata) is a Latin word meaning "flame-scarlet".

== Distribution and habitat ==
Orange flower hibbertia has a restricted distribution, grows in gravelly lateritic soils in Chittering, Gingin, Moora, Toodyay and Victoria Plains.
