= Hibbertia australis =

Scientific classification
- Kingdom: Plantae
- Clade: Tracheophytes
- Clade: Angiosperms
- Clade: Eudicots
- Order: Dilleniales
- Family: Dilleniaceae
- Genus: Hibbertia
- Species: H. australis

Binomial name
- Hibbertia australis N.A.Wakef.

Species of flowering plant

Hibbertia australis is a species of flowering plant in the family Dilleniaceae and is endemic to south-eastern continental Australia. It is an erect to spreading shrub with linear leaves and yellow flowers with four to nine stamens arranged in a single cluster.

== Description ==
Hibbertia australis is an erect to spreading shrub that typically grows to a height of up to 60 cm (24 in), the young branchlets with star-shaped hairs. The leaves are linear, 4–16 mm (0.16–0.63 in) long and 1–2 mm (0.039–0.079 in) wide and sessile or on a petiole up to 0.7 mm (0.028 in) long. The flowers are arranged on the ends of branchlets or short side shoots on peduncles 5–18 mm (0.20–0.71 in) long. There are one or two linear to lance-shaped bracts 3–4 mm (0.12–0.16 in) long at the base of the peduncle. The sepals are 6–7.5 mm (0.24–0.30 in) long the petals are yellow, 6–9 mm (0.24–0.35 in) long. There are four to nine stamens in a single cluster on one side of the felty-hairy carpels. Flowering occurs between September and December.

== Taxonomy ==
Hibbertia australis was first formally described in 1955 by Norman Arthur Wakefield in The Victorian Naturalist from specimens collected at Marcus Hill in 1884. The specific epithet (australis) means "southern".

== Distribution and habitat ==
This hibbertia usually grows in heath or woodland and occurs in southern and western Victoria and as far west as the Eyre Peninsula in South Australia.

== See also ==
- List of Hibbertia species
