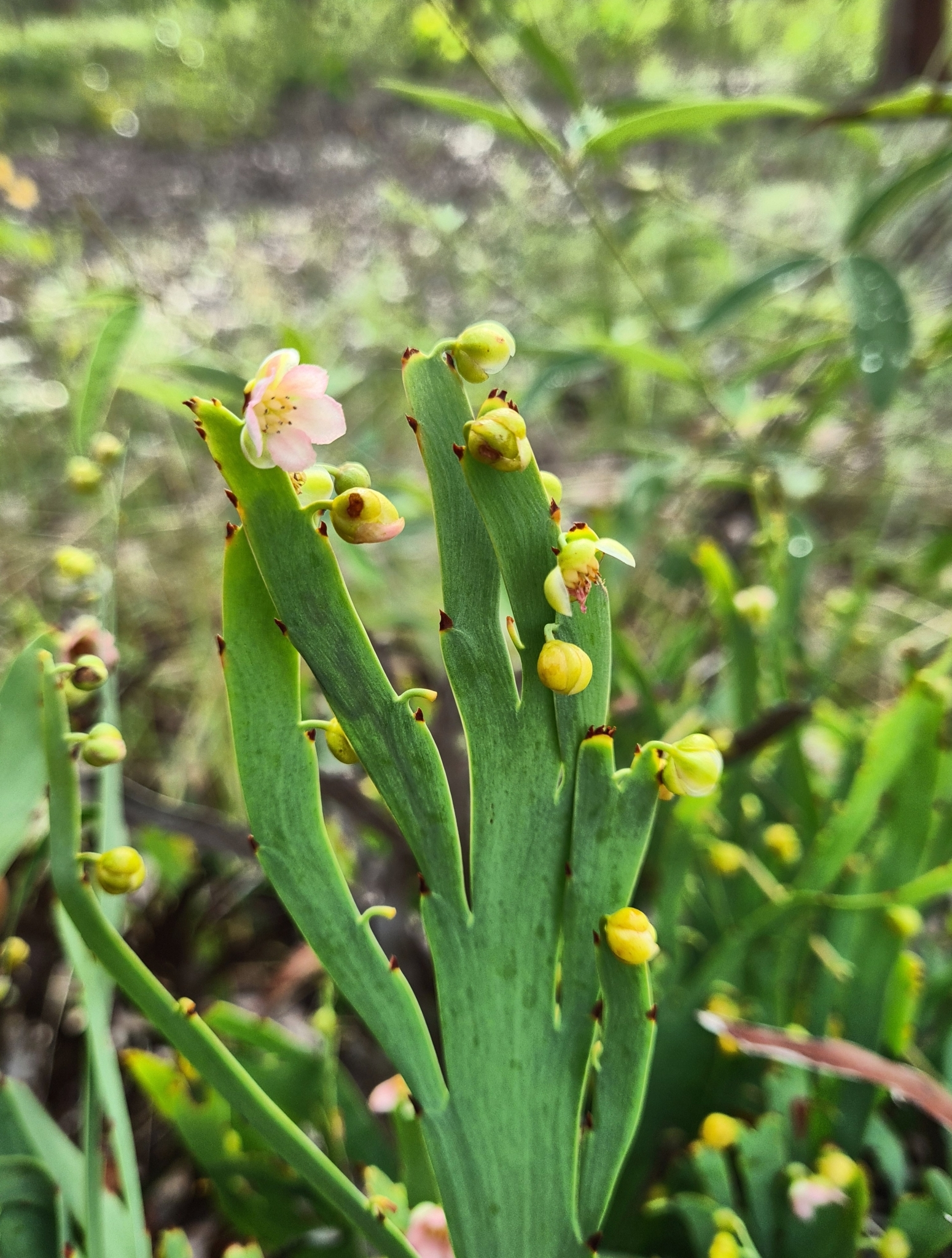
- Near Pine Creek

Scientific classification
- Kingdom: Plantae
- Clade: Tracheophytes
- Clade: Angiosperms
- Clade: Eudicots
- Order: Dilleniales
- Family: Dilleniaceae
- Genus: Hibbertia
- Species: H. dilatata

Binomial name
- Hibbertia dilatata (R.Br. ex DC.) J.W.Horn

Synonyms
- Pachynema complanatum R.Br. ex DC.

= Hibbertia dilatata =

Species of plant

Hibbertia dilatata is a species of flowering plant in the family Dilleniaceae and is endemic to the Northern Territory. It is a sub-shrub with flattened stems and pale to bright pink, purplish or white flowers with seven to ten stamens.

== Description ==
Hibbertia dilatata is a rhizome-forming sub-shrub that typically grows to a height of up to 1.0 m (3 ft 3 in) and has flattened branchlets mostly 5–20 mm (0.20–0.79 in) wide. Each flowers is on a peduncle 1.5–6 mm (0.059–0.236 in) long and has sepals of unequal lengths, varying from 4 to 7 mm (0.16 to 0.28 in) long. The five petals are pale to bright pink, purplish or white, 4–6 mm (0.16–0.24 in) long with wavy edges. There are between seven and ten stamens and two staminodes. Flowering occurs throughout the year.

== Taxonomy ==
This species was first formally described in 1863 by George Bentham in Flora Australiensis and given the name Pachynema dilatatum from a specimen collected by Ferdinand von Mueller on the Macadam Range. In 2009, James W. Horn changed the name to Hibbertia dilatata in the International Journal of Plant Sciences on the basis of phylogenetic studies.

== Distribution and habitat ==
Hibbertia dilatata grows in woodland usually on shallow sandy soil in the northern part of the Northern Territory.

== Conservation status ==
Hibbertia dilatata is classified as of "least concern" under the Northern Territory Government Territory Parks and Wildlife Conservation Act 1976.

== See also ==
- List of Hibbertia species
