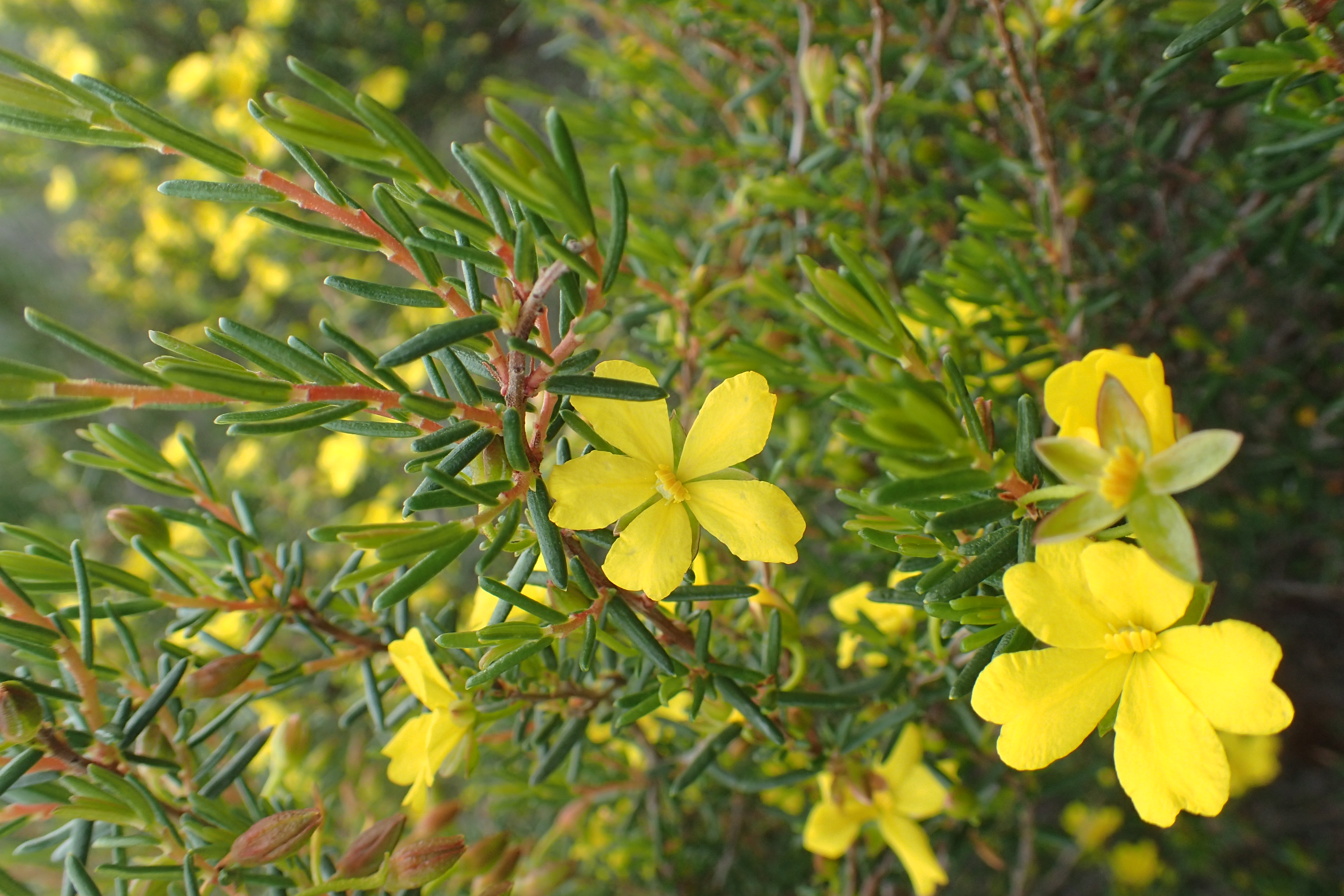

Scientific classification
- Kingdom: Plantae
- Clade: Tracheophytes
- Clade: Angiosperms
- Clade: Eudicots
- Order: Dilleniales
- Family: Dilleniaceae
- Genus: Hibbertia
- Species: H. gracilipes

Binomial name
- Hibbertia gracilipes Steud.

= Hibbertia gracilipes =

Species of flowering plant

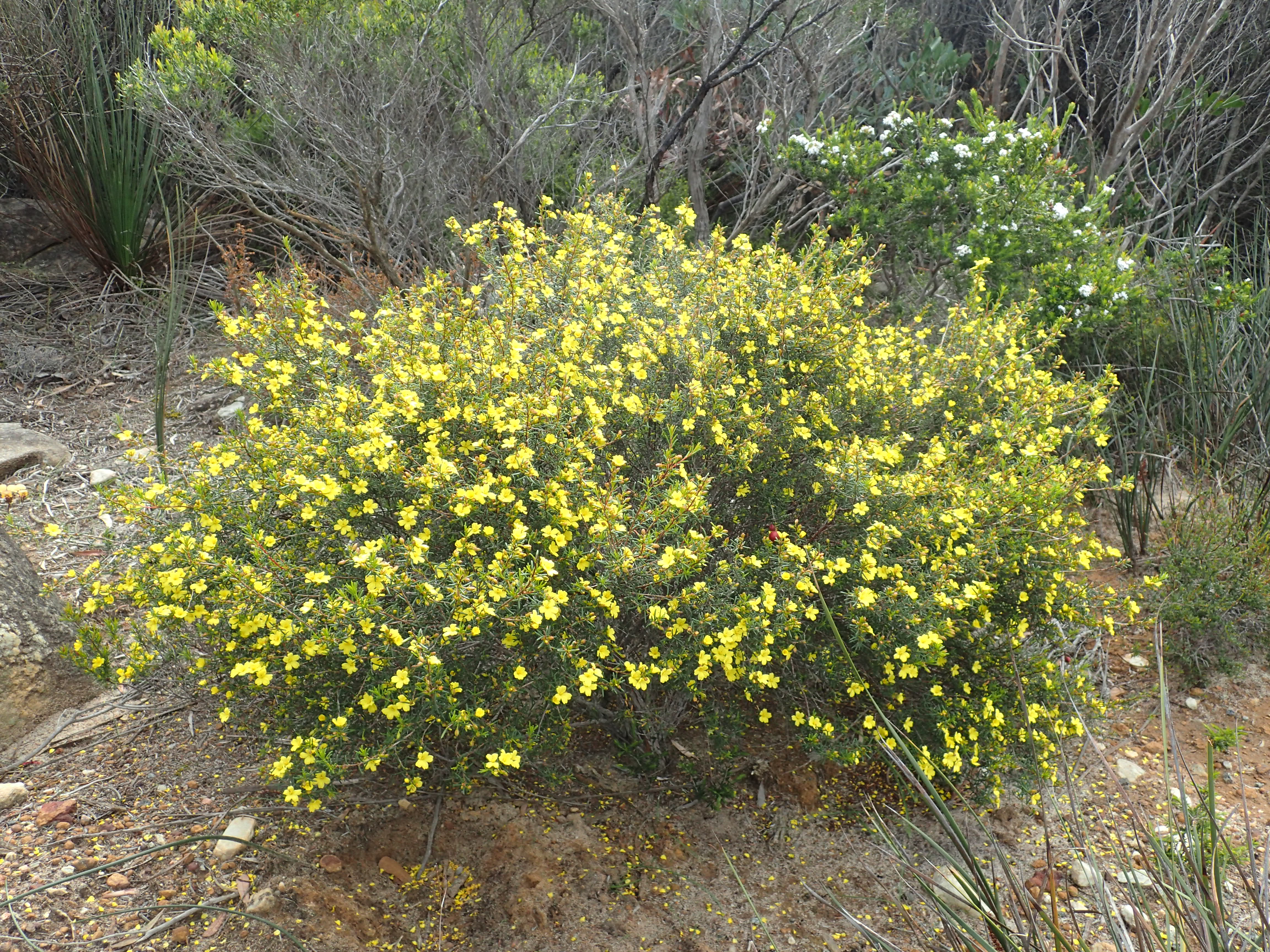
Habit on the east side of East Mount Barren

Hibbertia gracilipes is a species of flowering plant in the family Dilleniaceae and is endemic to the south-west of Western Australia. It is an erect, multi-stemmed shrub that typically grows to a height of 15–60 cm (5.9–23.6 in). It blooms between March and December producing yellow flowers. First formally described in 1863 by George Bentham in Flora Australiensis, the specific epithet (gracilipes) means "thin foot", referring to the peduncles.

This species is found in the Avon Wheatbelt, Coolgardie, Esperance Plains, Jarrah Forest and Mallee biogeographic regions in the south-west of Western Australia where it grows on rocky hillsides and sandplains.

== See also ==
- List of Hibbertia species
