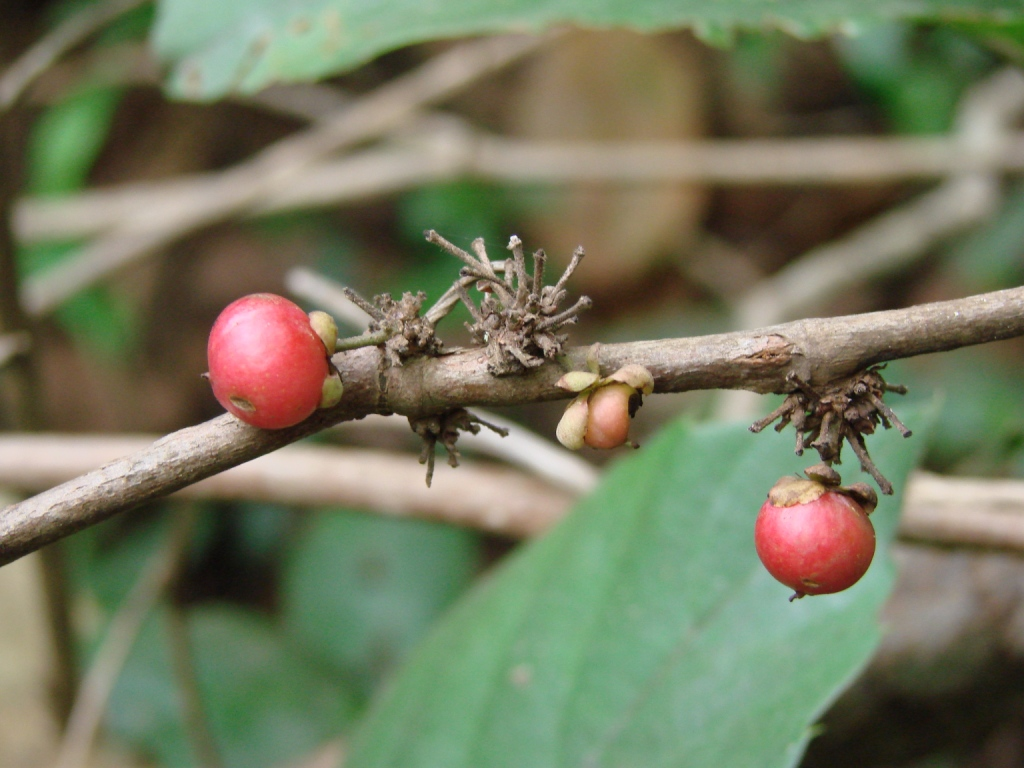
- Doliocarpus brevipedicellatus

Scientific classification
- Kingdom: Plantae
- Clade: Tracheophytes
- Clade: Angiosperms
- Clade: Eudicots
- Order: Dilleniales
- Family: Dilleniaceae
- Genus: Doliocarpus; Rol.

Synonyms
- Calinea Aubl.; Mappia Schreb.; Othlis Schott; Pinzona Mart. & Zucc.; Rhinium Schreb.; Ricaurtea Triana; Soramia Aubl.; Tigarea Aubl.

= Doliocarpus =

Genus of flowering plants

Doliocarpus is a genus of flowering plants in the family Dilleniaceae, native to Central and South America.

== Selected species ==
Species include:

- Doliocarpus amazonicus Sleumer
- Doliocarpus aracaensis Aymard
- Doliocarpus areolatus Kubitzki
- Doliocarpus aureobaccatus Aymard
- Doliocarpus aureobaccus G.A. Aymard
- Doliocarpus brevipedicellatus Garcke
- Doliocarpus carnevaliorum Aymard
- Doliocarpus chocoensis Aymard
- Doliocarpus dasyanthus Kubitzki
- Doliocarpus dentatus (Aubl.) Standl.
- Doliocarpus dressleri Aymard
- Doliocarpus duckeanus (Kubitzki) Aymard & Monzoli
- Doliocarpus elegans Eichler
- Doliocarpus elliptifolius Kubitzki
- Doliocarpus foreroi Aymard
- Doliocarpus gentryi Aymard & J.Mill.
- Doliocarpus glomeratus Eichler
- Doliocarpus gracilis Kubitzki
- Doliocarpus grandiflorus Eichler
- Doliocarpus guianensis (Aubl.) Gilg
- Doliocarpus herrerae Pérez Camacho
- Doliocarpus hilarianus (Kubitzki) Aymard
- Doliocarpus hispidobaccatus Aymard
- Doliocarpus hispidus Standl. & L.O.Williams
- Doliocarpus humboldtianus Aymard
- Doliocarpus kubitzkii Aymard
- Doliocarpus lancifolius Kubitzki
- Doliocarpus leiophyllus Kubitzki
- Doliocarpus liesneri Aymard
- Doliocarpus littoralis (Kubitzki) Fraga & Stehmann
- Doliocarpus lombardii Aymard
- Doliocarpus lopez-palacii Aymard
- Doliocarpus macrocarpus Mart. ex Eichler
- Doliocarpus magnificus Sleumer
- Doliocarpus major J.F.Gmel.
- Doliocarpus multiflorus Standl.
- Doliocarpus nitidus (Triana) Triana & Planch.
- Doliocarpus novogranatensis Kubitzki
- Doliocarpus olivaceus Sprague & R.O.Williams ex G.E.Hunter
- Doliocarpus ortegae Aymard
- Doliocarpus paraensis Sleumer
- Doliocarpus paucinervis Kubitzki
- Doliocarpus pipolyi Aymard
- Doliocarpus prancei Kubitzki
- Doliocarpus pruskii Aymard
- Doliocarpus sagolianus Kubitzki
- Doliocarpus savannarum Sandwith
- Doliocarpus schottianus Eichler
- Doliocarpus schultesianus Aymard
- Doliocarpus sellowianus Eichler
- Doliocarpus sessiliflorus Mart.
- Doliocarpus spatulifolius Kubitzki
- Doliocarpus spraguei Cheesman
- Doliocarpus subandinus Aymard
- Doliocarpus triananus Aymard
- Doliocarpus validus Kubitzki
- Doliocarpus verruculosus Kubitzki
