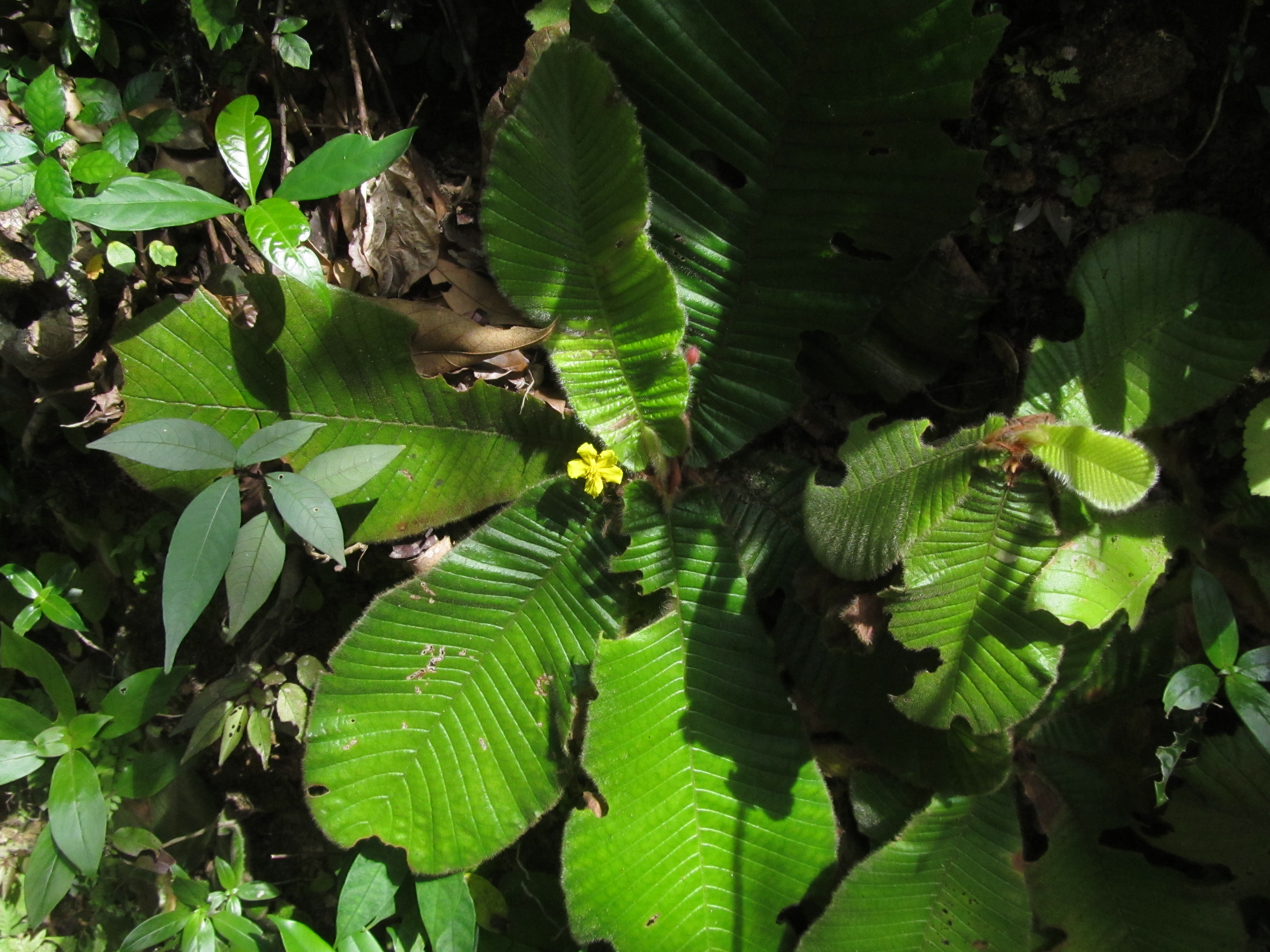
- Acrotrema arnottianum

Scientific classification
- Kingdom: Plantae
- Clade: Embryophytes
- Clade: Tracheophytes
- Clade: Spermatophytes
- Clade: Angiosperms
- Clade: Eudicots
- Order: Dilleniales
- Family: Dilleniaceae
- Genus: Acrotrema; Jack

Species
- see text

= Acrotrema =

Genus of flowering plants

Acrotrema is a genus of flowering plants in the family Dilleniaceae. It is found in South Asia in India, Malaysia, Myanmar, Sri Lanka, and Thailand.

== Species ==
- Acrotrema agastyamalayanum E.S.S.Kumar, Dan & G.M.Nair
- Acrotrema arnottianum Wight
- Acrotrema costatum Jack
- Acrotrema dissectum Thwaites
- Acrotrema intermedium Thwaites
- Acrotrema lanceolatum Hook.
- Acrotrema lyratum Thwaites
- Acrotrema thwaitesii Hook.f. & Thomson
- Acrotrema uniflorum Hook.
- Acrotrema walkeri Wight ex Thwaites
