= Neodillenia =

Scientific classification
- Kingdom: Plantae
- Clade: Tracheophytes
- Clade: Angiosperms
- Clade: Eudicots
- Order: Dilleniales
- Family: Dilleniaceae
- Genus: Neodillenia; Aymard

Genus of flowering plant

Neodillenia is a genus of flowering plants belonging to the family Dilleniaceae.

Its native range is southern Tropical America. It is found in northern Brazil, Colombia, Ecuador, Peru and Venezuela.

The genus name of Neodillenia is in honour of Johann Jacob Dillenius (1684–1747), a German born botanist, that moved to London and published several botany books. It was first described and published in Harvard Pap. Bot. Vol.10 on page 121 in 1997.

== Known species ==
According to Kew:

- Neodillenia coussapoana Aymard
- Neodillenia peruviana Aymard
- Neodillenia venezuelana Aymard
