= Didesmandra =

Scientific classification
- Kingdom: Plantae
- Clade: Tracheophytes
- Clade: Angiosperms
- Clade: Eudicots
- Order: Dilleniales
- Family: Dilleniaceae
- Genus: Didesmandra; Stapf
- Species: D. aspera

Binomial name
- Didesmandra aspera Stapf

Genus of plants

Didesmandra is a monotypic genus of flowering plants belonging to the family Dilleniaceae. The only species is Didesmandra aspera.

Its native range is Borneo.
