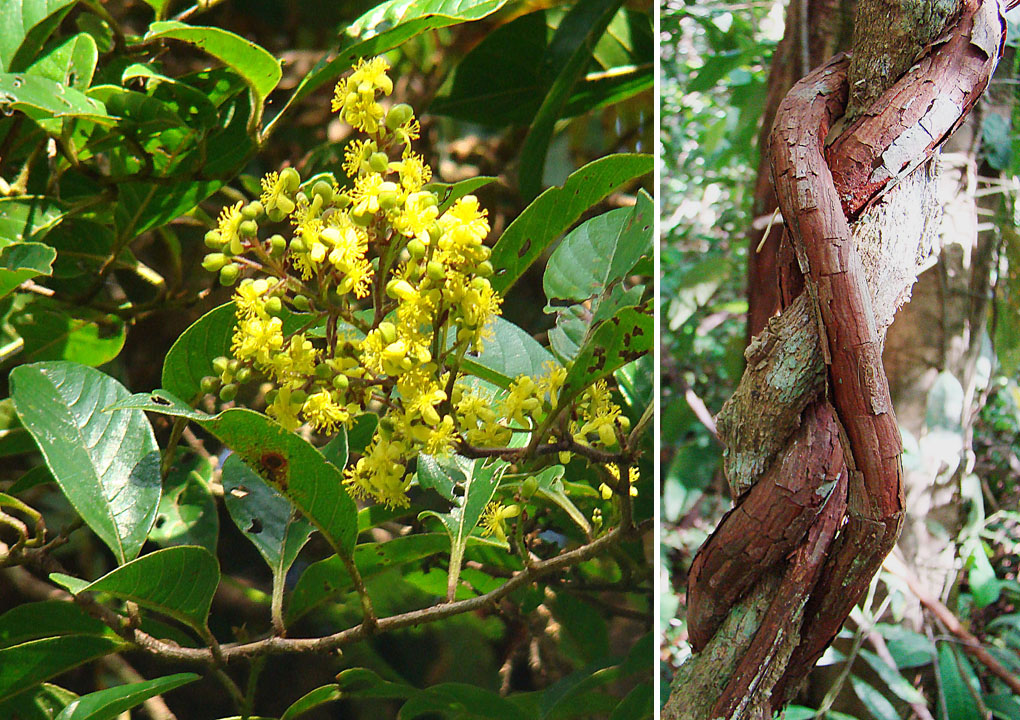
- Flower and stem of Davilla kunthii

Scientific classification
- Kingdom: Plantae
- Clade: Embryophytes
- Clade: Tracheophytes
- Clade: Spermatophytes
- Clade: Angiosperms
- Clade: Eudicots
- Order: Dilleniales
- Family: Dilleniaceae
- Genus: Davilla; Vand.

Type species
- Davilla rugosa Poir

Synonyms
- Hieronia Vell.

= Davilla (plant) =

Genus of flowering plants

Davilla is a genus of flowering plants belonging to the family Dilleniaceae. It has around 30 neotropical, species and is one of the most diverse genera of lianas, vines, erect or scandent (or climbing) shrubs.

== Description ==
Davilla plants are classed as lianas or shrubs, and they are similar in form to that of species in Tetracera or Dillenia genus. However, they can be identified from other Dilleniaceae genera plants due to several features; having sepals unequal in size, with the two inner ones larger, becoming crustaceous (having a hard shell) and covering the fruit completely, a paniculate inflorescence and the fruit being a capsule. They are hermaphroditic plants (or bisexual - bearing both male and female reproductive organs). It has leaves which are often scabrous (rough to the touch) and pubescent with simple trichomes (hairs or bristles). The petioles (leaf stalks) are winged to narrowly recurve-winged. The inflorescences panicles are terminal (at the end of branches) or axillary (at leaf junctions) in the upper nodes. The flower has 5 sepals, which are uneven. The 3 outer ones are small and 2 inners ones are larger. It has 3–6 petals, which are deciduous. It has numerous stamens and 1-2 carpels (female reproductive organ), which are capsular and contain 1 compartment. It has 2 ovules and erect and basal clavate (club-shaped) styles. It also has peltate (shield-like) and emarginate (notched at the apex) stigmas. The sepals later become leathery and begin enveloping the fruit, and simulating a globose shaped capsule. Inside the capsule, are 1-2 smooth seeds which are surrounded by an aril (a membranous or fleshy appendage).

Not much of the reproductive biology of the genus Davilla is known. Noting floral visitors, among reports concerning the genus Davilla, Ducke (1902) reported that bee species, Halictus Latreille had visited the flowers of Davilla rugosa Poir. Kuhlmann & Kühn in 1947 indicated bees and other insects were listed as pollinators of Davilla rugosa. Croat in 1978, then verified flowers of Davilla nitida (Vahl) Kubitzki were being visited by (stingless bee species) Partamona cupira Smith 1863.

== Taxonomy ==
The genus name of Davilla is either named in honour of Pedro Franco Dávila (1711–1786), a Peruvian and Spanish naturalist and collector, or according to George Don in 1831, Henry Catherine Davilla (Enrico Caterino Davila) an Italian historian who died in 1599.

The genus was first published and described by Domenico Vandelli in Fl. Lusit. Brasil. Spec. collation 35 in 1788. It was then reprinted in Script. Pl. Hispan. (edited by J.J. Roemer), Vol.115 in 1796.

The type species is Davilla rugosa Poir.

The taxonomy of the genus Davilla was revised in 2012.

== Species known ==
According to Kew;

- Davilla alata (Vent.) Briq.
- Davilla angustifolia A.St.-Hil.
- Davilla aspera (Aubl.) Benoist
- Davilla aymardii Fraga
- Davilla bahiana Aymard
- Davilla bilobata Aymard
- Davilla cearensis Huber
- Davilla coriacea Fraga & Stehmann
- Davilla cuatrecasasii Aymard
- Davilla cuspidulata Mart. ex Eichler
- Davilla elliptica A.St.-Hil.
- Davilla flexuosa A.St.-Hil.
- Davilla glabrata Mart. ex Eichler
- Davilla glaziovii Eichler
- Davilla grandiflora A.St.-Hil. & Tul.
- Davilla hirsuticarpa Fraga & Aymard
- Davilla kubitzkii Aymard
- Davilla kunthii A.St.-Hil.
- Davilla lacunosa Mart.
- Davilla lanosa Fraga & Stehmann
- Davilla latifolia Casar.
- Davilla macrocarpa Eichler
- Davilla minutifolia Fraga
- Davilla morii Aymard
- Davilla neei Aymard
- Davilla nitida (Vahl) Kubitzki
- Davilla papyracea Aymard
- Davilla pedicellaris Benth.
- Davilla rugosa Poir.
- Davilla sellowiana Schltdl.
- Davilla sessilifolia Fraga
- Davilla steyermarkii Kubitzki
- Davilla strigosa Kubitzki
- Davilla undulata Fraga & Stehmann

The genus is accepted by United States Department of Agriculture and the Agricultural Research Service, they accept 2 species; Davilla nitida (Vahl) Kubitzki and Davilla rugosa Poir.

== Distribution and habitat ==
Its native range is between Mexico and tropical America. It is found in the countries of; Belize, Bolivia, Brazil, Colombia, Costa Rica, Cuba, Ecuador, French Guiana, Guatemala, Guyana, Honduras, Jamaica, Mexico, Nicaragua, Panama, Paraguay, Peru, Suriname, Trinidad and Tobago and Venezuela.

The greatest Davilla species diversity is located in Brazil, up to 12 species can be found in the Atlantic Forest of Brazil.

=== Habitat ===
It is found in moist or wet forests, often in hilly pine forests. Also in forest clearings and borders.

It grows at altitudes of 350–450 metres (1,150–1,480 ft) above sea level.

== Uses ==
Davilla elliptica and Davilla nitida as well as Alchornea glandulosa (a tree species), have properties that could be used in the treatment of peptic ulcers. The leaves of Davilla elliptica have been used in folk medicine to treat diseases such as inflammation and other ulcers.

== Threats ==
Davilla glaziovii Eichler is included on the red list of Brazil, due to habitat loss and predatory extractivism (the extracting of natural resources).
