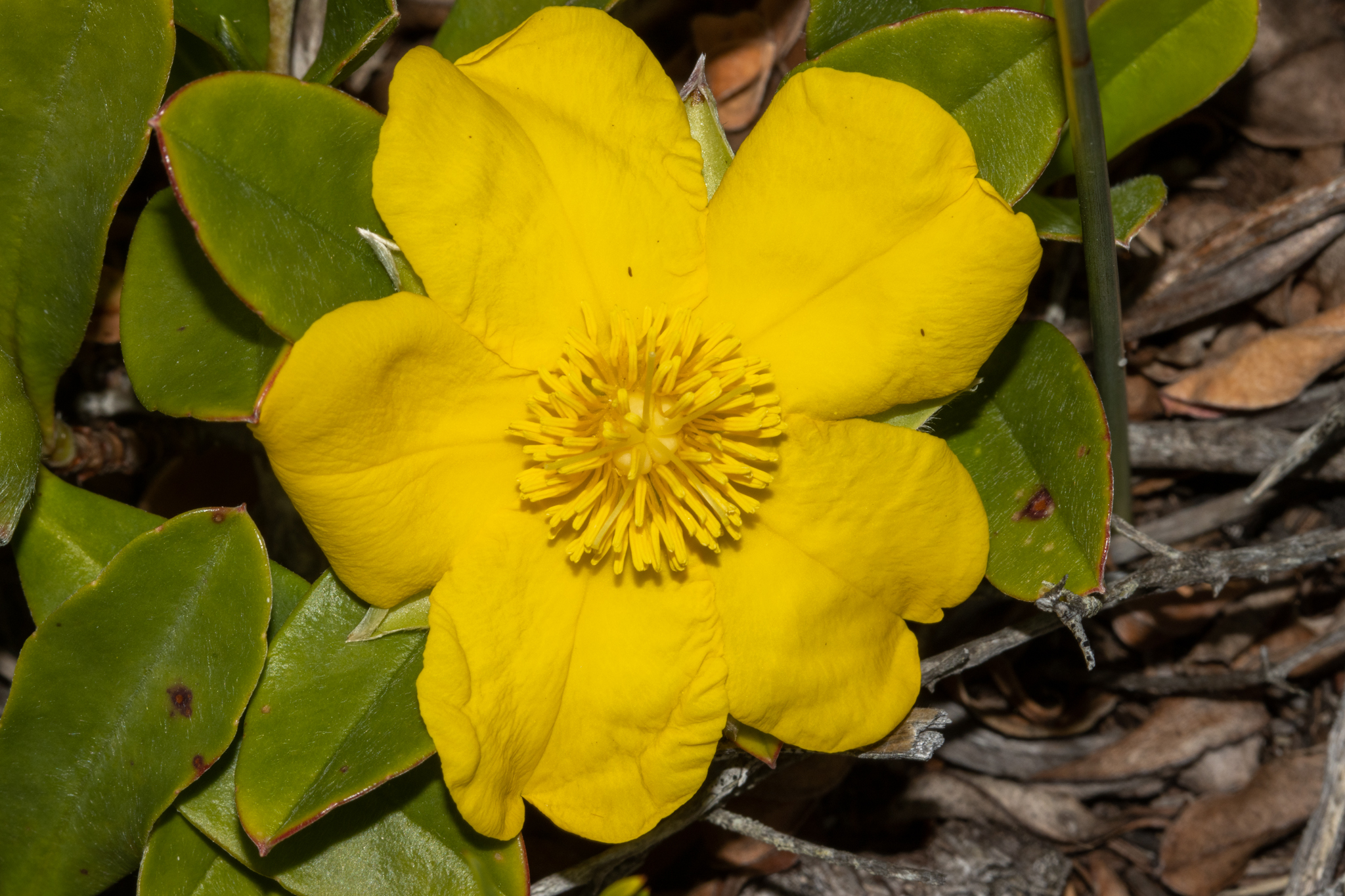
- Hibbertia scandens

Scientific classification
- Kingdom: Plantae
- Clade: Tracheophytes
- Clade: Angiosperms
- Clade: Eudicots
- Order: Dilleniales
- Family: Dilleniaceae
- Genus: Hibbertia; Andrews

Species
- See List of Hibbertia species

Synonyms
- List: Candollea Labill. nom. illeg.; Hibbertia sect. Cyclandra F.Muell. nom. inval.; Hibbertia sect. Euhibbertia Benth. nom. inval.; Eeldea T.Durand; Hibbertia sect. Candollea Gilg; Hemistemma Thouars nom. inval., nom. nud.; Hemistema Thouars orth. var.; Hemistemma Juss. ex Thouars; Pleurandra Labill.; Burtonia Salisb. nom. rej.; Pachynema R.Br. ex DC.; Cistomorpha Caley ex DC. nom. inval., pro syn.; Adrastaea DC.; Adrastea Spreng. orth. var.; Hibbertia sect. Burtonia (Salisb.) G.Don; Ochrolasia Turcz.; Huttia J.Drumm. ex Harv.; Hemistephus J.Drumm. ex Harv.; Warburtonia F.Muell.; Pachynema sect. Huttia (J.Drumm. ex Harv.) Benth. & Hook.f.; Pachynema R.Br. ex DC. sect. Pachynema; Hibbertia sect. Hemistemma (Thouars) Benth.; Hibbertia sect. Pleurandra (Labill.) Benth.; Hibbertia sect. Huttia (J.Drumm. ex Harv.) F.Muell.; Pleurandros St.-Lag. orth. var.; Pachynema sect. Stemmatanthus F.Muell. & Tate; Pachynema sect. Stematanthus Gilg & Werderm. orth. var.; Hibbertia sect. Hemistema A.D.Chapm. orth. var.

= Hibbertia =

Genus of flowering plants

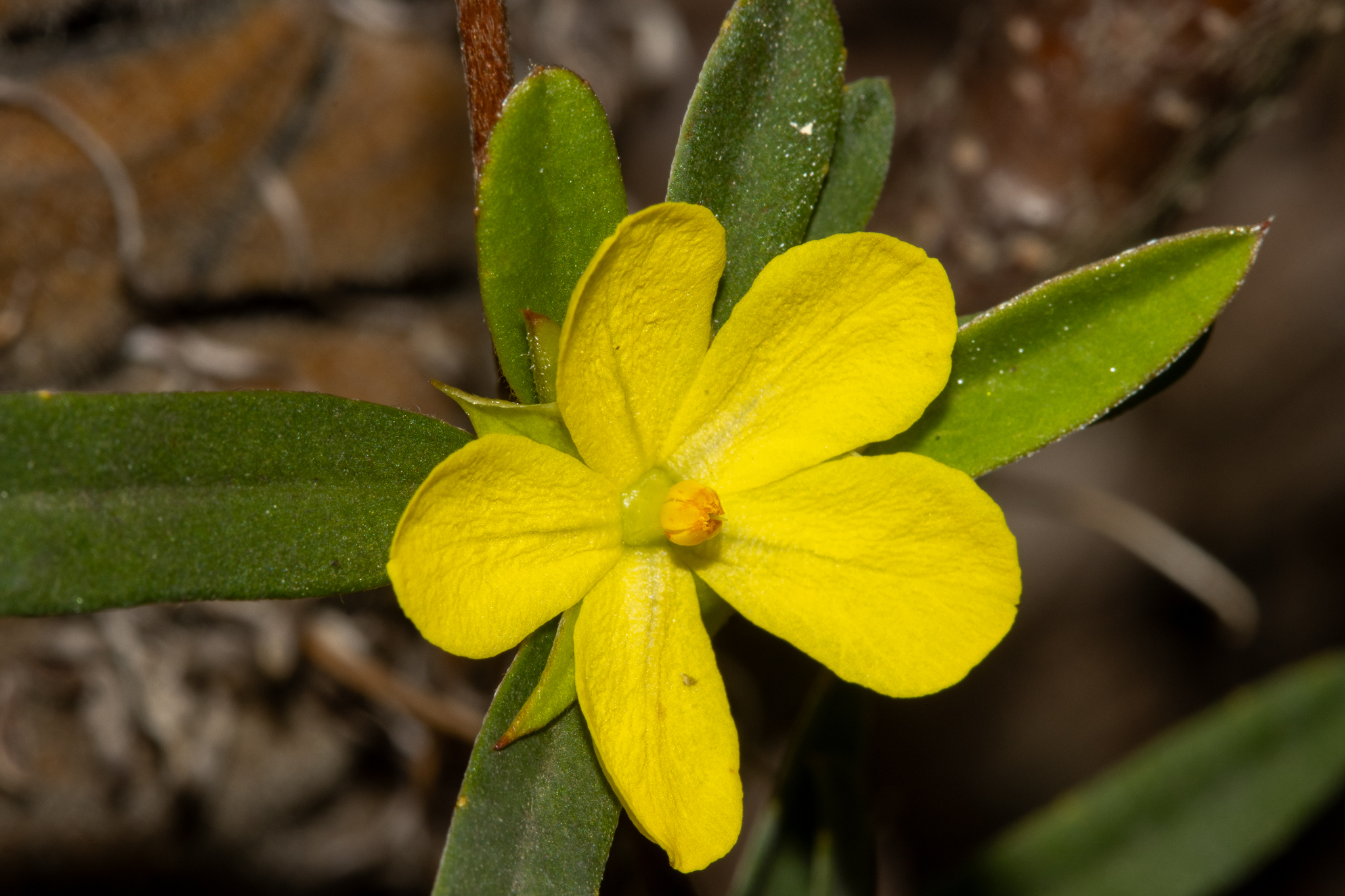
Hibbertia salicifolia in Hibbertia subgen. Adrastaea

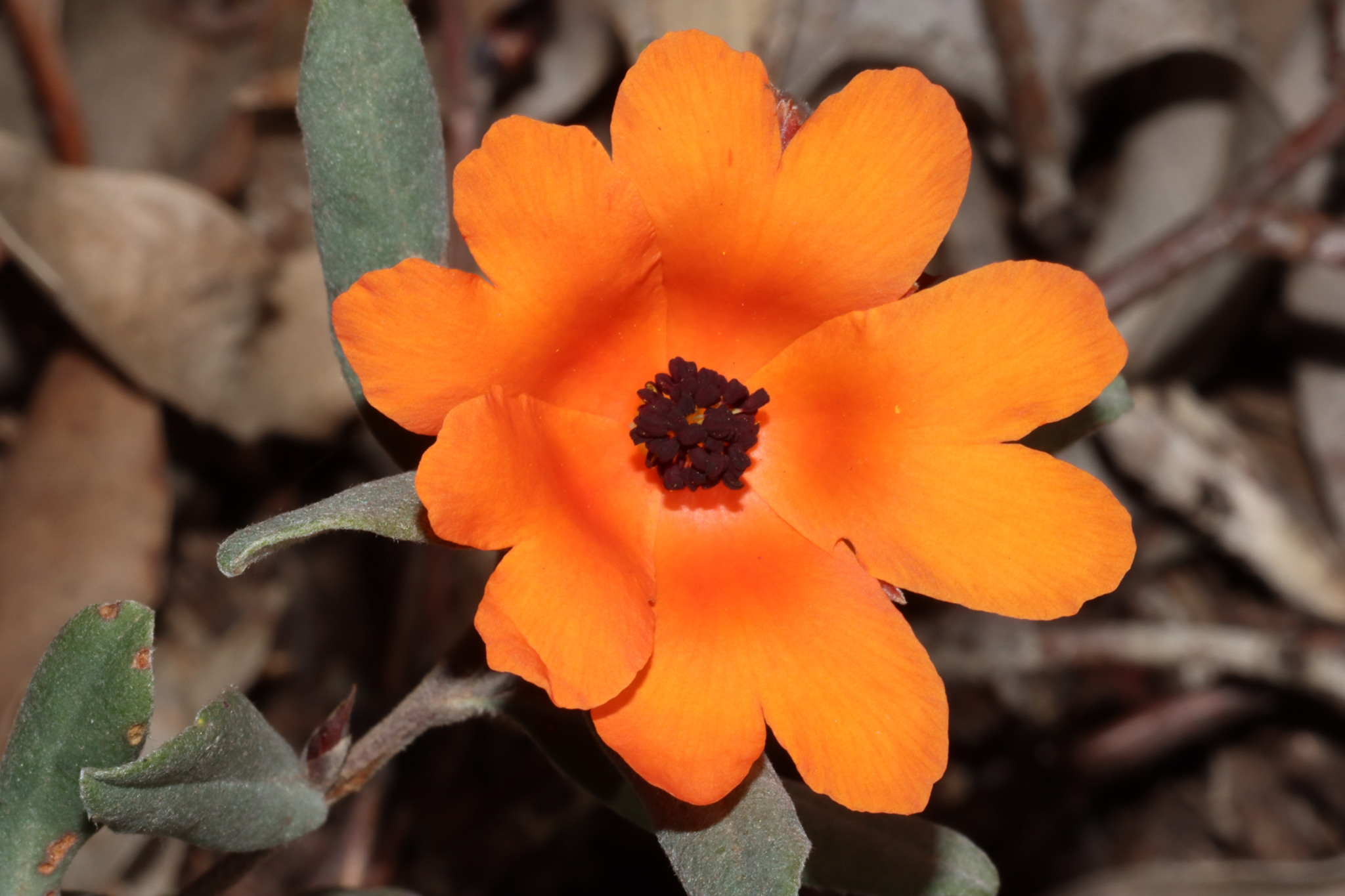
Hibbertia miniata in Hibbertia subgen. Hibbertia

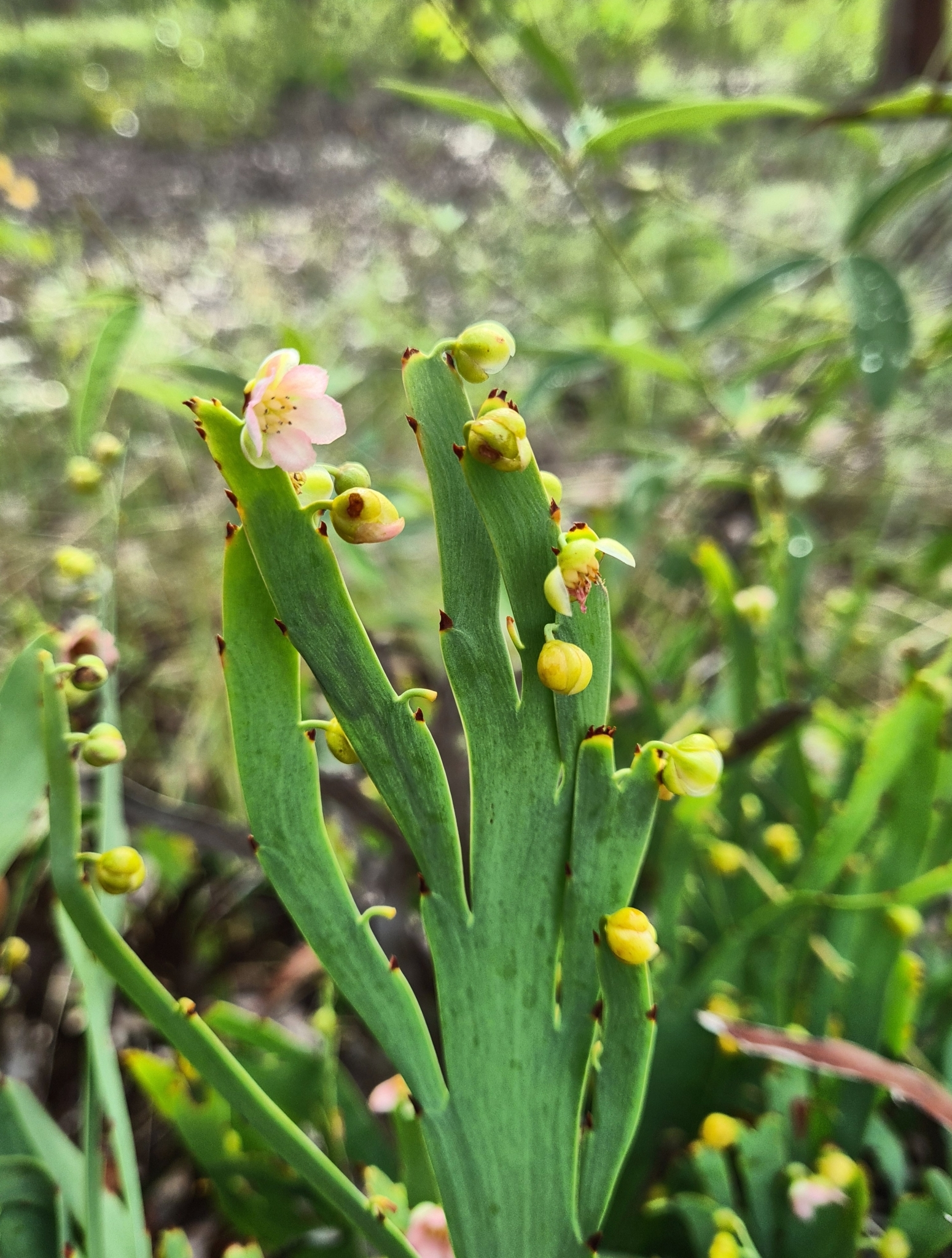
Hibbertia dilatata in Hibbertia subgen. Pachynema

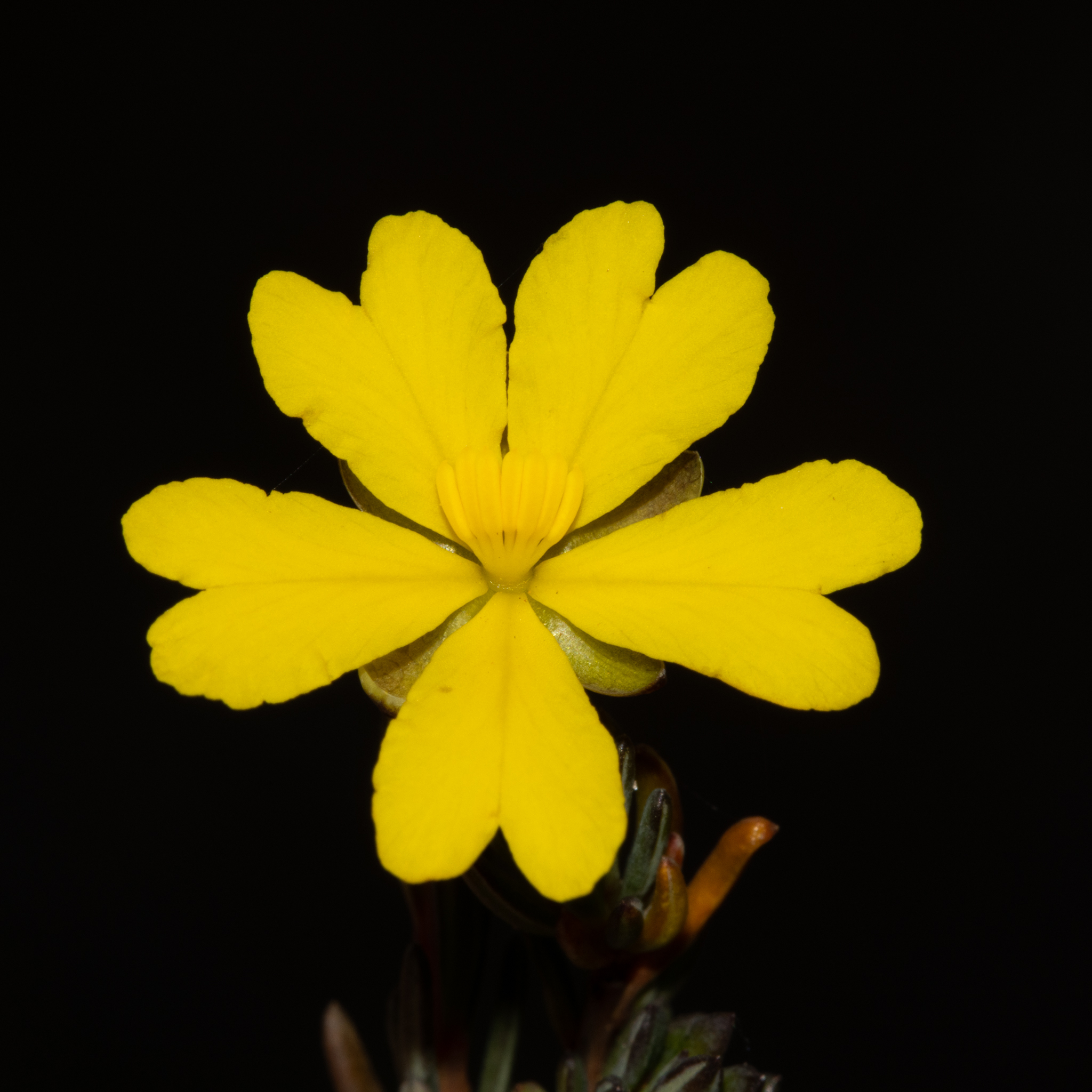
Hibbertia gracilipes in Hibbertia subgen. Hemistemma

Hibbertia, commonly known as guinea flowers, is a genus of flowering plants in the family Dilleniaceae. They are usually shrubs with simple leaves and flowers with five sepals and five petals that are usually yellow, but also sometimes orange, red, pink and white. There are about 400 species, most of which occur in Australia but a few species occur in New Guinea, New Caledonia, Fiji and Madagascar.

== Description ==
Plants in the genus Hibbertia are usually shrubs, rarely climbers, and often form mats. Their leaves are usually arranged alternately along the stems, usually sessile, clustered on short side-branches, and have smooth, rarely toothed or lobed edges. The flowers are usually arranged singly in leaf axils or on the ends of stems and have five sepals, two "outer" sepals slightly overlapping the three "inner" ones. There are five yellow, rarely orange, petals and the stamens are usually arranged in three to five groups, sometimes on only one side of the carpels. There are between two and five carpels, usually free from each other, each containing up to six ovules and with a style on the top. The fruit is a follicle containing seeds, usually with an aril.

== Taxonomy and naming ==
The genus Hibbertia was first formally described in 1800 by Henry Cranke Andrews in his book The Botanist's Repository for New, and Rare Plants and the first species he described was H. volubilis, now known as H. scandens. The name Hibbertia honours George Hibbert, a patron of botany and slave trader. The common name, guinea flower, reflects the resemblance of the flowers to the colour and shape of the guinea coin.

=== Species list ===
See List of Hibbertia species
