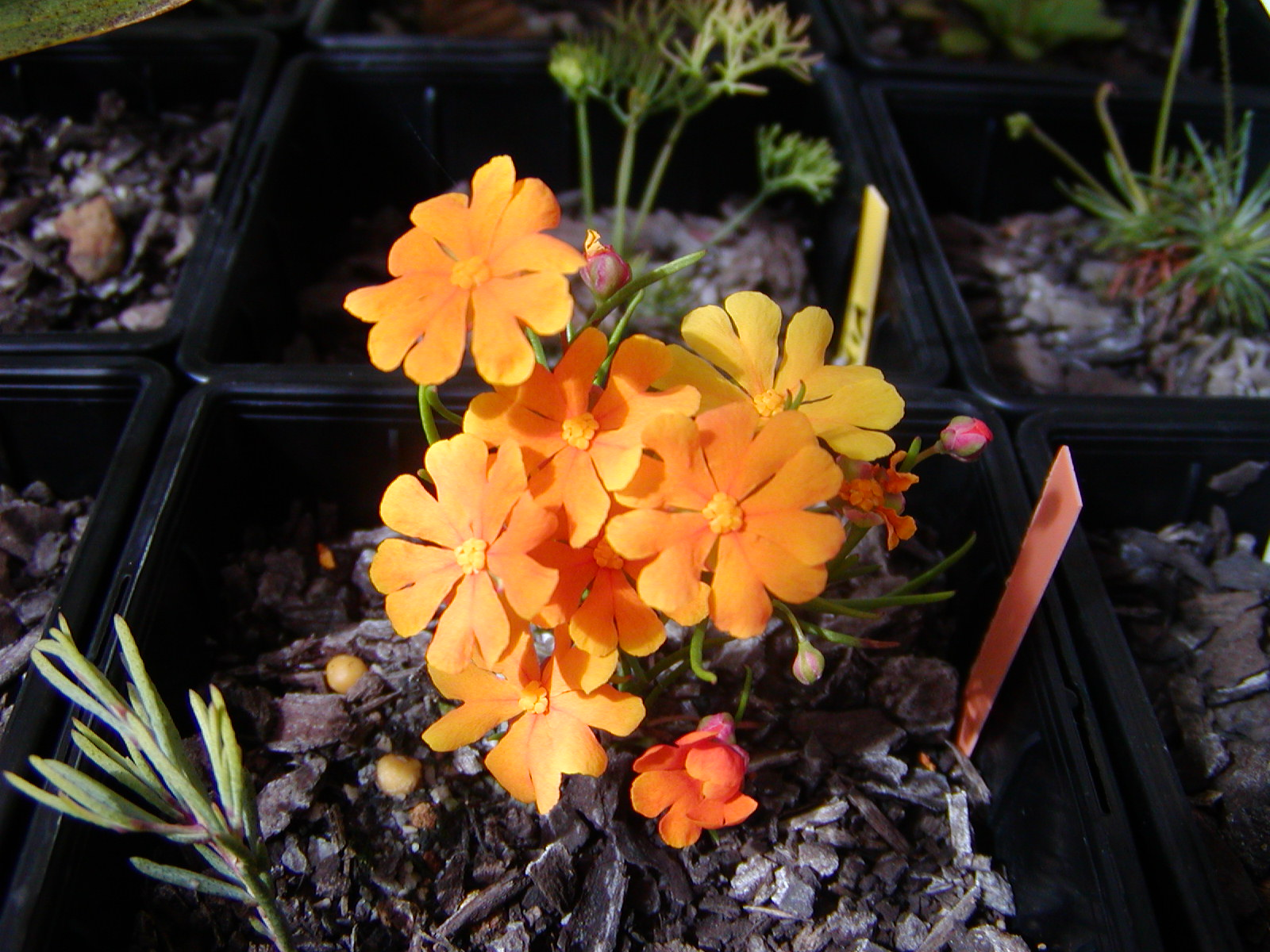
- Hibbertia stellaris

Scientific classification
- Kingdom: Plantae
- Clade: Tracheophytes
- Clade: Angiosperms
- Clade: Eudicots
- Order: Dilleniales
- Family: Dilleniaceae; Salisb.

Genera
- APG II system recognizes the following genera: Acrotrema; Curatella; Davilla; Didesmandra; Dillenia; Doliocarpus; Hibbertia; Neodillenia; Pinzona; Schumacheria; Tetracera

= Dilleniaceae =

Dilleniaceae Temporal range: Early Paleogene – Recent (but see text) 52–0 Ma

Family of flowering plants

Dilleniaceae is a family of flowering plants with 11 genera and about 430 known species. It is known to gardeners for the genus Hibbertia, which contains many commercially valuable garden species.

== Description and distribution ==
The family is found in the tropics and subtropics plus all of Australia. Most of the members in it are woody plants - lianas or trees such as Dillenia - but herbaceous species such as Hibbertia are also present in Dilleniaceae. The leaves of the plants in the family are wide and well-developed, but in certain species of Hibbertia they are strongly modified. The flowers are mainly showy and colorful with visible reproductive components. Buzz pollination is common in the group. Fruits of some species, such as Dillenia indica (elephant apple), are edible.

== Taxonomy and phylogeny ==
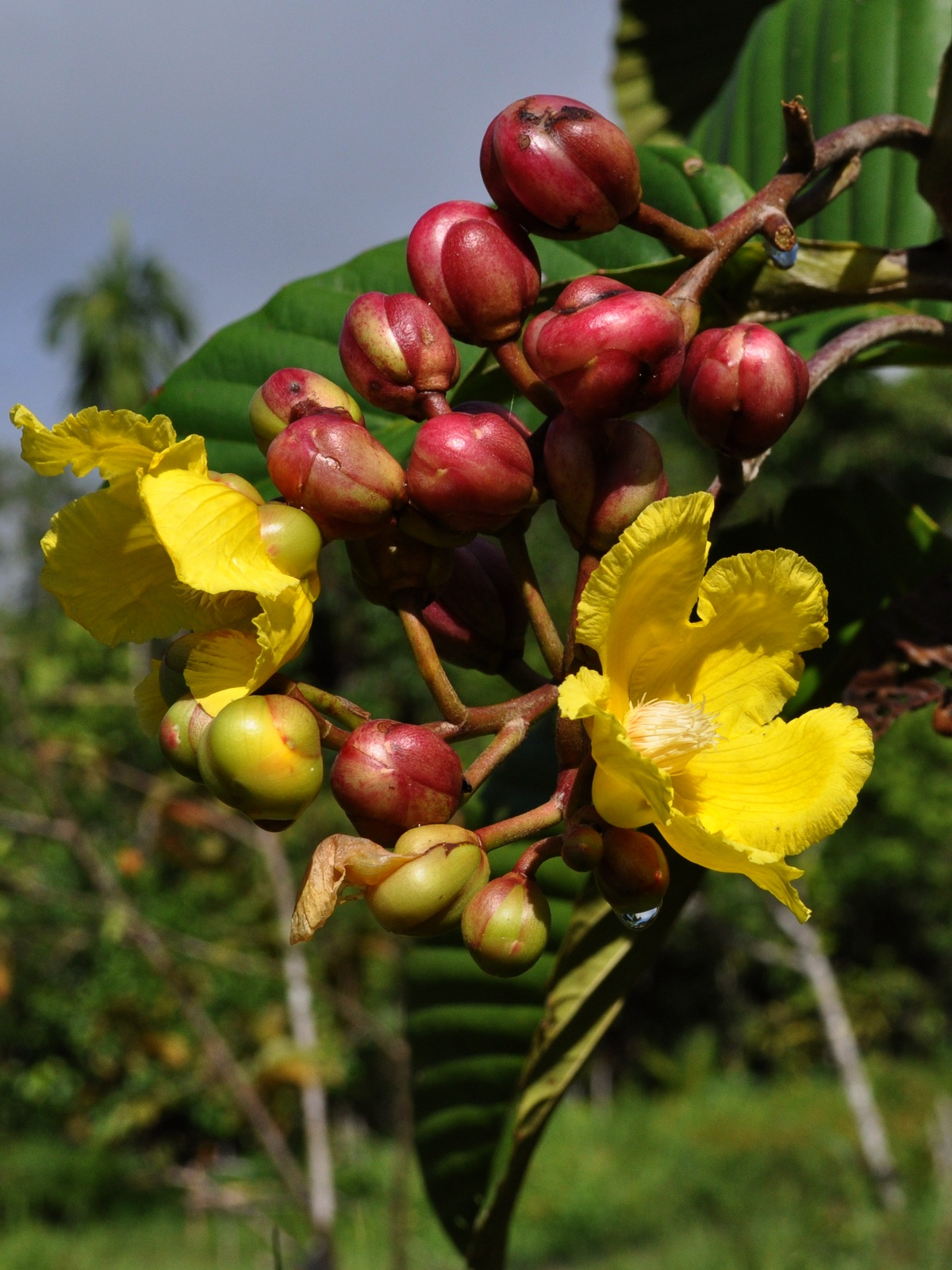
Dillenia suffruticosa

The position of the family in the phylogenetic tree and its classification among the other eudicots is uncertain. Some studies suggested that Dilleniaceae may be sister to Rhabdodendraceae a clade that was thought to be sister to all the rest Caryophyllales. The caryophyllid Rhabdodendron and the members in the family with the questionable placement in fact share some morphological characteristics, but it has been found that Rhabdodendraceae is actually sister only to the core members of its order.

Another possible situation places Dilleniaceae as an ancient group, sister to the superrosidae clade (the family shares some common morphology with Vitales) but this is not absolutely proven.

The APG II system, of 2003 (unchanged from the APG system of 1998), also recognizes this family, unplaced as to order, assigned to the clade core eudicots.

APG II debates either including it in order Caryophyllales or reinstating the order Dilleniales for just this one family, but decides to leave it unplaced.

== Evolution ==
The family is remarkable because of its variability of morphological characteristics that now are much steadier in other Angiosperm groups. Thus, Dilleniaceae may be an ancient clade that expresses some phylogenetic relation between the higher Eudicots and the rather more primitive groups.

It is estimated that the clade diverged around 115 million years ago in the Mid Cretaceous, but the crown group was formed much later - only 52 million years before the present.
