= List of moths of Australia (Zygaenidae) =

Partial list of Australian moths

The family Zygaenidae comprises the "forester and burnet moths", only species of the tribe Artonini (subfamily Procridinae) are found in Australia. This list acts as an index to the species articles and forms part of the full List of moths of Australia.

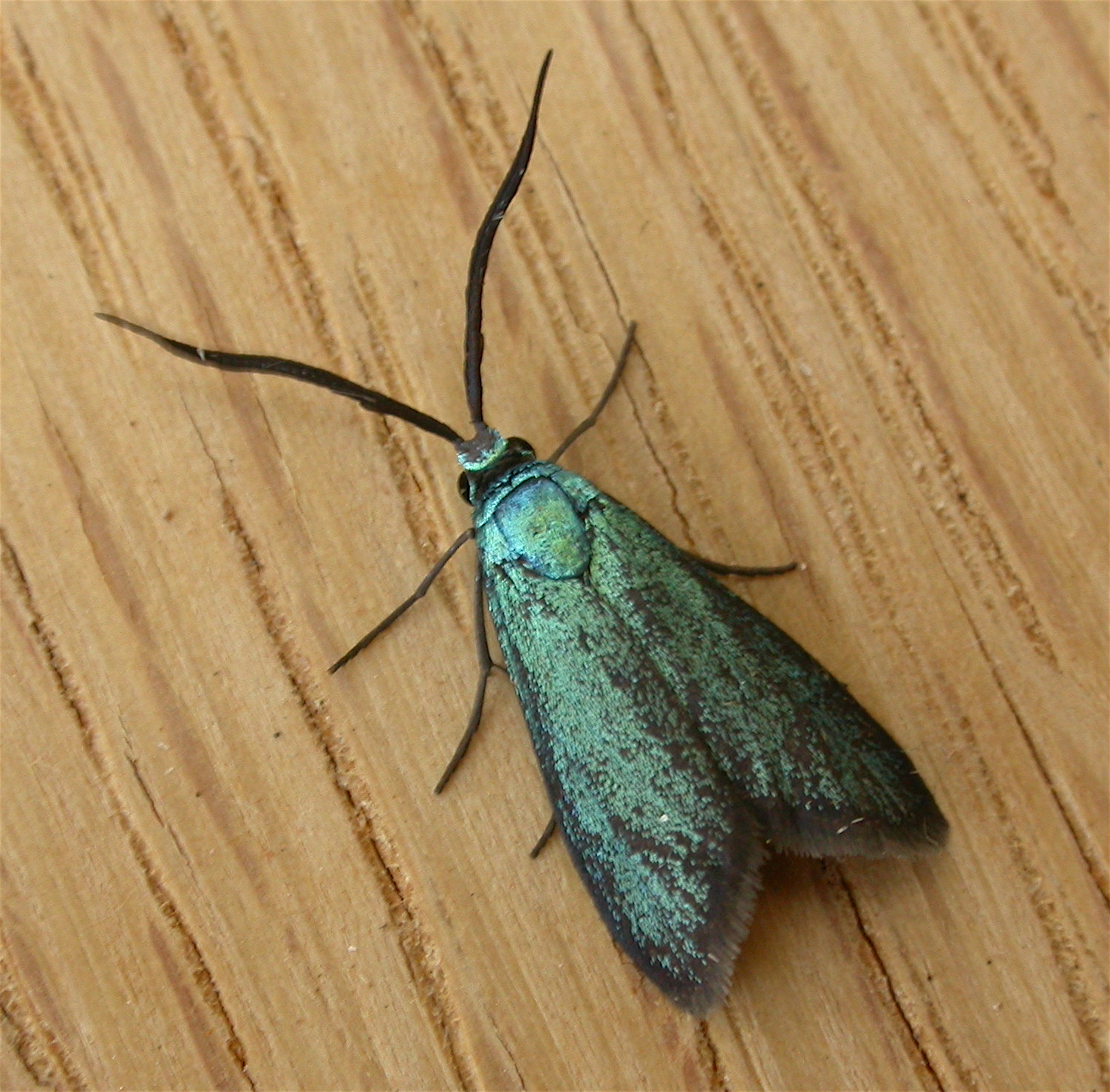
Pollanisus apicalis

- Australartona mirabilis Tarmann, 2005
- Hestiochora continentalis Tarmann, 2005
- Hestiochora erythrota Meyrick, 1886
- Hestiochora furcata Tarmann, 2005
- Hestiochora intermixta Tarmann, 2005
- Hestiochora occidentalis Tarmann, 2005
- Hestiochora queenslandensis Tarmann, 2005
- Hestiochora tricolor (Walker, 1854)
- Hestiochora xanthocoma Meyrick, 1886
- Homophylotis artonoides Tarmann, 2005
- Homophylotis pseudothyridota Tarmann, 2005
- Homophylotis thyridota Turner, 1904
- Myrtartona coronias (Meyrick, 1886)
- Myrtartona leucopleura (Meyrick, 1886)
- Myrtartona mariannae Tarmann, 2005
- Myrtartona rufiventris (Walker, 1854)
- Onceropyga anelia Turner, 1906
- Onceropyga pulchra Tarmann, 2005
- Palmartona catoxantha (Hampson, 1893)
- Pollanisus acharon (Fabricius, 1775)
- Pollanisus angustifrons Tarmann, 2005
- Pollanisus apicalis (Walker, 1854)
- Pollanisus calliceros Turner, 1926
- Pollanisus commoni Tarmann, 2005
- Pollanisus contrastus Tarmann, 2005
- Pollanisus cupreus Walker, 1854
- Pollanisus cyanota (Meyrick, 1886)
- Pollanisus edwardsi Tarmann, 2005
- Pollanisus empyrea (Meyrick, 1888)
- Pollanisus eumetopus Turner, 1926
- Pollanisus eungellae Tarmann, 2005
- Pollanisus incertus Tarmann, 2005
- Pollanisus isolatus Tarmann, 2005
- Pollanisus lithopastus Turner, 1926
- Pollanisus modestus Tarmann, 2005
- Pollanisus nielseni Tarmann, 2005
- Pollanisus subdolosa (Walker, 1865)
- Pollanisus trimacula (Walker, 1854)
- Pollanisus viridipulverulenta (Guérin-Méneville, 1839)
- Pseudoamuria neglecta Tarmann, 2005
- Pseudoamuria uptoni Tarmann, 2005
- Thyrassia inconcinna Swinhoe, 1892
- Turneriprocris dolens (Walker, 1854)
