= Pollanisus nielseni =

Scientific classification
- Kingdom: Animalia
- Phylum: Arthropoda
- Clade: Pancrustacea
- Class: Insecta
- Order: Lepidoptera
- Family: Zygaenidae
- Genus: Pollanisus
- Species: P. nielseni

Binomial name
- Pollanisus nielseni Tarmann, 2005

Species of moth

Pollanisus nielseni is a moth of the family Zygaenidae. It inhabits the Australian state of Western Australia, mostly coastal areas, and has brilliantly shiny forewings. The diurnal adults are most active on sunny days. Eggs are laid on the plant Hibbertia spicata, and females touch each egg after oviposition with a tuft of hair on their abdomen, which attaches protective spines. The larvae are brightly coloured and feed on H. spicata before pupation.

== Taxonomy ==
The holotype was collected 5 km east of Wedge Island in Western Australia by Gerhard M. Tarmann in 1995, and the species was formally described by him in 2005, in the work Zygaenid Moths of Australia: A Revision of the Australian Zygaenidae, (Procridinae: Artonini). Previously, P. nielseni had been considered a variant of the slightly larger moth Pollanisus cupreus. The two species share habitat and possess similarities, but, among other visual differences, P. nielseni is smaller and has significantly more sheen to its forewings than P. cupreus.

The etymology of the specific epithet nielseni, given by Tarmann, is a tribute to his colleague Ebbe Nielsen, a leading Danish entomologist who had died four years before Tarmann described the species.

== Morphology ==
For adult males, the length of the forewings is 9–10 millimetres (0.35–0.39 in) and in females it is 8–8.5 mm (0.31–0.33 in). The scales on the forewings of both sexes are brightly metallic, usually golden and green, giving the moth a brilliant sheen. The hindwings are opaque and dark coloured. The moth's head, antennae, legs, and abdomen are usually bluish green and a shiny metallic. The hair-tuft on the female's abdomen is yellow, which is used to attach protective scales to her pale yellow eggs following deposition. The emergent larvae are brightly coloured.

As with most primitive Lepidoptera, the frequency of the wing beat is constant while the moth is in flight. When at rest, the wings are laid back on the abdomen and thorax. In this position, the wings are hooked to the metathorax with very fine, hook-like hairs, present on both the undersides of the wings and the metathorax, which interlock in a "Velcro" way. This wing-locking mechanism is referred to as "Haftfeld" (sometimes not capitalised) and is characteristic of the family.

== Life cycle and behaviour ==
Observations suggest P. nielseni is a bivoltine species, with two generations per year, one in early spring and another in mid-summer. Females lay pale yellow eggs on the small flowering shrub Hibbertia spicata, ovipositing singly on the leaves, sepals, or stems. The brightly coloured larvae feed on the plant and afterwards pupate in silken cocoons on leaves or stems, or in leaf litter on the ground. The cocoons contain minute crystals of whewellite, produced by the larva's Malphigian tubule system. The adult moths are diurnal and most active on sunny days. They have been witnessed feeding on the flowers of Arctotheca calendula and Phyllanthus calycinus.

In the subfamilies Procridinae and Zygaeninae of the family Zygaenidae, female moths typically have two glands near the ovipositor that produce liquid poison. Referred to on occasion as "Petersen's glands", their function is to defend the eggs from prospective parasitoids. Three genera of these two subfamilies, however, including Pollanisus, have developed an alternative defence against predators. A tuft of hair at the end of the female's abdomen is brushed over each egg after it is laid, thereby attaching small spiny scales to its surface. The tips of these scales are presumably poisonous, as aphids have been observed dying following touching them.
