= H. tricolor =

H. tricolor may refer to:

- Hemileuca tricolor, the tricolor buckmoth, a moth species native mainly to the Sonoran Desert of the southwestern United States
- Hestiochora tricolor, a moth species found in the southern half of Australia
- Heterixalus tricolor, a frog species endemic to Madagascar
- Holacanthus tricolor, the rock beauty, a marine angelfish species
- Hypselodoris tricolor, a colourful sea slug species

== See also ==
- Tricolor (disambiguation)
