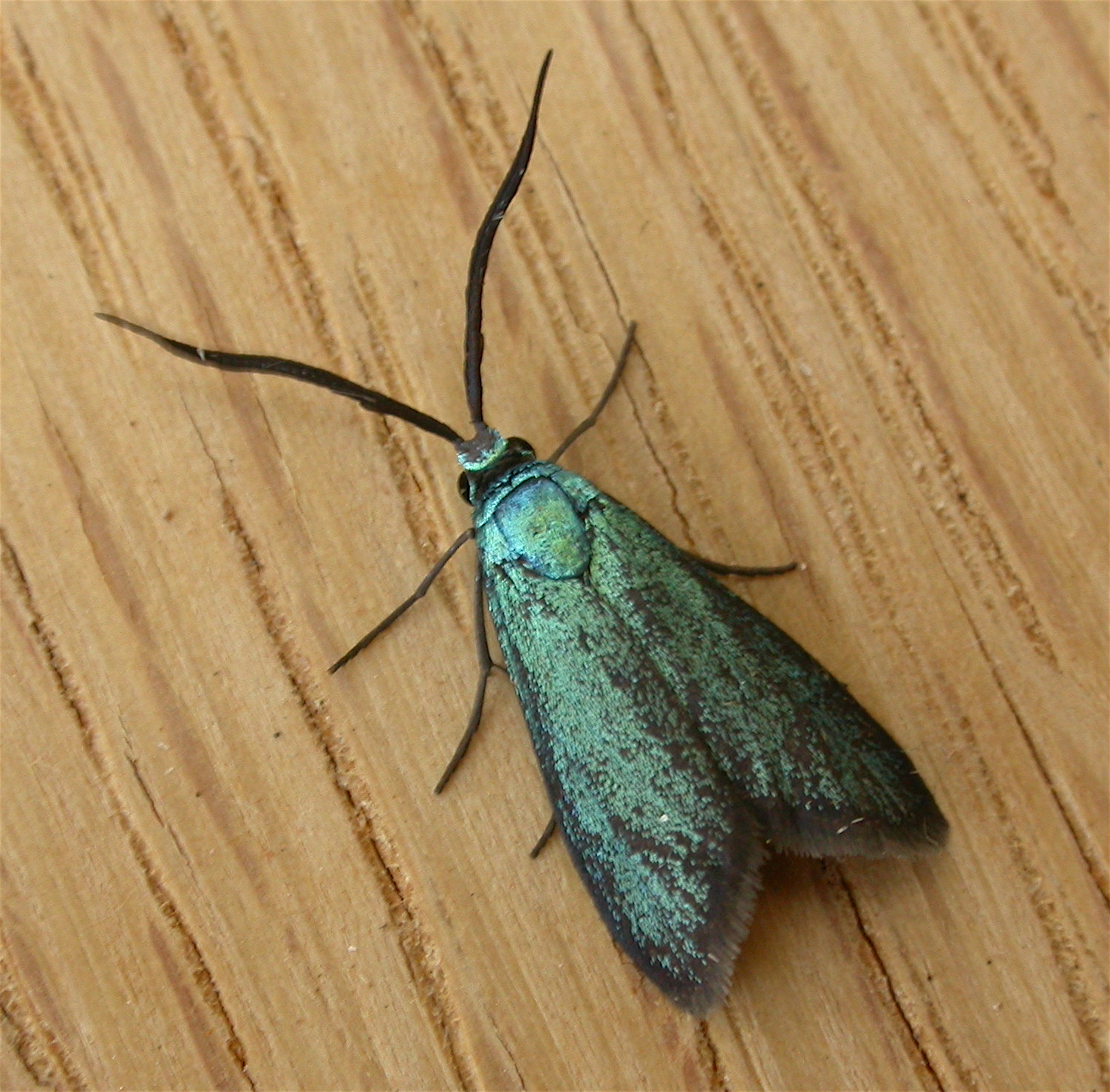

Scientific classification
- Kingdom: Animalia
- Phylum: Arthropoda
- Class: Insecta
- Order: Lepidoptera
- Family: Zygaenidae
- Genus: Pollanisus
- Species: P. apicalis

Binomial name
- Pollanisus apicalis Walker, 1854

Synonyms
- Pollanisus sequens; Procris novaehollandiae

= Pollanisus apicalis =

Species of moth

Pollanisus apicalis is a moth of the family Zygaenidae. It is found in the eastern part of Australia (Queensland, New South Wales, Australian Capital Territory, Victoria, South Australia and Tasmania).

The larvae feed on Hibbertia obtusifolia and Hibbertia virgata. Adult moths are day flying, and can be found feeding during the hottest hours of the day. Mating takes place in the afternoon and lasts until the following morning, and following this the female lays eggs on the host plant.
