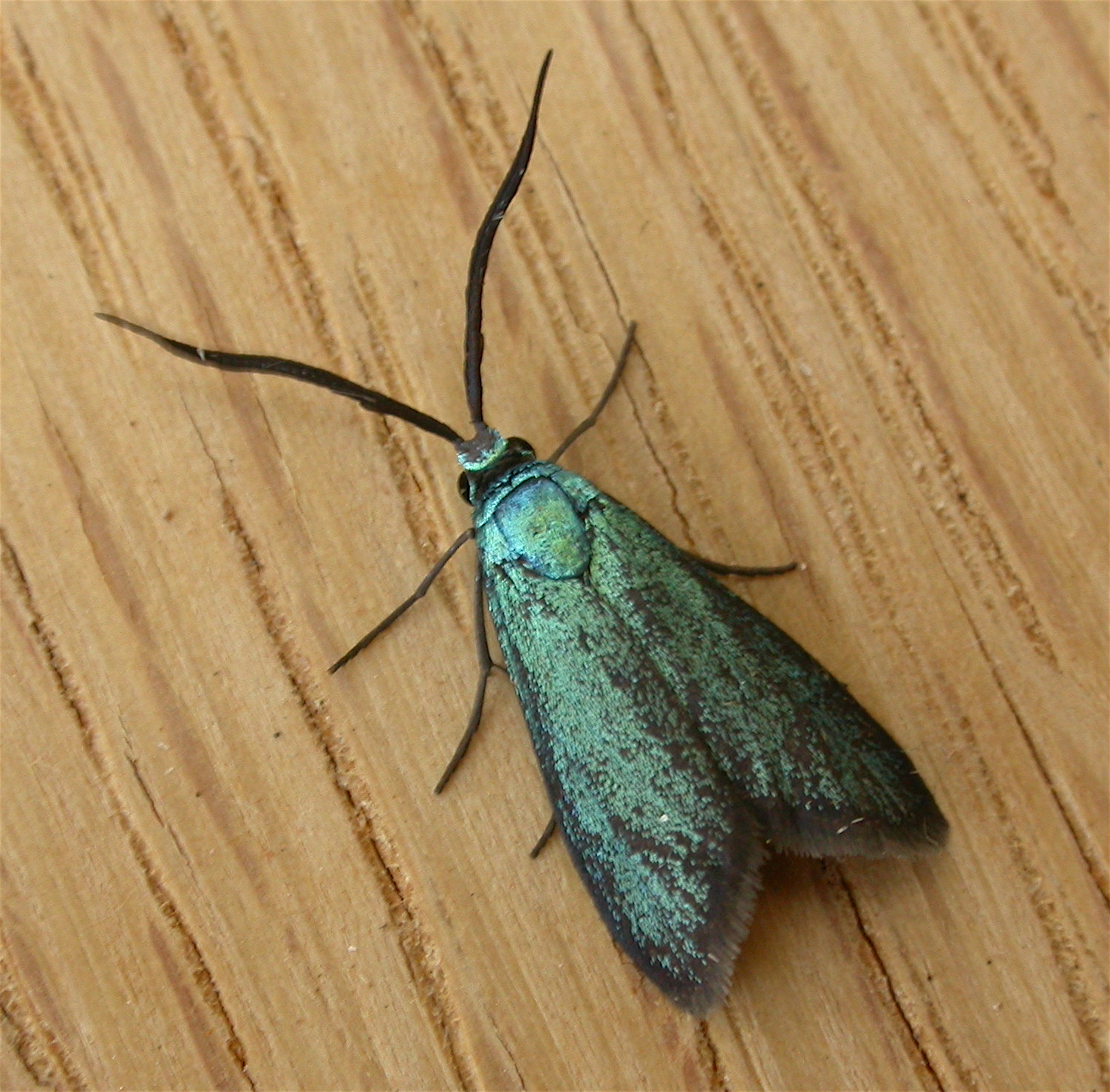
- Pollanisus apicalis

Scientific classification
- Kingdom: Animalia
- Phylum: Arthropoda
- Class: Insecta
- Order: Lepidoptera
- Family: Zygaenidae
- Subfamily: Procridinae
- Genus: Pollanisus; Walker, 1854

= Pollanisus =

Genus of moths

Pollanisus is a genus of moths of the family Zygaenidae. They are native to Australia and many species have metallic forewings and bodies.

== Species ==
- Pollanisus acharon (Fabricius, 1775)
- Pollanisus angustifrons Tarmann, 2005
- Pollanisus apicalis (Walker, 1854)
- Pollanisus calliceros Turner, 1926
- Pollanisus commoni Tarmann, 2005
- Pollanisus contrastus Tarmann, 2005
- Pollanisus cupreus Walker, 1854
- Pollanisus cyanota (Meyrick, 1886)
- Pollanisus edwardsi Tarmann, 2005
- Pollanisus empyrea (Meyrick, 1888)
- Pollanisus eumetopus Turner, 1926
- Pollanisus eungellae Tarmann, 2005
- Pollanisus incertus Tarmann, 2005
- Pollanisus isolatus Tarmann, 2005
- Pollanisus lithopastus Turner, 1926
- Pollanisus marriotti Kallies & Mollet, 2011
- Pollanisus modestus Tarmann, 2005
- Pollanisus nielseni Tarmann, 2005
- Pollanisus subdolosa (Walker, 1865)
- Pollanisus trimacula (Walker, 1854)
- Pollanisus viridipulverulenta (Guérin-Méneville, 1839)
