= Homophylotis =

Scientific classification
- Domain: Eukaryota
- Kingdom: Animalia
- Phylum: Arthropoda
- Class: Insecta
- Order: Lepidoptera
- Family: Zygaenidae
- Subfamily: Procridinae
- Genus: Homophylotis; Turner, 1904

Genus of moths

Homophylotis is a genus of moths of the family Zygaenidae.

== Species ==
- Homophylotis thyridota Turner, 1904
- Homophylotis pseudothyridota Tarmann, 2005
- Homophylotis artonoides Tarmann, 2005
- Homophylotis doloides (Pagenstecher, 1900) (Bismarck Archipelago)
