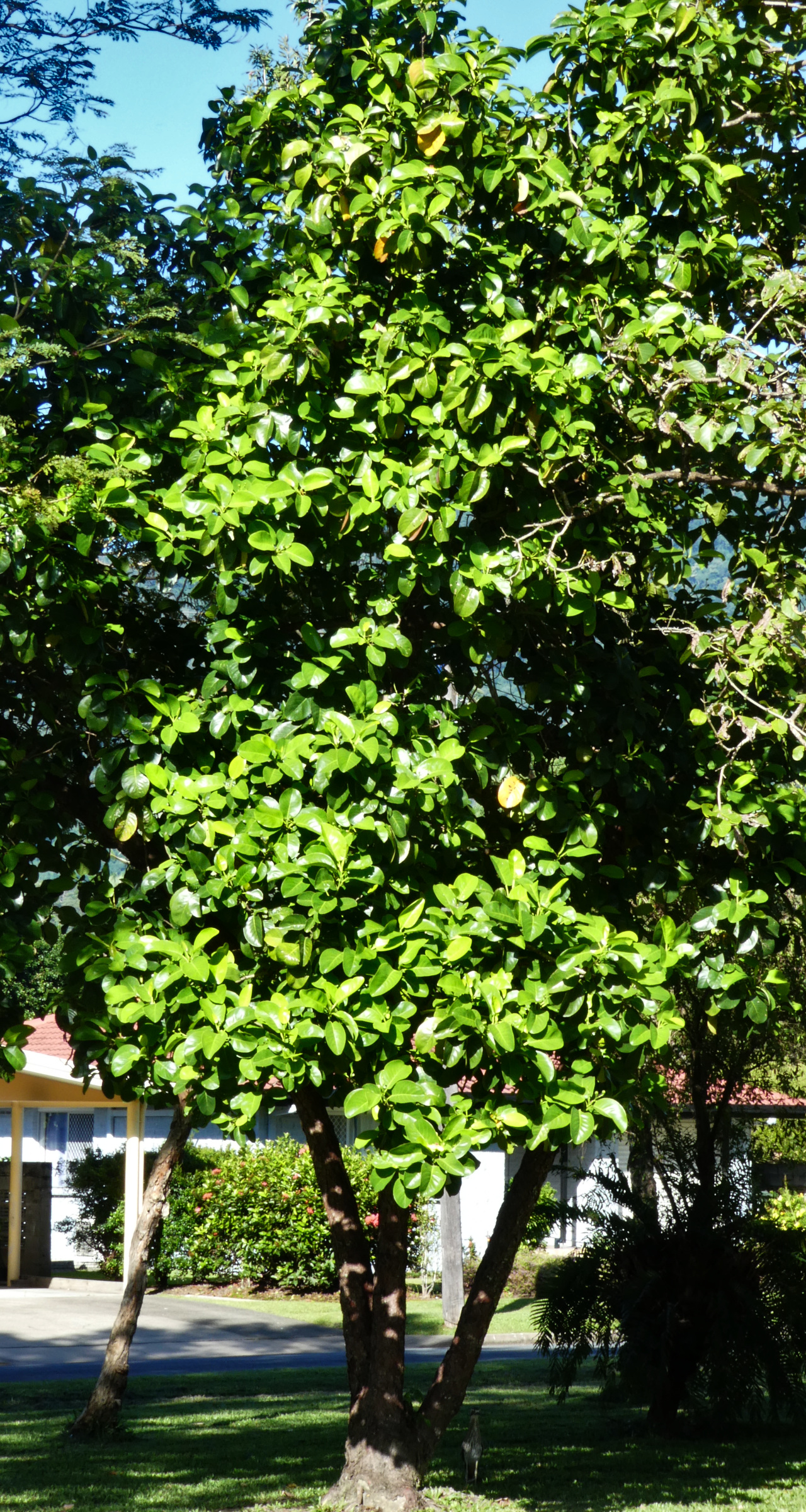

Conservation status
- Least Concern (IUCN 3.1)

Scientific classification
- Kingdom: Plantae
- Clade: Embryophytes
- Clade: Tracheophytes
- Clade: Spermatophytes
- Clade: Angiosperms
- Clade: Eudicots
- Order: Dilleniales
- Family: Dilleniaceae
- Genus: Dillenia
- Species: D. alata

Binomial name
- Dillenia alata (R.Br. ex DC.) Martelli
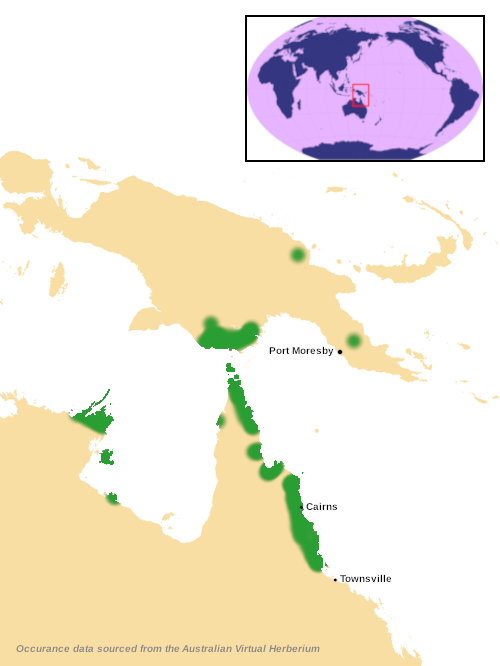

Synonyms
- Dillenia apetala Martelli; Lenidia alata Poir.; Wormia alata R.Br. ex DC.; Wormia apetala Gaudich.

= Dillenia alata =

Red beech

Species of flowering plant

Dillenia alata, commonly known as red beech, golden guinea flower or golden guinea tree, is a tree in the Dilleniaceae family, found in New Guinea, and the Northern Territory and Queensland in Australia. It has found some popularity as an ornamental for tropical parks and large gardens due to its colourful flowers and fruit.

== Description ==
Dillenia alata is a medium-sized tree, growing to 20 m (66 ft) tall with a trunk up to 60 cm (24 in) diameter and a dense shady crown. It has a distinctive reddish brown, papery bark that peels easily. The leaves are simple and entire, that is, they have no marginal teeth, lobes or any other divisions of the leaf blade. They are glossy dark green and rather large, measuring up to 25 cm (9.8 in) long and 12 cm (4.7 in) wide, and there are between 8 and 14 lateral veins either side of the midrib. They are arranged spirally on the twigs, on petioles (leaf stalks) about 4 cm (1.6 in) long. The petioles are broadly and conspicuously winged, and they sheath the twig.

The inflorescence is a raceme carrying up to 4 flowers, borne on the twigs more or less opposite a leaf, with each flower being held on a pedicel about 4 cm (1.6 in) long. The green calyx has five lobes in two whorls—the inner whorl has three lobes about 20 mm (0.8 in) long, and the outer with two lobes up to 13 mm (0.5 in) long. There are five (sometimes six) yellow, rounded petals about 4 cm (1.6 in) long and 2.5 cm (1 in) wide. Two circles of stamens are at the centre, the outer yellow ones are shorter and number about 100, the inner ones are taller, pink-red and number about 20. There are 6–8 carpels arranged around the receptacle with pink-red styles up to 12 mm (0.5 in) long; each carpel has 8–10 ovaries.

The distinctive fruit is a dehiscent red capsule with a persistent calyx. It opens widely at maturity, splitting into 8 valves (or segments) and revealing a number of 4 mm (0.16 in) long black seeds which are fully enclosed in a waxy white aril.

=== Phenology ===
Flowering of this species has been observed throughout the year, but with a peak from June to September and a low around March.

== Taxonomy ==
The species was originally named Wormia alata by the Scottish botanist Robert Brown, and later formally described in 1817 by the Swiss botanist Augustin Pyramus de Candolle. His description was based on plant material collected by Joseph Banks at Point Lookout, Endeavour River, during James Cook's first voyage of discovery in 1770.

The species was transferred to the genus Dillenia by Italian botanist Ugolino Martelli in 1886.

=== Etymology ===
The genus name Dillenia was given in honour of the German-born botanist Johann Jacob Dillenius. The specific epithet, alata, is derived from the Latin word āla, winged, and is a reference to the winged petioles.

== Distribution and habitat ==
The species is native to the islands of Waigeo, New Guinea, and the Torres Strait, as well as the Northern Territory and Queensland in Australia. In New Guinea the majority of observations occur in the southernmost region of the island, adjacent to the Torres Strait. In the Northern Territory the species mostly occurs in the northeast of Arnhem Land, while in Queensland it occurs from the Torres Strait islands south along the east coast of Cape York Peninsula to about Cardwell.

It grows in rainforest, monsoon forest, and open woodland, but is most common in lowland forests in very wet areas such as coastal swamps and near watercourses. The altitudinal range is from sea level up to about 600 m (2,000 ft).

== Ecology ==
The flowers are probably pollinated by carpenter bees (genus Xylocopa), and the fruit are eaten by a number of birds including the eclectus parrot (Eclectus polychloros). The tree is also host to larvae of the Queensland moth Pollanisus commoni.

== Conservation ==
As of September 2024, this species is considered to be of least concern by the IUCN, the Northern Territory Government and the Queensland Government. The IUCN statement says that the tree has "a very wide distribution, large population, [and] is not currently experiencing any major threats". It also states that no future threats are anticipated at this time.

== Cultivation ==
This species has "considerable horticultural merit", and the Australian botanist David L. Jones, in his book Rainforest Plants of Australia, said "A striking ornamental, common along stream banks and in swampy soils. The leaves, bark, flowers and fruit are all highly decorative features". In the city of Cairns, Queensland, more than 200 of these trees have been planted across the city by the Cairns Regional Council, mostly in parks and larger gardens.

== Gallery ==
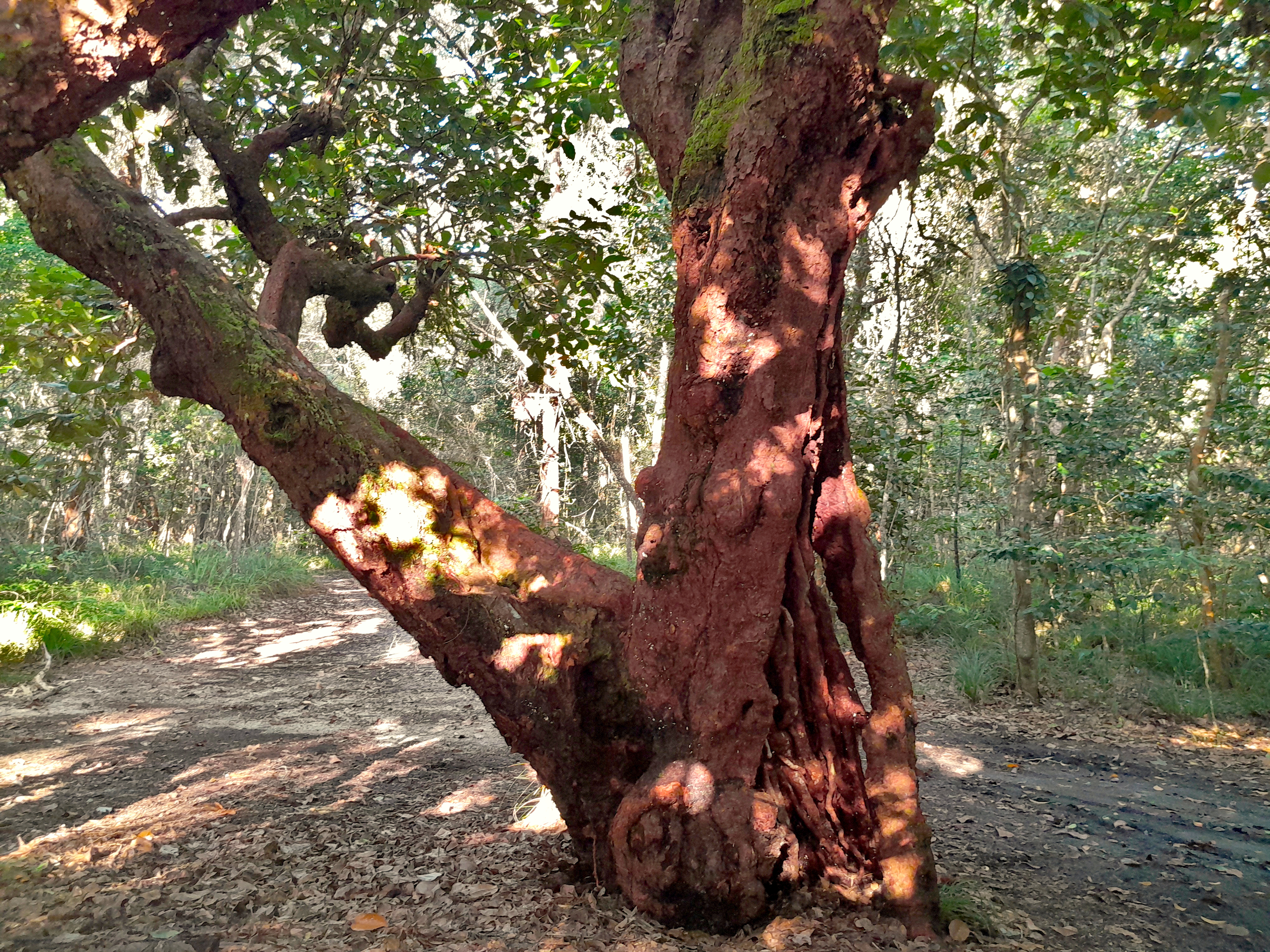
Trunk showing red flaky bark

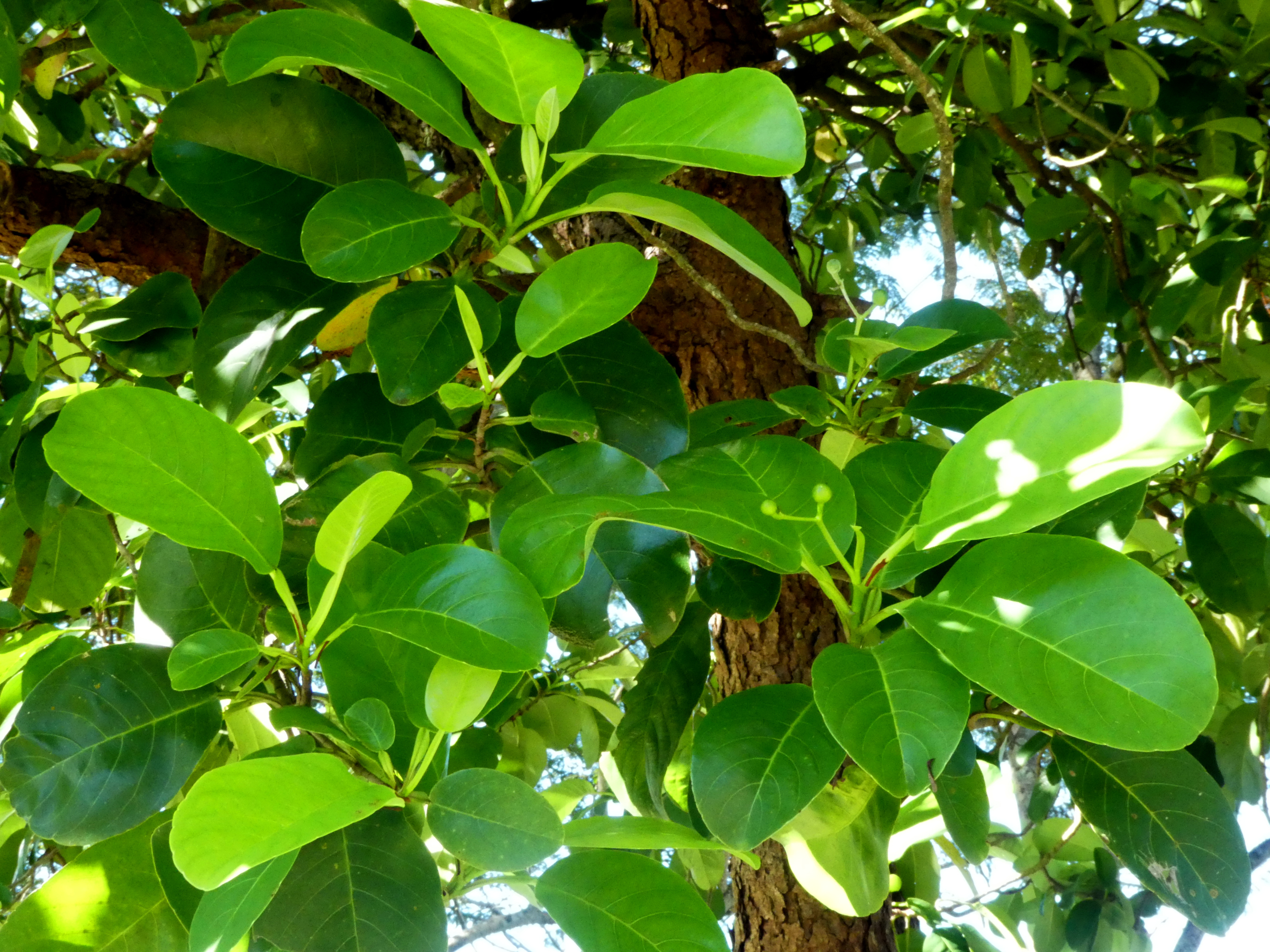
Foliage

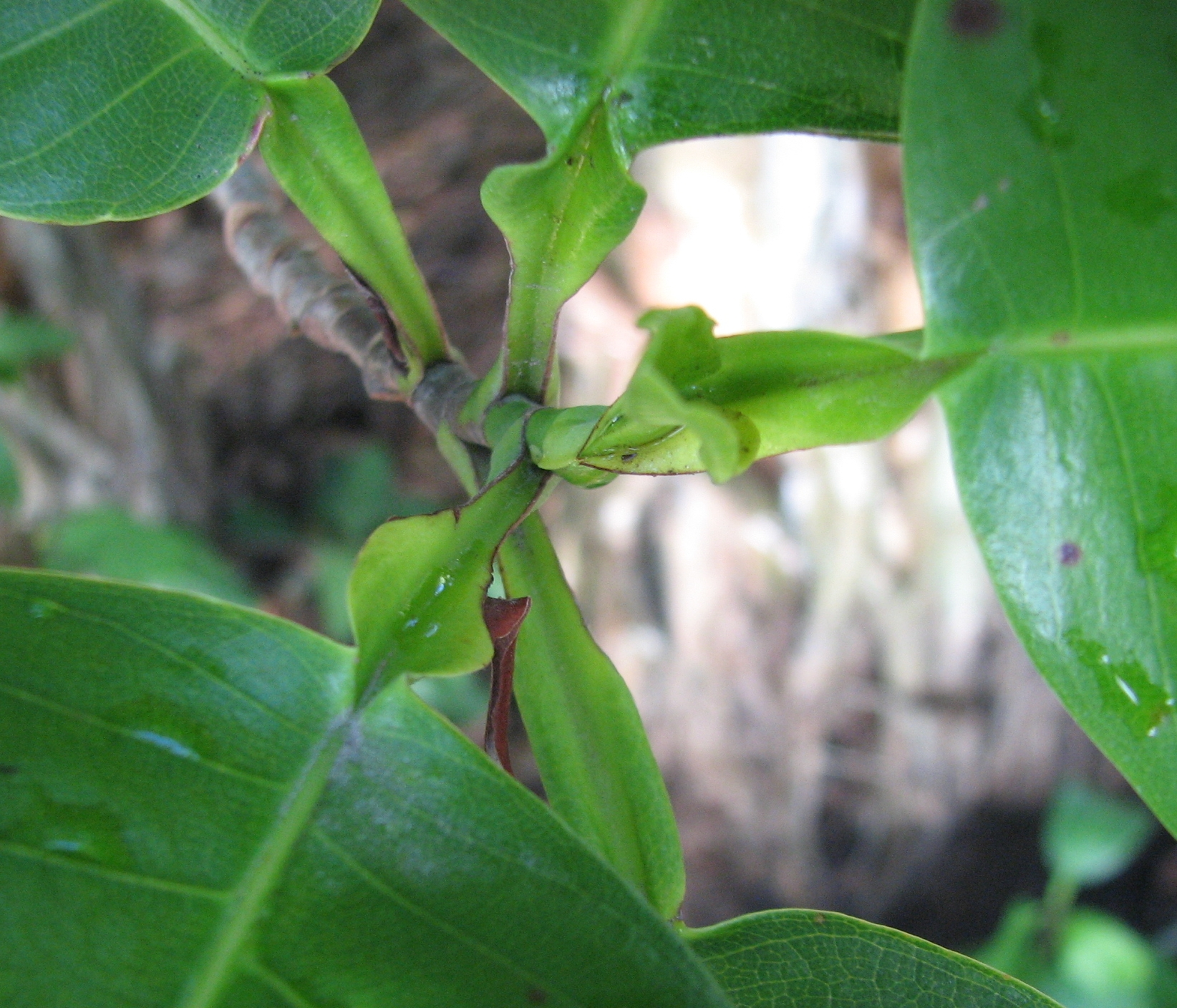
Distinctive flattened petioles

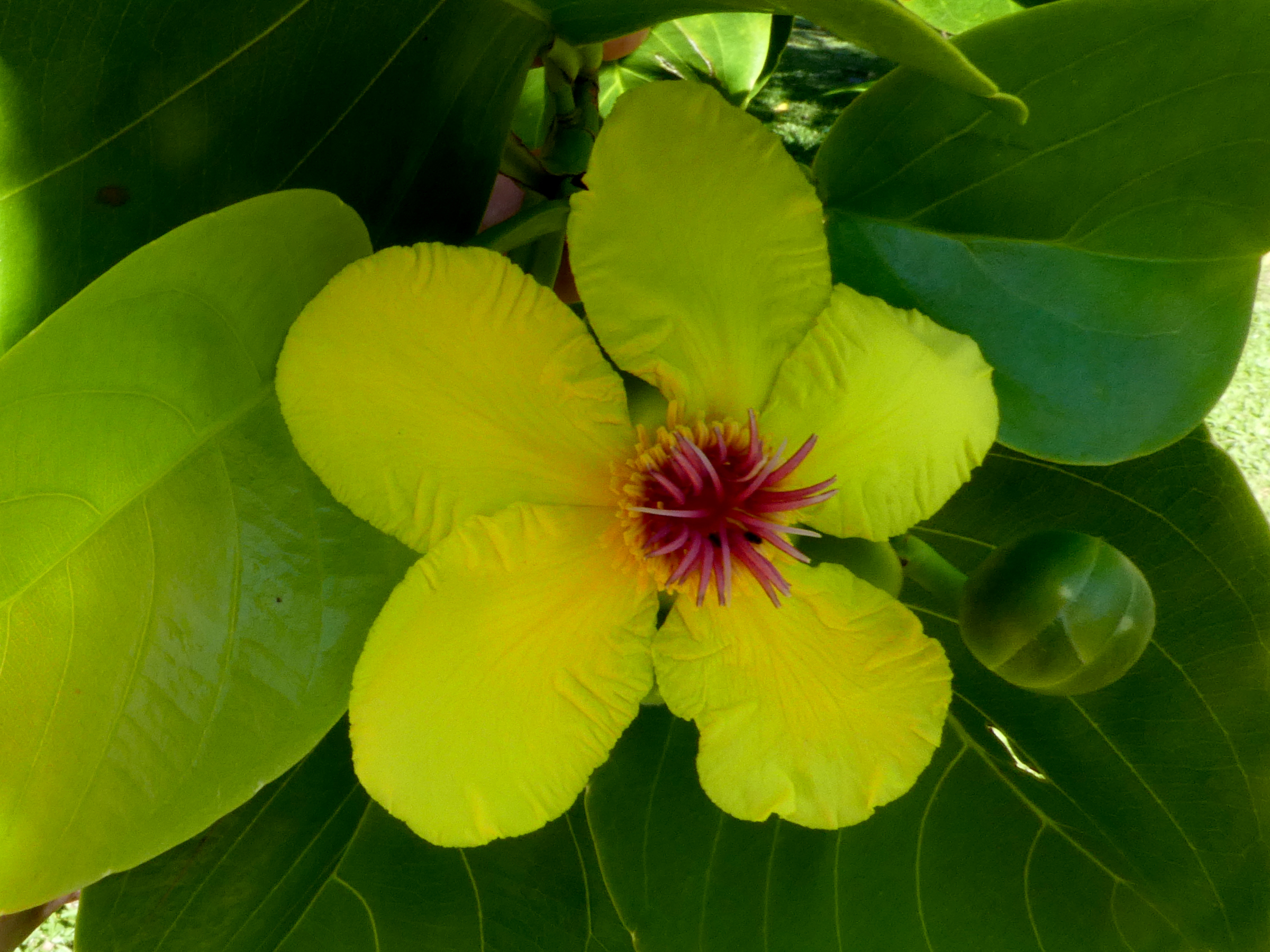
Flower

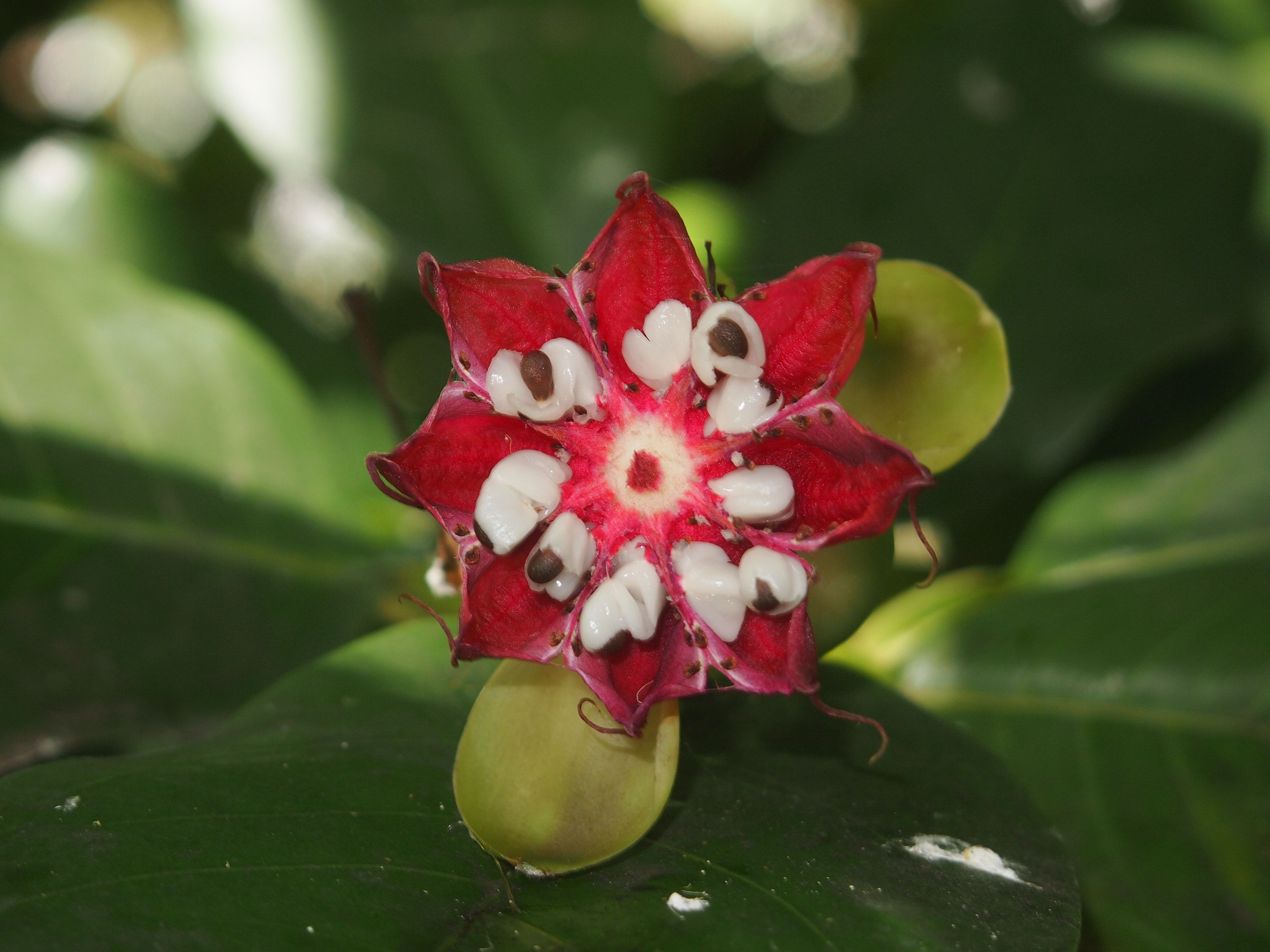
Dehisced fruit with seeds
