= Thyrassia virescens =

Scientific classification
- Kingdom: Animalia
- Phylum: Arthropoda
- Class: Insecta
- Order: Lepidoptera
- Family: Zygaenidae
- Genus: Thyrassia
- Species: T. virescens

Binomial name
- Thyrassia virescens Hampson, 1892

Species of moth

Thyrassia virescens is a moth in the family Zygaenidae. It was described by George Hampson in 1892 from Sri Lanka. The only known host plant of this insect is Cissus quadrangularis Linnaeus, 1767 (Vitaceae).
