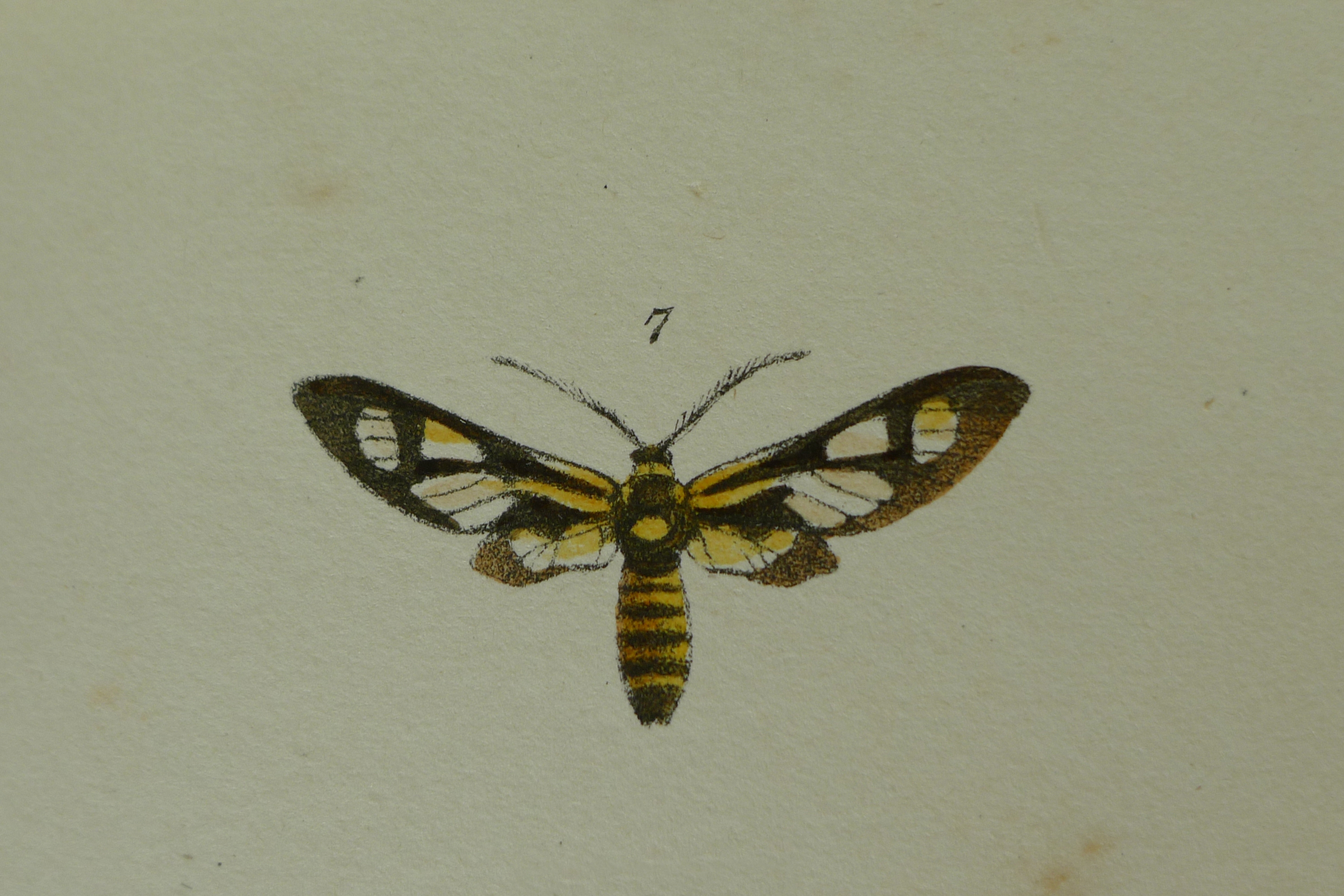
- T. p. penangae
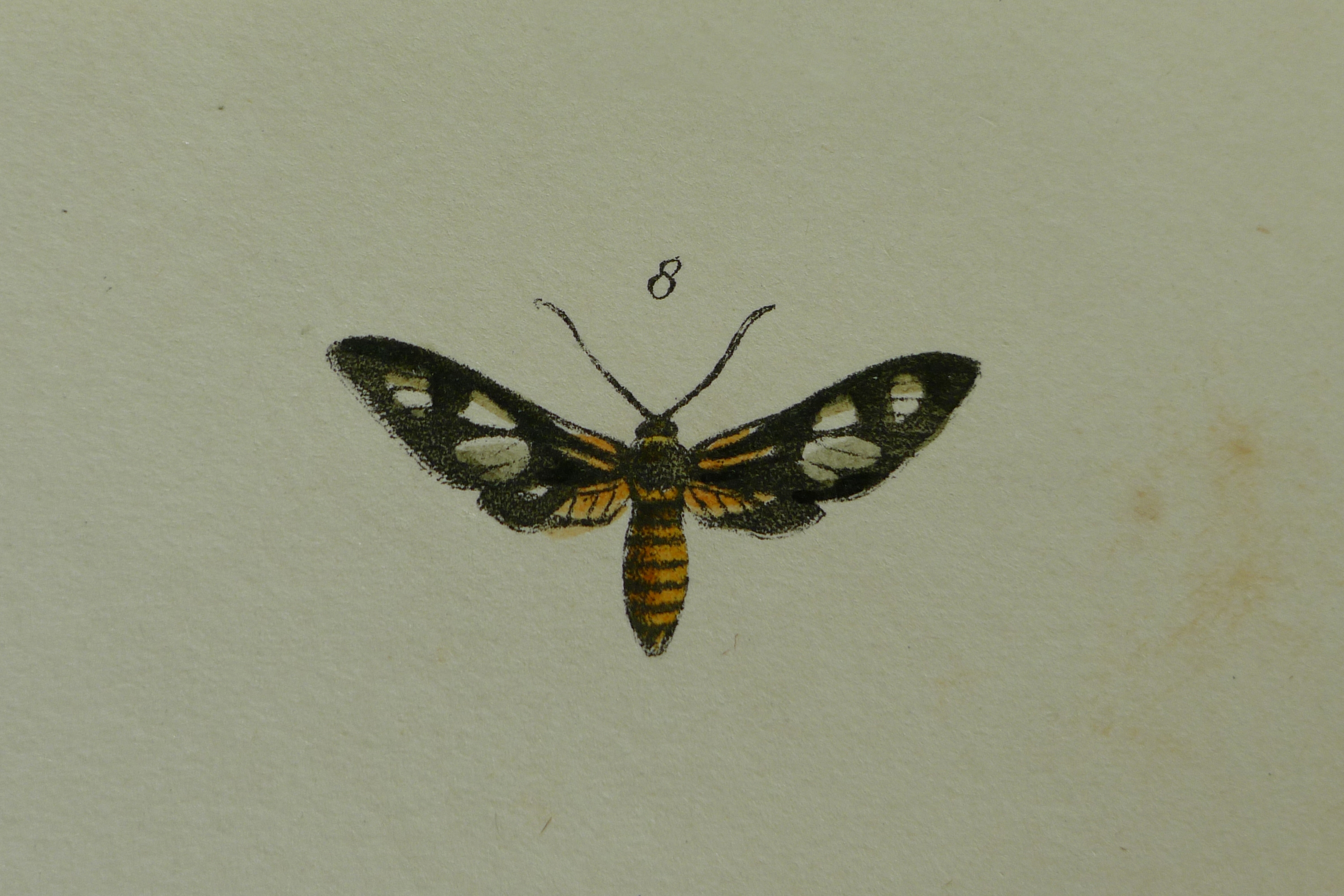
- T. p. rafflesi

Scientific classification
- Domain: Eukaryota
- Kingdom: Animalia
- Phylum: Arthropoda
- Class: Insecta
- Order: Lepidoptera
- Family: Zygaenidae
- Genus: Thyrassia
- Species: T. penangae

Binomial name
- Thyrassia penangae (Moore, 1859)

Synonyms
- Syntomis penangae Moore, 1859; Syntomis rafflesi Moore, 1859; Thyrassia rafflesi

= Thyrassia penangae =

Species of moth

Thyrassia penangae is a species of moth in the family Zygaenidae. It is found in south-east Asia, including Peninsular Malaysia and China.

== Subspecies ==
- Thyrassia penangae penangae
- Thyrassia penangae rafflesi Moore, 1859
