= Pseudoamuria =

Scientific classification
- Kingdom: Animalia
- Phylum: Arthropoda
- Clade: Pancrustacea
- Class: Insecta
- Order: Lepidoptera
- Family: Zygaenidae
- Subfamily: Procridinae
- Genus: Pseudoamuria; Tarmann, 2005

Genus of moths

Pseudoamuria is a genus of moths of the family Zygaenidae.

== Species ==
- Pseudoamuria neglecta Tarmann, 2005
- Pseudoamuria uptoni Tarmann, 2005
