= Thyrassia procumbens =

Scientific classification
- Kingdom: Animalia
- Phylum: Arthropoda
- Class: Insecta
- Order: Lepidoptera
- Family: Zygaenidae
- Genus: Thyrassia
- Species: T. procumbens

Binomial name
- Thyrassia procumbens Snellen, 1895

Species of moth

Thyrassia procumbens is a species of moth in the family Zygaenidae. It is found on Java and Sumatra.

The wingspan is 14–23 mm.

The larvae feed on Cayratia trifolia.
