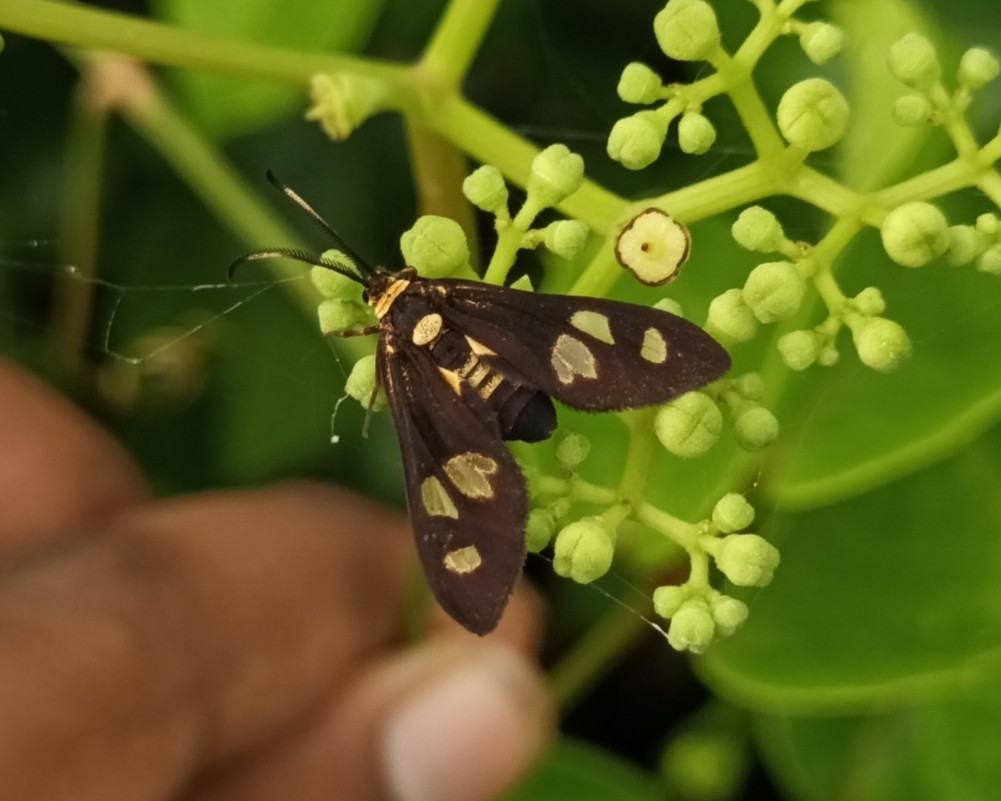

Scientific classification
- Kingdom: Animalia
- Phylum: Arthropoda
- Clade: Pancrustacea
- Class: Insecta
- Order: Lepidoptera
- Family: Zygaenidae
- Genus: Thyrassia
- Species: T. subcordata

Binomial name
- Thyrassia subcordata (Walker, 1854)

Synonyms
- Syntomis subcordata Walker, 1854

= Thyrassia subcordata =

Species of moth

Thyrassia subcordata is a moth in the family Zygaenidae. It was described by Francis Walker in 1854 from Sri Lanka. It lives also in parts of India. One subspecies is recorded, Thyrassia subcordata aurodisca Hampson, 1891.

== Distribution ==
It has been spotted primarily in West Bengal in May.

== Description ==
It's blackish brown, the head, proboscis, prothorax and scutellum are luteos. The vertex is black, palpi black and short.

The third joint is small, the wings are moderately broad and the fore wings with three luteous-hyaline spots, two of them forming a short interrupted band beyond the middle, the hind one heart shaped, the third smaller and near the tip. Hind wings with a brighter opake luteos spot at the base.

The abdomen before the middle with a luteos band, which is interrupted beneath and sometimes partly above. Legs are slender, hind tibiae without median spurs.
