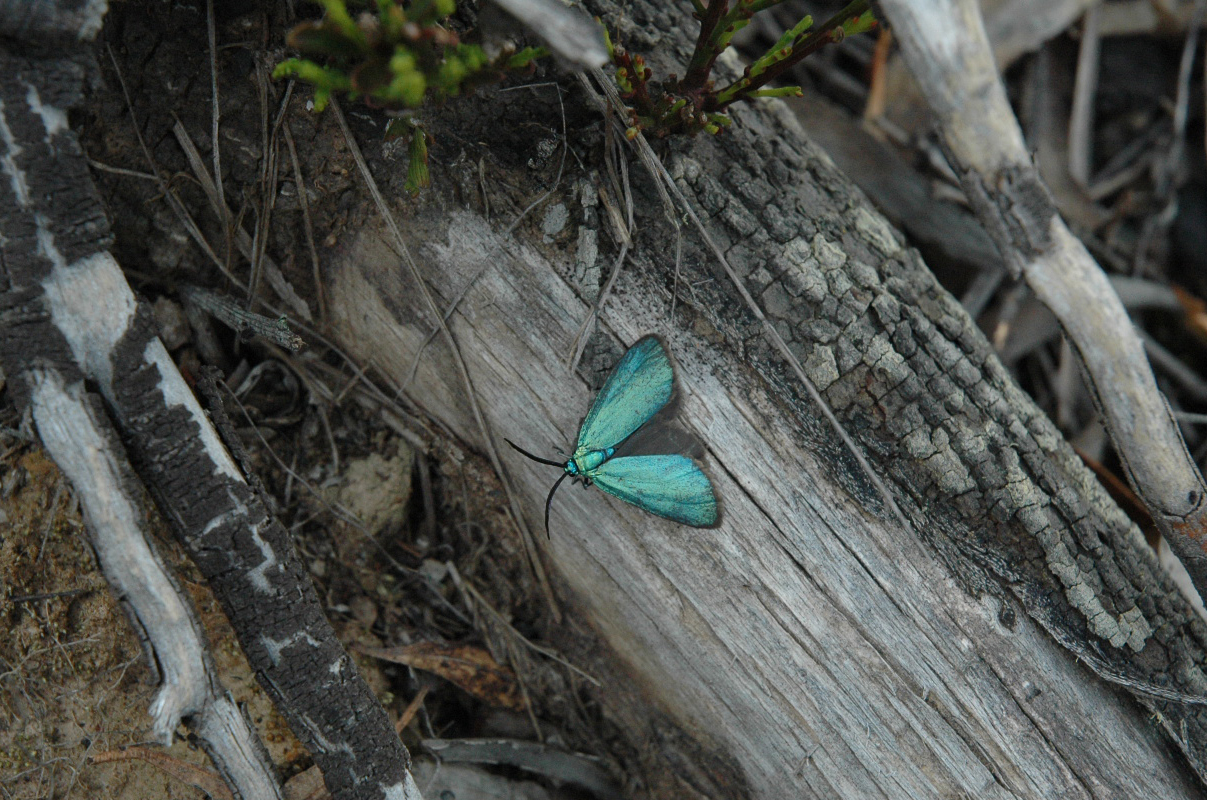

Scientific classification
- Kingdom: Animalia
- Phylum: Arthropoda
- Clade: Pancrustacea
- Class: Insecta
- Order: Lepidoptera
- Family: Zygaenidae
- Genus: Pollanisus
- Species: P. viridipulverulenta

Binomial name
- Pollanisus viridipulverulenta (Guérin-Méneville, 1839)

Synonyms
- Pollanisus viridipulverulentus; Procris viridipulverulenta Guérin-Méneville, 1839; Pollanisus adelaidae Turner, 1926

= Pollanisus viridipulverulenta =

Species of moth

Pollanisus viridipulverulenta, the satin-green forester, is a moth of the family Zygaenidae. It is found in the eastern part of Australia (Queensland, New South Wales, Australian Capital Territory, Victoria, South Australia and Tasmania).

== Description ==
The adult moth has head, thorax and forewings metallic blue-green, while the hindwings are grey. The wingspan is about 30 mm. The length of the forewings is 11–13 mm for males and 8–9 mm for females. The female has a yellow tuft of hair at the tip of the abdomen. This species resembles other adult moths in the genus such as P. apicalis (generally smaller with narrower wings) and P. subdolosa (distinguishable by a bronze "collar" behind the head).

The larva is brown and has clumps of short hair.

== Life cycle ==
Adults are on wing from August and early September (in Queensland and South Australia) to January (in Tasmania).. Female moths camouflage their eggs using hairs from their abdominal tufts.

The larvae feed on various Hibbertia species, including Hibbertia obtusifolia, Hibbertia stricta and Hibbertia sericea. They pupate in cocoons amongst the foliage or in the leaf litter at the feet of host plants.
