= Onceropyga =

Scientific classification
- Domain: Eukaryota
- Kingdom: Animalia
- Phylum: Arthropoda
- Class: Insecta
- Order: Lepidoptera
- Family: Zygaenidae
- Subfamily: Procridinae
- Genus: Onceropyga; Turner, 1906

Genus of moths

Onceropyga is a genus of moths of the family Zygaenidae.

== Species ==
- Onceropyga anelia Turner, 1906
- Onceropyga pulchra Tarmann, 2005
