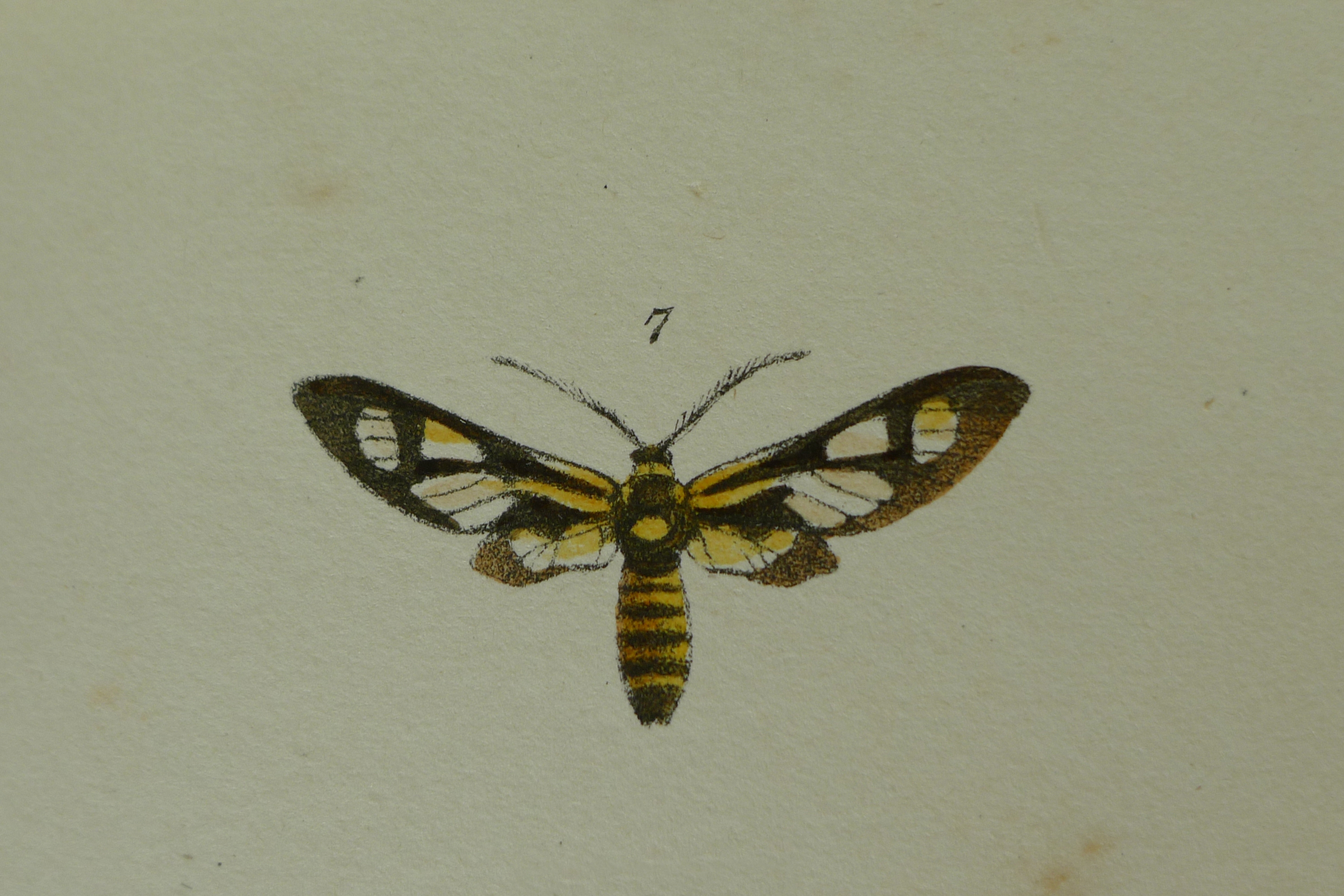
- Thyrassia penangae

Scientific classification
- Domain: Eukaryota
- Kingdom: Animalia
- Phylum: Arthropoda
- Class: Insecta
- Order: Lepidoptera
- Family: Zygaenidae
- Subfamily: Procridinae
- Genus: Thyrassia; Butler, 1876

Synonyms
- Acutia Kaye, 1919; Atucia A. Watson, T. B. Fletcher & Nye, 1980

= Thyrassia =

Genus of moths

Thyrassia is a genus of moths of the family Zygaenidae described by Arthur Gardiner Butler in 1876.

== Selected species ==
- Thyrassia aprepes Swinhoe, 1905
- Thyrassia aurodisca Hampson, 1891
- Thyrassia diversa Walker, 1864
- Thyrassia inconcinna Swinhoe, 1892
- Thyrassia penangae (Moore, 1859)
- Thyrassia philippina Jordan, 1908
- Thyrassia procumbens Snellen, 1895
- Thyrassia scutellaris Jordan, 1925
- Thyrassia subcordata Walker, 1854
- Thyrassia virescens Hampson, 1892
