= Pollanisus marriotti =

Scientific classification
- Domain: Eukaryota
- Kingdom: Animalia
- Phylum: Arthropoda
- Class: Insecta
- Order: Lepidoptera
- Family: Zygaenidae
- Genus: Pollanisus
- Species: P. marriotti

Binomial name
- Pollanisus marriotti Kallies & Mollet, 2011

Species of moth

Pollanisus marriotti is a moth of the family Zygaenidae. It is found in Australia, where it has been recorded from Victoria.
