= Myrtartona =

Scientific classification
- Kingdom: Animalia
- Phylum: Arthropoda
- Clade: Pancrustacea
- Class: Insecta
- Order: Lepidoptera
- Family: Zygaenidae
- Subfamily: Procridinae
- Genus: Myrtartona; Tarmann, 2005

Genus of moths

Myrtartona is a genus of moths of the family Zygaenidae.

== Species ==
- Myrtartona coronias (Meyrick, 1886)
- Myrtartona leucopleura (Meyrick, 1886)
- Myrtartona mariannae Tarmann, 2005
- Myrtartona rufiventris (Walker, 1854)
