= Hestiochora =

Scientific classification
- Kingdom: Animalia
- Phylum: Arthropoda
- Class: Insecta
- Order: Lepidoptera
- Family: Zygaenidae
- Subfamily: Procridinae
- Genus: Hestiochora; Meyrick, 1886

Genus of moths

Hestiochora is a genus of moths of the family Zygaenidae.

== Species ==
- Hestiochora continentalis Tarmann, 2005
- Hestiochora erythrota Meyrick, 1886
- Hestiochora furcata Tarmann, 2005
- Hestiochora intermixta Tarmann, 2005
- Hestiochora occidentalis Tarmann, 2005
- Hestiochora queenslandensis Tarmann, 2005
- Hestiochora tricolor (Walker, 1854)
- Hestiochora xanthocoma Meyrick, 1886
