= Pollanisus eumetopus =

Scientific classification
- Domain: Eukaryota
- Kingdom: Animalia
- Phylum: Arthropoda
- Class: Insecta
- Order: Lepidoptera
- Family: Zygaenidae
- Genus: Pollanisus
- Species: P. eumetopus

Binomial name
- Pollanisus eumetopus Turner, 1926

Species of moth

Pollanisus eumetopus is a moth of the family Zygaenidae. It is found along the coast of north-eastern Queensland, Australia.

The length of the forewings is 6–7 mm for males and 5.5–7.5 mm for females. There are probably multiple generations per year.

The larvae feed on Pipturus argenteus.
