= Homophylotis thyridota =

Scientific classification
- Domain: Eukaryota
- Kingdom: Animalia
- Phylum: Arthropoda
- Class: Insecta
- Order: Lepidoptera
- Family: Zygaenidae
- Genus: Homophylotis
- Species: H. thyridota

Binomial name
- Homophylotis thyridota Turner, 1904

Species of moth

Homophylotis thyridota is a species of moth in the family Zygaenidae. It is found in Australia from north-eastern Queensland.

The length of the forewings is 5–5.5 mm for males and 5 mm for females.
