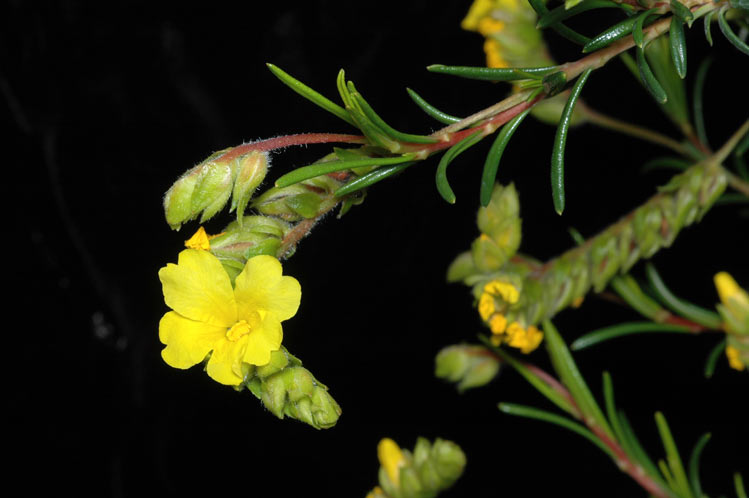
- In the Australian National Botanic Gardens

Scientific classification
- Kingdom: Plantae
- Clade: Tracheophytes
- Clade: Angiosperms
- Clade: Eudicots
- Order: Dilleniales
- Family: Dilleniaceae
- Genus: Hibbertia
- Species: H. spicata

Binomial name
- Hibbertia spicata Diels

= Hibbertia spicata =

Species of flowering plant

Hibbertia spicata is a species of flowering plant in the family Dilleniaceae and is endemic to the west of Western Australia. It is a low, erect to spreading shrub with scattered linear leaves with the edges rolled under and yellow flowers with six or seven stamens on one side of two softly-hairy carpels, and a larger number of staminodes.

== Description ==
Hibbertia spicata is an erect to spreading shrub that typically grows to a height of up to 70 cm (28 in), its older stems covered with papery bark. The leaves are linear, mostly 12–25 mm (0.47–0.98 in) long and 1.2–2.0 mm (0.047–0.079 in) wide with the edges rolled under, sometimes obscuring the hairy lower surface. The flowers are crowded along a cincinnus of eight to fourteen flowers, all but the lowest with two bracts at the base. The five sepals are egg-shaped, 5–7 mm (0.20–0.28 in) long and the five petals are yellow, 7.5–8 mm (0.30–0.31 in) long and egg-shaped with the narrower end towards the base. There are six or seven stamens fused at the base on one side of the two softly-hairy carpels, and ten to fourteen staminodes arranged around the carpels, each carpel with two ovules. Flowering occurs from April to October.

== Taxonomy ==
Hibbertia spicata was first formally described in 1860 by Ferdinand von Mueller in Fragmenta Phytographiae Australiae from specimens collected at Port Gregory by Pemberton Walcott and Augustus Frederick Oldfield. The specific epithet (spicata) means "spicate".

In 1984, Judith Roderick Wheeler described two subspecies and the names are accepted by the Australian Plant Census:

- Hibbertia spicata subsp. leptotheca K.R.Thiele has few, or no staminodes, and the outer two sepals more or less glabrous;
- Hibbertia spicata F.Muell. subsp. spicata has six to twelve staminodes and the outer two sepals are hairy.

== Distribution and habitat ==
Subspecies leptotheca grows on near-coastal limestone between Lancelin and the Yalgorup National Park and subspecies spicata grows in a variety of soils in heathland on the Darling Range.

== See also ==
- List of Hibbertia species
