= Hestiochora intermixta =

Scientific classification
- Kingdom: Animalia
- Phylum: Arthropoda
- Clade: Pancrustacea
- Class: Insecta
- Order: Lepidoptera
- Family: Zygaenidae
- Genus: Hestiochora
- Species: H. intermixta

Binomial name
- Hestiochora intermixta Tarmann, 2005

Species of moth

Hestiochora intermixta is a moth of the family Zygaenidae. It is found in Australia from Queensland, New South Wales and South Australia.
