= Myrtartona leucopleura =

Scientific classification
- Kingdom: Animalia
- Phylum: Arthropoda
- Clade: Pancrustacea
- Class: Insecta
- Order: Lepidoptera
- Family: Zygaenidae
- Genus: Myrtartona
- Species: M. leucopleura

Binomial name
- Myrtartona leucopleura (Meyrick, 1886)

Synonyms
- Procris leucopleura Meyrick, 1886; Adscita leucopleura; Pollanisus leucopleura

Species of moth

Myrtartona leucopleura is a species of moth in the family Zygaenidae. It is found in Queensland, New South Wales and the Australian Capital Territory.

The length of the forewings is 8–8.5 millimetres (0.31–0.33 in) for males.

Adults have been reported exhibiting thanatosis when disturbed.

The larvae possibly feed on Leptospermum or Eucalyptus species.
