= Homophylotis artonoides =

Scientific classification
- Kingdom: Animalia
- Phylum: Arthropoda
- Clade: Pancrustacea
- Class: Insecta
- Order: Lepidoptera
- Family: Zygaenidae
- Genus: Homophylotis
- Species: H. artonoides

Binomial name
- Homophylotis artonoides Tarmann, 2005

Species of moth

Homophylotis artonoides is a species of moth in the family Zygaenidae. It is found in Australia from Queensland (Cape York).

The length of the forewings is about 5 mm for males and females.
