= Onceropyga anelia =

Scientific classification
- Domain: Eukaryota
- Kingdom: Animalia
- Phylum: Arthropoda
- Class: Insecta
- Order: Lepidoptera
- Family: Zygaenidae
- Genus: Onceropyga
- Species: O. anelia

Binomial name
- Onceropyga anelia Turner, 1906

Species of moth

Onceropyga anelia is a species of moth in the family Zygaenidae. It is found in Australia in eastern Queensland and the northern parts of eastern New South Wales.

The length of the forewings is 6–6.5 mm for males and 7 mm for females.

The larvae feed on Cissus antarctica.
