= Pollanisus calliceros =

Scientific classification
- Domain: Eukaryota
- Kingdom: Animalia
- Phylum: Arthropoda
- Class: Insecta
- Order: Lepidoptera
- Family: Zygaenidae
- Genus: Pollanisus
- Species: P. calliceros

Binomial name
- Pollanisus calliceros Turner, 1926

Species of moth

Pollanisus calliceros is a moth of the family Zygaenidae. It is found in Australia in Tasmania, Victoria and New South Wales.

The length of the forewings is 6.5–8 mm for males. There is one generation with adults on wing in mid-summer.

== Subspecies ==
- Pollanisus calliceros calliceros Turner, 1926 (Tasmania, the mountains of Victoria and southernmost New South Wales)
- Pollanisus calliceros azurea Tarmann, 2005 (mountains of central and northern New South Wales)
