= Onceropyga pulchra =

Scientific classification
- Kingdom: Animalia
- Phylum: Arthropoda
- Clade: Pancrustacea
- Class: Insecta
- Order: Lepidoptera
- Family: Zygaenidae
- Genus: Onceropyga
- Species: O. pulchra

Binomial name
- Onceropyga pulchra Tarmann, 2005

Species of moth

Onceropyga pulchra is a species of moth in the family Zygaenidae. It is found in Australia in south-eastern Queensland and eastern New South Wales.

The length of the forewings is 6.5 mm for males and 8 mm for females.
