= Myrtartona coronias =

Scientific classification
- Kingdom: Animalia
- Phylum: Arthropoda
- Clade: Pancrustacea
- Class: Insecta
- Order: Lepidoptera
- Family: Zygaenidae
- Genus: Myrtartona
- Species: M. coronias

Binomial name
- Myrtartona coronias (Meyrick, 1886)

Synonyms
- Procris coronias Meyrick, 1886; Adscita coronias; Turneriptocris coronias

Species of moth

Myrtartona coronias is a species of moth in the family Zygaenidae. It is found in eastern and south-eastern Australia, from southern Queensland to Tasmania.

The length of the forewings is 8–9 millimetres (0.31–0.35 in) for males.

The larvae feed on Melaleuca species and possibly Kunzea ambigua and the flowers and buds of Leptospermum juniperinum.
