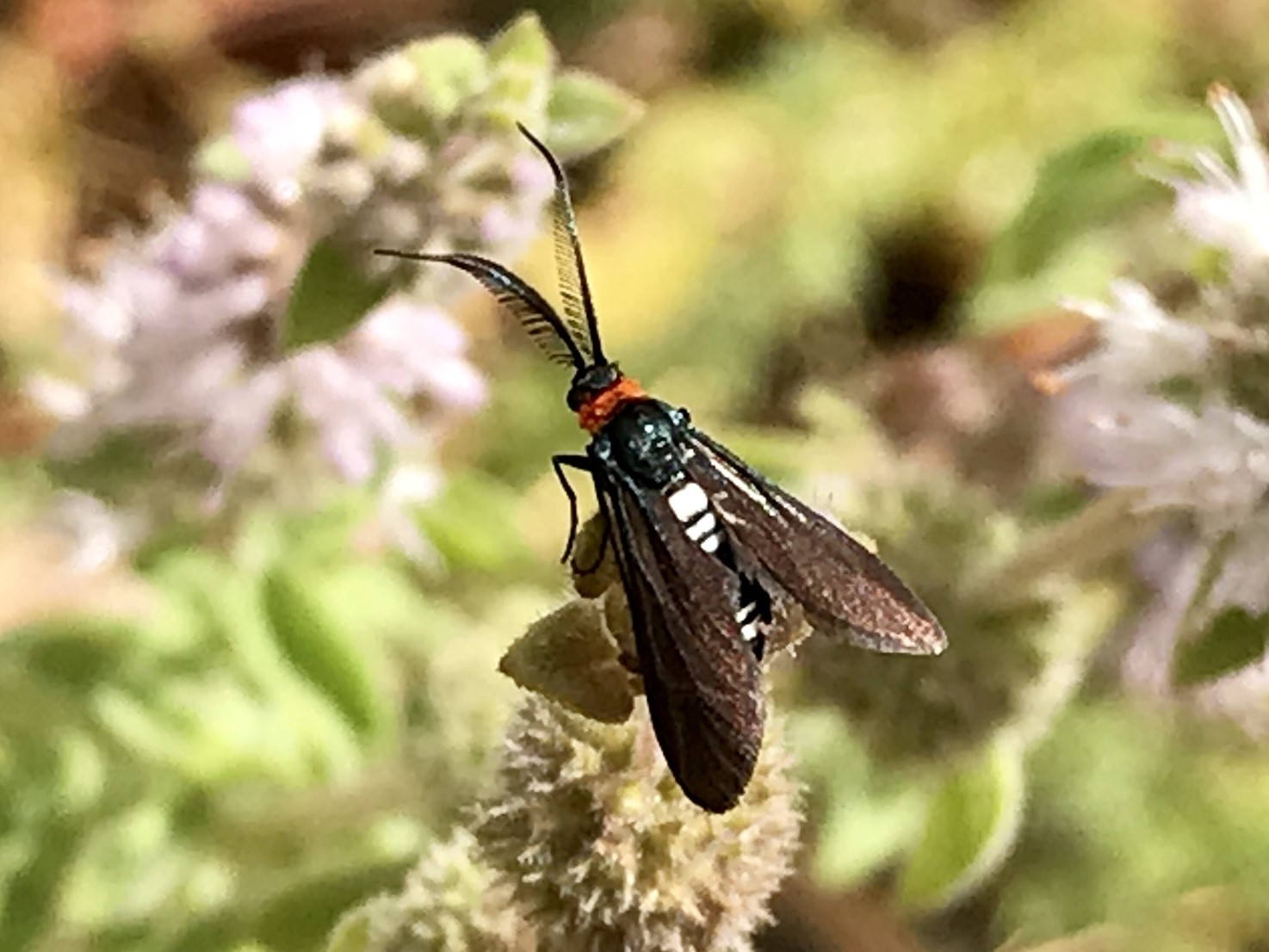

Scientific classification
- Kingdom: Animalia
- Phylum: Arthropoda
- Clade: Pancrustacea
- Class: Insecta
- Order: Lepidoptera
- Family: Zygaenidae
- Genus: Hestiochora
- Species: H. occidentalis

Binomial name
- Hestiochora occidentalis Tarmann, 2005

= Hestiochora occidentalis =

Species of moth

Hestiochora occidentalis is a species of moth in the family Zygaenidae. It is endemic to the temperate parts of Western Australia.

The length of the forewings is 7.5–9 mm for males and 8.5–9 mm for females. It is a tropical species with possibly several generations per year.

The ecology is unknown, but the species has been found on localities dominated by Eucalyptus calophylla, Eucalyptus marginata and Eucalyptus rudis.
