= Pollanisus commoni =

Scientific classification
- Kingdom: Animalia
- Phylum: Arthropoda
- Clade: Pancrustacea
- Class: Insecta
- Order: Lepidoptera
- Family: Zygaenidae
- Genus: Pollanisus
- Species: P. commoni

Binomial name
- Pollanisus commoni Tarmann, 2005

Species of moth

Pollanisus commoni is a moth of the family Zygaenidae. It is found along the coast of north-eastern Queensland, Australia.

The length of the forewings is 7–7.5 mm for males and 6.5–7.5 mm for females.

Larvae have been reared on Dillenia alata.
