= Pollanisus acharon =

Scientific classification
- Domain: Eukaryota
- Kingdom: Animalia
- Phylum: Arthropoda
- Class: Insecta
- Order: Lepidoptera
- Family: Zygaenidae
- Genus: Pollanisus
- Species: P. acharon

Binomial name
- Pollanisus acharon (Fabricius, 1775)

Synonyms
- Zygaena acharon Fabricius, 1775

Species of moth

Pollanisus acharon is a moth of the family Zygaenidae. It is only known from the type specimen, a female probably collected in Cooktown in north-eastern Queensland, Australia.

The length of the forewings is about 7 mm for females.
