= Pollanisus angustifrons =

Scientific classification
- Kingdom: Animalia
- Phylum: Arthropoda
- Clade: Pancrustacea
- Class: Insecta
- Order: Lepidoptera
- Family: Zygaenidae
- Genus: Pollanisus
- Species: P. angustifrons

Binomial name
- Pollanisus angustifrons Tarmann, 2005

Species of moth

Pollanisus angustifrons is a moth of the family Zygaenidae. It is found in north-eastern Queensland, Australia.

The length of the forewings is 7–7.5 mm for males. Adults have only been collected in March and April, but there are probably two or more generations per year.
