= Hestiochora queenslandensis =

Scientific classification
- Kingdom: Animalia
- Phylum: Arthropoda
- Clade: Pancrustacea
- Class: Insecta
- Order: Lepidoptera
- Family: Zygaenidae
- Genus: Hestiochora
- Species: H. queenslandensis

Binomial name
- Hestiochora queenslandensis Tarmann, 2005

Species of moth

Hestiochora queenslandensis is a moth of the family Zygaenidae. It is found in Australia from south-eastern Queensland and northern New South Wales.

The length of the forewings is 7.5–9 mm for males and 8.5–10 mm for females. There are at least two generations per year.
