= Pollanisus cyanota =

Scientific classification
- Kingdom: Animalia
- Phylum: Arthropoda
- Class: Insecta
- Order: Lepidoptera
- Family: Zygaenidae
- Genus: Pollanisus
- Species: P. cyanota

Binomial name
- Pollanisus cyanota (Meyrick, 1886)

Synonyms
- Procris cyanota Meyrick, 1886; Pollanisus cyanotus; Pollanisus cyanotas

Species of moth

Pollanisus cyanota is a moth of the family Zygaenidae. It is found in Australia in south-eastern Queensland, New South Wales and Victoria.

The length of the forewings is 6–6.5 mm for males and females. There are two generations per year.

Adults are metallic dark green with pale speckles.
