= Pollanisus trimacula =

Scientific classification
- Kingdom: Animalia
- Phylum: Arthropoda
- Class: Insecta
- Order: Lepidoptera
- Family: Zygaenidae
- Genus: Pollanisus
- Species: P. trimacula

Binomial name
- Pollanisus trimacula (Walker, 1854)

Synonyms
- Procris trimacula Walker, 1854; Pollanisus trimaculus

Species of moth

Pollanisus trimacula is a moth of the family Zygaenidae. It is found in Australia in south-eastern Queensland and eastern parts of New South Wales.

The length of the forewings is 7.5–9.5 mm for males and 8–9 mm for females. There are probably two generations per year, with adults on wing in late summer and spring.

Larvae have been reared on Hibbertia scandens and Hibbertia dentata.
