= Pollanisus lithopastus =

Scientific classification
- Domain: Eukaryota
- Kingdom: Animalia
- Phylum: Arthropoda
- Class: Insecta
- Order: Lepidoptera
- Family: Zygaenidae
- Genus: Pollanisus
- Species: P. lithopastus

Binomial name
- Pollanisus lithopastus Turner, 1926

Species of moth

Pollanisus lithopastus is a moth of the family Zygaenidae. It is found in Australia from northern New South Wales to Victoria and Tasmania. It is mostly found in mountainous areas at higher elevations, but has also been found at sea level, especially in Tasmania.

The length of the forewings is 8.5–9.5 mm for males and 7–8 mm for females.
