= Myrtartona mariannae =

Scientific classification
- Kingdom: Animalia
- Phylum: Arthropoda
- Clade: Pancrustacea
- Class: Insecta
- Order: Lepidoptera
- Family: Zygaenidae
- Genus: Myrtartona
- Species: M. mariannae

Binomial name
- Myrtartona mariannae Tarmann, 2005

Species of moth

Myrtartona mariannae is a species of moth in the family Zygaenidae. It is only known from Milmerran in south-eastern Queensland.

The length of the forewings is 8.5 millimetres (0.33 in) for males.

== Etymology ==
The species is named for Marianne Horak.
