= Pseudoamuria uptoni =

Scientific classification
- Kingdom: Animalia
- Phylum: Arthropoda
- Clade: Pancrustacea
- Class: Insecta
- Order: Lepidoptera
- Family: Zygaenidae
- Genus: Pseudoamuria
- Species: P. uptoni

Binomial name
- Pseudoamuria uptoni Tarmann, 2005

Species of moth

Pseudoamuria uptoni is a moth of the family Zygaenidae. It is found in Cape York, Queensland, Australia.

The length of the forewings is 6.5 mm for males and 7 mm for females.
