= Pollanisus modestus =

Scientific classification
- Kingdom: Animalia
- Phylum: Arthropoda
- Clade: Pancrustacea
- Class: Insecta
- Order: Lepidoptera
- Family: Zygaenidae
- Genus: Pollanisus
- Species: P. modestus

Binomial name
- Pollanisus modestus Tarmann, 2005

Species of moth

Pollanisus modestus is a moth of the family Zygaenidae. It is only known from Clyde Mountain in New South Wales, Australia.

The type location is a slightly damp heath-like clearing with Hibbertia species.

The length of the forewings is about 7.5 mm for males.
