= Pollanisus isolatus =

Scientific classification
- Domain: Eukaryota
- Kingdom: Animalia
- Phylum: Arthropoda
- Class: Insecta
- Order: Lepidoptera
- Family: Zygaenidae
- Genus: Pollanisus
- Species: P. isolatus

Binomial name
- Pollanisus isolatus Tarmann, 2005

Species of moth

Pollanisus isolatus is a moth of the family Zygaenidae. It is only known from the type location Beaconsfield in Victoria, Australia.

The length of the forewings is about 7 mm for males.
