= Thyrassia inconcinna =

Scientific classification
- Domain: Eukaryota
- Kingdom: Animalia
- Phylum: Arthropoda
- Class: Insecta
- Order: Lepidoptera
- Family: Zygaenidae
- Genus: Thyrassia
- Species: T. inconcinna

Binomial name
- Thyrassia inconcinna C. Swinhoe, 1892

Synonyms
- Monoschalis mimetica Turner, 1902; Thyrassia mimetica

Species of moth

Thyrassia inconcinna is a species of moth in the family Zygaenidae first described by Charles Swinhoe in 1892. It is found in Queensland, Australia.

There are at least two generations per year.

The length of the forewings is 10–11 mm for males and 12-12.5 mm for females.

The larvae feed on Vitis species.
