= Pollanisus subdolosa =

Scientific classification
- Kingdom: Animalia
- Phylum: Arthropoda
- Class: Insecta
- Order: Lepidoptera
- Family: Zygaenidae
- Genus: Pollanisus
- Species: P. subdolosa

Binomial name
- Pollanisus subdolosa (Walker, 1865)

Synonyms
- Procris subdolosa Walker, 1865; Pollanisus subdolosus

Species of moth

Pollanisus subdolosa is a moth of the family Zygaenidae. It is found in Australia in Victoria and from south-eastern Queensland to New South Wales.

The length of the forewings is 7.5–10.5 mm for males and 7–8 mm for females. There are two generations per year.

The larvae feed on Hibbertia scandens.

== Subspecies ==
- Pollanisus subdolosa subdolosa Walker, 1865 (Victoria)
- Pollanisus subdolosa clara Tarmann, 2005 (south-eastern Queensland to New South Wales)
