= Pollanisus incertus =

Scientific classification
- Domain: Eukaryota
- Kingdom: Animalia
- Phylum: Arthropoda
- Class: Insecta
- Order: Lepidoptera
- Family: Zygaenidae
- Genus: Pollanisus
- Species: P. incertus

Binomial name
- Pollanisus incertus Tarmann, 2005

Species of moth

Pollanisus incertus is a moth of the family Zygaenidae. It is found along the coast of north-eastern Queensland, Australia.

The length of the forewings is about 8 mm for males and about 8.5 mm for females.

The larvae feed on Tetracera nordtiana.
