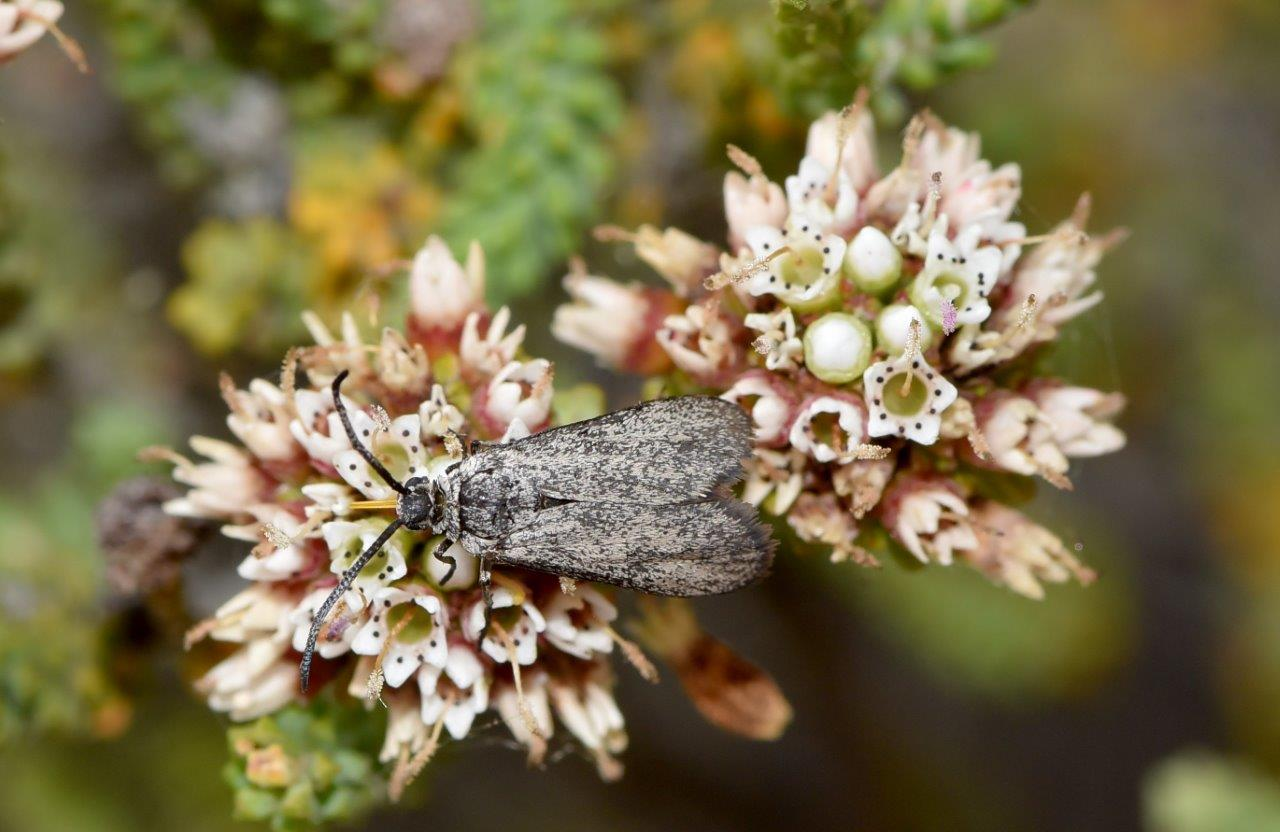
- Feeding on Darwinia sp.

Scientific classification
- Kingdom: Animalia
- Phylum: Arthropoda
- Clade: Pancrustacea
- Class: Insecta
- Order: Lepidoptera
- Family: Zygaenidae
- Genus: Myrtartona
- Species: M. rufiventris

Binomial name
- Myrtartona rufiventris (Walker, 1854)

Synonyms
- Procris rufiventris Walker, 1854; Hestiochora rufiventris; Neoprocris rufiventris

= Myrtartona rufiventris =

Species of moth

Myrtartona rufiventris is a species of moth in the family Zygaenidae. It is found in Western Australia, South Australia and Victoria.

The length of the forewings is 9–10.5 millimetres (0.35–0.41 in) for males and 7.5–8.5 millimetres (0.30–0.33 in) for females. The forewings are blackish brown with scattered whitish scales. The hindwings are elliptical, dark grey-brown, but paler proximally.

Adults have been reported exhibiting thanatosis when disturbed.

The larvae feed on Melaleuca lanceolata.
