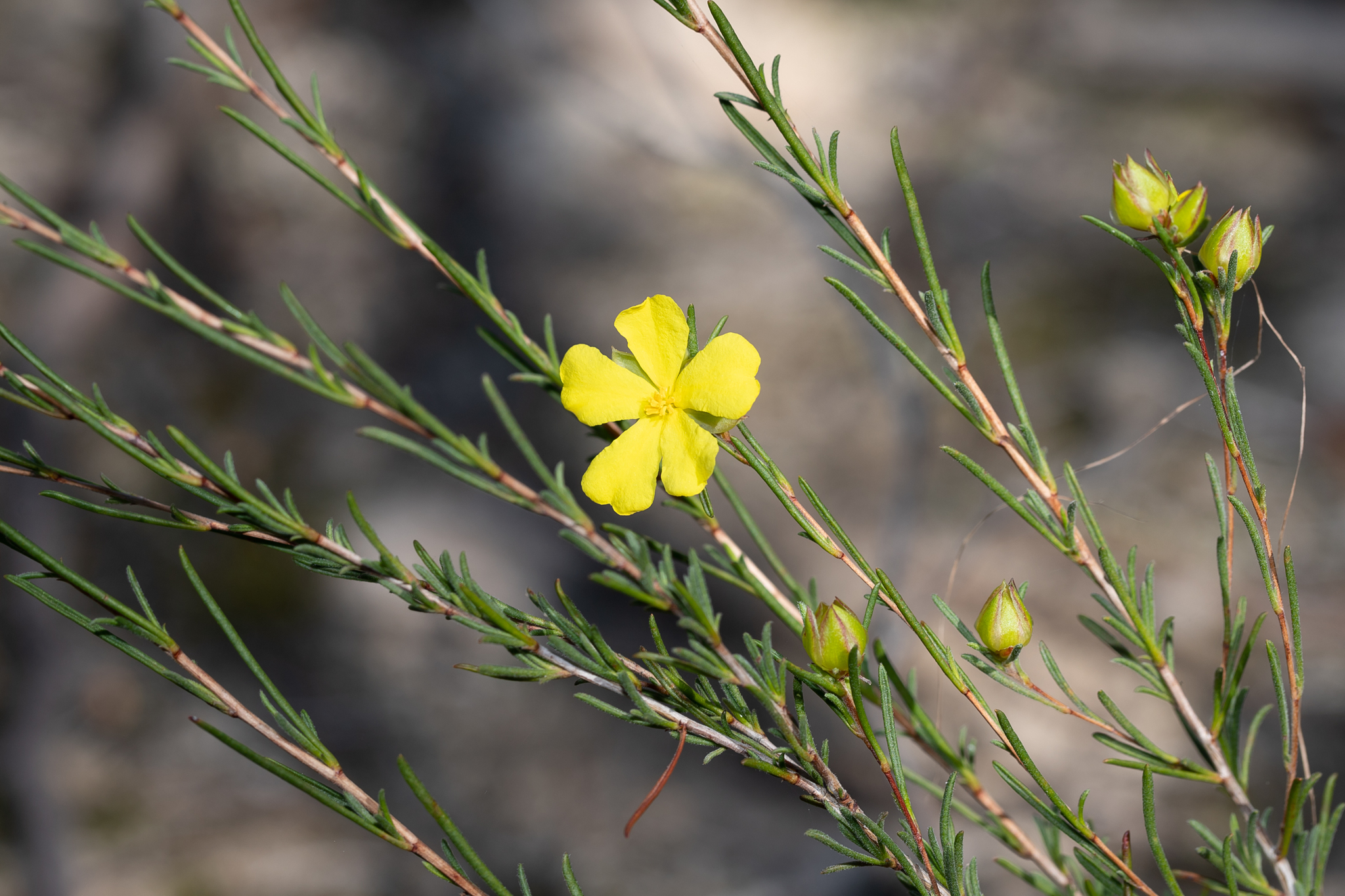
- In Ferries McDonald Conservation Park

Scientific classification
- Kingdom: Plantae
- Clade: Tracheophytes
- Clade: Angiosperms
- Clade: Eudicots
- Order: Dilleniales
- Family: Dilleniaceae
- Genus: Hibbertia
- Species: H. virgata

Binomial name
- Hibbertia virgata R.Br. ex DC.

Synonyms
- Hibbertia fasciculata var. crassifolia Benth.; Hibbertia glandulosa Schltdl.; Hibbertia virgata var. crassifolia (Benth.) J.M.Black; Hibbertia virgata var. incana J.M.Black; Hibbertia virgata R.Br. ex DC. var. virgata

= Hibbertia virgata =

Twiggy guinea flower

Species of flowering plant

Hibbertia virgata, commonly known as twiggy guinea flower, is a species of flowering plant in the family Dilleniaceae and is endemic to south-eastern Australia. It is an erect shrub with linear leaves and yellow flowers with ten to twelve stamens arranged around three glabrous carpels.

== Description ==
Hibbertia virgata is an erect, rarely low-lying shrub that typically grows to a height of up to 1.5 m (4 ft 11 in), its branches sometimes covered with woolly hairs. The leaves are linear, often cylindrical or grooved, 5–25 mm (0.20–0.98 in) long, 0.5–3.2 mm (0.020–0.126 in) wide and sometimes covered with silky hairs. The flowers are usually arranged on the ends of short side shoots and are sessile with hairy bracts 1.2–3.5 mm (0.047–0.138 in) long at the base. The sepals are oblong to egg-shaped, 5.4–9.8 mm (0.21–0.39 in) long, the petals bright yellow, egg-shaped with the narrower end towards the base, 5.8–12.2 mm (0.23–0.48 in) long. There are ten to twelve stamens arranged around three glabrous carpels. Flowering occurs from August to December.

== Taxonomy ==
Hibbertia virgata was first formally described in 1817 by Augustin Pyramus de Candolle from an unpublished description by Robert Brown. De Candolle's description was published in his Regni Vegetabilis Systema Naturale.

== Distribution and habitat ==
Twiggy guinea flower grows in heathland, woodland and mallee in New South Wales, Victoria, South Australia and Tasmania. In New South Wales in is found south from near Sydney and in south-western inland areas. It is widespread in Victoria and south-eastern South Australia but is rare in Tasmania, where it is only known from a few locations in the north and north-east of the state.
