= Pollanisus eungellae =

Scientific classification
- Kingdom: Animalia
- Phylum: Arthropoda
- Clade: Pancrustacea
- Class: Insecta
- Order: Lepidoptera
- Family: Zygaenidae
- Genus: Pollanisus
- Species: P. eungellae

Binomial name
- Pollanisus eungellae Tarmann, 2005

Species of moth

Pollanisus eungellae is a moth of the family Zygaenidae. It is only known from the type locality Eungella, an isolated rainforest area in north-eastern Queensland, Australia.

The length of the forewings is about 6 mm for males and 6.5 mm for females.
