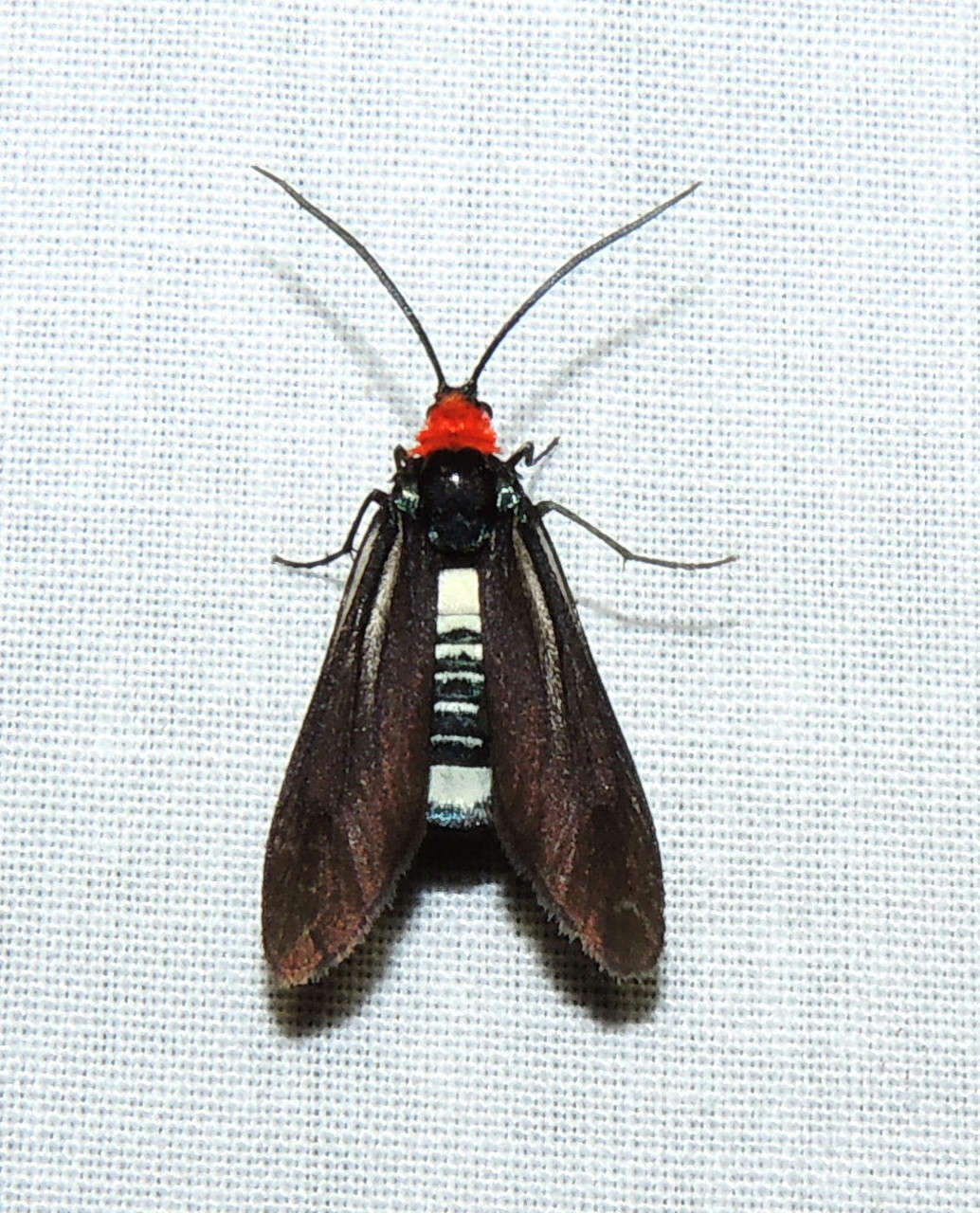

Scientific classification
- Kingdom: Animalia
- Phylum: Arthropoda
- Clade: Pancrustacea
- Class: Insecta
- Order: Lepidoptera
- Family: Zygaenidae
- Genus: Hestiochora
- Species: H. furcata

Binomial name
- Hestiochora furcata Tarmann, 2005

= Hestiochora furcata =

Species of moth

Hestiochora furcata is a moth of the family Zygaenidae. It is found in Australia from southern Queensland through New South Wales to Victoria and South Australia.

The length of the forewings is 7.5–11 mm for males and 8–12.5 mm for females. Adults are on wing from November to February, possibly in one generation per year.
