= Hestiochora xanthocoma =

Scientific classification
- Kingdom: Animalia
- Phylum: Arthropoda
- Class: Insecta
- Order: Lepidoptera
- Family: Zygaenidae
- Genus: Hestiochora
- Species: H. xanthocoma

Binomial name
- Hestiochora xanthocoma Meyrick, 1886

Species of moth

Hestiochora xanthocoma is a moth of the family Zygaenidae. It is found Australia from the tropical parts of the Northern Territory and Queensland.

The length of the forewings is 7–8 mm for males and 8–8.5 mm for females. The wingspan is about 20 mm.

It is a tropical species with possibly several generations per year.
