= Pollanisus edwardsi =

Scientific classification
- Kingdom: Animalia
- Phylum: Arthropoda
- Clade: Pancrustacea
- Class: Insecta
- Order: Lepidoptera
- Family: Zygaenidae
- Genus: Pollanisus
- Species: P. edwardsi

Binomial name
- Pollanisus edwardsi Tarmann, 2005

Species of moth

Pollanisus edwardsi is a moth of the family Zygaenidae. It is found in Australia from southern Queensland to Victoria.

The length of the forewings is 9–11 mm for males and 7–8.5 mm for females, making it the largest species in the genus Pollanisus. There is one generation per year in Victoria and New South Wales and two generations in Queensland.
