= Pollanisus contrastus =

Scientific classification
- Kingdom: Animalia
- Phylum: Arthropoda
- Clade: Pancrustacea
- Class: Insecta
- Order: Lepidoptera
- Family: Zygaenidae
- Genus: Pollanisus
- Species: P. contrastus

Binomial name
- Pollanisus contrastus Tarmann, 2005

Species of moth

Pollanisus contrastus is a moth of the family Zygaenidae. It is found in Australia in south-eastern Queensland and New South Wales.

The length of the forewings is 6–7.5 mm for males and 6.5–7.5 mm for females. There are two generations per year.
