= Pseudoamuria neglecta =

Scientific classification
- Kingdom: Animalia
- Phylum: Arthropoda
- Clade: Pancrustacea
- Class: Insecta
- Order: Lepidoptera
- Family: Zygaenidae
- Genus: Pseudoamuria
- Species: P. neglecta

Binomial name
- Pseudoamuria neglecta Tarmann, 2005

Species of moth

Pseudoamuria neglecta is a species of moth in the family Zygaenidae. It is found in Queensland, Australia.

The length of the forewings is 7 mm for females.
