= Hestiochora continentalis =

Scientific classification
- Kingdom: Animalia
- Phylum: Arthropoda
- Clade: Pancrustacea
- Class: Insecta
- Order: Lepidoptera
- Family: Zygaenidae
- Genus: Hestiochora
- Species: H. continentalis

Binomial name
- Hestiochora continentalis Tarmann, 2005

Species of moth

Hestiochora continentalis is a moth of the family Zygaenidae. It is found in Australia from southern Queensland through New South Wales to Victoria, South Australia and Western Australia.

The length of the forewings is 7.5–8.5 mm for males and 8.5–10 mm for females.

The larvae feed on Eucalyptus fasciculosa.
