= Hestiochora erythrota =

Scientific classification
- Kingdom: Animalia
- Phylum: Arthropoda
- Class: Insecta
- Order: Lepidoptera
- Family: Zygaenidae
- Genus: Hestiochora
- Species: H. erythrota

Binomial name
- Hestiochora erythrota Meyrick, 1886

Species of moth

Hestiochora erythrota is a moth of the family Zygaenidae. It is found in Australia from New South Wales and Queensland.
