= Pollanisus empyrea =

Scientific classification
- Kingdom: Animalia
- Phylum: Arthropoda
- Class: Insecta
- Order: Lepidoptera
- Family: Zygaenidae
- Genus: Pollanisus
- Species: P. empyrea

Binomial name
- Pollanisus empyrea (Meyrick, 1888)

Synonyms
- Procris empyrea Meyrick, 1888; Pollanisus empyreus; Procris amethystina Meyrick, 1888; Pollanisus amethystina; Pollanisus amethystinus

Species of moth

Pollanisus empyrea is a moth of the family Zygaenidae. It is endemic to the temperate parts of the Australian state of Western Australia.

The length of the forewings is 8–8.5 mm for males and females.

The larvae probably feed on Hibbertia species.
