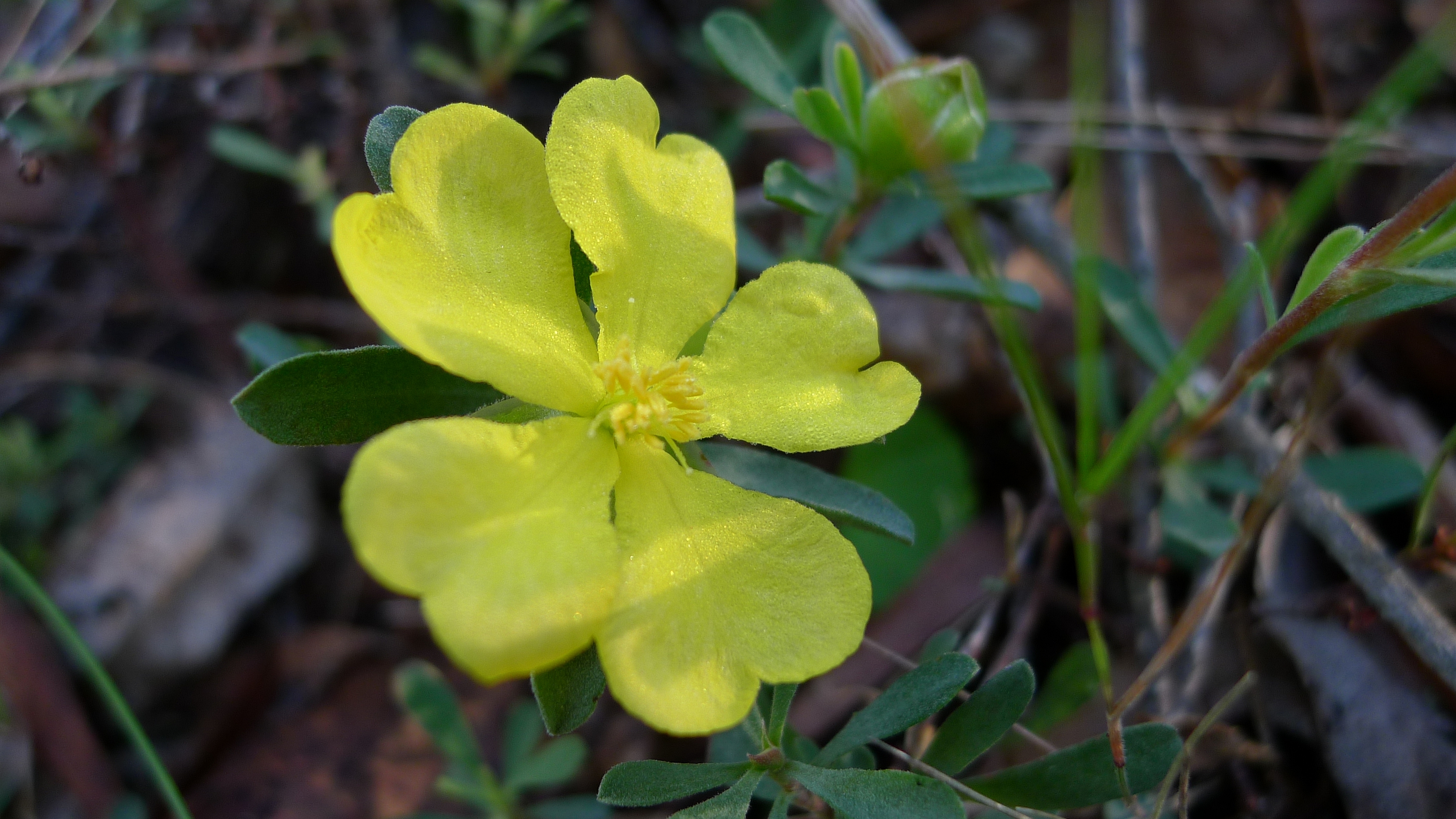
- In Morton National Park

Scientific classification
- Kingdom: Plantae
- Clade: Tracheophytes
- Clade: Angiosperms
- Clade: Eudicots
- Order: Dilleniales
- Family: Dilleniaceae
- Genus: Hibbertia
- Species: H. obtusifolia

Binomial name
- Hibbertia obtusifolia DC.

Synonyms
- Hibbertia linearis var. obtusifolia (DC.) A.Gray; Hibbertia procumbens auct. non (Labill.) DC.: Hooker, J.D. (1855)

= Hibbertia obtusifolia =

Hoary guinea flower

Species of flowering plant

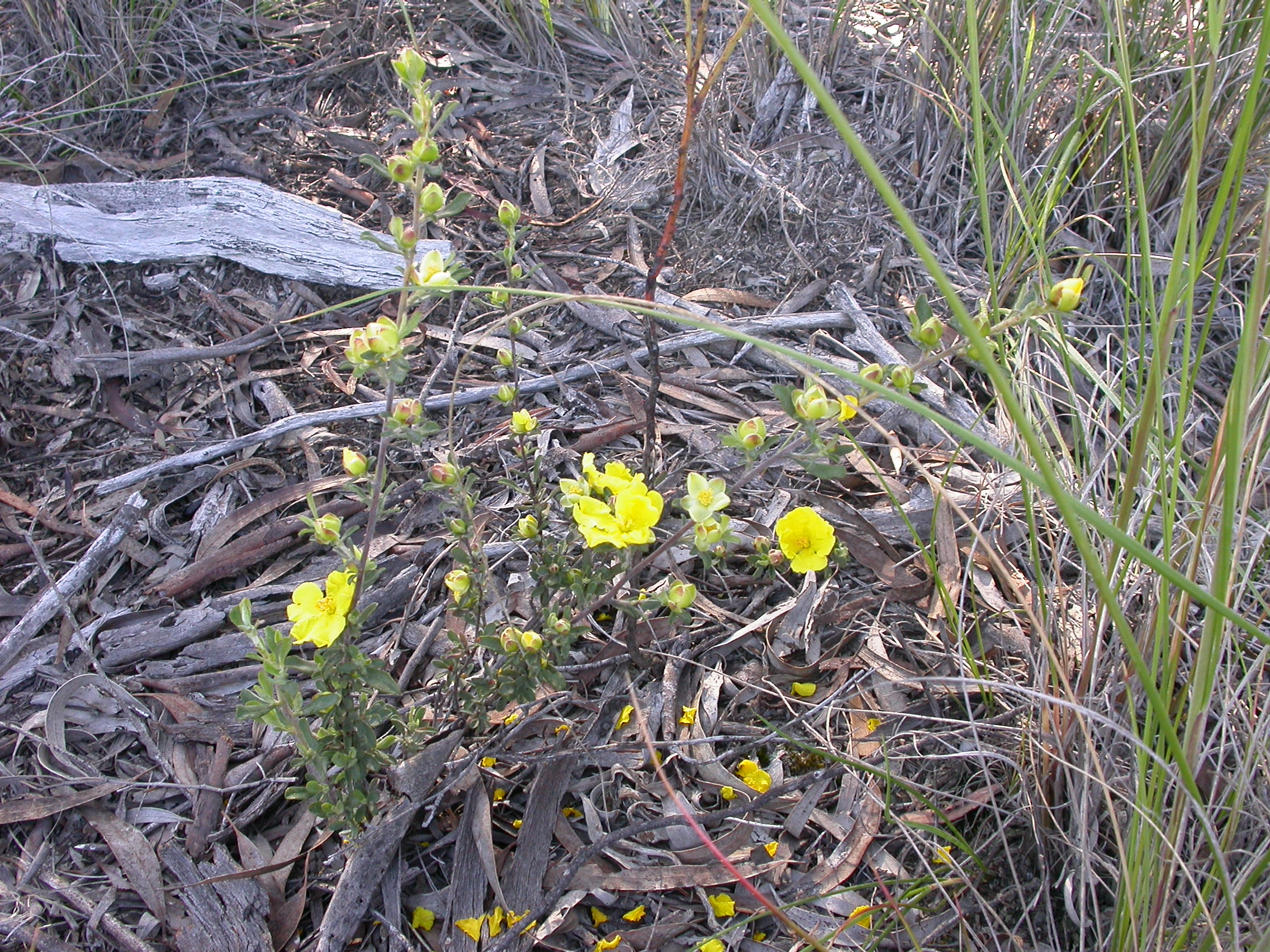
Habit on Black Mountain, Canberra

Hibbertia obtusifolia, commonly known as hoary guinea flower, is a species of flowering plant in the family Dilleniaceae and is endemic to south-eastern Australia. It is usually an erect shrub with spreading branches, lance-shaped to egg-shaped leaves with the narrower end towards the base, and yellow flowers with thirty or more stamens arranged around three glabrous carpels.

== Description ==
Hibbertia obtusifolia is an erect shrub with spreading branches up to 60 cm (24 in) long that are hairy when young. The leaves are lance-shaped to egg-shaped leaves with the narrower end towards the base, 6–45 mm (0.24–1.77 in) long and 1.5–14 mm (0.059–0.551 in) wide with a rounded or truncated end. The flowers are arranged on the ends of branches or short side shoots and are sessile with two or three bracts 2.8–3.6 mm (0.11–0.14 in) long at the base. The sepals are 4.8–8.5 mm (0.19–0.33 in) long and of unequal lengths. The petals are mid to pale yellow, egg-shaped with the narrower end towards the base, and 6.6–16 mm (0.26–0.63 in) long. There are thirty or more stamens arranged around three glabrous carpels. Flowering occurs from September to December.

== Taxonomy ==
Hibbertia obtusifolia was first formally described in 1817 by Swiss botanist Augustin Pyramus de Candolle in Regni Vegetabilis Systema Naturale from specimens collected by George Caley. The specific epithet (obtusifolia) means "blunt leaved".

== Distribution and habitat ==
Hoary guinea flower is widespread and locally common in south-east Queensland, all but the far west of New South Wales, the Australian Capital Territory and in mainly eastern Victoria, growing in forest and woodland. There is a single record from Clarke Island in Bass Strait in 1892, but recent surveys have not located the species and it is presumed extinct in that state.

== Conservation status ==
This hibbertia is presumed extinct in Tasmania under the Tasmanian Government Threatened Species Protection Act 1995.
