= Pollanisus cupreus =

Scientific classification
- Kingdom: Animalia
- Phylum: Arthropoda
- Class: Insecta
- Order: Lepidoptera
- Family: Zygaenidae
- Genus: Pollanisus
- Species: P. cupreus

Binomial name
- Pollanisus cupreus Walker, 1854

Species of moth

Pollanisus cupreus is a moth of the family Zygaenidae. It is found in the Australian state of Western Australia.

The larvae probably feed on Hibbertia hypericoides.
