= Hestiochora tricolor =

Scientific classification
- Kingdom: Animalia
- Phylum: Arthropoda
- Class: Insecta
- Order: Lepidoptera
- Family: Zygaenidae
- Genus: Hestiochora
- Species: H. tricolor

Binomial name
- Hestiochora tricolor (Walker, 1854)

Synonyms
- Procris tricolor Walker, 1854

Species of moth

Hestiochora tricolor is a moth of the family Zygaenidae. It is found in the southern half of Australia, including Tasmania.

The wingspan is about 20 mm.

The larvae feed on Myrtaceae species, including Syncarpia glomulifera and Eucalyptus species.
