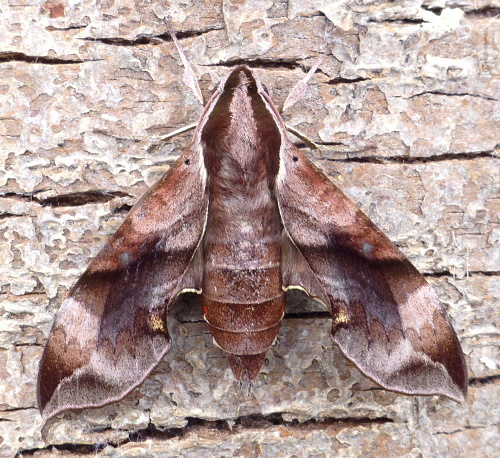

Scientific classification
- Domain: Eukaryota
- Kingdom: Animalia
- Phylum: Arthropoda
- Class: Insecta
- Order: Lepidoptera
- Family: Sphingidae
- Genus: Enpinanga
- Species: E. borneensis

Binomial name
- Enpinanga borneensis (Butler, 1879)

Synonyms
- Angonyx borneensis Butler, 1879; Daphnis labuana Rothschild, 1895

= Enpinanga borneensis =

Species of moth

Enpinanga borneensis is a moth of the family Sphingidae. It is known from Thailand, Malaysia (Peninsular, Sarawak), Indonesia (Sumatra, Java, Kalimantan) and the Philippines (Palawan).

== Description of adults ==
Adults are strongly sexually dimorphic.

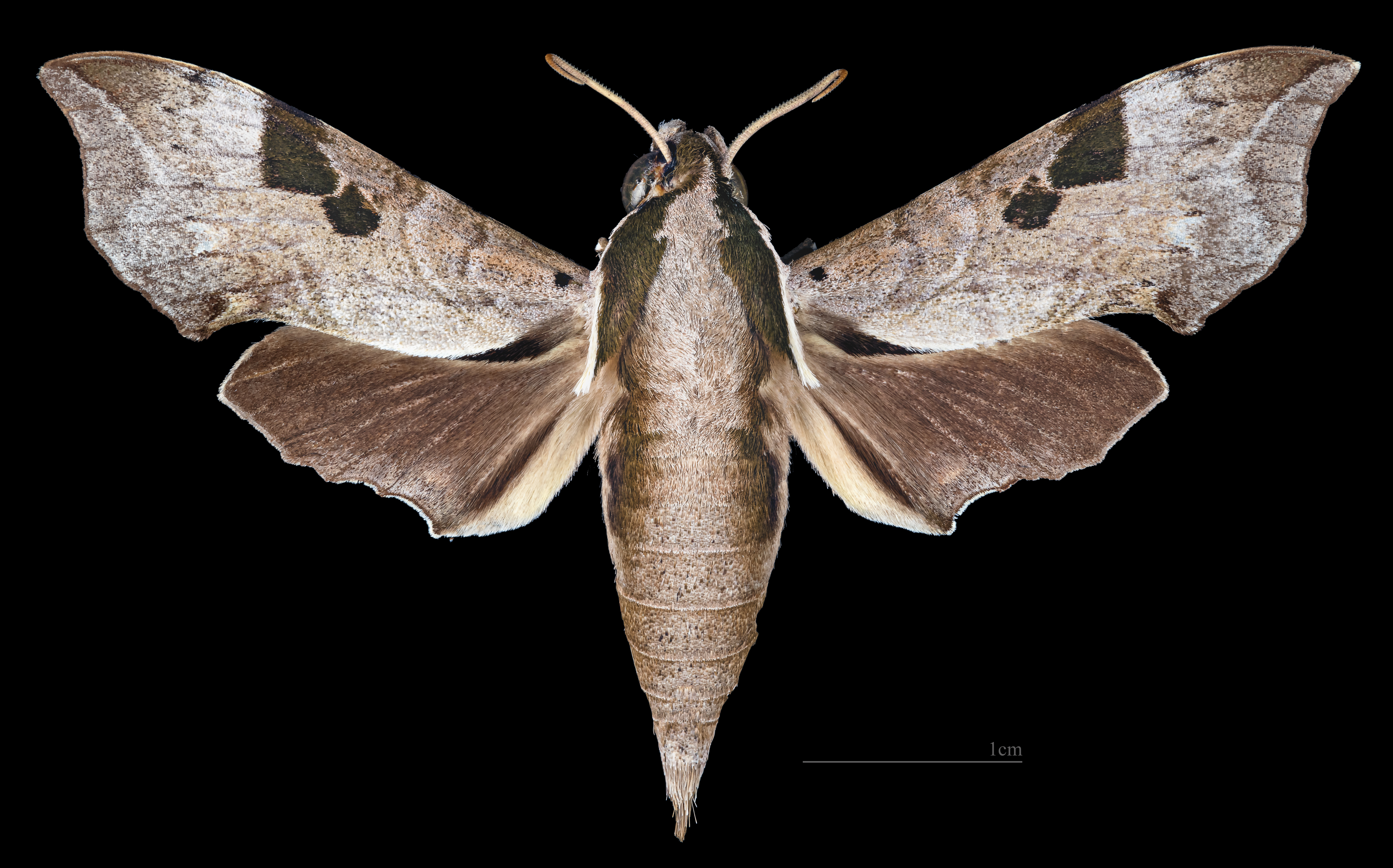
Male dorsal

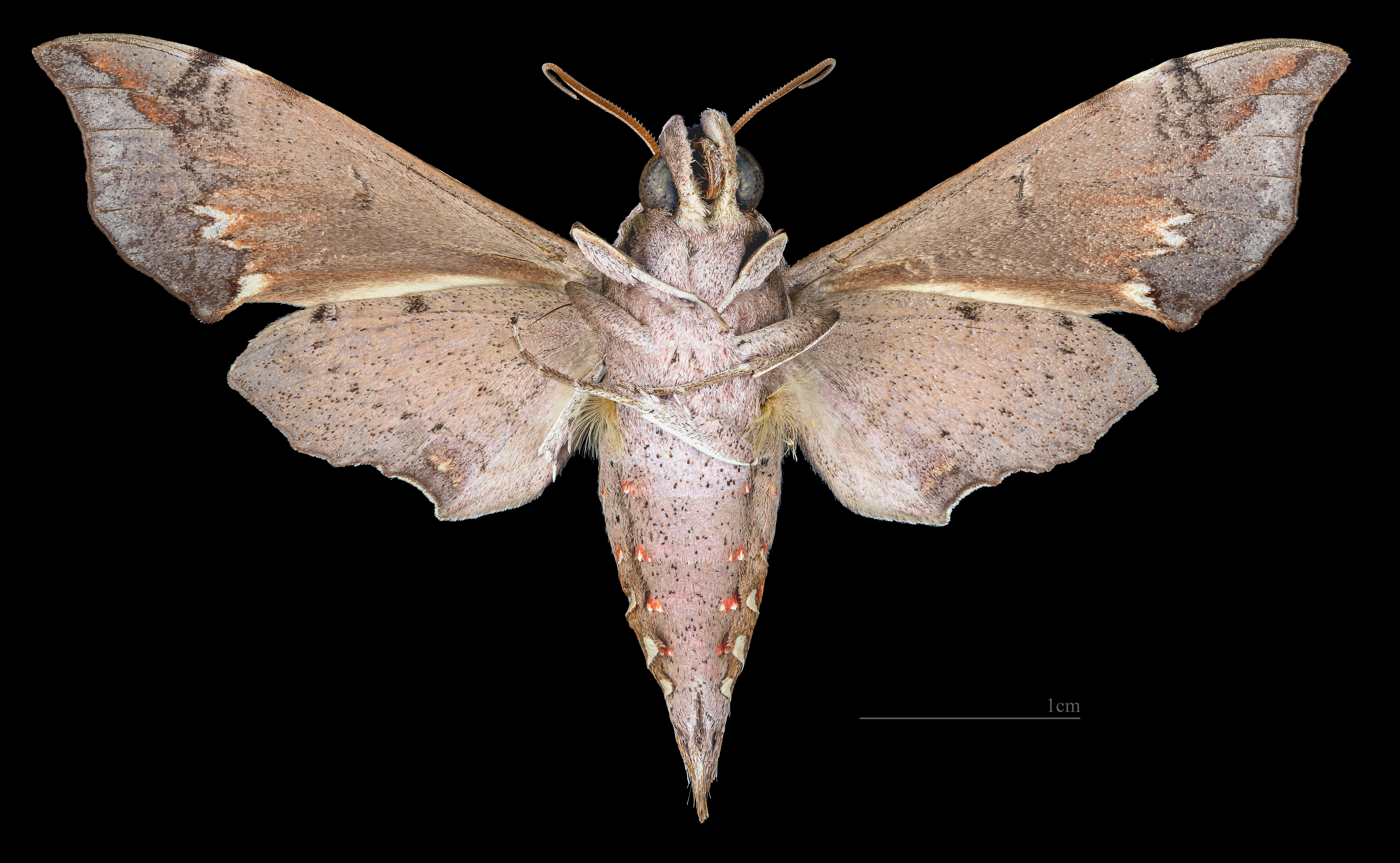
Male ventral

== Larvae ==
Larvae have been recorded feeding on Dillenia (such as Dillenia suffruticosa in Singapore) and Tetracera species.
