= Simpur =

Simpur may refer to:

- Simpur (flower), a flowering plant that is the national flower of Brunei
- Simpur, South Kalimantan, a district in South Hulu Sungai Regency, Indonesia
- Simpur, Central Java, a village in Belik district, Pemalang Regency, Indonesia
