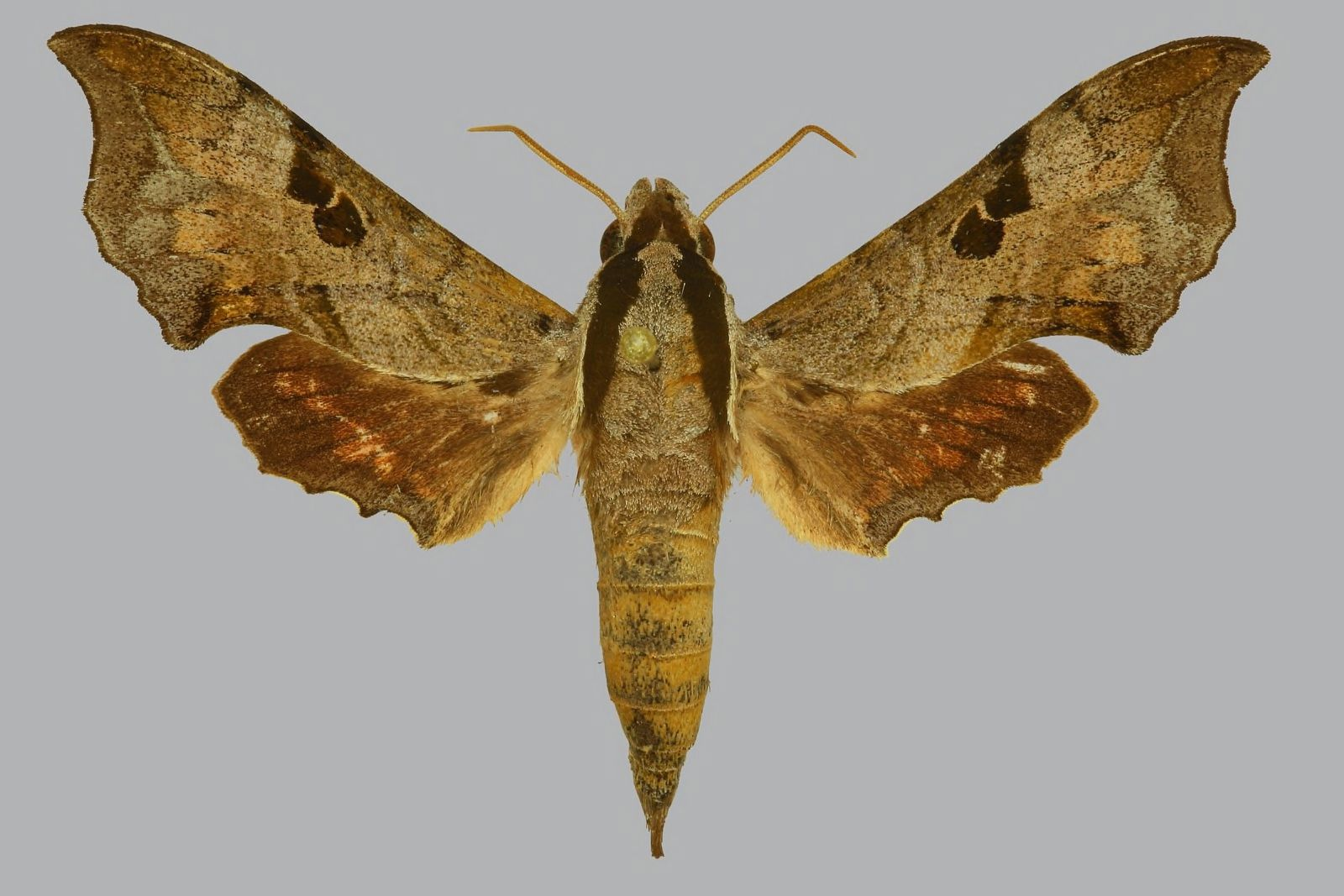

Scientific classification
- Domain: Eukaryota
- Kingdom: Animalia
- Phylum: Arthropoda
- Class: Insecta
- Order: Lepidoptera
- Family: Sphingidae
- Genus: Enpinanga
- Species: E. assamensis

Binomial name
- Enpinanga assamensis (Walker, 1856)

Synonyms
- Panacra assamensis Walker, 1856; Enpinanga oceanica Rothschild & Jordan, 1916

= Enpinanga assamensis =

Species of moth

Enpinanga assamensis, the Assam hawkmoth, is a moth of the family Sphingidae. It is known from Sri Lanka, Nepal, north-eastern India, Bangladesh, the Andaman Islands, the Nicobar Islands, Thailand, southern China and northern Vietnam.

== Description of adults ==
The wingspan is about 55 mm.
