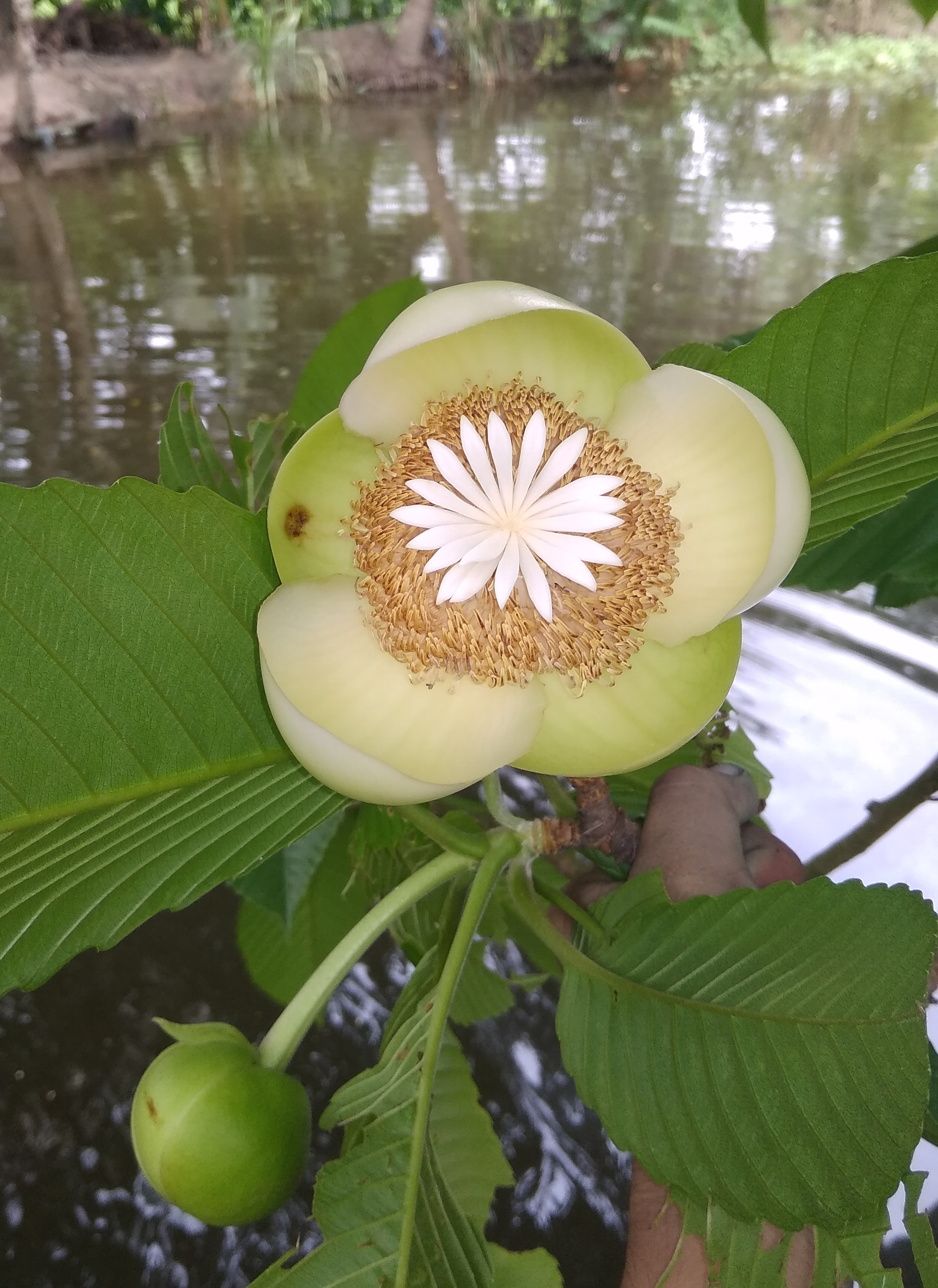

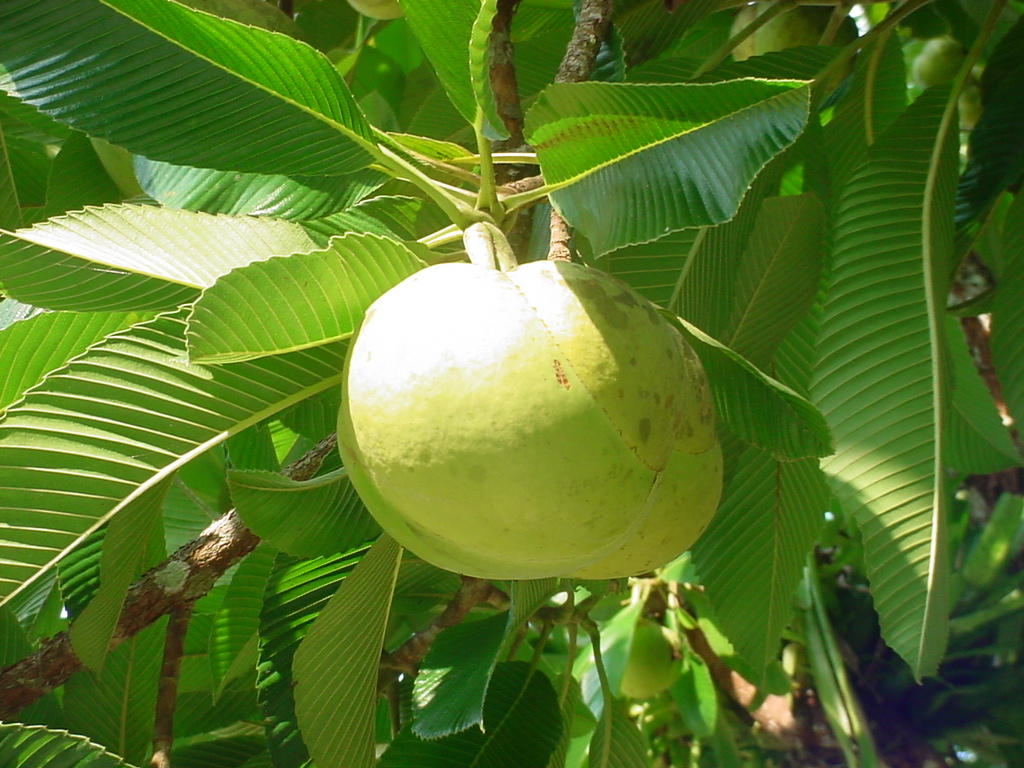
- Leaves, fruits & buds in West Bengal, India

Conservation status
- Least Concern (IUCN 3.1)

Scientific classification
- Kingdom: Plantae
- Clade: Tracheophytes
- Clade: Angiosperms
- Clade: Eudicots
- Order: Dilleniales
- Family: Dilleniaceae
- Genus: Dillenia
- Species: D. indica

Binomial name
- Dillenia indica L.

= Dillenia indica =

Species of tree

Dillenia indica, commonly known as elephant apple or ou tenga, is a species of Dillenia (Family Dilleniaceae) native to China, India, and tropical Asia. It is found in stony river banks.

This species was one of the many first described by Linnaeus in the 10th edition of his Systema Naturae in 1759.

== Description ==
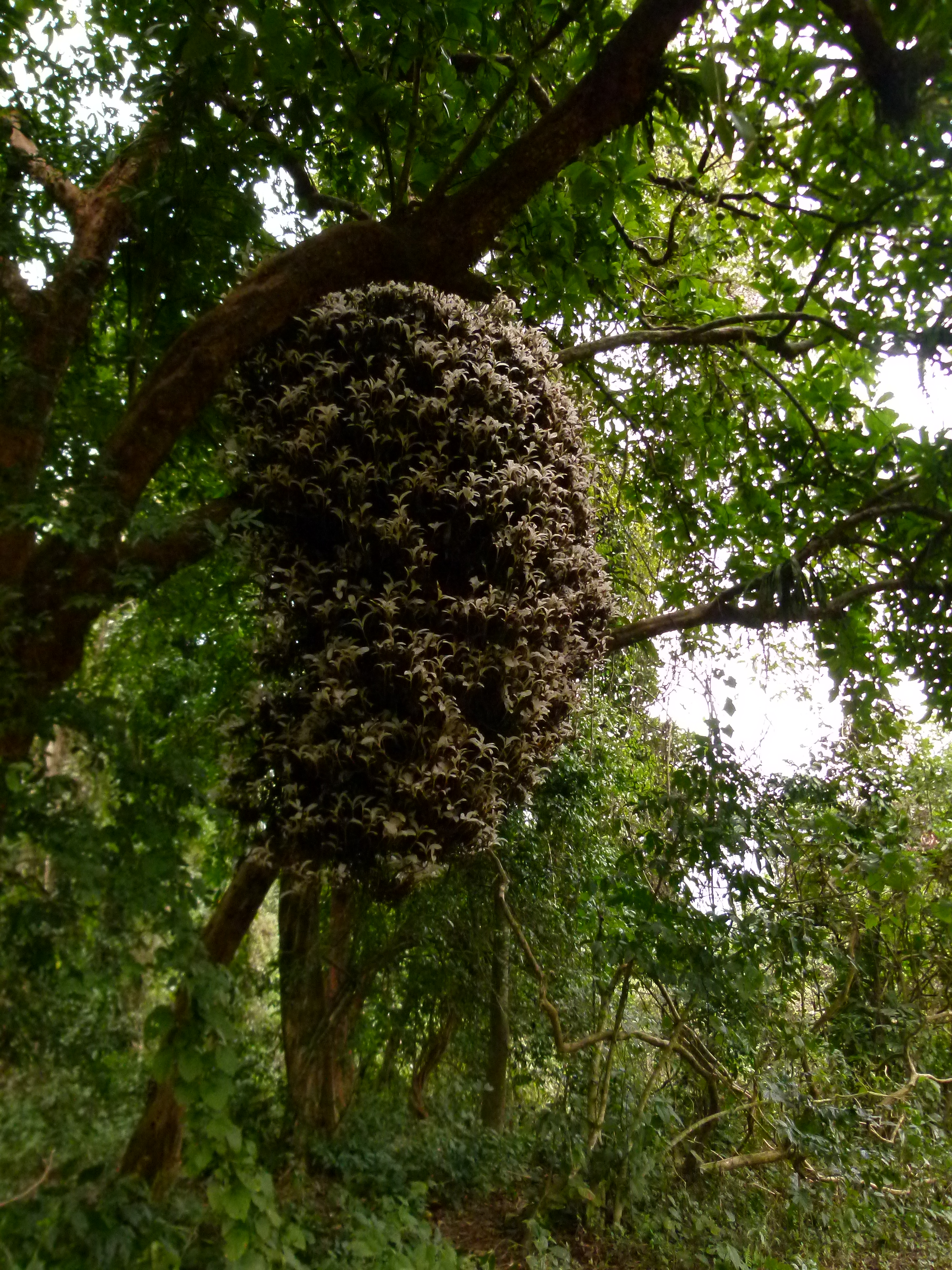
Albinistic Dillenia indica in Pakke Tiger Reserve, Arunachal Pradesh, India

It is an evergreen large shrub or small to medium-sized tree growing to 30 m tall, its trunk is crooked and irregular. The leaves are 15–36 cm long, occasionally to 75 cm (30 inches) with a conspicuously corrugated surface with impressed parallel veins.

The flowers are large, 15–20 cm diameter with five white or creamy yellow petals. They have two sets of stamens: outer straight stamens 13–15 mm long and inner bent yellow stamens 20–22 mm long.

Its fruits are large, round and greenish yellow consisting of 15 carpels together having a diameter of 5–12 cm. Each carpel has five seeds embedded in an edible but fibrous and glutinous pulp.

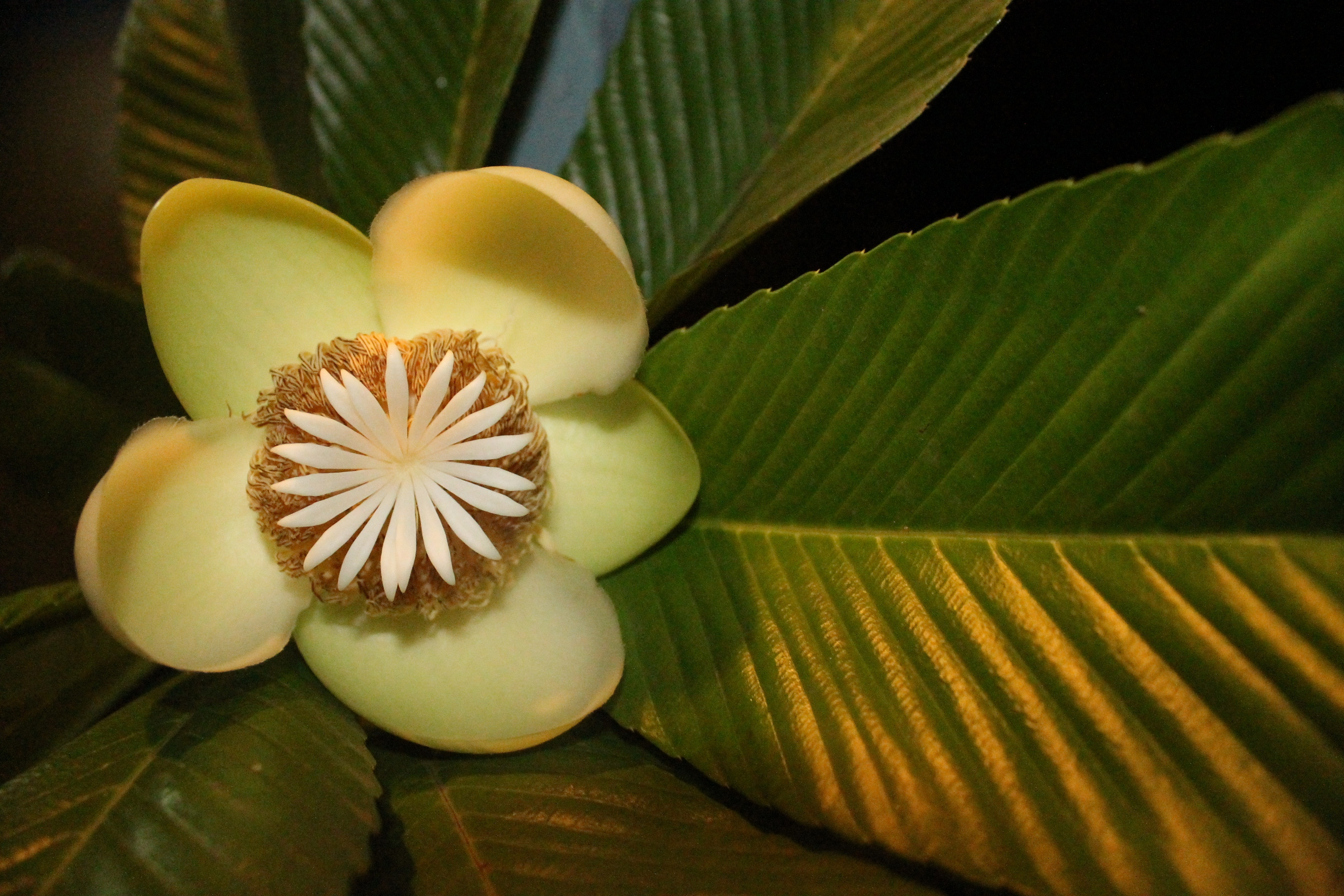
Flower of D. indica.

== Ecology ==
The name elephant apple comes from the fact that it produces a large hard edible fruit which is accessible only to the megaherbivores in the wild like elephants. A study in the Buxa Tiger Reserve by ecologists Sekar & Sukumar has shown that Asian elephants appear to have a particular fondness for the fruits of D. indica, and are hence an important seed disperser for this tree. With the prospect of extinction of the elephants this tree has developed a back-up system, whereby its hard fruits that were only accessible to megaherbivores, slowly soften on the forest floor through the dry season to allow access to successively smaller animals such as macaques, rodents and squirrels. Seeds from both old and soft fruits are able to germinate well, enabling the persistence of this tree to be independent of the survival of its major megaherbivore disperser.

== Uses ==
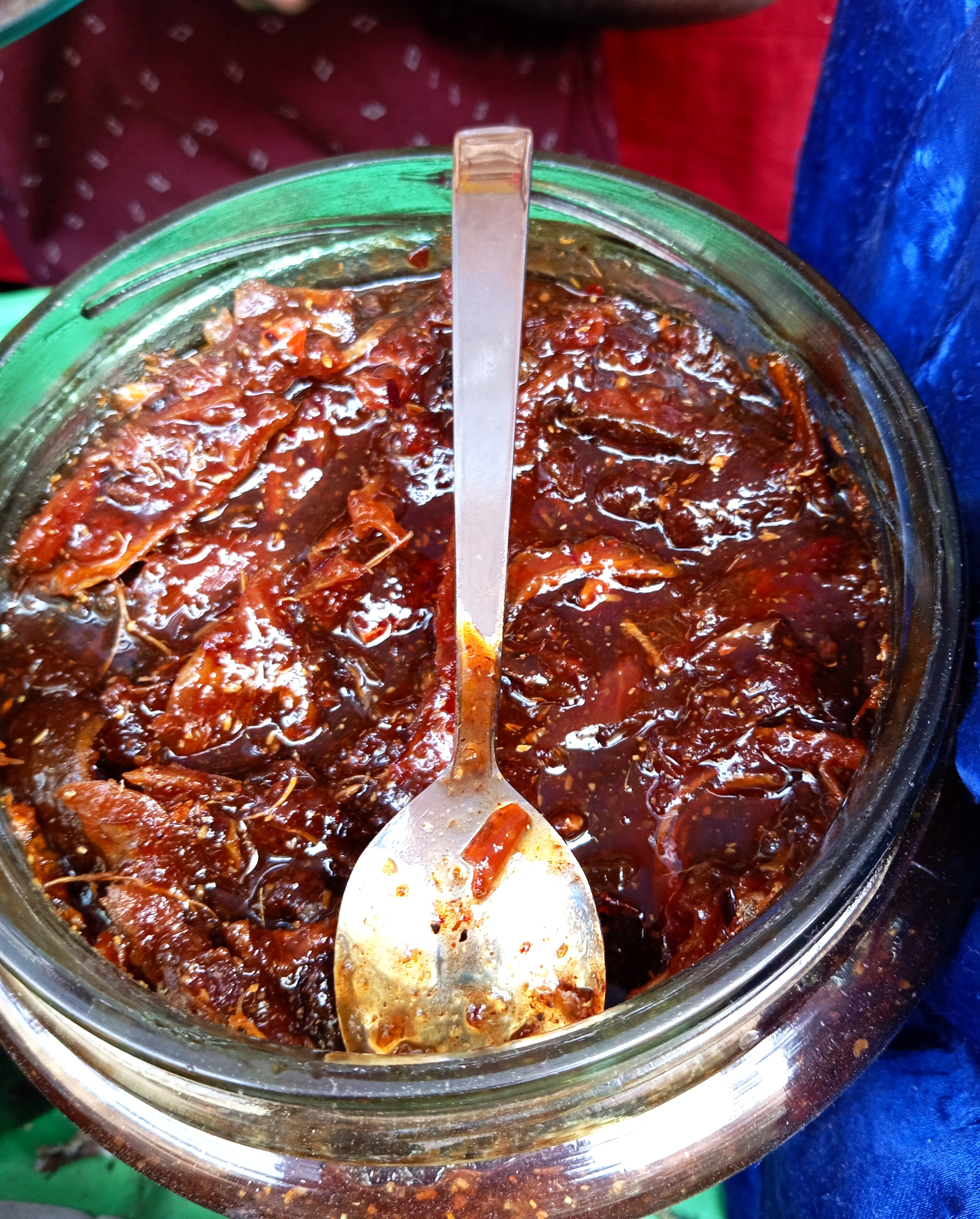
Elephant apple (Dillenia indica) pickle, Kolkata, West Bengal, India

The fruit pulp is sour and used in Indian cuisine in curries, jam (ouu khatta), and jellies.

Because it is a main source of food for elephants, monkeys and deer, collection of fruit from the core areas of the forest is prohibited. Commercial sale of the fruit is also prohibited, in an effort to help keep the food-chain system of the forest from dismantling totally.

Its branches are used to make good firewood.
