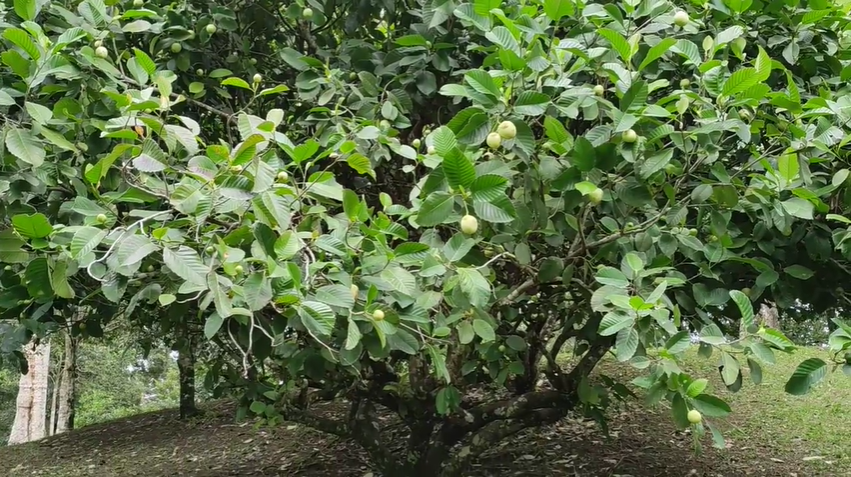

Conservation status
- Least Concern (IUCN 3.1)

Scientific classification
- Kingdom: Plantae
- Clade: Tracheophytes
- Clade: Angiosperms
- Clade: Eudicots
- Order: Dilleniales
- Family: Dilleniaceae
- Genus: Dillenia
- Species: D. serrata

Binomial name
- Dillenia serrata Thunb.

= Dillenia serrata =

Species of plant

Dillenia serrata is a plant species in the Dilleniaceae family. They are native to countries in South and South-East Asia. They commonly go by the name, elephant apple, similar to most other species in the Dillenia genus.

== Description ==
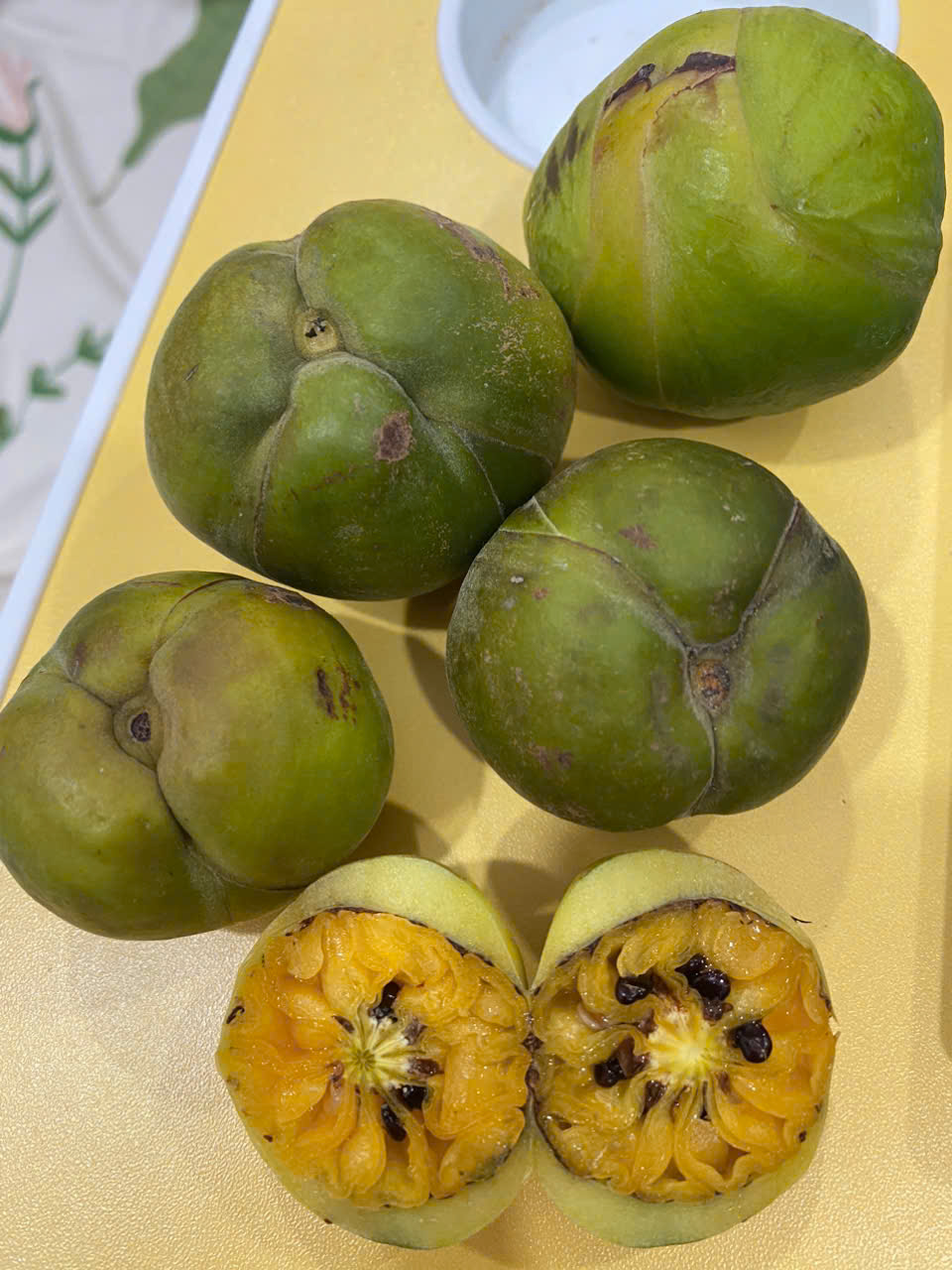
Several Dillenia serrata fruits, one being cut in half.

Dillenia serrata is an evergreen flowering tree that grows to be 30 metres (98 ft) tall. The tree has white flowers, and small green fruits that are around 10 centimetres (4 in) in size.
