= Dillenia retusa =

Scientific classification
- Kingdom: Plantae
- Clade: Tracheophytes
- Clade: Angiosperms
- Clade: Eudicots
- Order: Dilleniales
- Family: Dilleniaceae
- Genus: Dillenia
- Species: D. retusa

Binomial name
- Dillenia retusa Thunb.

Species of flowering plant

Dillenia retusa is a plant endemic to the island of Sri Lanka, there are records in the forests of Bolampatti and Anamalai hills. An ornamental, moderate sized tree, twigs and peduncles are glabrous. Leaves blunt at tip, cuneate at base, serrate, glabrous. Flowers 6–8 cm across, petals spathulate, narrow. Fruit enclosed by sepals.

== Vernacular names ==
Sinhalese:Godapara Tamil:Naiteku Telugu:Chinna Kalinga

== Ecology ==
Disturbed sites, scrub.

== Uses ==
Wood - furniture, light construction; fruit - medicinal.
