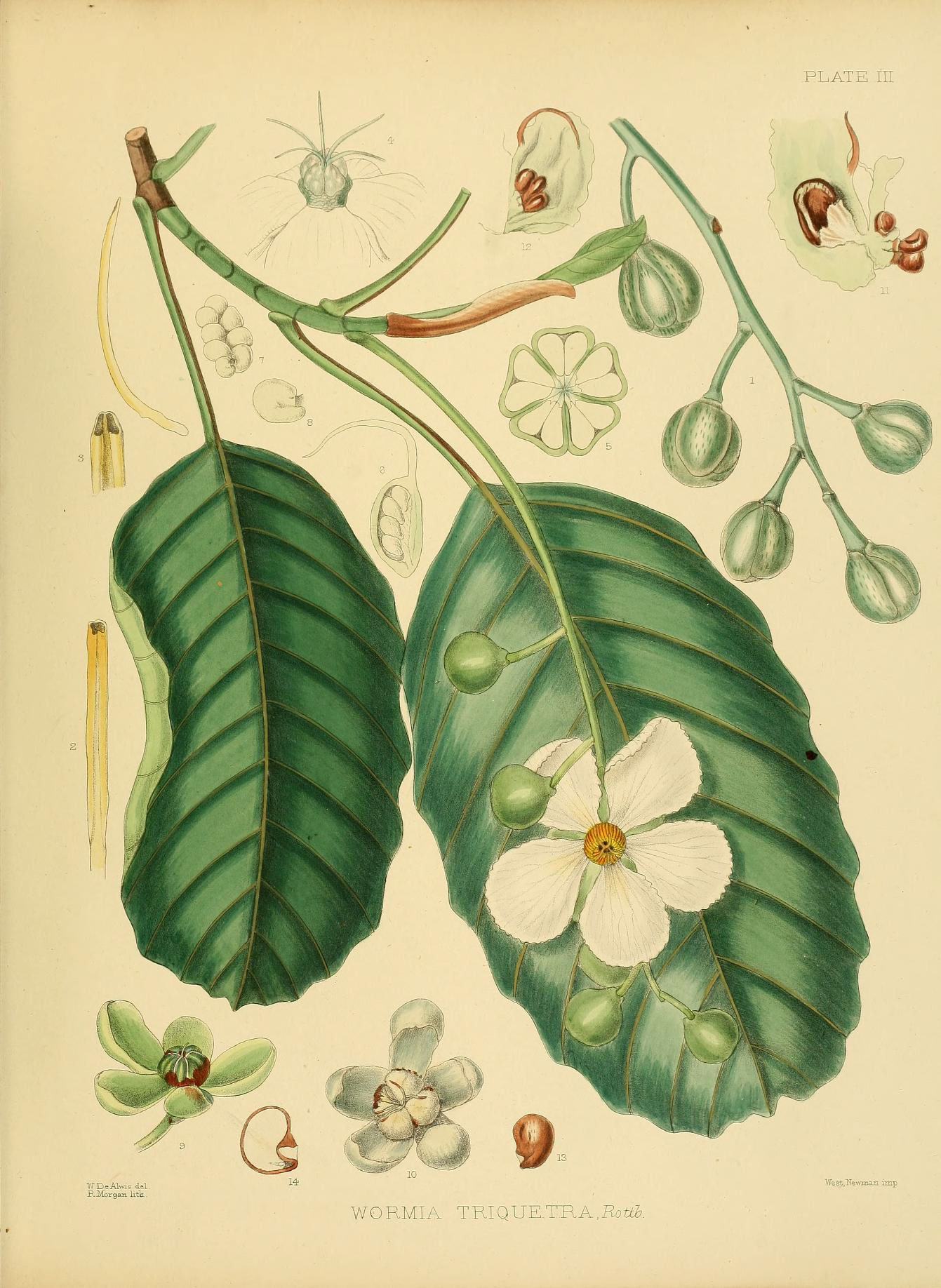

Conservation status
- Least Concern (IUCN 3.1)

Scientific classification
- Kingdom: Plantae
- Clade: Tracheophytes
- Clade: Angiosperms
- Clade: Eudicots
- Order: Dilleniales
- Family: Dilleniaceae
- Genus: Dillenia
- Species: D. triquetra

Binomial name
- Dillenia triquetra Rottb.

= Dillenia triquetra =

Species of flowering plant

Dillenia triquetra is a plant endemic to the island of Sri Lanka, where it is known as දියපර (diyapara) by local people.

== Leaves ==
Broadly oblong oval, obtuse to blunt pointed apex, margins coarsely serrated; petiole channelled above in mature leaves; prominent fleshy horseshoe-shaped cushion on upper side of petiole of young leaves.

== Trunk ==
Twigs smooth, brown, marked with large leaf scars.

== Flowers ==
White, few, large, sepals fleshy and persistent; Inflorescence - small, racemes opposite leaves.

== Fruits ==
Small, globular, enclosed by enlarged sepals.

== Ecology ==
Secondary forest, scrub, disturbed areas.

== Uses ==
Wood - furniture, light construction; fruit - medicinal.
