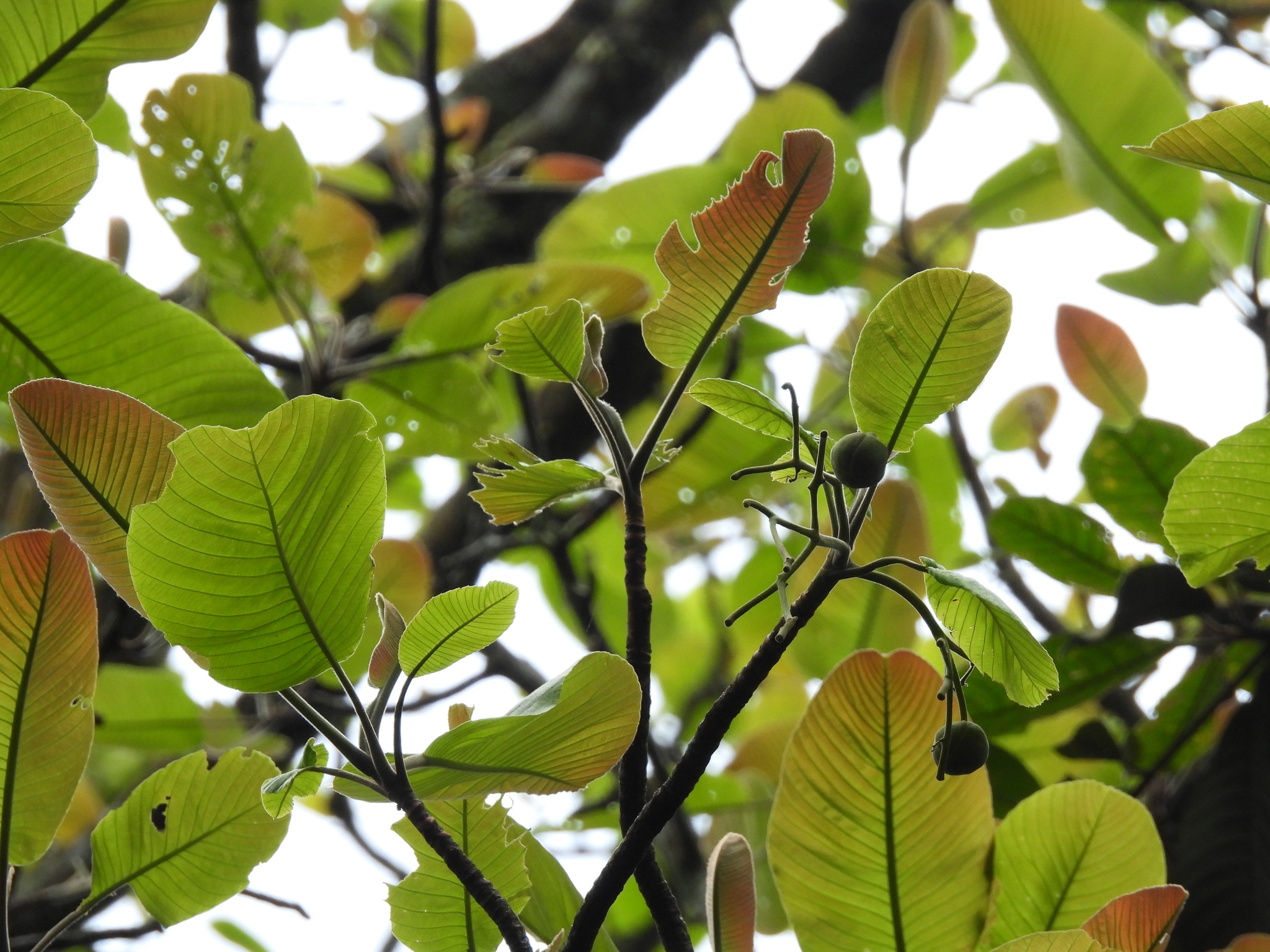
- In Selangor, Malaysia

Conservation status
- Least Concern (IUCN 3.1)

Scientific classification
- Kingdom: Plantae
- Clade: Tracheophytes
- Clade: Angiosperms
- Clade: Eudicots
- Order: Dilleniales
- Family: Dilleniaceae
- Genus: Dillenia
- Species: D. reticulata

Binomial name
- Dillenia reticulata King

= Dillenia reticulata =

Species of plant

Dillenia reticulata is a deciduous rainforest tree in the family Dilleniaceae. It is native to the Malay Peninsula, Borneo and Sumatra.

== Description ==
The species typically grows to 36 metres (118 ft) high and about 1.27 m (4.2 ft) thick, with a maximum recorded height of 63 m (207 ft). The young tree has a very different appearance, palm-like with a terminal rosette of huge, wavy-edged leaves up to 1.27 m (4.2 ft) or more in length and about 41 cm (16 in) wide. Adult leaves much smaller, to as little as 10 by 10 cm (3.9 by 3.9 in). The underside of the leaves is fuzzy. The flowers are five-petaled, yellow and about 8 cm (3.1 in) wide. The trees have prop roots similar to those of mangroves.
