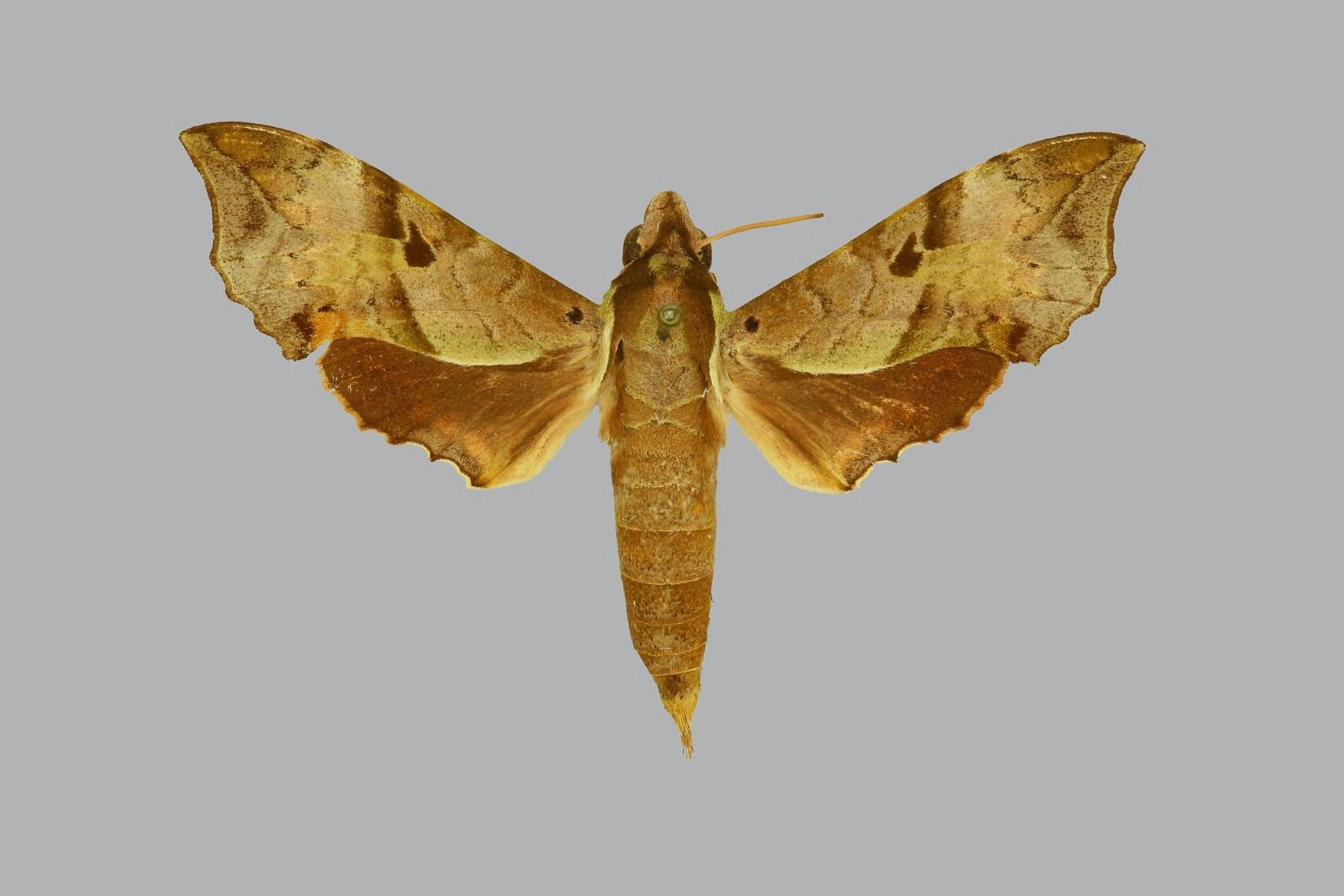

Scientific classification
- Domain: Eukaryota
- Kingdom: Animalia
- Phylum: Arthropoda
- Class: Insecta
- Order: Lepidoptera
- Family: Sphingidae
- Genus: Enpinanga
- Species: E. vigens

Binomial name
- Enpinanga vigens (Butler, 1879)

Synonyms
- Angonyx vigens Butler, 1879; Enpinanga vigens javanica Roepke, 1941; Enpinanga vigens sirani Roesler & Küppers, 1975

= Enpinanga vigens =

Species of moth

Enpinanga vigens is a moth of the family Sphingidae. It is known from southern Thailand, Malaysia (Peninsular, Sarawak), Indonesia (Sumatra, Java, Kalimantan) and the Philippines.

== Description of adults ==
Adults are strongly sexually dimorphic.
