= Dillenia scabrella =

Scientific classification
- Kingdom: Plantae
- Clade: Tracheophytes
- Clade: Angiosperms
- Clade: Eudicots
- Order: Dilleniales
- Family: Dilleniaceae
- Genus: Dillenia
- Species: D. scabrella

Binomial name
- Dillenia scabrella (D. Don) Roxb. ex Wall.

Synonyms
- Dillenia elata Pierre; Dillenia pilosa Roxb. ex Buch.-Ham.; Colbertia scabrella D. Don; Wormia scabrella (Roxb.) Spreng.

Species of tree

Dillenia scabrella is an Asian tree species in the family Dilleniaceae. This species has been recorded from: Bangladesh, Cambodia, Laos, Myanmar, Thailand and Vietnam (where they are called sổ nhám).
