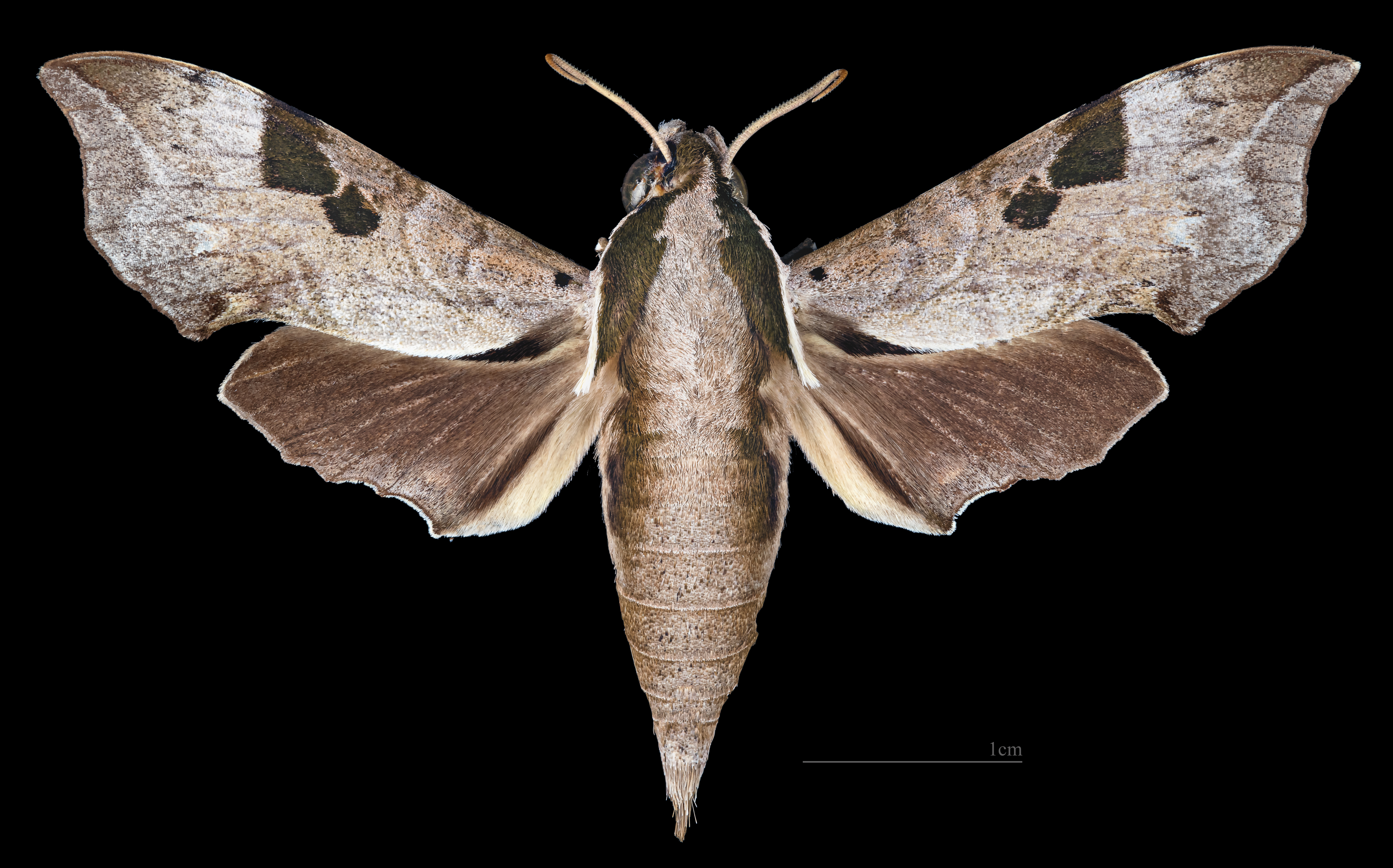

Scientific classification
- Domain: Eukaryota
- Kingdom: Animalia
- Phylum: Arthropoda
- Class: Insecta
- Order: Lepidoptera
- Family: Sphingidae
- Tribe: Macroglossini
- Genus: Enpinanga; Rothschild & Jordan, 1903

= Enpinanga =

Genus of moths

Enpinanga is a genus of moths in the family Sphingidae first described by Walter Rothschild and Karl Jordan in 1903.

== Species ==
- Enpinanga assamensis (Walker 1856)
- Enpinanga borneensis (Butler 1879)
- Enpinanga vigens (Butler 1879)
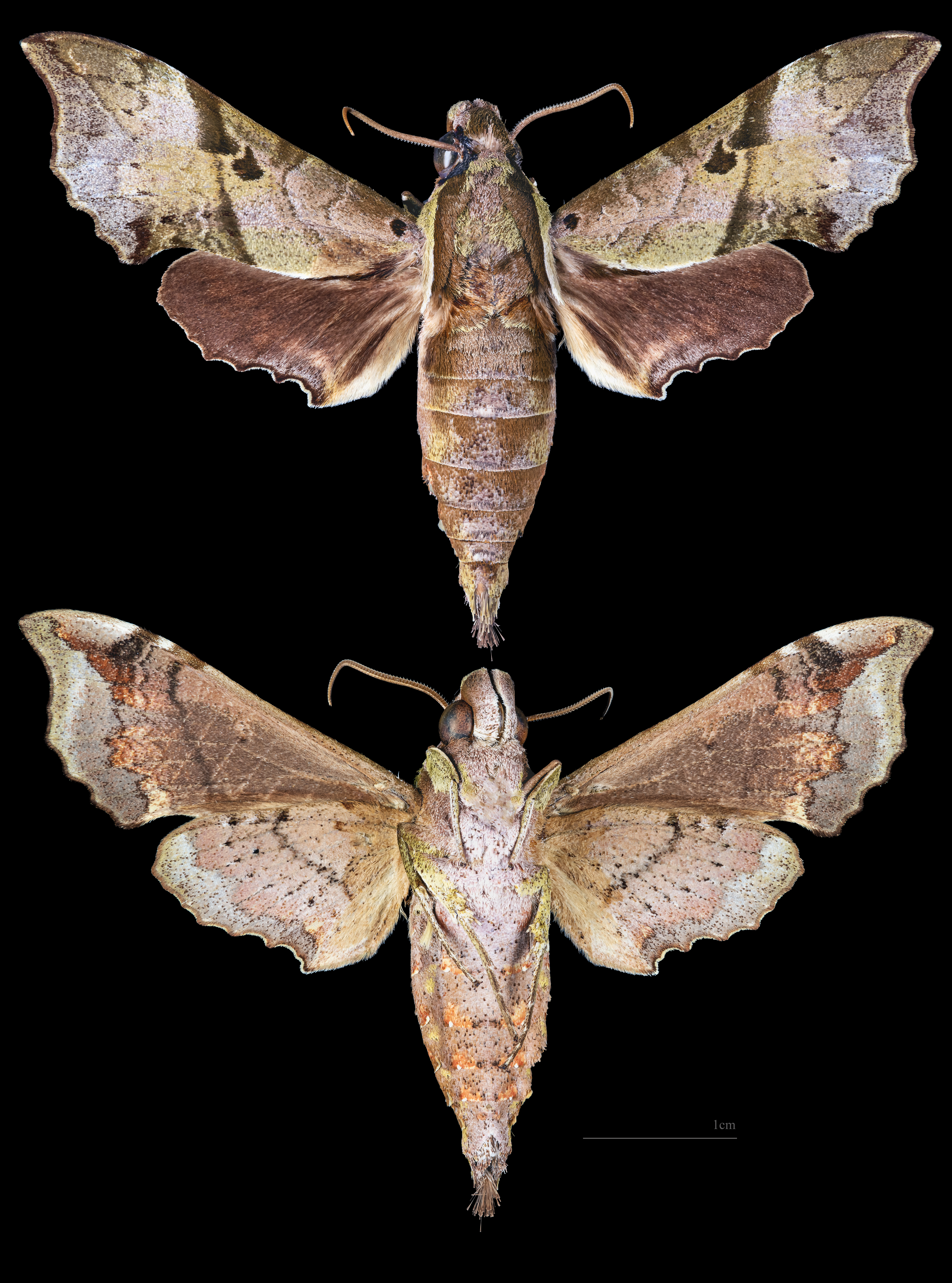
Enpinanga assamensis

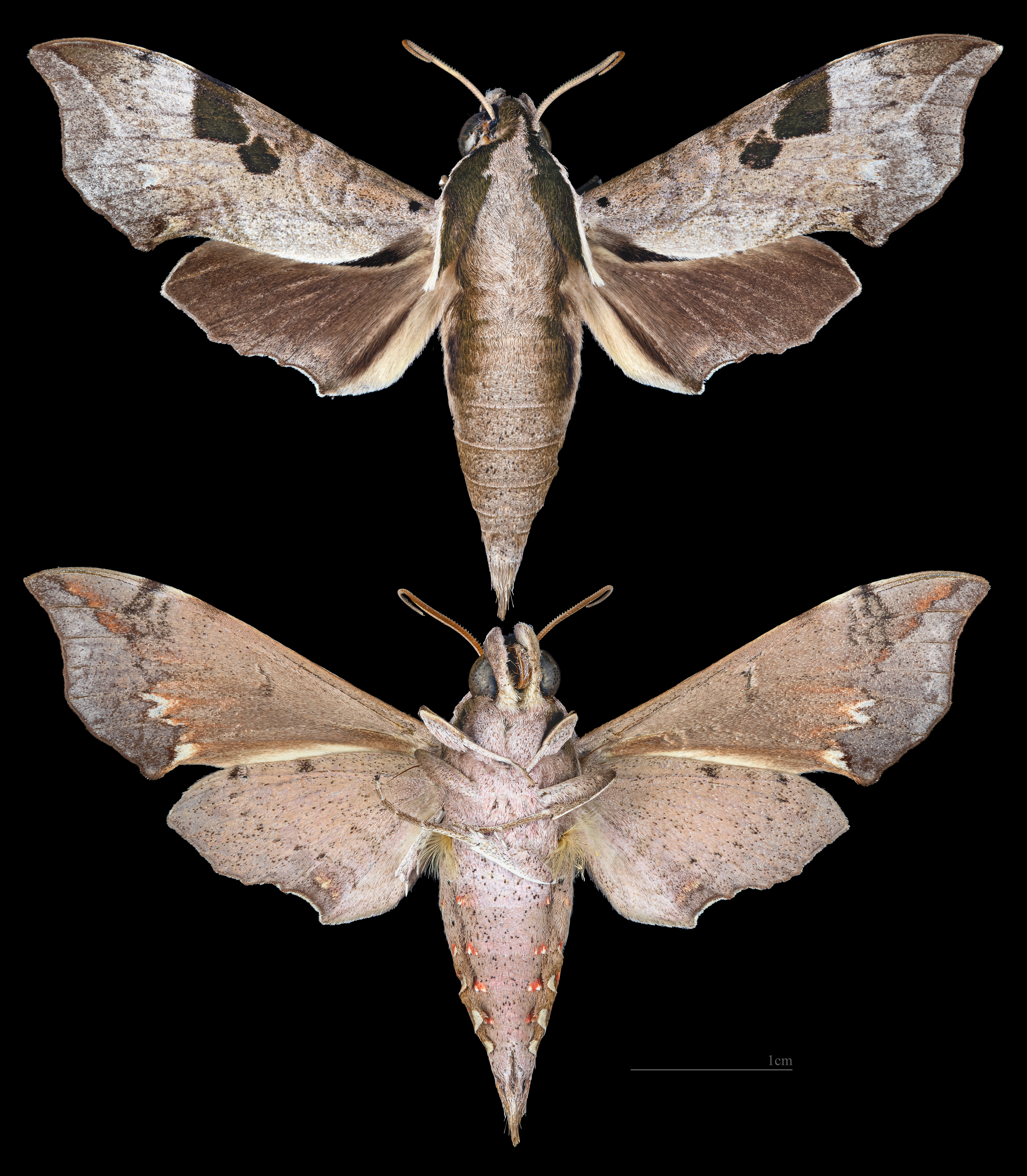
Enpinanga borneensis
