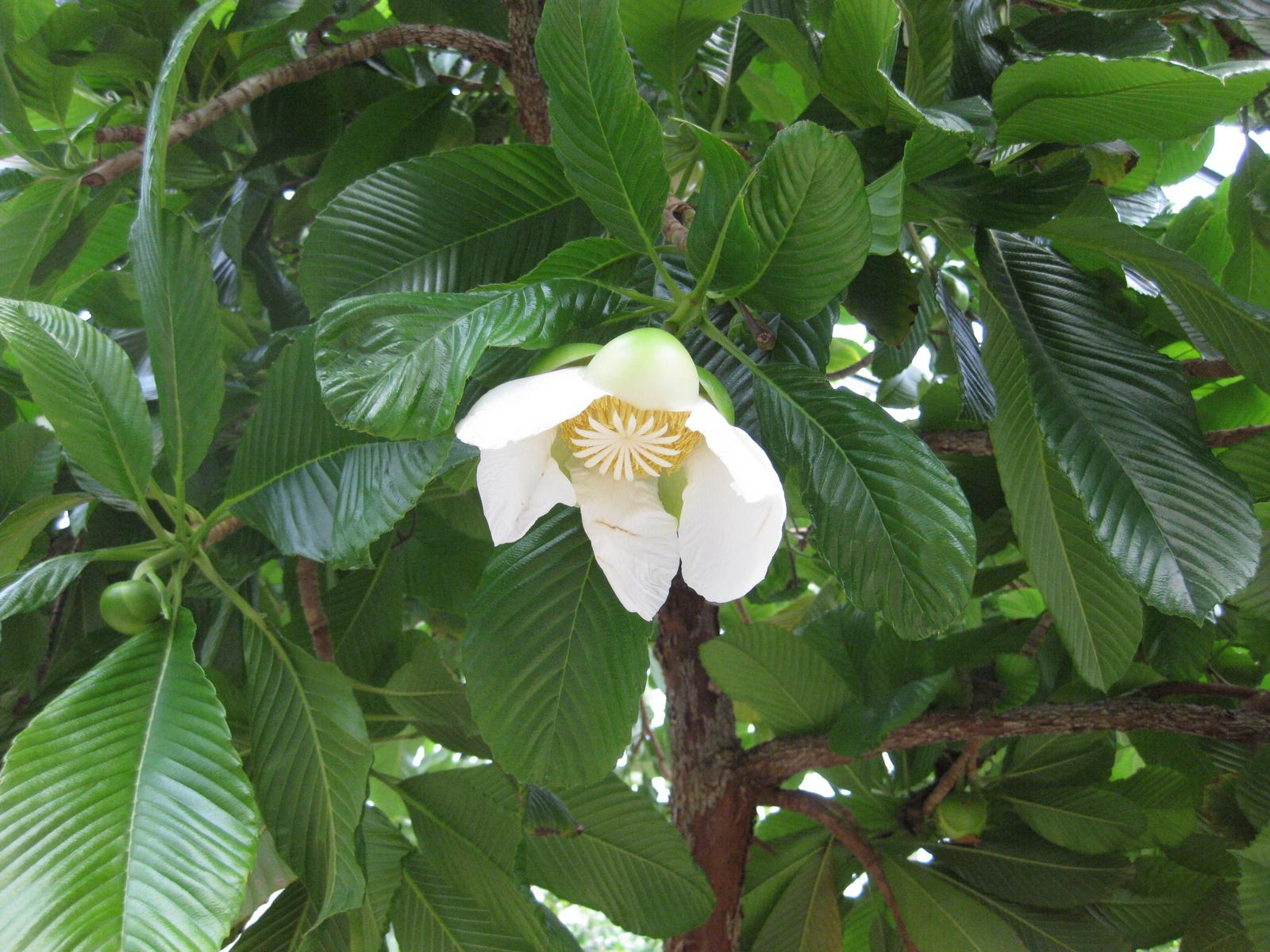
- Dillenia indica (type species)

Scientific classification
- Kingdom: Plantae
- Clade: Tracheophytes
- Clade: Angiosperms
- Clade: Eudicots
- Order: Dilleniales
- Family: Dilleniaceae
- Genus: Dillenia; L.

Type species
- Dillenia indica L.

Species
- See text

Synonyms
- Capellia Blume; Clugnia Comm. ex DC.; Colbertia Salisb.; Dilema Griff.; Lenidia Thouars; Neowormia Hutch. & Summerh.; Reifferscheidia C.Presl; Syalita Adans.; Wormia Rottb.

= Dillenia =

Genus of flowering plants

Dillenia is a genus of evergreen or semi-evergreen trees and shrubs in the flowering plant family Dilleniaceae, native to tropical and subtropical regions of southern Asia, Australasia, and the Indian Ocean islands.

The genus is named after the German botanist Johann Jacob Dillenius.

== Structure ==
The leaves are simple and spirally arranged. They are generally large, in the case of Dillenia reticulata reaching 1.27 m (4 ft 2 in) in length and about 41 cm (16 in) wide. The flowers are solitary, or in terminal racemes, with five sepals and five petals, numerous stamens (up to 900 in the case of Dillenia ovalifolia), and a cluster of five to 20 carpels. Some species, such as Dillenia indica and Dillenia megalantha can have flower diameters of 20 cm (7.9 in). They are superficially similar in appearance to Magnolia flowers.

== Image gallery ==
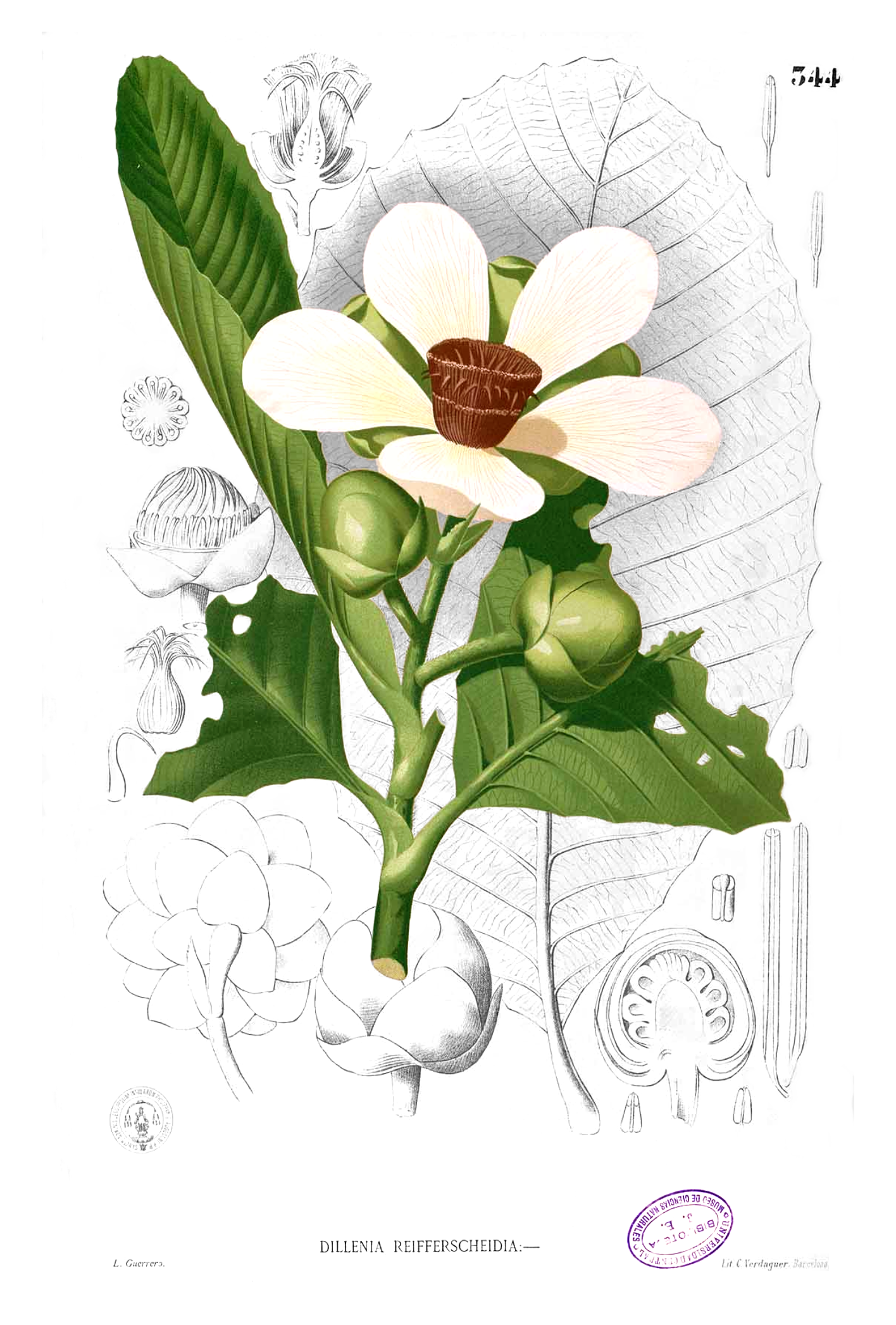

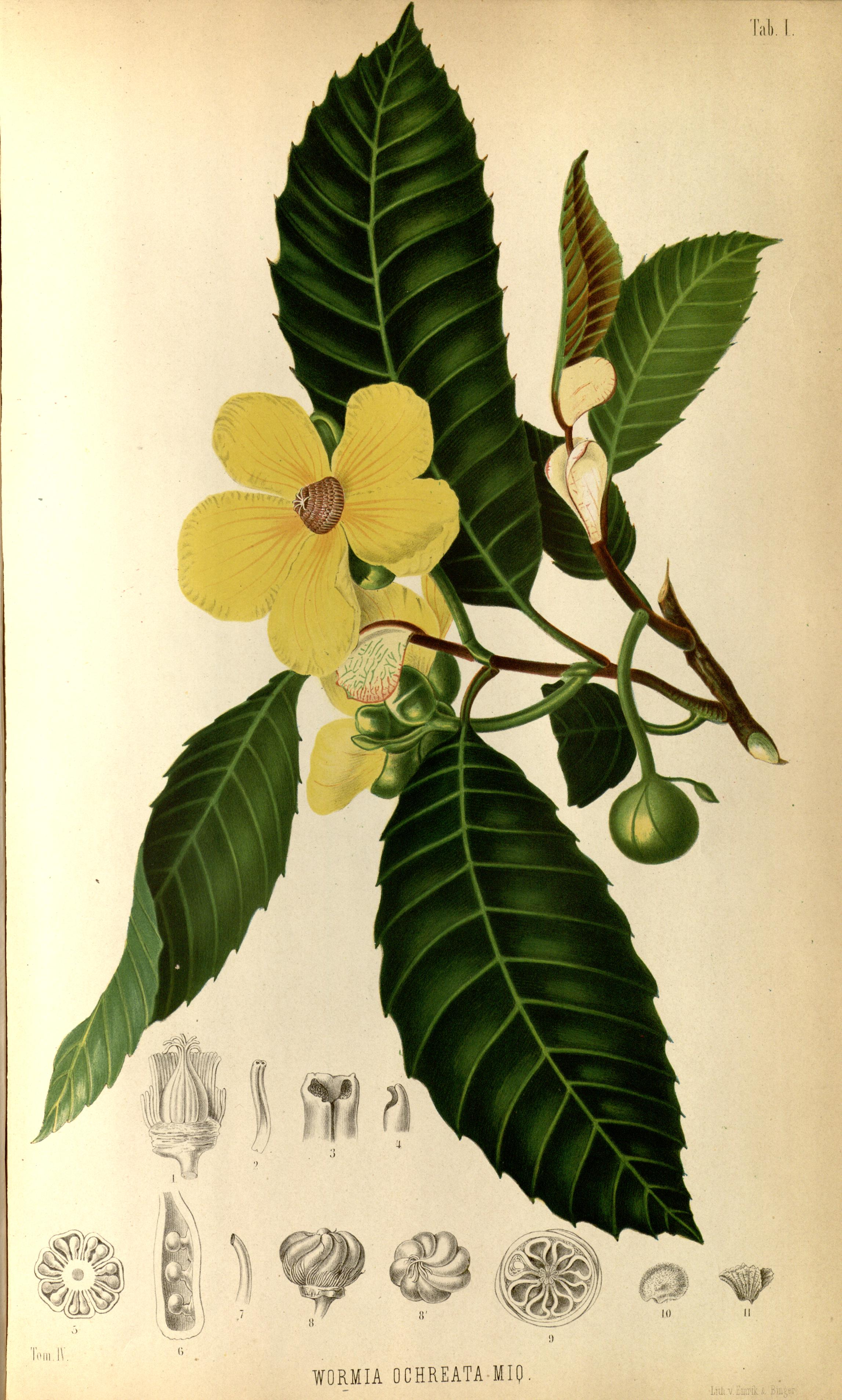

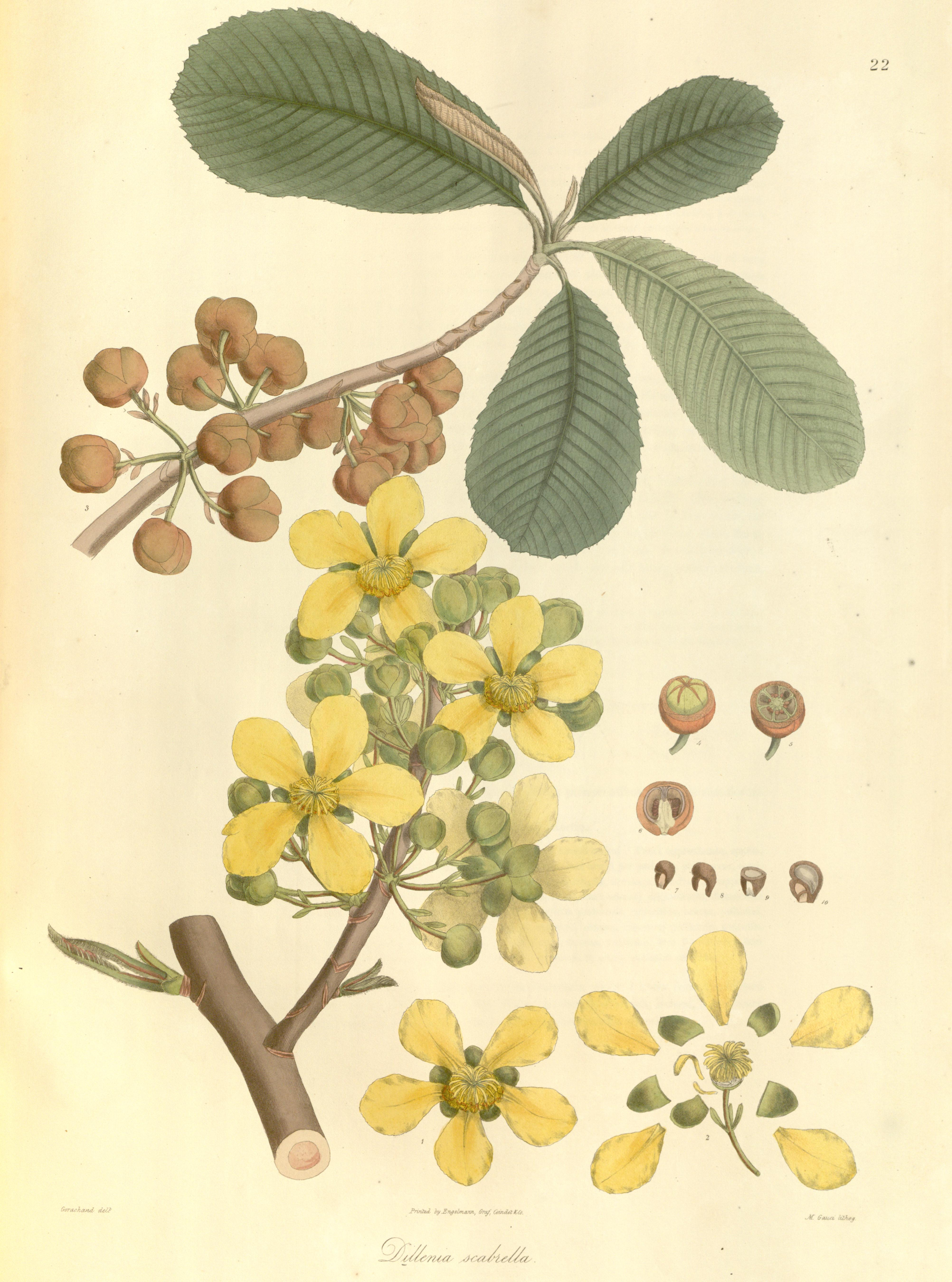

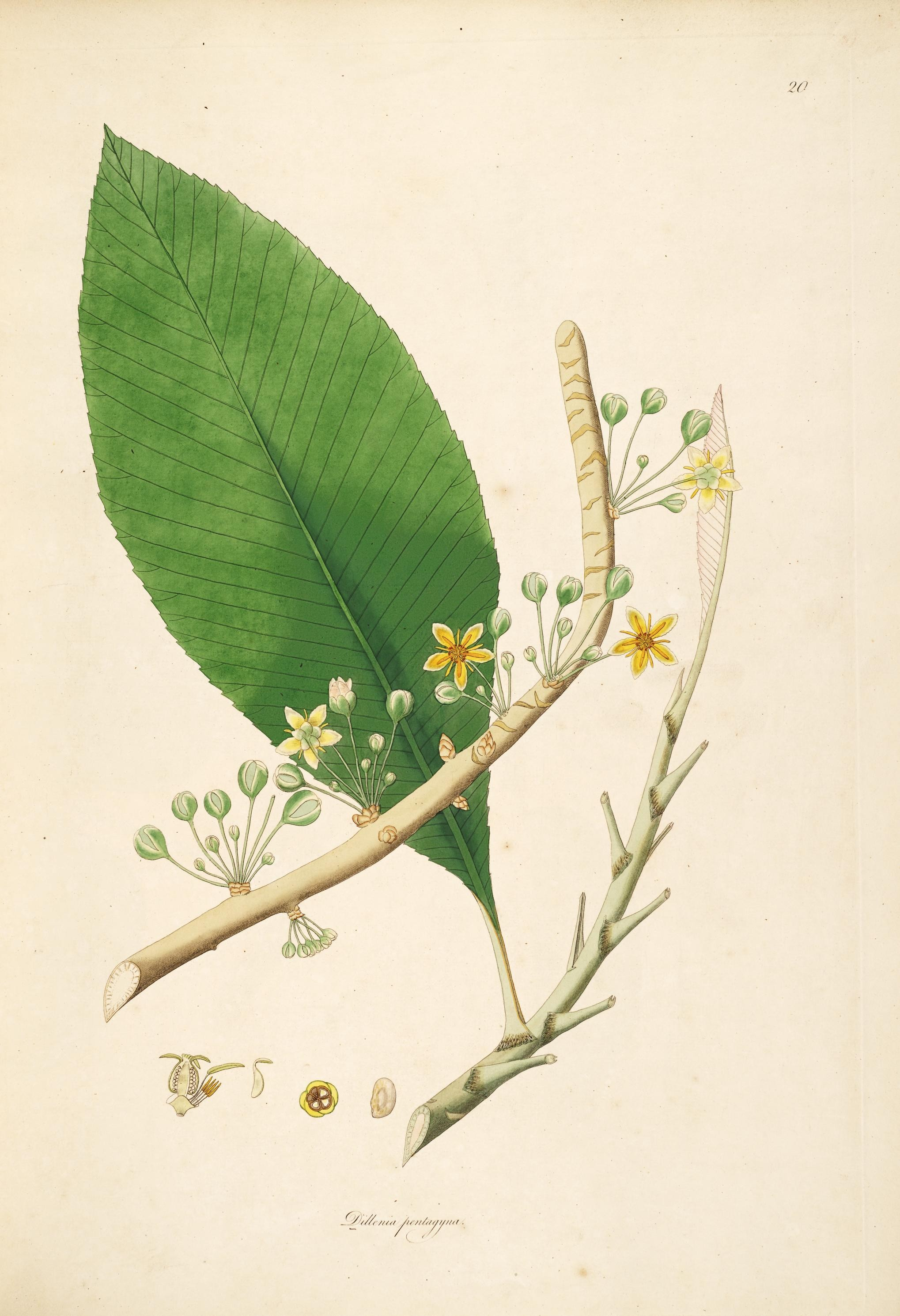

== Species ==
As of September 2024, Plants of the World Online recognises the following 60 species:

- Dillenia alata (R.Br. ex DC.) Banks ex Martelli
- Dillenia albiflos (Ridl.) Hoogland
- Dillenia andamanica C.E.Parkinson
- Dillenia aurea Sm.
- Dillenia auriculata Martelli
- Dillenia beccariana Martelli
- Dillenia biflora (A.Gray) Guillaumin
- Dillenia blanchardii Pierre
- Dillenia bolsteri Merr.
- Dillenia borneensis Hoogland
- Dillenia bracteata Wight
- Dillenia castaneifolia (Miq.) Martelli ex T.Durand & B.D.Jacks.
- Dillenia celebica Hoogland
- Dillenia crenatifolia Hoogland ex Mabb.
- Dillenia cyclopensis Hoogland
- Dillenia diantha Hoogland
- Dillenia excelsa (Jack) Gilg
- Dillenia fagifolia Hoogland
- Dillenia ferruginea (Baill.) Gilg
- Dillenia fischeri Merr.
- Dillenia grandifolia Wall. ex Hook.f. & Thomson
- Dillenia hookeri Pierre
- Dillenia indica L.
- Dillenia ingens B.L.Burtt
- Dillenia insignis (A.C.Sm.) Hoogland
- Dillenia insularum Hoogland
- Dillenia luzoniensis Merr.
- Dillenia mansonii (Gage) Hoogland
- Dillenia marsupialis Hoogland
- Dillenia megalantha Merr.
- Dillenia monantha Merr.
- Dillenia montana Diels
- Dillenia nalagi Hoogland
- Dillenia obovata (Blume) Hoogland
- Dillenia ochreata (Miq.) Teijsm. & Binn. ex Martelli
- Dillenia ovalifolia Hoogland
- Dillenia ovata Wall. ex Hook.f. & Thomson
- Dillenia papuana Martelli
- Dillenia parkinsonii Hoogland
- Dillenia parviflora Griff.
- Dillenia pentagyna Roxb.
- Dillenia philippinensis Rolfe
- Dillenia pteropoda (Miq.) Hoogland
- Dillenia pulchella (Jack) Gilg
- Dillenia quercifolia (C.T.White & W.D.Francis ex Lane-Poole) Hoogland
- Dillenia reifferscheidia Fern.-Vill.
- Dillenia reticulata King
- Dillenia retusa Thunb.
- Dillenia salomonensis (C.T.White) Hoogland
- Dillenia scabrella (D.Don) Roxb. ex Wall.
- Dillenia schlechteri Diels
- Dillenia serrata Thunb.
- Dillenia sibuyanensis (Elmer) Merr.
- Dillenia suffruticosa (Griff. ex Hook.f. & Thomson) Martelli
- Dillenia sumatrana Miq.
- Dillenia talaudensis Hoogland
- Dillenia tetrapetala Joongku Lee, T.B.Tran & R.K.Choudhary
- Dillenia tirupatiensis J.Swamy & Rasingam
- Dillenia triquetra (Rottb.) Gilg
- Dillenia turbinata Finet & Gagnep.
