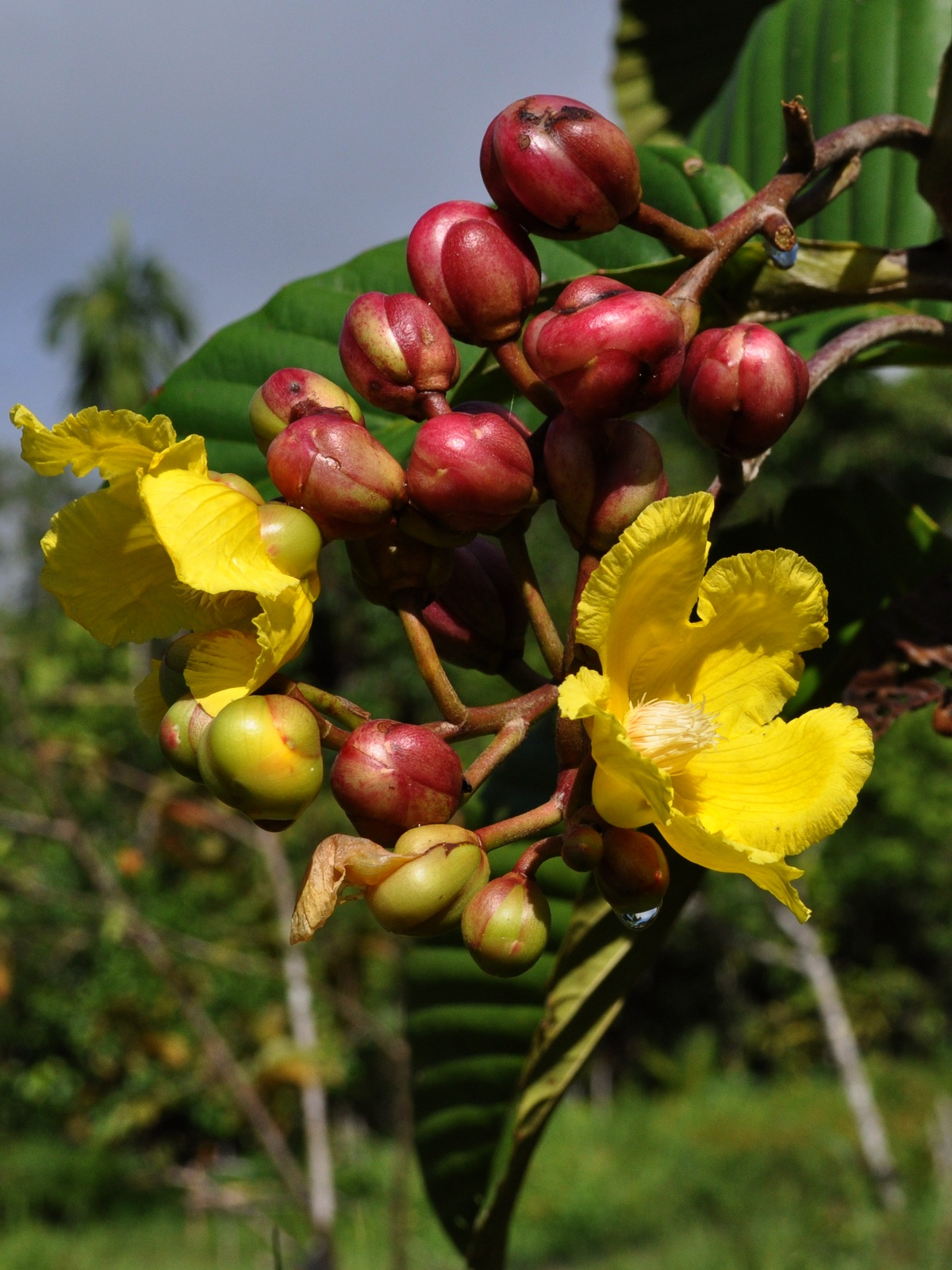

Scientific classification
- Kingdom: Plantae
- Clade: Tracheophytes
- Clade: Angiosperms
- Clade: Eudicots
- Order: Dilleniales
- Family: Dilleniaceae
- Genus: Dillenia
- Species: D. suffruticosa

Binomial name
- Dillenia suffruticosa (Griff ex Hook.f. & Thomson) Martelli

Synonyms
- Dillenia burbidgei (Hook.f.) Martelli; Dillenia suffruticosa var. borneensis (Ridl.) Ridl.; Wormia burbidgei Hook.f. (Unresolved); Wormia subsessilis var. borneensis Ridl; Wormia suffruticosa Griff.

= Dillenia suffruticosa =

Species of flowering plant

Dillenia suffruticosa, also known as simpoh air, simpor, or CB leaf, is a species of Dillenia found in tropical South East Asia in secondary forest and swampy ground. It is a highly invasive weed in Sri Lanka.

The simpor is the national flower of Brunei, and can be found everywhere across the country. Claire Waight Keller included the plant to represent the country in Meghan Markle's wedding veil, which included the distinctive flora of each Commonwealth country.

== Description ==
The simpor tree is a large, evergreen shrub that grows to 6–10 metres (20–33 ft) metres high. It has a stout trunk and forms thickets.

Its leaves are simple and arranged alternatively like cabbage. Each leaf blade is 12–40 centimetres (4.7–15.7 in) long and 6–12 cm (2.4–4.7 in) wide on 2–6 centimetres (0.79–2.36 in) long petioles. Its young leaves are fuzzy underneath.

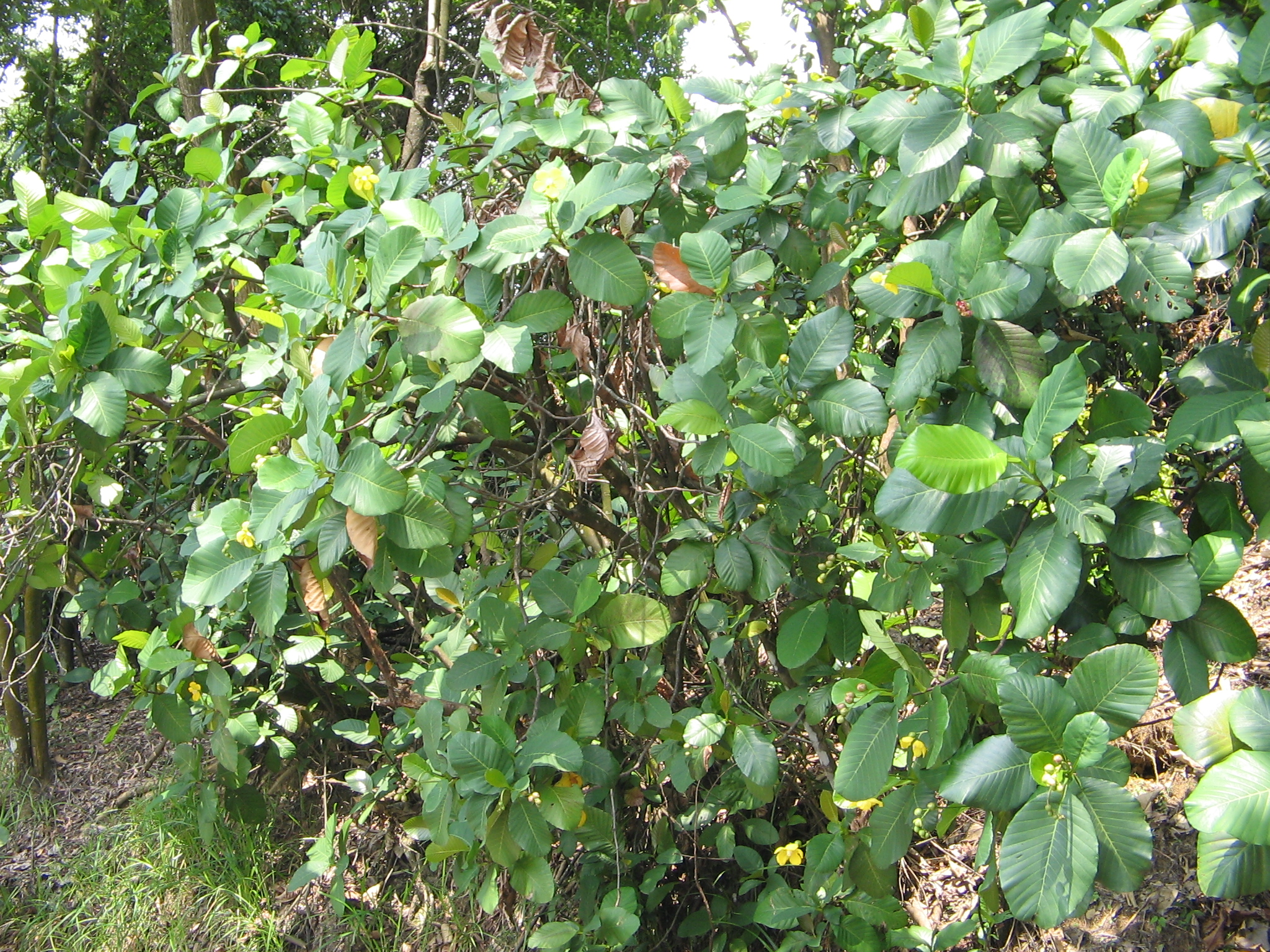
Branches of simpor leaf

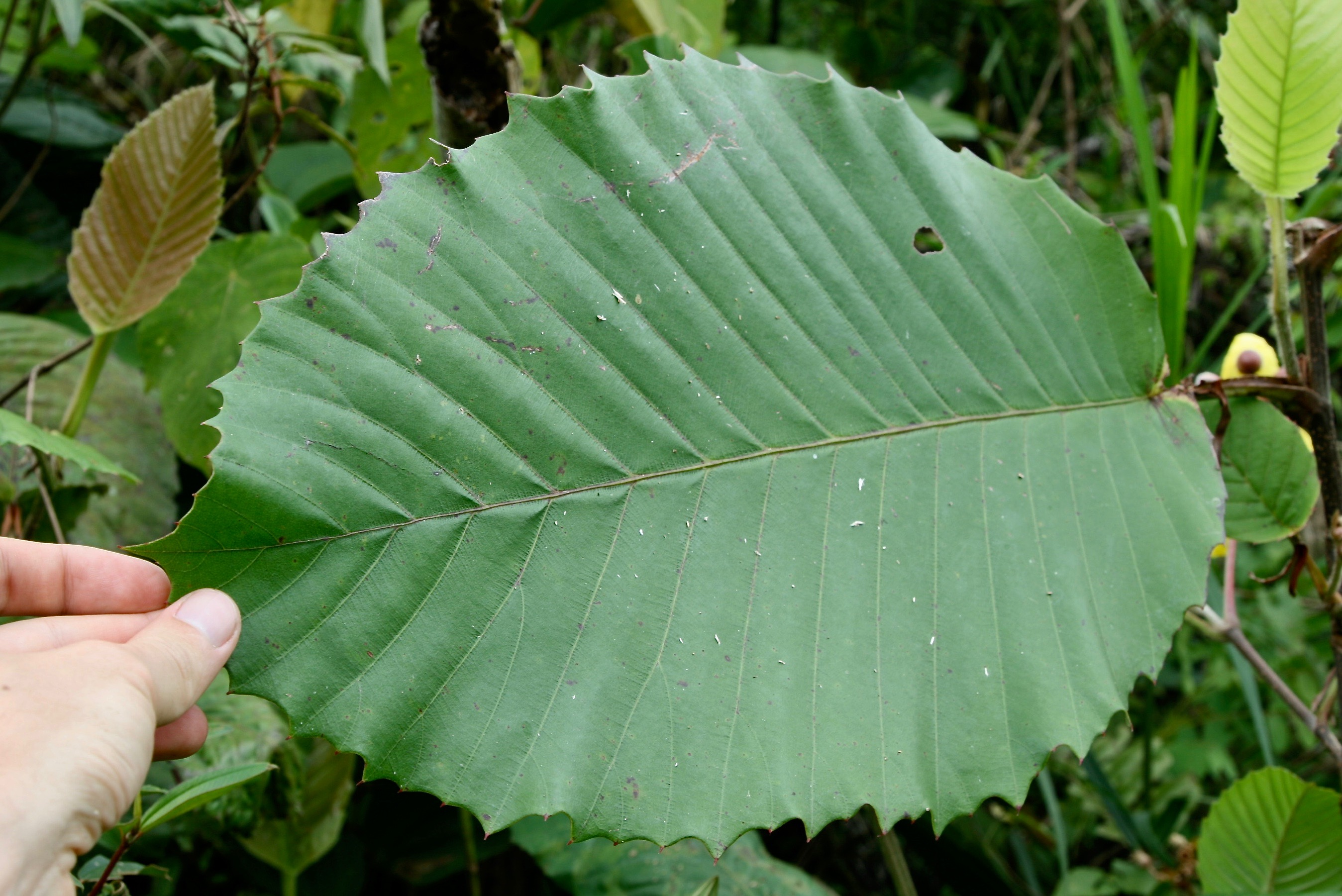
D. suffruticosa leaf

The tree flowers after 3 or 4 years.

=== Flowers and fruit ===
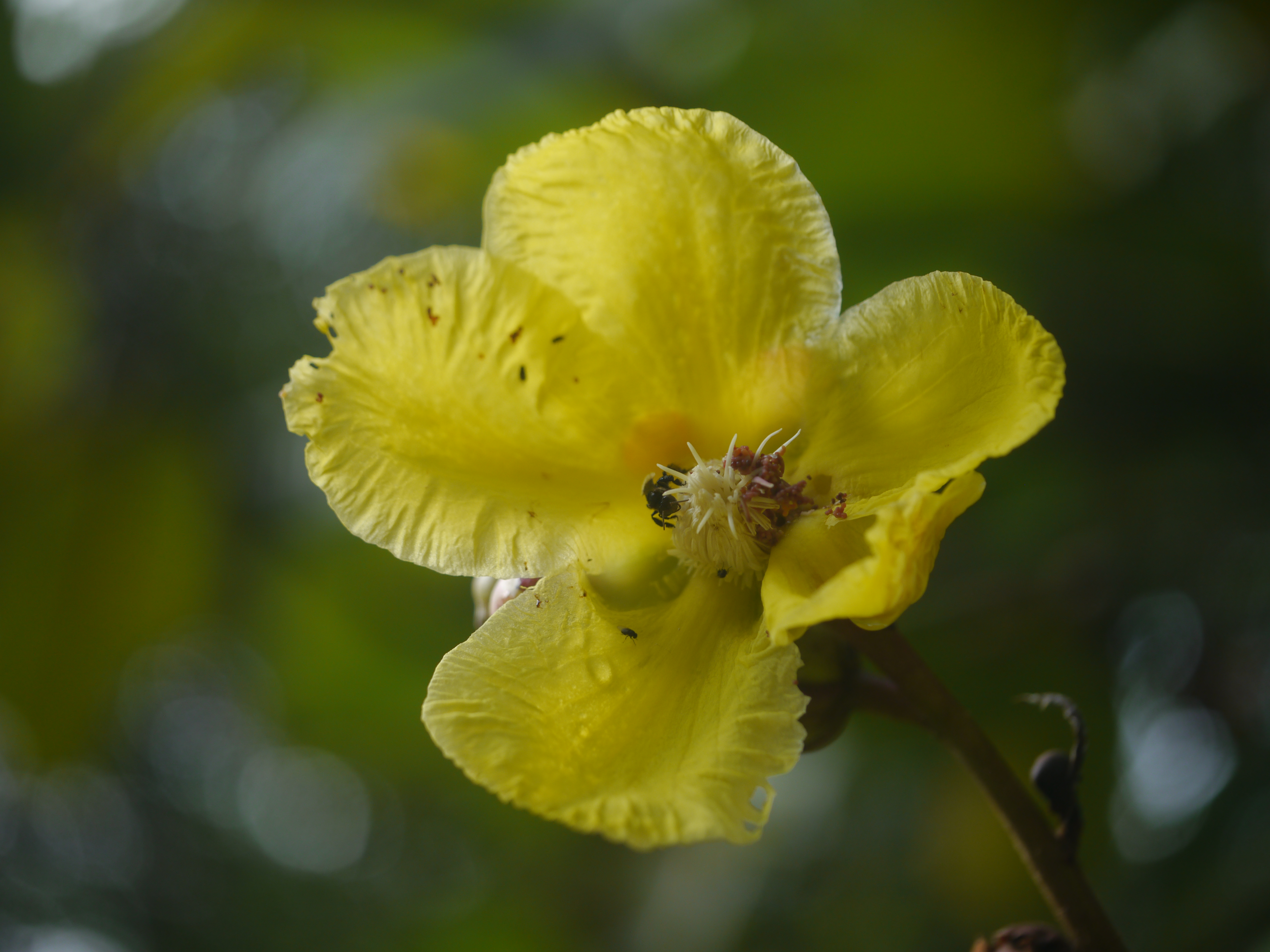
An ant pollinating a D. suffruticosa flower.

The flowers bloom on long peduncles facing downwards, 8–13 cm (3.1–5.1 in) wide, and yellow in colour. They have no scent and no nectar. The flower blooms daily at around 3 am and opening flowers are fully opened one hour before sunrise. They are pollinated by bees, small beetles as well as flies that scramble over them. They point up when they produce and develop fruit after they are pollinated, the fruits take up to 5 weeks to fully develop.

The developed fruit is a star-shaped capsule with 7 or 8 rays, it is pink with white borders. It has scarlet pulp with purple or pale brown seeds that have fleshy, bright red arils. The fruits are eaten by birds and even by monkeys.

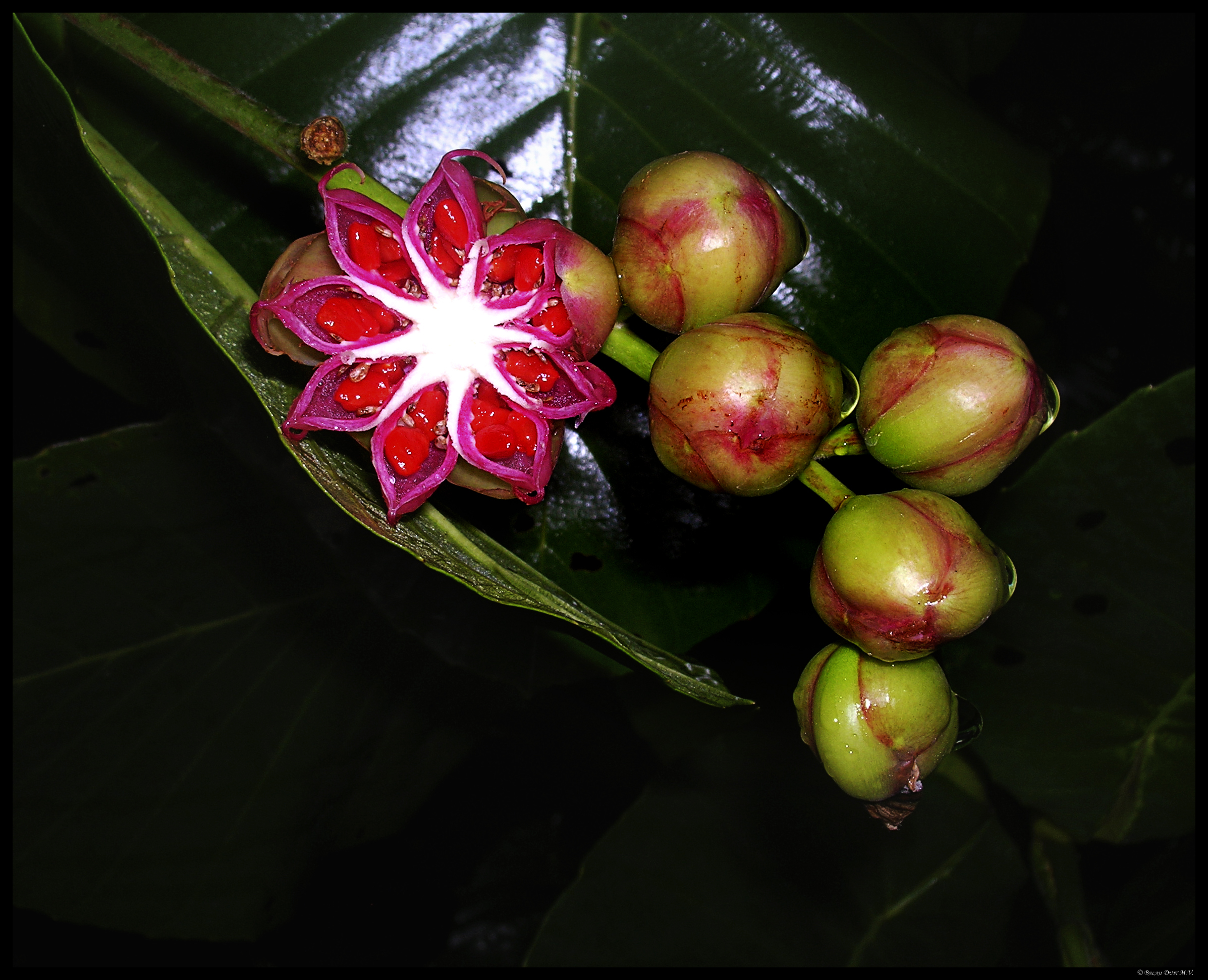
Opened D. suffruticosa fruit capsule with seeds inside

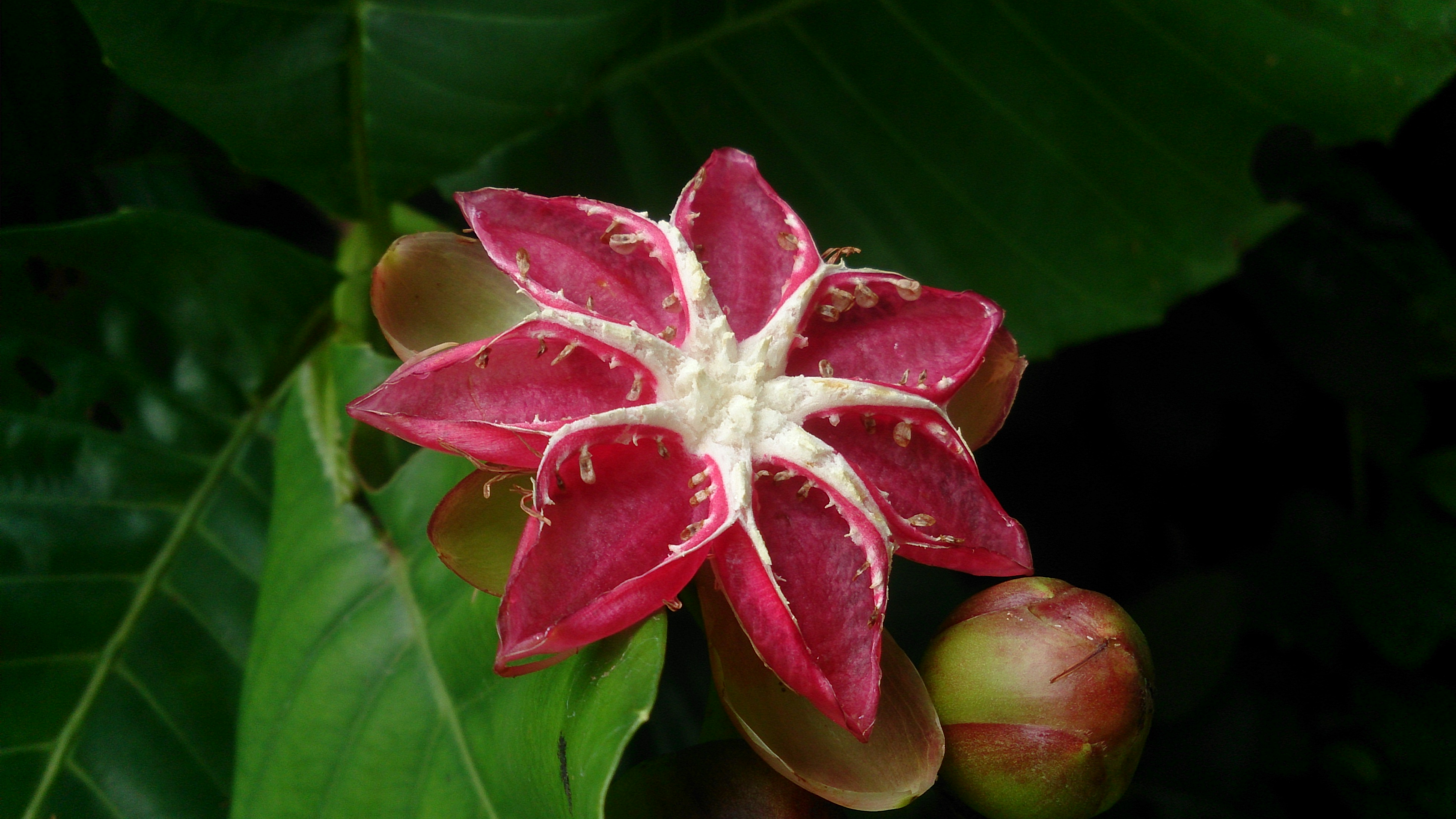
Empty D. suffruticosa fruit capsule

== Distribution and habitat ==
The plant is found in tropical South East Asia in secondary forest and swampy grounds that are undisturbed forest such as riversides up to 700 m altitude. They can also be found on alluvial places such as swamps, mangroves, riversides, but sometimes also present on hillsides and ridges, which have clayey to sandy soil texture. Dillenia suffruticosa is also found in Sri Lanka, Peninsular Malaysia, Sumatra, Java, Borneo and in the tropical regions of Singapore, and Hawaii (where it is an introduced species).

== Uses ==
Dillenia suffruticosa has other uses, these include medicine and storage. The medicinal properties include the leaves and roots being used against inflammations, itch, stomach ache, and recovery after delivery. The storage properties consist of large leaves of the plant being used to wrap food (tempeh or fermented soy bean cake) instead of using a plastic bag and/or the leaves can be shaped into a cone to contain or hold food (rojak). They can be used to attract birds in urban areas and are planted as an ornamental plant.
