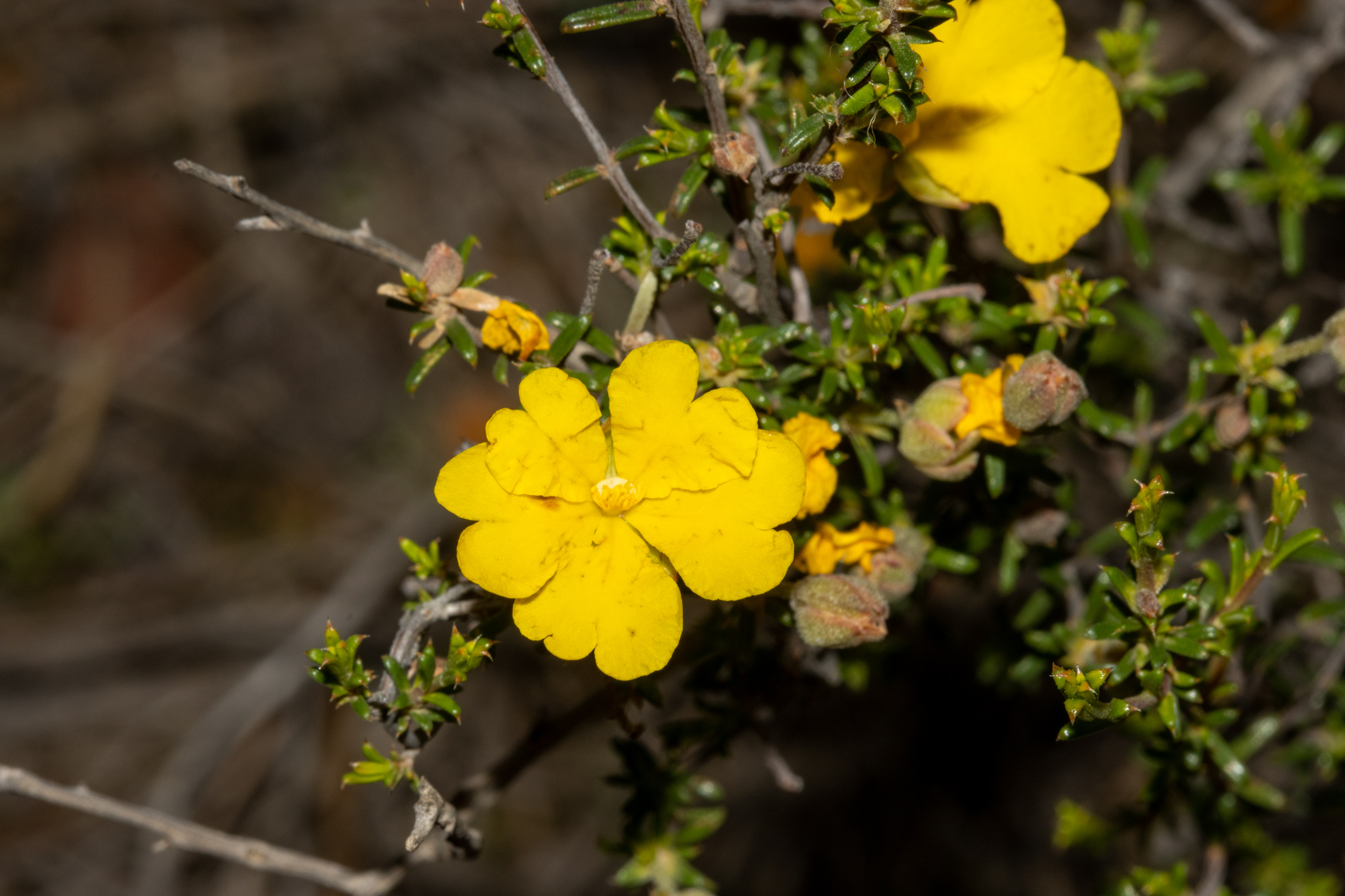

Scientific classification
- Kingdom: Plantae
- Clade: Tracheophytes
- Clade: Angiosperms
- Clade: Eudicots
- Order: Dilleniales
- Family: Dilleniaceae
- Genus: Hibbertia
- Species: H. eatoniae

Binomial name
- Hibbertia eatoniae Diels

= Hibbertia eatoniae =

Species of flowering plant

Hibbertia eatoniae is a species of shrub in the family Dilleniaceae and is endemic to the south-west of Western Australia. It is an erect, wiry shrub that typically grows to a height of 15–60 cm (5.9–23.6 in). It flowers from May to October and produces yellow flowers. It is similar to Hibbertia ancistrophylla but has leaves with short, scale-covered petioles, flowers with peduncles and hairy carpels and to H. lepidocalyx but has smaller leaves. It was first formally described in 1904 by Ludwig Diels in Botanische Jahrbücher für Systematik, Pflanzengeschichte und Pflanzengeographie. The specific epithet (eatoniae) honours Alice Eaton of Youndegin, who collected the type specimens.

== See also ==
- List of Hibbertia species
