= Hibbertia axillibarba =

Conservation status
- Priority One — Poorly Known Taxa (DEC)

Scientific classification
- Kingdom: Plantae
- Clade: Tracheophytes
- Clade: Angiosperms
- Clade: Eudicots
- Order: Dilleniales
- Family: Dilleniaceae
- Genus: Hibbertia
- Species: H. axillibarba

Binomial name
- Hibbertia axillibarba J.R.Wheeler

Species of flowering plant

Hibbertia axillibarba is a species of flowering plant in the family Dilleniaceae and is endemic to a restricted area of the south-west of Western Australia. It is a shrub with crowded narrow oblong to linear leaves. Its yellow flowers are arranged singly on short side shoots with ten or eleven stamens fused at their bases on one side of the two densely hairy carpels.

== Description ==
Hibbertia axillibarba is a shrub that typically grows to a height of 30–70 cm (12–28 in) with glabrous branchlets that are ridged below the petioles. Its leaves are crowded, angled upwards, narrow oblong to linear, 4–12 mm (0.16–0.47 in) long and 1–1.5 mm (0.039–0.059 in) wide on a petiole less than 0.5 mm (0.020 in) long and with a sharp point on the tip. The flowers are arranged singly in leaf axils on the ends of short side shoots with usually three narrow egg-shaped, sharply-pointed bracts 1.5–4 mm (0.059–0.157 in) long. The five sepals are elliptic, the outer sepals 4–6 mm (0.16–0.24 in) long and the inner ones 5–7 mm (0.20–0.28 in) long. The five petals are yellow, egg-shaped with the narrower end towards the base and 6.5–10 mm (0.26–0.39 in) long with a notch at the tip. There are ten or eleven stamens, fused at the base and all on one side of the two carpels that each contain two ovules. Flowering occurs from July to October.

== Taxonomy ==
Hibbertia axillibarba was first formally described in 2000 by Judith R. Wheeler in the journal Nuytsia from specimens she collected at South Ironcap, east of Hyden in 1999. The specific epithet (axillibarba) is derived from Latin words meaning "an axil" and "a beard", referring to hairs in the leaf axils.

== Distribution and habitat ==
This hibbertia grows in heath and shrubland on laterite and is only known from near the type location.

== Conservation status ==
Goodenia axillibarba is classified as "Priority One" by the Government of Western Australia Department of Parks and Wildlife, meaning that it is known from only one or a few locations which are potentially at risk.

== See also ==
- List of Hibbertia species
