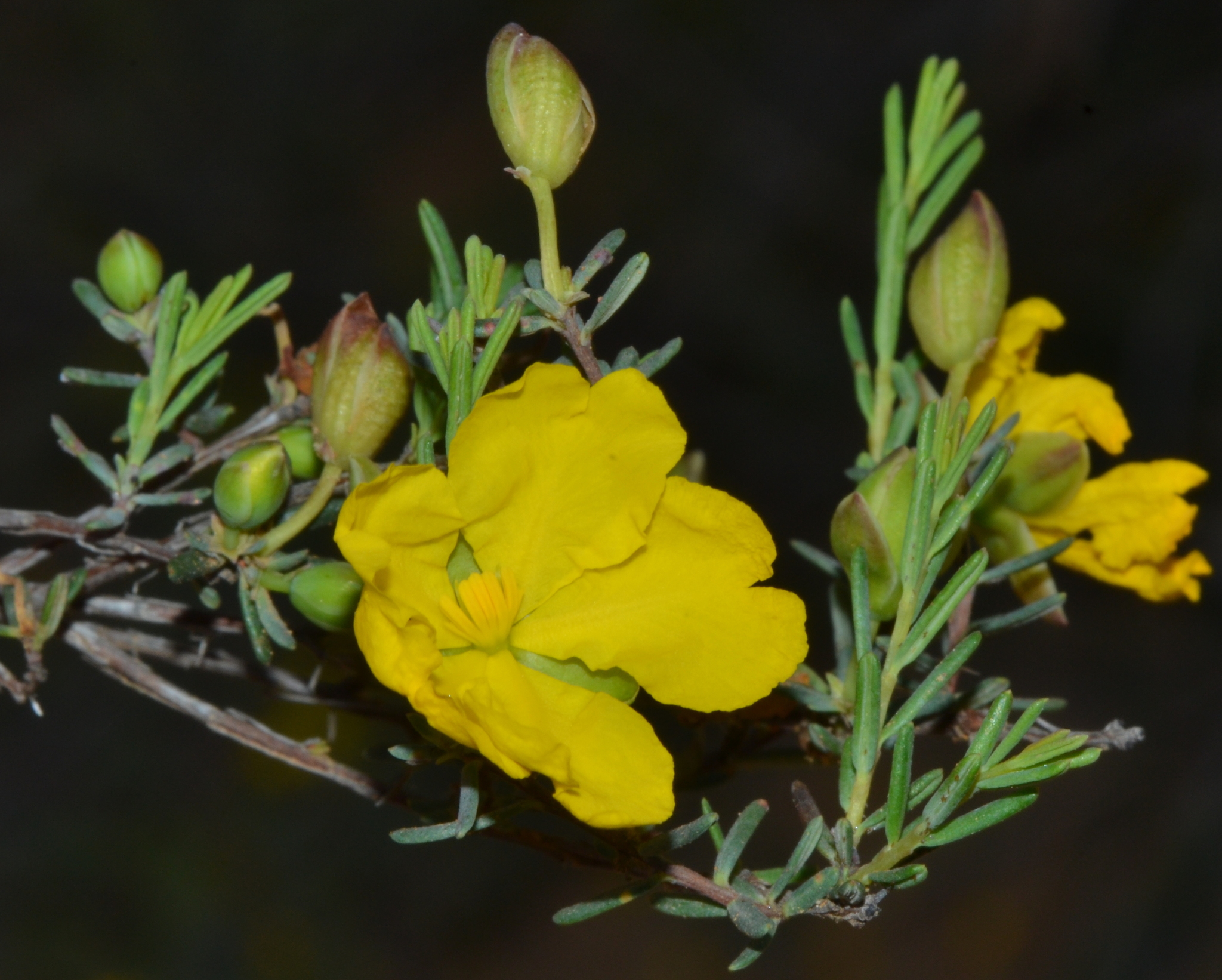

Scientific classification
- Kingdom: Plantae
- Clade: Tracheophytes
- Clade: Angiosperms
- Clade: Eudicots
- Order: Dilleniales
- Family: Dilleniaceae
- Genus: Hibbertia
- Species: H. stenophylla

Binomial name
- Hibbertia stenophylla J.R.Wheeler

= Hibbertia stenophylla =

Species of flowering plant

Hibbertia stenophylla is a species of flowering plant in the family Dilleniaceae and is endemic to Western Australia. It is a shrub with thick, linear to cylindrical leaves and yellow flowers with ten stamens in a single group on one side of two densely hairy carpels.

== Description ==
Hibbertia stenophylla is a shrub that typically grows to a height of up to 60 cm (24 in) and has glabrous branchlets. The leaves are spirally arranged, linear but appearing cylindrical, mostly 2.5–9 mm (0.098–0.354 in) long and 0.5–0.8 mm (0.020–0.031 in) wide on a petiole 0.5–1.0 mm (0.020–0.039 in) long. The flowers are arranged singly in leaf axils or on the ends of short side-branches on a peduncle 1.0–4.5 mm (0.039–0.177 in) long with two to four bracts 0.5–0.8 mm (0.020–0.031 in) long. The five sepals are joined at the base, 4–6 mm (0.16–0.24 in) long, the outer sepals 2–3 mm (0.079–0.118 in) wide and the inner sepals 3–4.5 mm (0.12–0.18 in) wide. The five petals are yellow, egg-shaped with the narrower end towards the base and 5–10 mm (0.20–0.39 in) long with a deep notch at the tip. There are ten stamens fused at the base on one side of the two densely hairy carpels that each contain three or four ovules.

== Taxonomy ==
Hibbertia stenophylla was first formally described in 2002 Judith R. Wheeler in the journal Nuytsia from specimens collected by Michael Clyde Hislop in 1994, north-east of Kalannie. The specific epithet (stenophylla) means "narrow-leaved".

== Distribution and habitat ==
This hibbertia grows in heathland and shrubland in the Avon Wheatbelt, Coolgardie, Geraldton Sandplains, Mallee, Murchison and Yalgoo biogeographic regions of Western Australia.

== See also ==
- List of Hibbertia species
