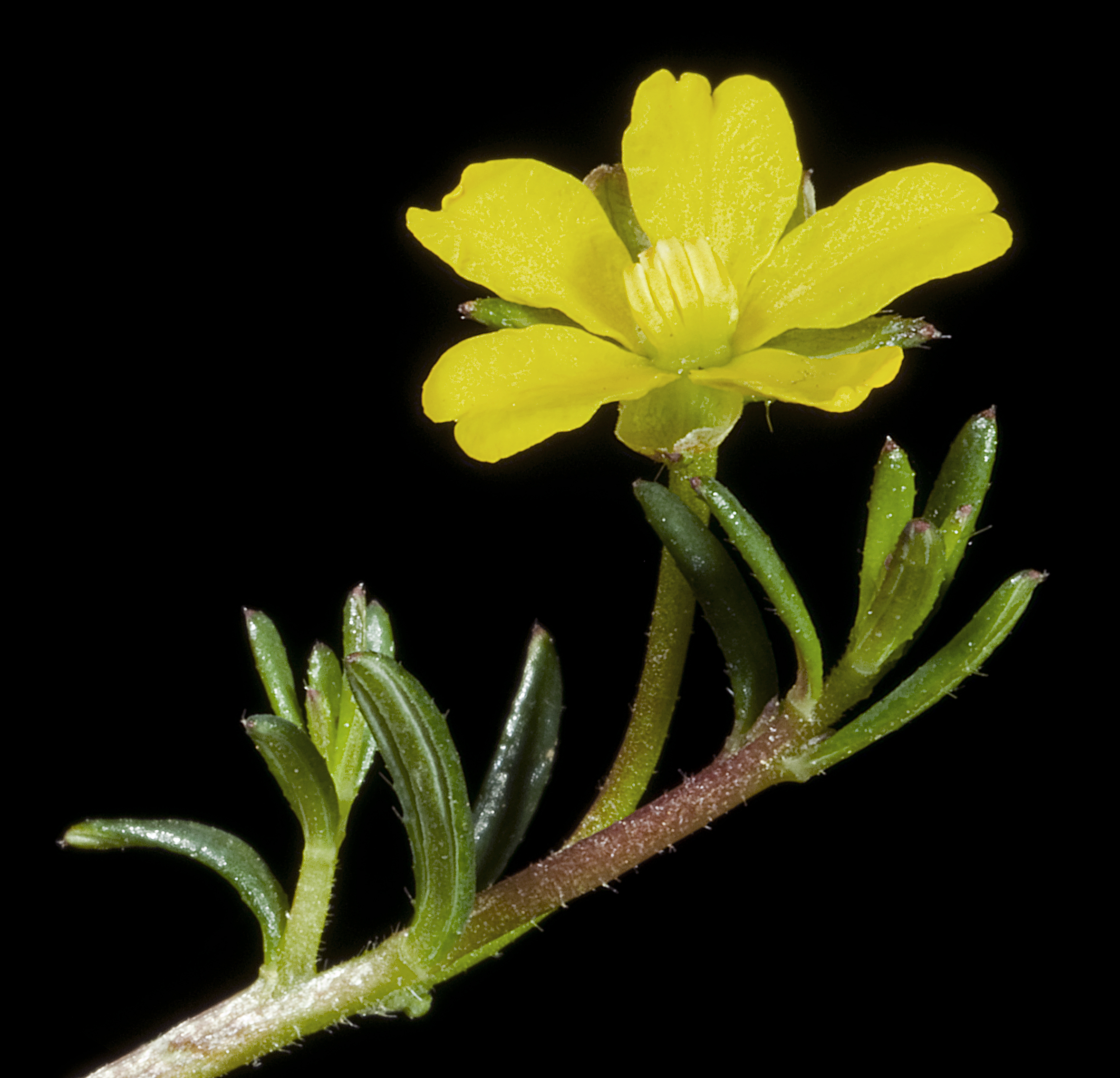

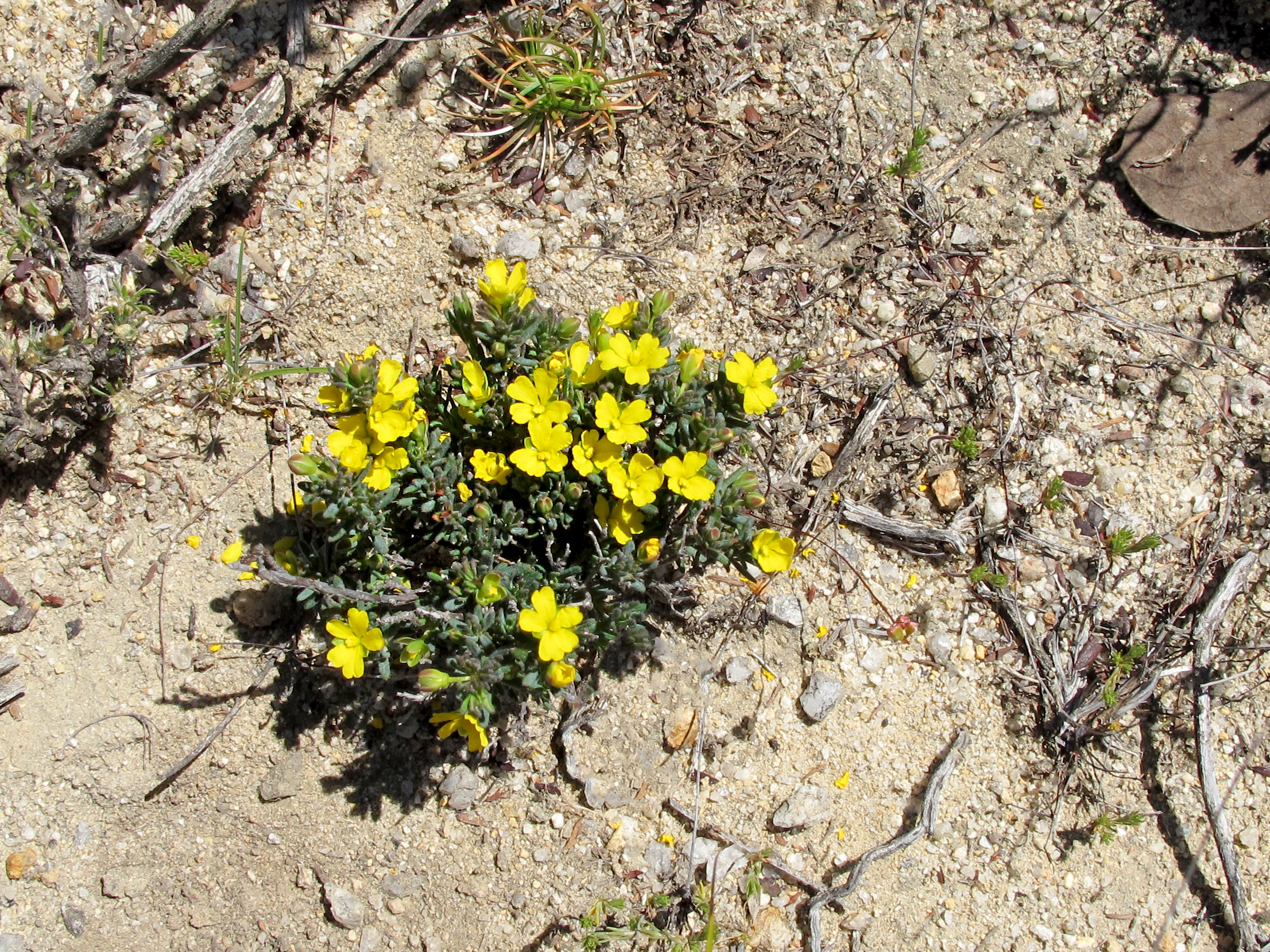

Scientific classification
- Kingdom: Plantae
- Clade: Tracheophytes
- Clade: Angiosperms
- Clade: Eudicots
- Order: Dilleniales
- Family: Dilleniaceae
- Genus: Hibbertia
- Species: H. avonensis

Binomial name
- Hibbertia avonensis J.R.Wheeler

= Hibbertia avonensis =

Species of flowering plant

Hibbertia avonensis is a species of flowering plant in the family Dilleniaceae and is endemic to the south-west of Western Australia. It is a shrub with narrow oblong leaves and bright yellow flowers arranged singly in leaf axils with about ten stamens fused at their bases on one side of the two carpels.

== Description ==
Hibbertia avonensis is a shrub that grows to a height of 60 cm (24 in). Its leaves are spirally arranged, narrow oblong, 2.5–8 mm (0.098–0.315 in) long and 0.8–1.4 mm (0.031–0.055 in) wide and more or less sessile. The upper surface of the leaves is covered with small tubercules, each with a hair in the centre. The flowers are arranged singly in upper leaf axils or on the ends of short side shoots and are 7–13 mm (0.28–0.51 in) in diameter, on a peduncle 2–10 mm (0.079–0.394 in) long with up to three egg-shaped bracts 1–2 mm (0.039–0.079 in) long at the base. The five sepals are 3.5–6 mm (0.14–0.24 in) long, the outer sepals 2–2.5 mm (0.079–0.098 in) wide and the inner ones 2.5–3 mm (0.098–0.118 in) wide. The five petals are bright yellow, egg-shaped with the narrower end towards the base and 4–8 mm (0.16–0.31 in) long with a notch at the tip. There are usually ten stamens, fused at the base and on one side of the two carpels that each contain two ovules. Flowering occurs from August to October.

== Taxonomy ==
Hibbertia avonensis was first formally described in 2002 by Judith R. Wheeler in the journal Nuytsia from specimens collected by Ruurd Dirk Hoogland near Pingrup in 1971. The specific epithet (avonensis) refers to the distribution of this species that occurs almost entirely in the Avon Wheatbelt biogeographic region.

== Distribution ==
This hibbertia grows in heath, shrubland, usually in sandy soil, mostly in the Avon Wheatbelt.

== Conservation status ==
Goodenia avonensis is classified as "not threatened" by the Government of Western Australia Department of Parks and Wildlife.

== See also ==
- List of Hibbertia species
