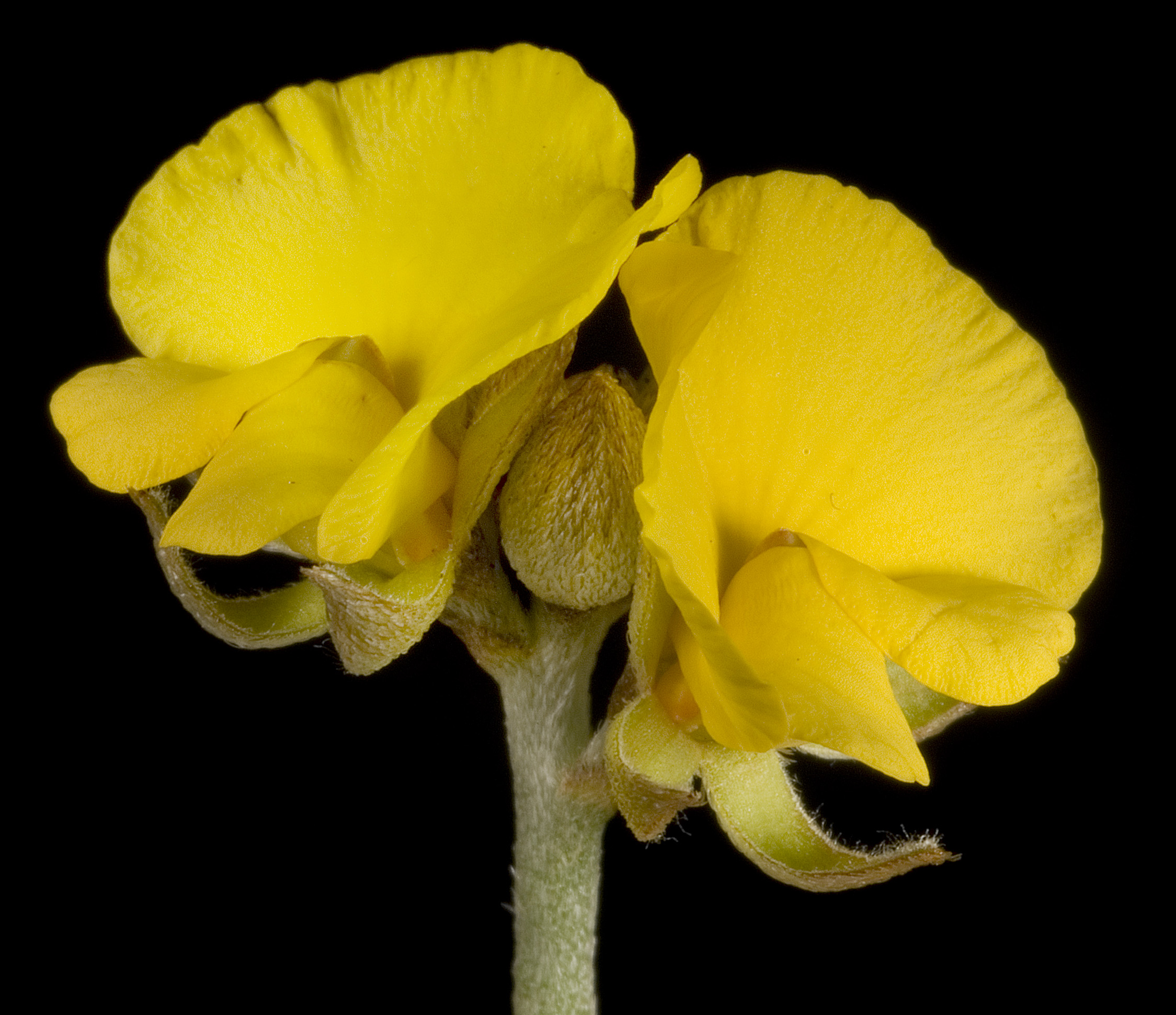

Scientific classification
- Kingdom: Plantae
- Clade: Tracheophytes
- Clade: Angiosperms
- Clade: Eudicots
- Clade: Rosids
- Order: Fabales
- Family: Fabaceae
- Subfamily: Faboideae
- Genus: Jacksonia
- Species: J. condensata

Binomial name
- Jacksonia condensata Crisp & J.R.Wheeler

Synonyms
- Jacksonia capitata var. rigida E.Pritz.

= Jacksonia condensata =

Species of legume

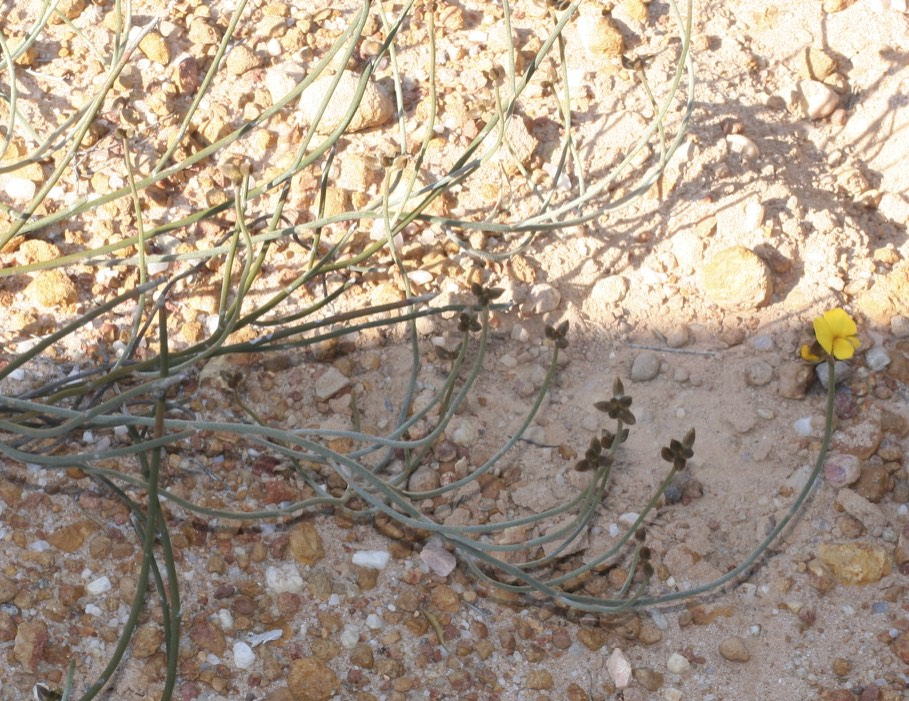
Habit near the road to Jurien Bay

Jacksonia condensata is a species of flowering plant in the family Fabaceae and is endemic to the south west of Western Australia. It is a slender, ascending to erect shrub with sharply-pointed phylloclades, the leaves reduced to scales, yellow to yellow-orange flowers, and woody, hairy pods.

== Description ==
Jacksonia condensata is a slender, ascending to erect shrub that typically grows up to 5–60 cm (2.0–23.6 in) high and 20–40 cm (7.9–15.7 in) wide, its branches yellowish green and slightly ribbed. Its end branches are sharply-pointed phylloclades, its leaves reduced toothed, dark brown, narrowly egg-shaped scales, 1.3–2.3 mm (0.051–0.091 in) long and 0.8–1.8 mm (0.031–0.071 in) wide. The flowers are borne in heads or clusters at the ends of branches on a pedicel up to 2 mm (0.079 in) long. There are toothed, broadly egg-shaped bracteoles 1.2–2.25 mm (0.047–0.089 in) long and 0.7–1 mm (0.028–0.039 in) wide at the base of the floral tube that is 0.9–1 mm (0.035–0.039 in) long and not ribbed. The sepals are membranous, the lobes 3.7–4.7 mm (0.15–0.19 in) long, 1.4–1.6 mm (0.055–0.063 in) wide and fused at the base for 1.3–2 mm (0.051–0.079 in). The flowers are yellow to yellow-orange, the standard petal 4.9–6.3 mm (0.19–0.25 in) long and 7.3–8.5 mm (0.29–0.33 in) wide, the wings 4.6–5.7 mm (0.18–0.22 in) long, and the keel 3.5–3.9 mm (0.14–0.15 in) long. The filaments of the stamens are yellow and tinged with red, 2.1–3 mm (0.083–0.118 in) long. Flowering occurs from August to November, and the fruit is a woody, elliptic pod, round in cross-section, 4.5–6.5 mm (0.18–0.26 in) long and 4.5–5.1 mm (0.18–0.20 in) wide.

== Taxonomy ==
Jacksonia condensata was first formally described in 1984 by Michael Crisp and Judy Wheeler in the journal Nuytsia from specimens collected by Ludwig Preiss in 1840. The specific epithet (condensata) means 'condensed' or 'crowded' referring to the flowers.

== Distribution and habitat ==
This species of Jacksonia grows in heath or woodland in sand or loam in flats and undulating places between Eneabba, Porongurup National Park and Cape Arid National Park in the Avon Wheatbelt, Esperance Plains, Geraldton Sandplains, Jarrah Forest and Mallee bioregions of south-western Western Australia.

== Conservation status ==
Jacksonia condensata is listed as "not threatened" by the Government of Western Australia Department of Biodiversity, Conservation and Attractions.
