= Hibbertia ulicifolia =

Scientific classification
- Kingdom: Plantae
- Clade: Tracheophytes
- Clade: Angiosperms
- Clade: Eudicots
- Order: Dilleniales
- Family: Dilleniaceae
- Genus: Hibbertia
- Species: H. ulicifolia

Binomial name
- Hibbertia ulicifolia (Benth.) J.R.Wheeler

Species of flowering plant

Hibbertia ulicifolia is a species of flowering plant in the family Dilleniaceae and is endemic to the south coast of Western Australia. It is a shrub with spirally arranged, linear to awl-shaped leaves and golden yellow flowers with nine stamens fused at the bases, all on one side of two densely shortly-hairy carpels.

== Description ==
Hibbertia ulicifolia is a shrub that typically grows to a height of up to 1.2 m (3 ft 11 in) and has branchlets covered with minute, star-shaped hairs when young. The leaves are spirally arranged, linear to awl-shaped, 7–14 mm (0.28–0.55 in) long and 0.6–1.5 mm (0.024–0.059 in) wide on a petiole 0.3–1 mm (0.012–0.039 in) long. The flowers are arranged singly in leaf axils on a thin peduncle 4–8 mm (0.16–0.31 in) long with egg-shaped bracts 1–3 mm (0.039–0.118 in) long at the base of the sepals. The five sepals are joined at the base, 4.0–6.5 mm (0.16–0.26 in) long, the inner ones slightly broader than the outer ones. The five petals are golden yellow, egg-shaped with the narrower end towards the base and 4–7 mm (0.16–0.28 in) long with a notch at the tip. There are nine stamens, fused at the base on one side of the two densely, shortly-hairy carpels that each contain two ovules. Flowering mostly occurs between September and November.

== Taxonomy ==
This hibbertia was first formally described in 1863 by George Bentham who gave it the name Hibbertia acerosa var. ulicifolia in Flora Australiensis from specimens collected by William Baxter at King George Sound. In 2000, Judith R. Wheeler raised the variety to species status as H. ulicifolia in the journal Nuytsia. The specific epithet (ulicifolia) means "Ulex- (gorse) leaved".

== Distribution and habitat ==
This species mainly grows in heath and on scree slopes in near-coastal areas mainly from Mount Le Grande to Duke of Orleans Bay in the Cape Arid National Park.

== Conservation status ==
Hibbertia hamulosa is classified as "not threatened" by the Western Australian Government Department of Parks and Wildlife.

== See also ==
- List of Hibbertia species
