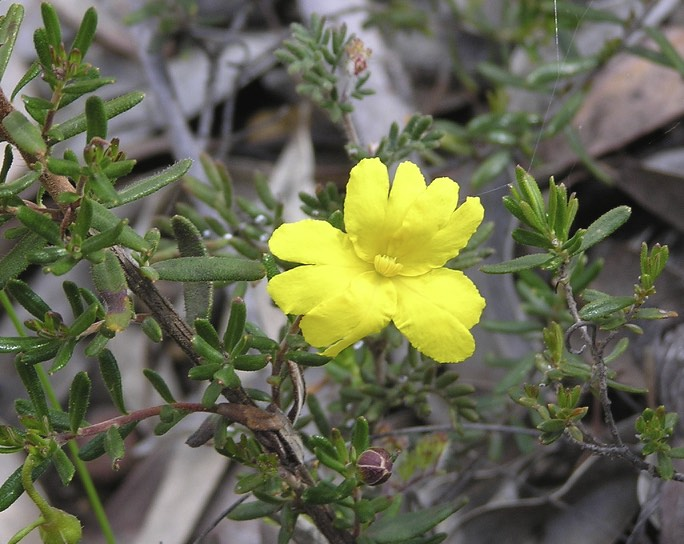
- Near Mundaring Weir

Scientific classification
- Kingdom: Plantae
- Clade: Embryophytes
- Clade: Tracheophytes
- Clade: Spermatophytes
- Clade: Angiosperms
- Clade: Eudicots
- Order: Dilleniales
- Family: Dilleniaceae
- Genus: Hibbertia
- Species: H. diamesogenos

Binomial name
- Hibbertia diamesogenos (Steud.) J.R.Wheeler

Synonyms
- Hibbertia kochii Maiden & Betche; Hibbertia lineata var. parviflora Benth.; Hibbertia rhadinopoda F.Muell.; Pleurandra diamesogenos Steud.

= Hibbertia diamesogenos =

Species of flowering plant

Hibbertia diamesogenos is a species of flowering plant in the family Dilleniaceae and is endemic to the south-west of Western Australia. It is a prostrate, mat-forming or ascending shrub that grows to a height of up to 60 cm (24 in). The shrub varies in its stature, leaf size and hairiness and flower size and some specimens have two or three staminodes either side of the stamens.

The species was first formally described in 1845 by Ernst Gottlieb von Steudel who gave it the name Pleurandra diamesogenos in Johann Georg Christian Lehmann's Plantae Preissianae. In 2004, Judith Roderick Wheeler changed the name to Hibbertia diamesogenos in the journal Nuytsia. The specific epithet (diamesogenos) is derived from Greek, meaning "across", "middle" and kind".

This hibbertia grows in a variety of soils and habitats in the Esperance Plains, Jarrah Forest, Swan Coastal Plain and Warren biogeographic regions of south-western Western Australia.

== See also ==
- List of Hibbertia species
