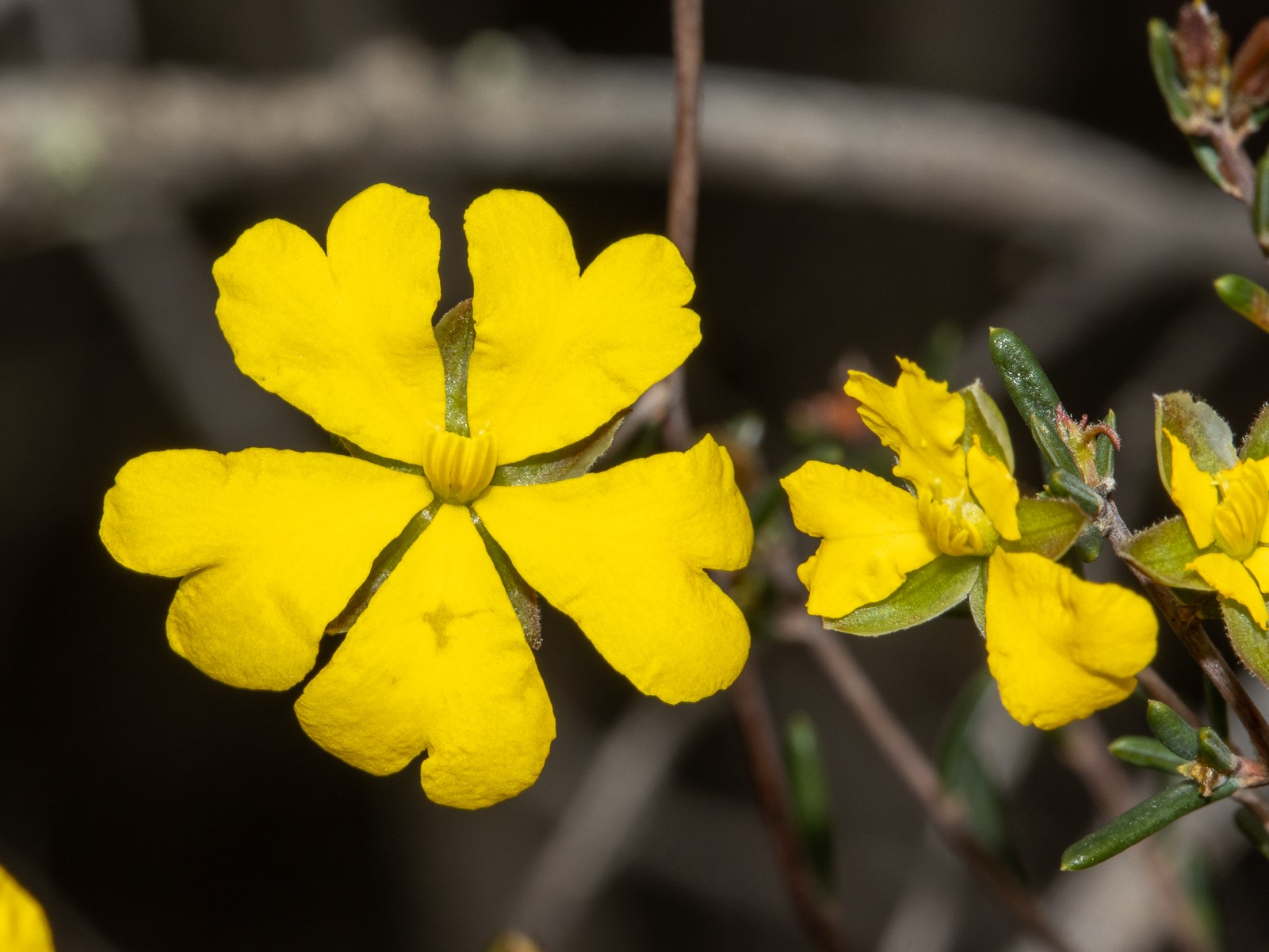

Scientific classification
- Kingdom: Plantae
- Clade: Tracheophytes
- Clade: Angiosperms
- Clade: Eudicots
- Order: Dilleniales
- Family: Dilleniaceae
- Genus: Hibbertia
- Species: H. ancistrotricha

Binomial name
- Hibbertia ancistrotricha J.R.Wheeler

= Hibbertia ancistrotricha =

Species of flowering plant

Hibbertia ancistrotricha is a species of flowering plant in the family Dilleniaceae and is endemic to the south-west of Western Australia. It is a shrub with narrow oblong to linear leaves and bright yellow flowers arranged singly in leaf axils with about ten stamens fused at their bases on one side of the carpels.

== Description ==
Hibbertia ancistrotricha is a shrub that grows to a height of 0.3–1.3 m (1 ft 0 in – 4 ft 3 in). Its leaves are spirally arranged, narrow oblong to linear, 2.5–8 mm (0.098–0.315 in) long and 0.8–1.2 mm (0.031–0.047 in) wide on a petiole up to 0.5 mm (0.020 in) long, with the edges turned downwards. The flowers are arranged singly in leaf axils and are 8–15 mm (0.31–0.59 in) in diameter, on a peduncle 2–8 mm (0.079–0.315 in) long with narrow triangular, leaf-like bracts 1.5–2.5 mm (0.059–0.098 in) long. The five sepals are tinged with red, 4–5 mm (0.16–0.20 in) long, the outer sepals 1.8–2.5 mm (0.071–0.098 in) wide and the inner ones about 3 mm (0.12 in) wide. The five petals are bright yellow, egg-shaped with the narrower end towards the base and 4–7 mm (0.16–0.28 in) long with a notch at the tip. There are usually ten stamens, fused at the base and on one side of the two carpels that each contain four ovules. Flowering mainly occurs from September to November.

== Taxonomy ==
Hibbertia ancistrotricha was first formally described in 2002 by Judith R. Wheeler in the journal Nuytsia from specimens she collected near Dundinin in 2001. The specific epithet (ancistrotricha) means "fish-hook hair", referring to the many hook-shaped hairs on the sepals.

== Distribution and habitat ==
The hibbertia has a small distribution between Bendering, Harrismith and Newdegate in the Avon Wheatbelt and Mallee biogeographic regions where it is found on hills, growing in heath or shrubland in gravelly clay soils.

== See also ==
- List of Hibbertia species
