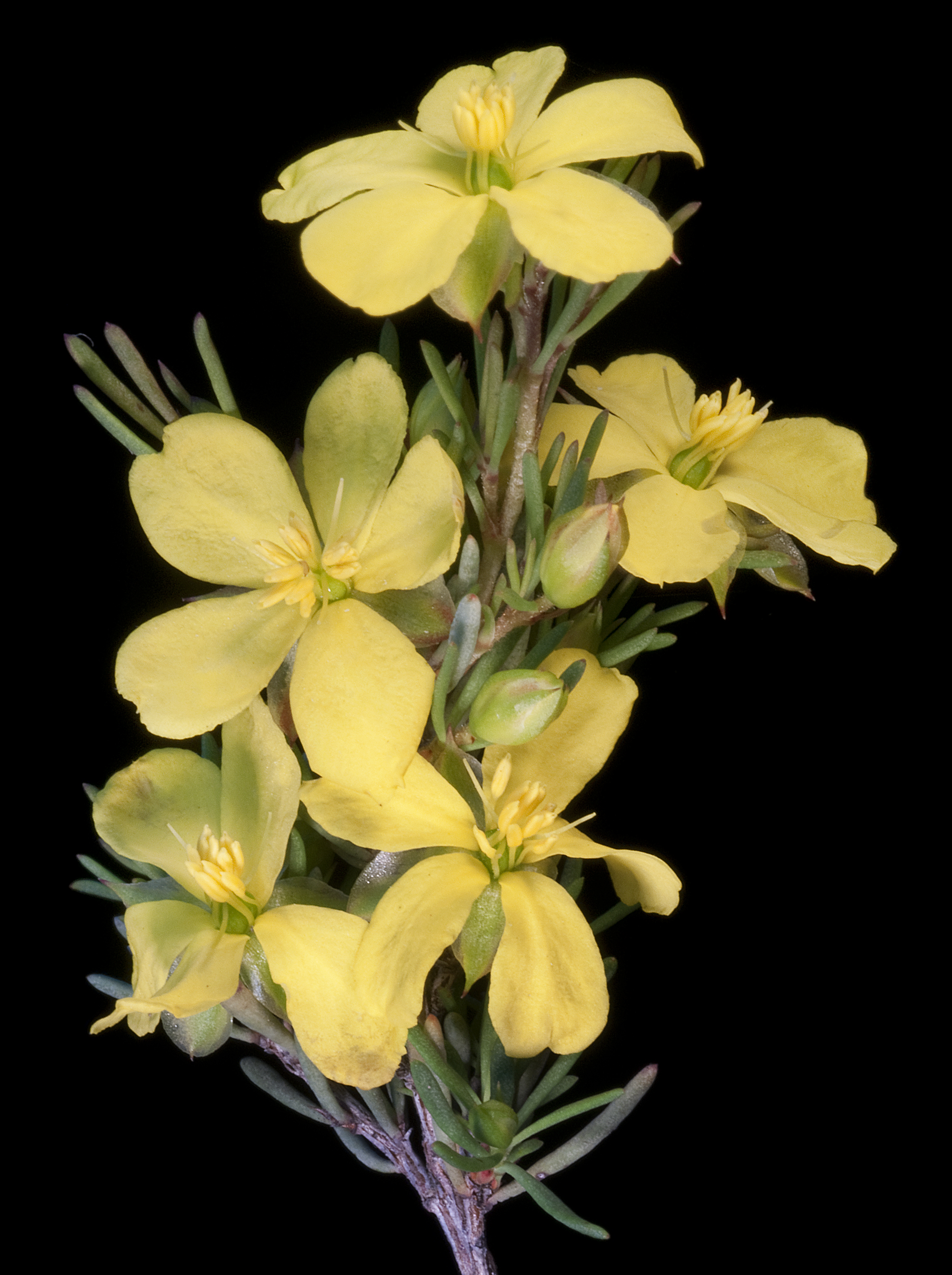

Scientific classification
- Kingdom: Plantae
- Clade: Embryophytes
- Clade: Tracheophytes
- Clade: Spermatophytes
- Clade: Angiosperms
- Clade: Eudicots
- Order: Dilleniales
- Family: Dilleniaceae
- Genus: Hibbertia
- Species: H. hibbertioides

Binomial name
- Hibbertia hibbertioides (Steud.) J.R.Wheeler

= Hibbertia hibbertioides =

Species of flowering plant

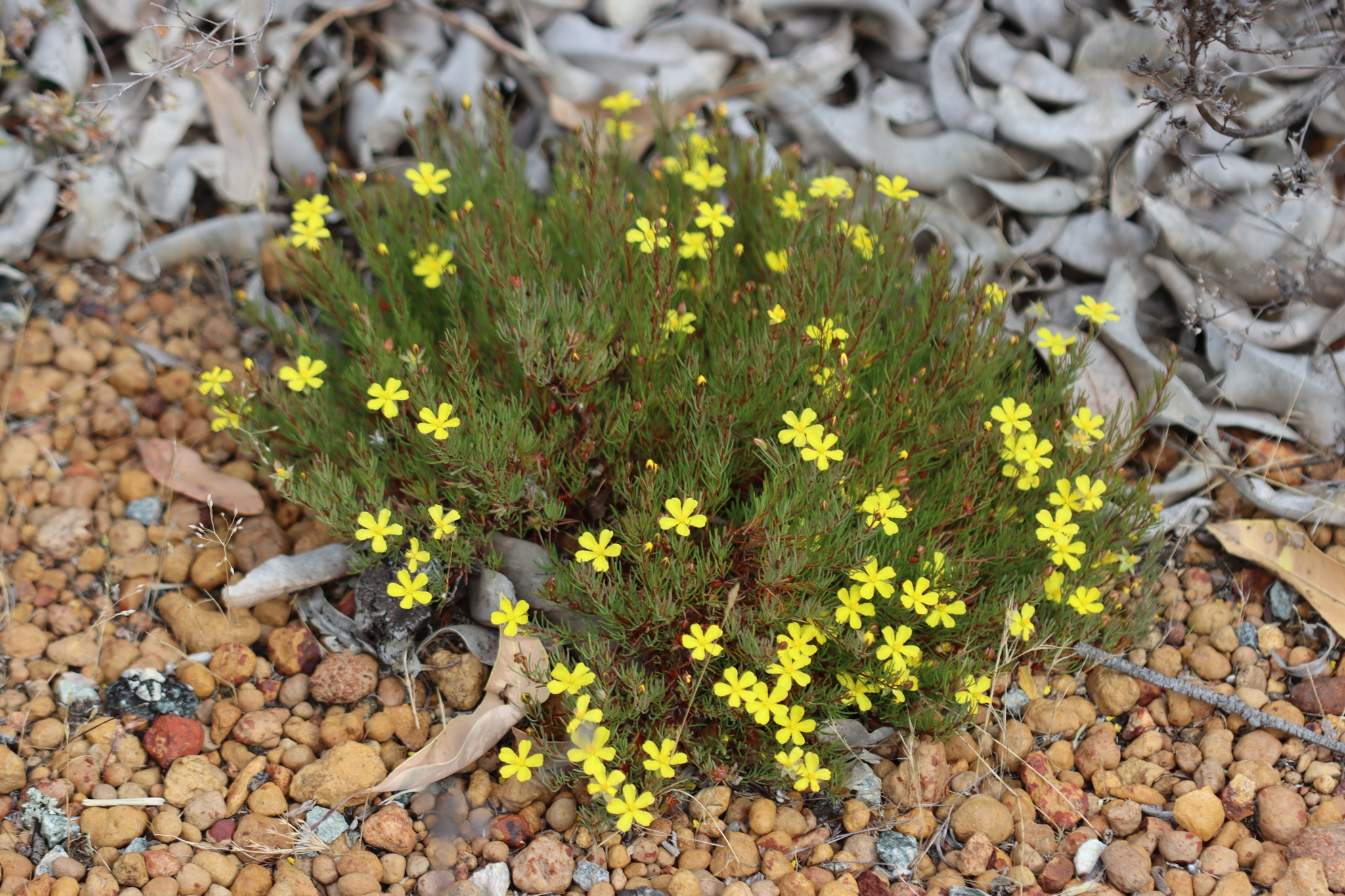
Habit

Hibbertia hibbertioides is a species of flowering plant in the family Dilleniaceae and is endemic to near-coastal areas of south-western Western Australia. It is a small, prostrate or sprawling shrub with crowded, linear cylindrical leaves and yellow flowers with usually eleven stamens arranged in groups around three carpels.

== Description ==
Hibbertia hibbertioides is a prostrate or sprawling shrub that typically grows to a height of up to 30 cm (12 in) and usually has glabrous branches, at least when they are mature. The leaves are crowded, pale-coloured, linear and cylindrical to triangular in cross-section, 3.5–17 mm (0.14–0.67 in) long and 0.5–0.6 mm (0.020–0.024 in) wide. The flowers are arranged singly in leaf axils or on the ends of short side shoots, and are sessile or on a peduncle up to 17 mm (0.67 in) long with inconspicuous bracts 1–2 mm (0.039–0.079 in) long. The flowers are 10–15 mm (0.39–0.59 in) in diameter with five sepals joined at the base, the inner sepals 5.5–7.5 mm (0.22–0.30 in) long, the outer ones distinctly shorter. The five petals are yellow, egg-shaped with the narrower end towards the base and 5–9 mm (0.20–0.35 in) long with a small notch at the tip. There are usually eleven stamens, nine fused at the base in groups of three and one or two free, arranged around the three glabrous carpels that each contain one ovule.

== Taxonomy ==
This species was first formally described in 1845 by Ernst Gottlieb von Steudel and given the name Pleurandra hibbertioides in Johann Georg Christian Lehmann's Plantae Preissianae. In 2002 Judith R. Wheeler changed the name to Hibbertia hibbertioides in the Journal of the Adelaide Botanic Gardens. The specific epithet (hibbertioides) means "Hibbertia-like", the species having originally been placed in the genus Pleurandra.

In 2004, Wheeler described three varieties in the journal Nuytsia and the names are accepted by the Australian Plant Census:

- Hibbertia hibbertioides (Steud.) J.R.Wheeler var. hibbertioides has more or less sessile flowers, stamens 2.5–3.5 mm (0.098–0.138 in) long, and flowers from June to December;
- Hibbertia hibbertioides var. meridionalis J.R.Wheeler has more or less sessile flowers, stamens 1.5–2 mm (0.059–0.079 in) long and flowers sporadically from December to May;
- Hibbertia hibbertioides var. pedunculata J.R.Wheeler has flowers on peduncles 5–17 mm (0.20–0.67 in) long and mainly flowers from September to December.

The varietal epithets mean "southern" (meridionalis) and "provided with a peduncle" (pedunculata) respectively.

== Distribution and habitat ==
The variety hibbertioides is widespread in the far south-west of Western Australia where it grows in woodland and heath from Mount Lesueur to Dwellingup and inland to near Pingelly. Variety meridionalis grows in mallee and heath from near Hopetoun to near Esperance and var. pedunculata in woodland from near York to near Arthur River.

== Conservation status ==
Hibbertia hibbertioides and each of the three varieties is classified as "not threatened" by the Western Australian Government Department of Parks and Wildlife.

== See also ==
- List of Hibbertia species
