= Hibbertia trichocalyx =

Scientific classification
- Kingdom: Plantae
- Clade: Tracheophytes
- Clade: Angiosperms
- Clade: Eudicots
- Order: Dilleniales
- Family: Dilleniaceae
- Genus: Hibbertia
- Species: H. trichocalyx

Binomial name
- Hibbertia trichocalyx J.R.Wheeler

Species of flowering plant

Hibbertia trichocalyx is a species of flowering plant in the family Dilleniaceae and is endemic to the south coast of Western Australia. It is an erect, spreading shrub with oblong to elliptic leaves and yellow flowers with eleven stamens arranged around three glabrous carpels.

== Description ==
Hibbertia trichocalyx is an erect, spreading shrub that typically grows to a height of up to 60 cm (24 in) and has densely, softly-hairy branchlets. The leaves are sessile, oblong, elliptic or egg-shaped with the narrower end towards the base, mostly 5–12 mm (0.20–0.47 in) long and 1.5–4.5 mm (0.059–0.177 in) wide. The flowers are arranged singly in leaf axils or on the ends of short side-branches and are sessile with two or three cream-coloured to pale brown bracts 2.5–5 mm (0.098–0.197 in) long. The five sepals are joined at the base, the outer sepals 4.5–6.0 mm (0.18–0.24 in) long and 1.5–2.0 mm (0.059–0.079 in) wide, the inner sepals shorter but broader. The five petals are yellow, egg-shaped with the narrower end towards the base and 4–7 mm (0.16–0.28 in) long with a notch at the tip. There are eleven stamens joined in three groups of three with two free from the others, around three glabrous carpels that each contain a single ovule. Flowering occurs from September to November.

== Taxonomy ==
Hibbertia trichocalyx was first formally described in 2002 Judith R. Wheeler in the journal Nuytsia from specimens collected she collected in 1986 near Windy Harbour. The specific epithet (trichocalyx) means "hair-covering", referring to the hairy sepals.

== Distribution and habitat ==
This hibbertia grows in heath and woodland on sand dunes, winter-wet places and sandy hills on the south coast of Western Australia in the Jarrah Forest and Warren biogeographic regions of Western Australia.

== See also ==
- List of Hibbertia species
