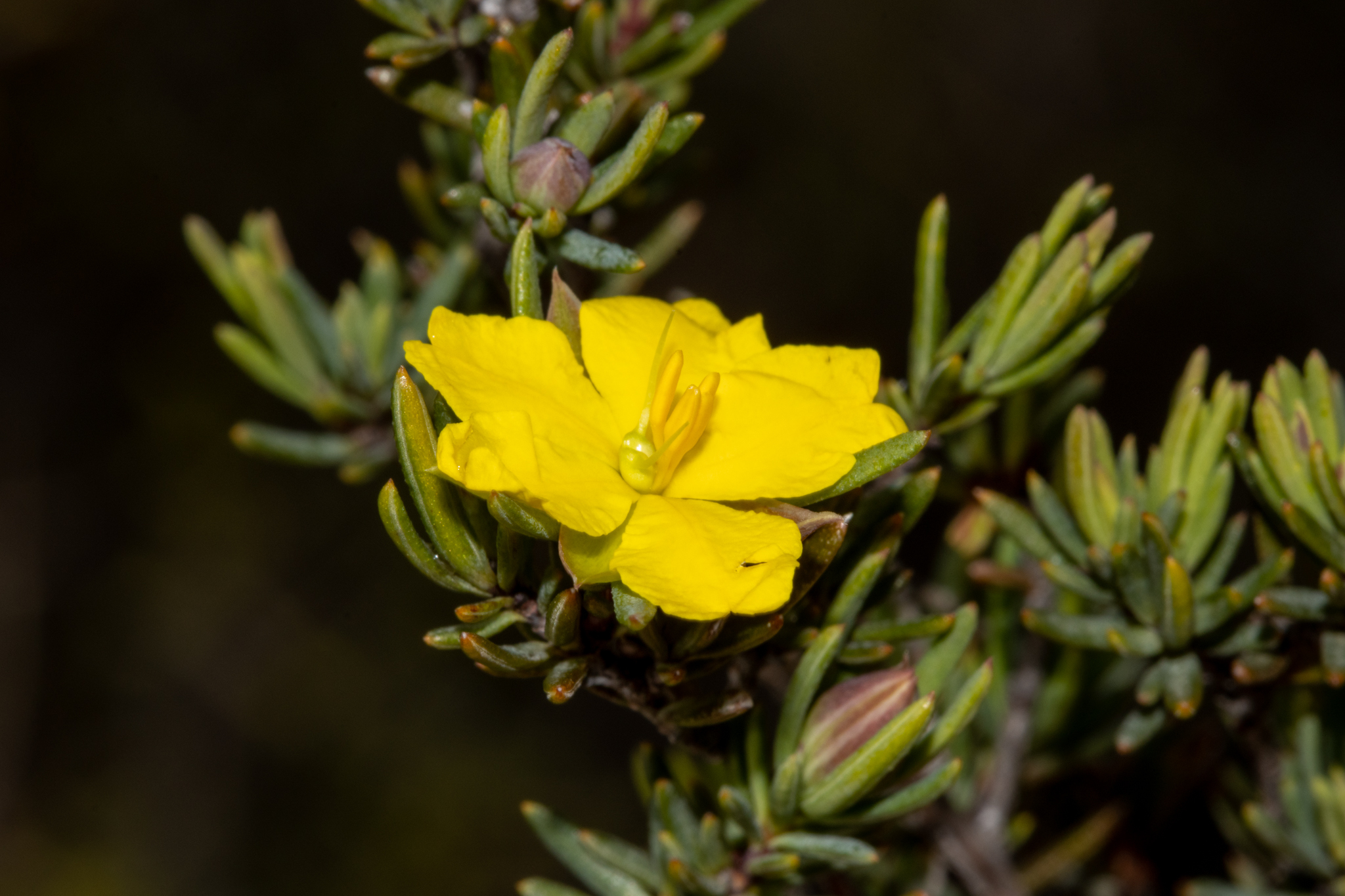

Scientific classification
- Kingdom: Plantae
- Clade: Tracheophytes
- Clade: Angiosperms
- Clade: Eudicots
- Order: Dilleniales
- Family: Dilleniaceae
- Genus: Hibbertia
- Species: H. oligantha

Binomial name
- Hibbertia oligantha J.R.Wheeler

= Hibbertia oligantha =

Species of flowering plant

Hibbertia oligantha is a species of flowering plant in the family Dilleniaceae and is endemic to the south-west of Western Australia. It is a shrub with linear leaves and yellow flowers with six to ten stamens on one side of two glabrous carpels.

== Description ==
Hibbertia oligantha is a shrub that typically grows to a height of up to 50 cm (20 in), its young branchlets softly-hairy. The leaves are arranged alternately, linear, mostly 3.5–15 mm (0.14–0.59 in) long, 0.6–1 mm (0.024–0.039 in) wide and more or less sessile. The flowers are arranged singly on the ends of short side shoots with a single bract about 1.5 mm (0.059 in) long at the base. The five sepals are elliptic, 4.5–6 mm (0.18–0.24 in) long and the inner sepals slightly broader that the outer sepals. The five petals are yellow, egg-shaped with the narrower end towards the base and 4–7.5 mm (0.16–0.30 in) long with a notch at the tip. There are six to ten stamens fused at the base and arranged on one side of the two glabrous carpels that each contain two ovules. Flowering mostly occurs from September to November.

== Taxonomy ==
Hibbertia oligantha was first formally described in 2004 by Judith R. Wheeler in the journal Nuytsia from specimens collected near Scaddan in 1984. The specific epithet (oligantha) means "few-flowered".

== Distribution and habitat ==
This hibbertia grows in heath in sandy soil between Peak Charles, Ravensthorpe and Esperance in the Esperance Plains and Mallee biogeographic regions of south-western Western Australia.

== Conservation status ==
Hibbertia oligantha is classified as "not threatened" by the Western Australian Government Department of Parks and Wildlife.

== See also ==
- List of Hibbertia species
