= Hibbertia carinata =

Conservation status
- Priority One — Poorly Known Taxa (DEC)

Scientific classification
- Kingdom: Plantae
- Clade: Tracheophytes
- Clade: Angiosperms
- Clade: Eudicots
- Order: Dilleniales
- Family: Dilleniaceae
- Genus: Hibbertia
- Species: H. carinata

Binomial name
- Hibbertia carinata J.R.Wheeler

Species of flowering plant

Hibbertia carinata is a species of flowering plant in the family Dilleniaceae and is endemic to the south-west of Western Australia. It is a shrub with crowded linear leaves and yellow flowers with nine to eleven stamens fused at their bases on one side of the two densely hairy carpels.

== Description ==
Hibbertia carinata is a shrub that typically grows to a height of 0.4 m (1 ft 4 in), its branchlets covered with tiny star-shaped hairs and ridged below the petioles. The leaves are linear, erect, almost cylindrical, 3.5–8 mm (0.14–0.31 in) long and 0.7–1.2 mm (0.028–0.047 in) wide and more or less sessile. The flowers are sessile and arranged singly on the ends of short side shoots, with linear, sharply-pointed, leaf-like bracts 3–4 mm (0.12–0.16 in) long. The five sepals are joined at the base, the outer sepals 4.5–6.5 mm (0.18–0.26 in) long, the inner ones broader. The five petals are yellow, egg-shaped with the narrower end towards the base and 4.5–6.5 mm (0.18–0.26 in) long with a deep notch at the tip. There are nine to eleven stamens, fused at the base and all on one side of the two densely hairy carpels that each contain four ovules. Flowering has been recorded in August and September.

== Taxonomy ==
Hibbertia carinata was first formally described in 2000 by Judith R. Wheeler in the journal Nuytsia from specimens collected at Hatter Hill in 1996. The specific epithet (carinata) means "keeled", referring to sepals.

== Distribution and habitat ==
This hibbertia has a scattered distribution through the southern Wheatbelt and a small parts of the Goldfields-Esperance region of Western Australia between Lake Grace in the west and Esperance in the east where it is found growing in well-drained gravelly sandy soils.

== Conservation status ==
Hibbertia carinata is classified as "Priority One" by the Government of Western Australia Department of Parks and Wildlife, meaning that it is known from only one or a few locations which are potentially at risk.

== See also ==
- List of Hibbertia species
