= Hibbertia hooglandii =

Scientific classification
- Kingdom: Plantae
- Clade: Tracheophytes
- Clade: Angiosperms
- Clade: Eudicots
- Order: Dilleniales
- Family: Dilleniaceae
- Genus: Hibbertia
- Species: H. hooglandii

Binomial name
- Hibbertia hooglandii J.R.Wheeler

Species of flowering plant

Hibbertia hooglandii is a species of flowering plant in the family Dilleniaceae and is endemic to the Kimberley region of Western Australia. It is a small, erect or spreading, multi-stemmed shrub with linear leaves and golden yellow flowers arranged singly in leaf axils, with seventeen to twenty-five stamens, all on one side of two densely hairy carpels.

== Description ==
Hibbertia hooglandii is an erect or spreading, multi-stemmed shrub that typically grows to a height of up to 40 cm (16 in) and has hairy reddish-brown branchlets when young. The leaves are linear, 13–55 mm (0.51–2.17 in) long and 0.3–0.5 mm (0.012–0.020 in) wide with the edges rolled under. The flowers are arranged singly in leaf axils on a glabrous peduncle 15–35 mm (0.59–1.38 in) long with a linear bract 2.5–7 mm (0.098–0.276 in) long at the base of the sepals. The five sepals are joined at the base, 5–8 mm (0.20–0.31 in) long. The five petals are golden yellow, egg-shaped with the narrower end towards the base, 5.5–11 mm (0.22–0.43 in) long and 5–10 mm (0.20–0.39 in) wide. There are seventeen to twenty-five stamens on one side of the two hairy carpels with six to thirteen staminodes in rows outside the stamens. Each of the carpels is more or less spherical and contains two ovules.

== Taxonomy ==
Hibbertia hooglandii was first formally described in 1989 by Judith R. Wheeler in the journal Nuytsia from specimens collected by John Stanley Beard on the Mitchell Plateau in 1979. The specific epithet (hooglandii) honours Ruurd Dirk Hoogland.

== Distribution and habitat ==
This species grows in woodland on rocky slopes, along creeks and on plateaus in the Kimberley region of Western Australia.

== Conservation status ==
Hibbertia hooglandii is classified as "not threatened" by the Western Australian Government Department of Parks and Wildlife.

== See also ==
- List of Hibbertia species
