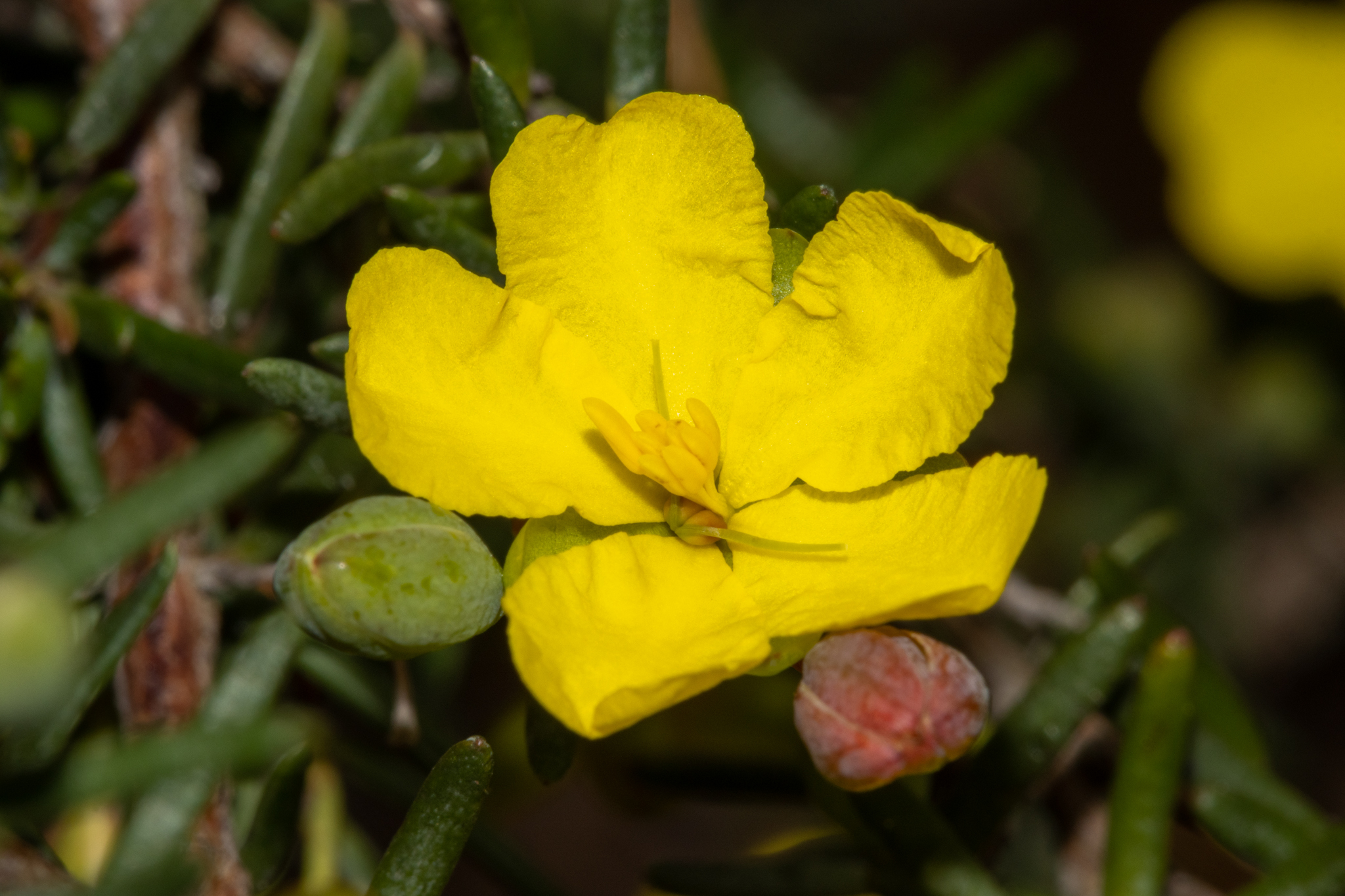
- Near Jerdacuttup

Scientific classification
- Kingdom: Plantae
- Clade: Tracheophytes
- Clade: Angiosperms
- Clade: Eudicots
- Order: Dilleniales
- Family: Dilleniaceae
- Genus: Hibbertia
- Species: H. psilocarpa

Binomial name
- Hibbertia psilocarpa J.R.Wheeler

= Hibbertia psilocarpa =

Species of flowering plant

Hibbertia psilocarpa is a species of flowering plant in the family Dilleniaceae and is endemic to the south-west of Western Australia. It is a shrub with spirally arranged, narrow oblong to linear leaves and yellow flowers usually with four to eight stamens, all on one side two glabrous carpels.

== Description ==
Hibbertia psilocarpa is a shrub that typically grows to a height of up to 1 m (3 ft 3 in), its branchlets more or less glabrous. The leaves are spirally arranged, narrowly oblong to linear, 3–11 mm (0.12–0.43 in) long, and 0.6–1.2 mm (0.024–0.047 in) wide on a petiole up to 0.8 mm (0.031 in) long, the edges of the leaves rolled under. The flowers are arranged singly in leaf axils or on the ends of short side shoots, sessile or on peduncles up to 10 mm (0.39 in) long with narrow egg-shaped bracts 0.5–1 mm (0.020–0.039 in) long at the base. The five sepals are elliptic, 4–7 mm (0.16–0.28 in) long and glabrous. The five petals are yellow, egg-shaped with the narrower end towards the base and 4.5–7.0 mm (0.18–0.28 in) long with a small notch at the tip. There are usually four to eight stamens fused at the base and arranged on one side of two glabrous carpels that each contain four to six ovules. Flowering mostly occurs from July to October.

== Taxonomy ==
Hibbertia psilocarpa was first formally described in 2004 by Judith R. Wheeler in the journal Nuytsia from specimens she collected on the Ravensthorpe to Hopetoun Road in 1986. The specific epithet (psilocarpa) means "smooth-fruited".

== Distribution and habitat ==
This hibbertia grows in a variety of habitats including heath and mallee from near Hyden, to the Fitzgerald River National Park, Ongerup and Israelite Bay.

== Conservation status ==
Hibbertia psilocarpa is classified as "not threatened" by the Western Australian Government Department of Biodiversity, Conservation and Attractions.

== See also ==
- List of Hibbertia species
