= Hibbertia charlesii =

Conservation status
- Priority Two — Poorly Known Taxa (DEC)

Scientific classification
- Kingdom: Plantae
- Clade: Tracheophytes
- Clade: Angiosperms
- Clade: Eudicots
- Order: Dilleniales
- Family: Dilleniaceae
- Genus: Hibbertia
- Species: H. charlesii

Binomial name
- Hibbertia charlesii J.R.Wheeler

Species of flowering plant

Hibbertia charlesii is a species of flowering plant in the family Dilleniaceae and is endemic to a restricted part of the south-west of Western Australia. It is a spreading shrub with crowded, upward-pointing linear leaves and golden yellow flowers with five stamens fused at their bases and up to twenty staminodes, all on one side of two densely hairy carpels.

== Description ==
Hibbertia charlesii is a spreading shrub that typically grows to a height of up to 1 m (3 ft 3 in) and has branchlets densely covered with woolly, grey or white hairs when young. The leaves are crowded, upward-pointing, linear, 6–16 mm (0.24–0.63 in) long and 1–1.5 mm (0.039–0.059 in) wide on a petiole 0.5–2 mm (0.020–0.079 in) long. The flowers are sessile and arranged singly on the ends of short side shoots, with leaf-like bracts hidden among woolly hairs. The five sepals are joined at the base, the outer sepals 7–9 mm (0.28–0.35 in) long, the inner ones broader. The five petals are golden yellow, egg-shaped with the narrower end towards the base and 6–9 mm (0.24–0.35 in) long with a deep notch at the tip. There are five stamens, fused at the base and five to twenty staminodes, all on one side of the two densely hairy carpels that each contain four ovules. Flowering has been recorded in October and November.

== Taxonomy ==
Hibbertia charlesii was first formally described in 2000 by Judith R. Wheeler in the journal Nuytsia from specimens collected by John Stanley Beard in Peak Charles National Park in 1964. The specific epithet (charlesii) refers to Peak Charles, the only place where this species has been collected.

== Distribution and habitat ==
This species has only been recorded from Peak Charles where it grows on granite slopes.

== Conservation status ==
Hibbertia charlesii is classified as "Priority Two" by the Western Australian Government Department of Parks and Wildlife meaning that it is poorly known and from only one or a few locations.

== See also ==
- List of Hibbertia species
