= Hibbertia acrotrichion =

Conservation status
- Priority Two — Poorly Known Taxa (DEC)

Scientific classification
- Kingdom: Plantae
- Clade: Tracheophytes
- Clade: Angiosperms
- Clade: Eudicots
- Order: Dilleniales
- Family: Dilleniaceae
- Genus: Hibbertia
- Species: H. acrotrichion

Binomial name
- Hibbertia acrotrichion J.R.Wheeler

Species of flowering plant

Hibbertia acrotrichion is a species of flowering plant in the family Dilleniaceae and is endemic to a restricted area of Western Australia. It is a small, erect shrub with linear, cylindrical leaves and yellow flowers arranged singly in leaf axils with eleven stamens arranged in groups.

== Description ==
Hibbertia acrotrichion is an erect shrub that typically grows to a height of up to 30 cm (12 in) with hairy new growth. The leaves are crowded and spirally arranged along short side shoots, linear and more or less cylindrical, 4–7 mm (0.16–0.28 in) long and 0.5–0.7 mm (0.020–0.028 in) wide. The flowers are arranged singly in leaf axils on short side shoots, 10–14 mm (0.39–0.55 in) wide with up to three broadly egg-shaped bracts 1–3 mm (0.039–0.118 in) long. The five sepals are dark green, broadly elliptic, the outer sepals 3.5–4.5 mm (0.14–0.18 in) long and the inner sepals 4–6 mm (0.16–0.24 in) long. The five petals are yellow, 6–7 mm (0.24–0.28 in) long and egg-shaped with the narrower end towards the base. The eleven stamens are arranged in three groups of three and two single stamens. The three carpels are glabrous and there is one ovule per carpel. Flowering has been recorded in August and September.

== Taxonomy ==
Hibbertia acrotrichion was first formally described in 2004 by Judith R. Wheeler in the journal Nuytsia from specimens she collected in the Fitzgerald River National Park in 2001. The specific epithet (acrotrichion) is derived from Greek and means "small hairs at the tip", referring to the small tuft of hairs at the tip of otherwise glabrous leaves.

== Distribution and habitat ==
This hibbertia grows in sandy soil in heath or mallee heath between Bremer Bay and Ravensthorpe in the Esperance Plains biogeographic region in the south-west of Western Australia.

== Conservation status ==
Hibbertia acrotrichion is classified as "Priority Two" by the Western Australian Government Department of Parks and Wildlife meaning that it is poorly known and from only one or a few locations.

== See also ==
- List of Hibbertia species
