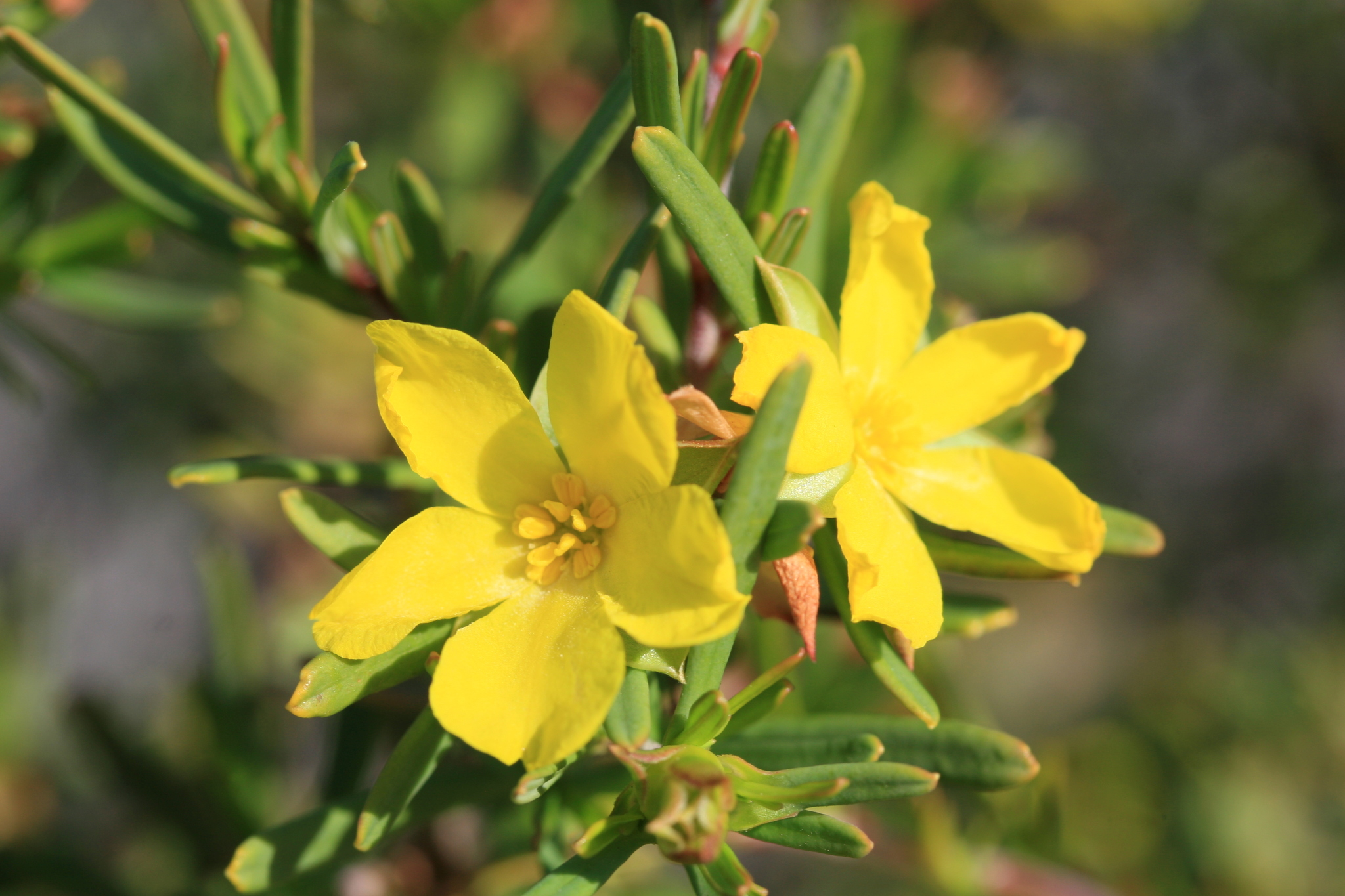

Scientific classification
- Kingdom: Plantae
- Clade: Tracheophytes
- Clade: Angiosperms
- Clade: Eudicots
- Order: Dilleniales
- Family: Dilleniaceae
- Genus: Hibbertia
- Species: H. glabrisepala

Binomial name
- Hibbertia glabrisepala J.R.Wheeler

= Hibbertia glabrisepala =

Species of flowering plant

Hibbertia glabrisepala is a species of flowering plant in the family Dilleniaceae and is endemic to the south-west of Western Australia. It is an erect to sprawling shrub with linear to narrow oblong leaves and bright yellow flowers borne on the ends of short side shoots, with fifteen stamens in groups surrounding the five carpels.

== Description ==
Hibbertia glabrisepala is an erect to sprawling shrub that typically grows to a height of 0.45–1.0 m (1 ft 6 in – 3 ft 3 in) with mostly glabrous foliage. The leaves are linear to narrow oblong, 9–20 mm (0.35–0.79 in) long and 1–3 mm (0.039–0.118 in) wide with the edges turned downwards. The flowers are 15–20 mm (0.59–0.79 in) wide, borne singly or in small groups on the ends of short side shoots and are sessile with two or three more or less round bracts 3–5 mm (0.12–0.20 in) long. The five sepals are joined at the base, egg-shaped to elliptic, 6–10.5 mm (0.24–0.41 in) long and more or less glabrous. The five petals are bright yellow, egg-shaped with the narrower end towards the base, 6–11 mm (0.24–0.43 in) long with a shallow notch at the tip. There are fifteen stamens arranged in three groups around the five carpels, each carpel containing a single ovule. Flowering occurs from May to October.

== Taxonomy ==
Hibbertia glabrisepala was first formally described in 2002 by Judy Wheeler in the journal Nuytsia from specimens she collected near Kalbarri in 1984. The specific epithet (glabrisepala) refers to the glabrous sepals.

== Distribution and habitat ==
This hibbertia grows in sandy soil in heath and mallee in the Avon Wheatbelt, Geraldton Sandplains and Yalgoo biogeographic regions of south-western Western Australia.

== Conservation status ==
Hibbertia glabrisepala is classified as "not threatened" by the Government of Western Australia Department of Parks and Wildlife.

== See also ==
- List of Hibbertia species
