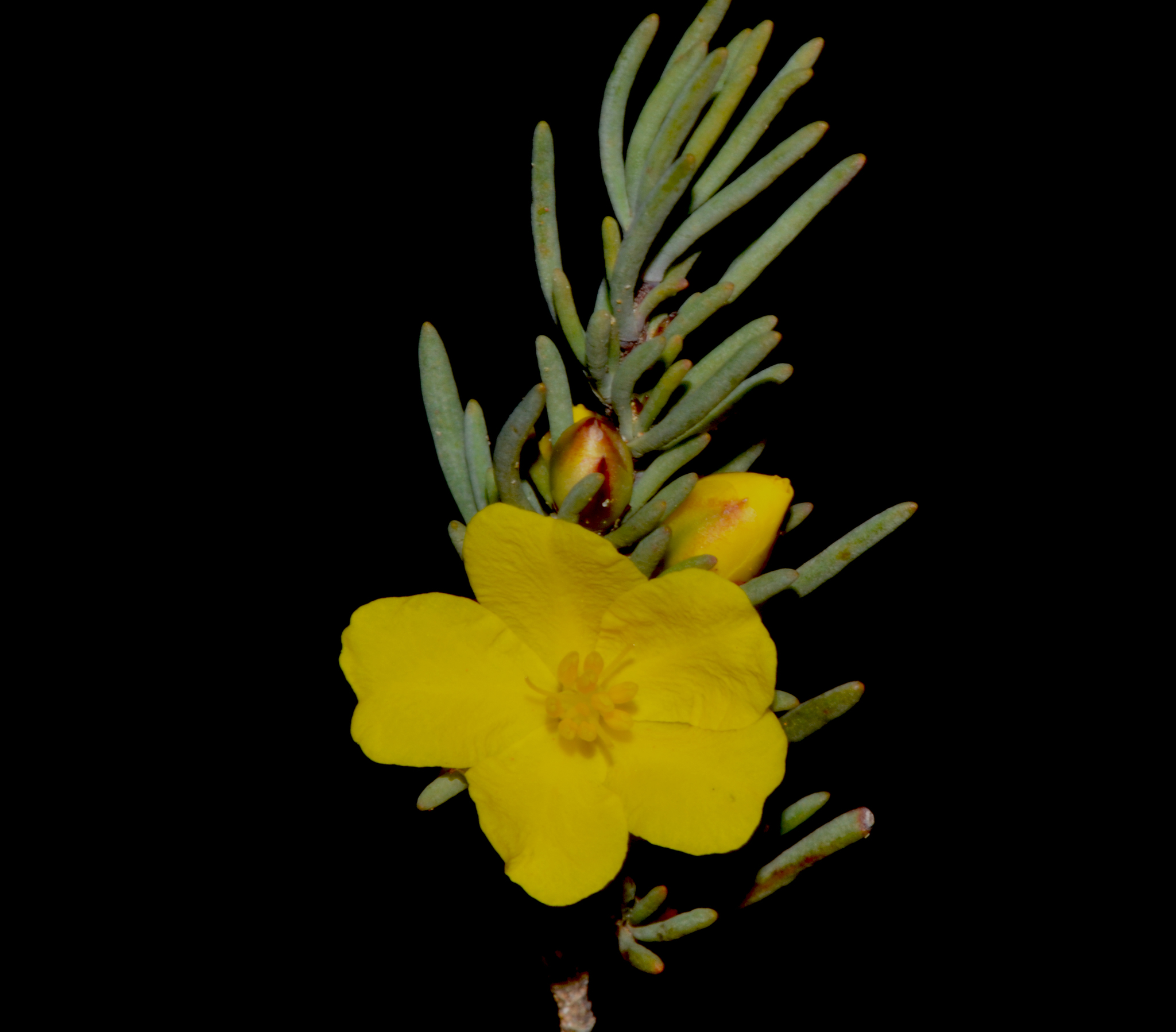

Scientific classification
- Kingdom: Plantae
- Clade: Embryophytes
- Clade: Tracheophytes
- Clade: Spermatophytes
- Clade: Angiosperms
- Clade: Eudicots
- Order: Dilleniales
- Family: Dilleniaceae
- Genus: Hibbertia
- Species: H. hemignosta

Binomial name
- Hibbertia hemignosta (Steud.) J.R.Wheeler

Synonyms
- List: Hibbertia teretifolia (Turcz.) F.Muell. p.p.; Hibbertia teretifolia (Turcz.) F.Muell. var. teretifolia p.p.; Pleurandra hemignosta Steud.; Candollea enervia auct. non (DC.) Druce: Druce, G.C. (1917); Candollea teretifolia auct. non Turcz.: Bentham, G. (30 May 1863); Hibbertia enervia auct. non (DC.) Hoogland: Hoogland, R.D. (1974) p.p.; Pleurandra enervia auct. non DC.: Steudel, E.G. von in Lehmann, J.G.C. (ed.) (1845)

= Hibbertia hemignosta =

Species of flowering plant

Hibbertia hemignosta is a species of flowering plant in the family Dilleniaceae and is endemic to the south-west of Western Australia. It is a prostrate to erect shrub that typically grows to a height of 30–50 cm (12–20 in). It was first formally described in 1845 by Ernst Gottlieb von Steudel who gave it the name Pleurandra hemignosta in Lehmann's Plantae Preissianae. In 2002, Judy Wheeler changed the name to Hibbertia hemignosta in Journal of the Adelaide Botanic Gardens. The specific epithet (hemignosta) means "half-known", but the reason for that name was not given. This hibbertia grows on sandplains, flats and slopes in the Avon Wheatbelt, Coolgardie, Esperance Plains, Jarrah Forest, Mallee, Swan Coastal Plain and Warren biogeographic regions in the south-west of Western Australia.

Hibbertia hemignosta is classified as "not threatened" by the Government of Western Australia Department of Parks and Wildlife.

== See also ==
- List of Hibbertia species
