= Hibbertia fitzgeraldensis =

Conservation status
- Priority Three — Poorly Known Taxa (DEC)

Scientific classification
- Kingdom: Plantae
- Clade: Tracheophytes
- Clade: Angiosperms
- Clade: Eudicots
- Order: Dilleniales
- Family: Dilleniaceae
- Genus: Hibbertia
- Species: H. fitzgeraldensis

Binomial name
- Hibbertia fitzgeraldensis J.R.Wheeler

Species of flowering plant

Hibbertia fitzgeraldensis is a species of flowering plant in the family Dilleniaceae and is endemic to a restricted area in the south-west of Western Australia. It is a sprawling shrub with sometimes clustered linear leaves and yellow flowers borne on the ends of short side shoots, with eleven stamens in groups surrounding the three carpels.

== Description ==
Hibbertia fitzgeraldensis is a sprawling shrub that typically grows to a height of up to 30 cm (12 in) with its branchlets covered with fine, soft hairs. The leaves are sometimes clustered, linear, 7–30 mm (0.28–1.18 in) long, 0.5–3.0 mm (0.020–0.118 in) wide with the edges turned downwards. The flowers are borne on short side shoots and are sessile with up to three narrow triangular bracts 3.5–5.5 mm (0.14–0.22 in) long. The five sepals are joined at the base narrow elliptic, the outer sepals 5.5–7.0 mm (0.22–0.28 in) long and the inner ones slightly shorter but broader. The five petals are yellow, egg-shaped with the narrower end towards the base, 4.5–7 mm (0.18–0.28 in) long with a shallow notch at the tip. There are eleven stamens with nine in groups of three, around the three carpels, each carpel containing a single ovule. Flowering occurs in September and October.

== Taxonomy ==
Hibbertia fitzgeraldensis was first formally described in 2002 by Judy Wheeler in the journal Nuytsia from specimens she collected on West Mount Barren in 1986. The specific epithet (fitzgeraldensis) is a reference to the Fitzgerald River National Park where this species occurs.

== Distribution and habitat ==
This hibbertia grows in heath, often on rocky slopes or hills in the Fitzgerald River National Park in the south-west of Western Australia.

== Conservation status ==
Hibbertia fitzgeraldensis is classified as "Priority Three" by the Government of Western Australia Department of Parks and Wildlife meaning that it is poorly known and known from only a few locations but is not under imminent threat.

== See also ==
- List of Hibbertia species
