= Hibbertia pachyphylla =

Scientific classification
- Kingdom: Plantae
- Clade: Tracheophytes
- Clade: Angiosperms
- Clade: Eudicots
- Order: Dilleniales
- Family: Dilleniaceae
- Genus: Hibbertia
- Species: H. pachyphylla

Binomial name
- Hibbertia pachyphylla J.R.Wheeler

Species of flowering plant

Hibbertia pachyphylla is a species of flowering plant in the family Dilleniaceae and is endemic to Western Australia. It is a shrub with thick, oblong leaves and yellow flowers with five stamens in a bundle on one side of two hairy carpels.

== Description ==
Hibbertia pachyphylla is a shrub that typically grows to a height of up to 50 cm (20 in), its young branchlets softly-hairy. The leaves are arranged spirally, thick, oblong, mostly 2–6 mm (0.079–0.236 in) long, 1.5–2.2 mm (0.059–0.087 in) wide and more or less sessile. The flowers are arranged singly on the ends of short side shoots with hairy, narrow triangular bracts 1–3 mm (0.039–0.118 in) long at the base. The five sepals are elliptic, 5–6 mm (0.20–0.24 in) long and the outer sepals about 3 mm (0.12 in) wide and the inner ones 4–5 mm (0.16–0.20 in) wide. The five petals are yellow, egg-shaped with the narrower end towards the base and 6–9 mm (0.24–0.35 in) long with a deep notch at the tip. There are five stamens fused at the base on one side of two hairy carpels that each contain two ovules. Flowering occurs from September to November.

== Taxonomy ==
Hibbertia pachyphylla was first formally described in 2004 by Judith R. Wheeler in the journal Nuytsia from specimens collected by E.C. Nelson near the road between Hyden and Norseman in 1973. The specific epithet (pachyphylla) means "thick-leaved".

== Distribution and habitat ==
This hibbertia grows in mallee woodland and scrub on sandy soil in scattered locations in the Coolgardie and Mallee biogeographic regions of Western Australia.

== Conservation status ==
Hibbertia pachyphylla is classified as "not threatened" by the Western Australian Government Department of Parks and Wildlife.

== See also ==
- List of Hibbertia species
