= Hibbertia lepidocalyx =

Scientific classification
- Kingdom: Plantae
- Clade: Tracheophytes
- Clade: Angiosperms
- Clade: Eudicots
- Order: Dilleniales
- Family: Dilleniaceae
- Genus: Hibbertia
- Species: H. lepidocalyx

Binomial name
- Hibbertia lepidocalyx J.R.Wheeler

Species of flowering plant

Hibbertia lepidocalyx is a species of flowering plant in the family Dilleniaceae and is endemic to Western Australia. It is a shrub with thick, linear, cylindrical leaves and yellow flowers with nine or ten stamens in a single group on one side of the two carpels.

== Description ==
Hibbertia lepidocalyx is a shrub that typically grows to a height of up to 75 cm (30 in) and has glabrous branchlets, at least when they are mature. The leaves are spirally arranged, sometimes crowded, thick, linear and cylindrical, 6–20 mm (0.24–0.79 in) long and 1.0–1.5 mm (0.039–0.059 in) wide on a petiole 0.5–1.0 mm (0.020–0.039 in) long. The flowers are arranged singly in leaf axils on a peduncle 4–15 mm (0.16–0.59 in) long with bracts up to 3.2 mm (0.13 in) long. The flowers are 8–25 mm (0.31–0.98 in) in diameter with five sepals joined at the base, 4–7 mm (0.16–0.28 in) long but varying in length. The five petals are yellow, egg-shaped with the narrower end towards the base and 5–12 mm (0.20–0.47 in) long with a deep notch at the tip. There are nine or ten stamens fused at the base, on one side of the two scaly carpels that each contain three to six ovules.

== Taxonomy ==
Hibbertia lepidocalyx was first formally described in 2002 Judith R. Wheeler in the journal Nuytsia from specimens collected near Lake King in 1968. The specific epithet (lepidocalyx) means "scaly sepals".

In the same journal, Wheeler described two subspecies and the names are accepted by the Australian Plant Census:

- Hibbertia lepidocalyx J.R.Wheeler subsp. lepidocalyx has smooth leaves and flowers 8–15 mm (0.31–0.59 in) wide from August to September;
- Hibbertia lepidocalyx subsp. tuberculata J.R.Wheeler has warty leaves and flowers 15–25 mm (0.59–0.98 in) wide in July.

The subspecies epithet tuberculata mean refers to the wart-like lumps on the upper leaf surface.

== Distribution and habitat ==
Subspecies lepidocalyx grows in mallee and shrubland in the Mallee biogeographic region, and subspecies tuberculata is found in woodland and heath but is only known from two populations in the Coolgardie bioregion.

== Conservation status ==
Hibbertia lepidocalyx and subspecies lepidocalyx are classified as "not threatened" but susp. tuberculata is classified as "Priority Three" by the Government of Western Australia Department of Parks and Wildlife meaning that it is poorly known and known from only a few locations but is not under imminent threat.

== See also ==
- List of Hibbertia species
