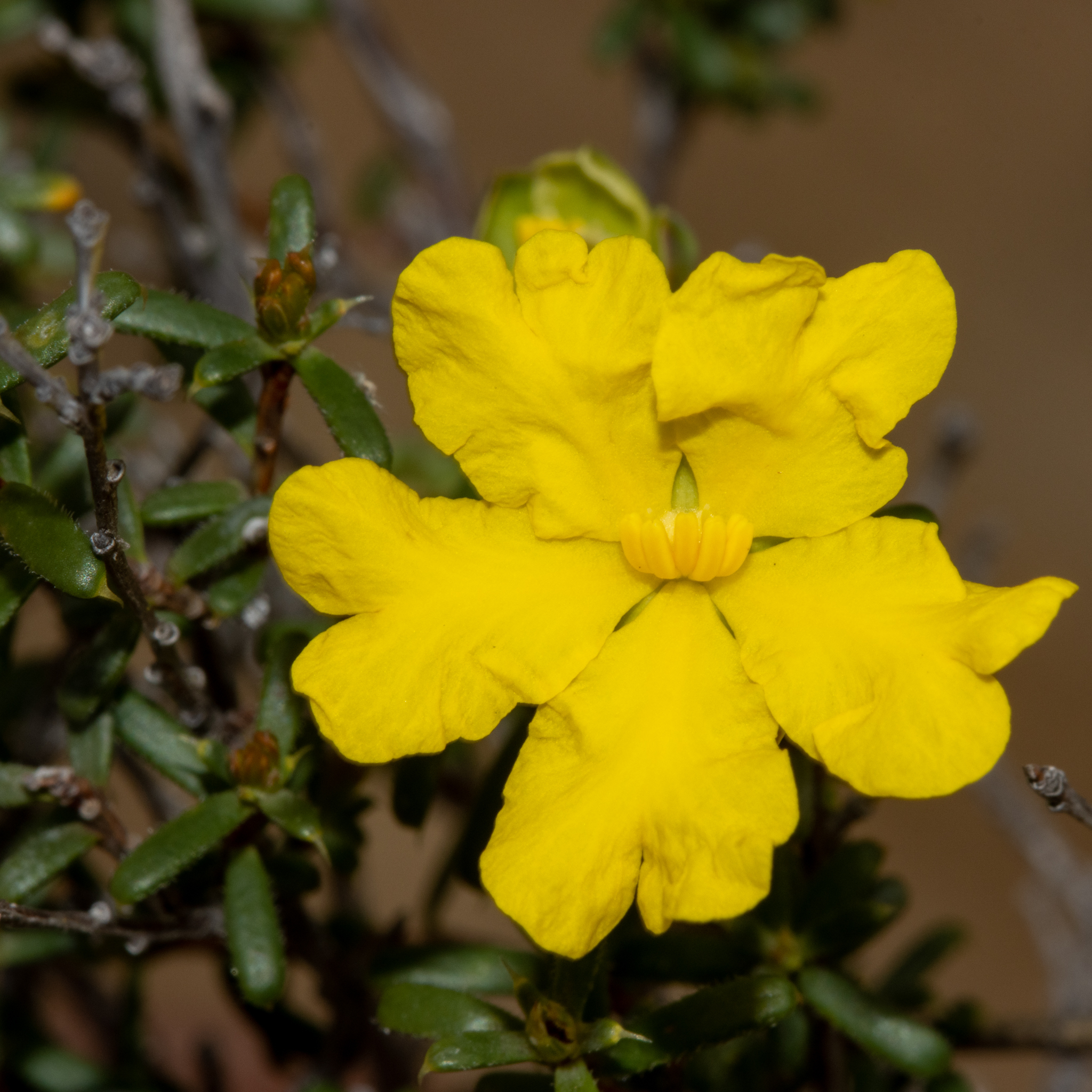

Scientific classification
- Kingdom: Plantae
- Clade: Tracheophytes
- Clade: Angiosperms
- Clade: Eudicots
- Order: Dilleniales
- Family: Dilleniaceae
- Genus: Hibbertia
- Species: H. ancistrophylla

Binomial name
- Hibbertia ancistrophylla J.R.Wheeler

= Hibbertia ancistrophylla =

Species of flowering plant

Hibbertia ancistrophylla is a species of flowering plant in the family Dilleniaceae and is endemic to the south-west of Western Australia. It is a shrub with sessile, linear leaves and bright yellow flowers arranged singly in leaf axils with eight to eleven stamens fused at their bases on one side of the carpels.

== Description ==
Hibbertia ancistrophylla is a shrub that typically grows to a height of 0.3–0.6 m (1 ft 0 in – 2 ft 0 in) and has glabrous branchlets. Its leaves are linear, 2–8 mm (0.079–0.315 in) long and 0.7–1 mm (0.028–0.039 in) wide and sessile with a short curved point on the tip. The flowers are arranged on the ends of short side shoots and are 7–12 mm (0.28–0.47 in) in diameter, and sessile or on a peduncle up to 3 mm (0.12 in) long. There are up to five bracts 1–2.5 mm (0.039–0.098 in) long below each flower. The five sepals are 3.5–5.5 mm (0.14–0.22 in) long, the outer sepals 2–3 mm (0.079–0.118 in) wide and the inner ones slightly broader. The five petals are bright yellow, egg-shaped with the narrower end towards the base and 5–8 mm (0.20–0.31 in) long with a notch at the tip. There are eight to eleven stamens, fused at the base and on one side of the two carpels that each contain four ovules. Flowering occurs from June to October.

== Taxonomy ==
Hibbertia ancistrophylla was first formally described in 2002 by Judith R. Wheeler in the journal Nuytsia from specimens she collected near Mollerin in 1989. The specific epithet (ancistrophylla) means "fish-hook leaf", referring to the hooked leaf tip.

== Distribution and habitat ==
This species occurs between Wubin, Paynes Find, Hyden and Coolgardie in the Avon Wheatbelt, Coolgardie, Mallee and Murchison biogeographic regions in the south-west of Western Australia, growing in open shrubland and heath.

== Conservation status ==
Hibbertia ancistrophylla is classified as "not threatened" by the Western Australian Government Department of Parks and Wildlife

== See also ==
- List of Hibbertia species
