= Judy Wheeler =

Australian botanist

Judith Roderick Wheeler (born 1944 in Cardiff, Wales) is an Australian herbarium botanist. After receiving an honours degree in botanical science, she was employed at the State Herbarium of South Australia, before moving to Western Australia's Murdoch University and later the West Australian Herbarium. Wheeler was the leading contributor to the two volume Flora of the South West (UWAP).

== Life ==
Judith Roderick Wheeler was born in Cardiff, Wales in 1944. She is an herbarium botanist in Australia. She studied at King’s College, Newcastle on Tyne, (now Newcastle University) and the University of Durham. After receiving an honours degree in botanical science, she was employed at the State Herbarium of South Australia, before moving to Western Australia's Murdoch University and later the West Australian Herbarium. Wheeler was the leading contributor to the two volume Flora of the South West (UWAP).

Judy Wheeler's name is abbreviated to J.R.Wheeler when cited as the author of a plant descriptions.

== Publications ==
- Wheeler, J. R. (Judith Roderick); Western Australian Herbarium; Western Australian Herbarium; Rye, B; Wheeler, J; Koch, B; Wilson, A (1992), Flora of the Kimberley Region, Western Australian Herbarium, Dept. of Conservation and Land Management, ISBN 978-0-7309-5221-3
- Wheeler, Judy; Marchant, N. G. (Neville Graeme); Lewington, Margaret; Graham, Lorraine; Australian Biological Resources Study; Western Australian Herbarium; Marchant, Neville (2002), Flora of the South West : Bunbury – Augusta – Denmark, Australian Biological Resources Study; [London : Eurospan] [distributor], ISBN 978-0-642-56815-1
