= Diospyros cambodiana =

Scientific classification
- Kingdom: Plantae
- Clade: Tracheophytes
- Clade: Angiosperms
- Clade: Eudicots
- Clade: Asterids
- Order: Ericales
- Family: Ebenaceae
- Genus: Diospyros
- Species: D. cambodiana

Binomial name
- Diospyros cambodiana Lecomte

Species of flowering plant

Diospyros cambodiana is a tree in the Ebenaceae family, endemic to the Mekong basin, Cambodia. It grows some 15-20m tall in flooded/swamp forest. One of its vernacular names ('ach kânndaô) derives from the perceived likeness of its flowers to mouse droppings. The plant is used for construction, craftwork, firewood and medicine.

== Habitat ==
It is one of the 2 main tree species of the swamp forests that line the rivers and lake of Tonlé Sap region, along with Barringtonia acutangula. The swamp forests at Tonlé Sap occur as a mosaic of stands of large trees and open areas with floating aquatic vegetation, a once-common habitat along rivers in Cambodia, now largely restricted to Tonlé Sap and small areas along the Mekong. The two main trees typically grow with various woody lianas (such as Combretum trifoliatum, Breynia vitis-idaea, Tetracera sarmentosa, and Senegalia thailandica.

== Ecology ==
The tree is a highly preferred nesting site for the grey-headed fish eagle (Haliaeetus ichthyaetus).

== Vernacular names ==
The species is known as 'ach kânndaô ("droppings of mice", referring to the shape of the flowers) or ach kândor, and phtuôl, ptol, or phtuel (Khmer, which at present [2021] still has no accepted roman transliteration).

== Uses ==
The tree is a preferred source of wood for construction in the Tonlé Sap region. The wood is also used to make toys and models. In the early 20th Century, the species was widely exploited for charcoal-making, and it became rare on the Tonlé Sap floodplain. Even though rare, it is still favoured for firewood collection.

The fruit is eaten to treat diarrhoea. Due to its bitterness it is usually eaten with the fermented fish paste prahok.

== History ==
Diospyros cambodiana was first described by the French botanist Paul Henri Lecomte (1856–1934), in the Bulletin du Muséum National d'Histoire Naturelle, Paris in 1929.
