= Senegalia thailandica =

Scientific classification
- Kingdom: Plantae
- Clade: Embryophytes
- Clade: Tracheophytes
- Clade: Spermatophytes
- Clade: Angiosperms
- Clade: Eudicots
- Clade: Rosids
- Order: Fabales
- Family: Fabaceae
- Subfamily: Caesalpinioideae
- Clade: Mimosoid clade
- Genus: Senegalia
- Species: S. thailandica

Binomial name
- Senegalia thailandica (I.C.Nielsen) Maslin, Seigler & Ebinger, Blumea 58(1): 42 (2013)

Synonyms
- Acacia thailandica I.C.Nielsen

Species of legume

Senegalia thailandica is a species of climbing or sprawling shrub in the family Fabaceae.

The liana or shrub has stout spiny stems, and the pods of the liana are slightly inflated and tightly curled, unlike many in the genus.

It is found in Thailand and Cambodia, where it grows in permanently or seasonally freshwater-flooded forests. It is endemic to the Mekong Basin, and may occur in its delta in Vietnam. It grows in the swamp forests and scrublands of the floodplains of Tonle Sap in central Cambodia, often accompanying the canopy trees of Barringtonia acutangula and Diospyros cambodiana. It is found in a riverine forest on the Sangkae River to the northwest of Tonle Sap, as part of a diverse tall evergreen forest community.

In Khmer the plant is known as (voër) ba:y dämnoëb, voër refers to lianas, ba:y dämnoëb="sticky rice", referring to the sticky thorns. The young leaves are edible, usually served in salads, while the wood is used as firewood.
