= Combretum trifoliatum =

Scientific classification
- Kingdom: Plantae
- Clade: Embryophytes
- Clade: Tracheophytes
- Clade: Angiosperms
- Clade: Eudicots
- Clade: Rosids
- Order: Myrtales
- Family: Combretaceae
- Genus: Combretum
- Species: C. trifoliatum

Binomial name
- Combretum trifoliatum Vent.

Synonyms
- Cacoucia lucida (Blume) Hassk.; Cacoucia trifoliata (Vent.) DC.; Combretum bellum Steud.; Combretum lucidum Blume; Combretum subalternans Wall.; Combretum undulatum Wall.; Embryogonia lucida (Blume) Blume; Terminalia lancifolia Griff.

Species of plant

Combretum trifoliatum is a vine (rarely a shrub) of the family Combretaceae. It is found from Myanmar across Southeast Asia and Wallacea to New Guinea and Australia. It grows in wet places, including where it can be submerged for four months a year by floodwaters. It is unusual in retaining its photosynthesizing leaves when flooded. Parts of the plant are used in traditional medicine.

== Description ==
The vine/climber (or shrub) can have a stem diameter up to 4 cm, described as "stout woody liana". Leaves are some 8.5–16 x 4–6.5 cm in size, with petioles some 03–0.5 cm in length. Domatia are tufts of hair, if present. On plagiotropic (horizontal or oblique) shoots the leaves are opposite in arrangement, but on orthotropic (vertical) shoots there is whorled arrangement. Both young shoots and vegetative buds are covered in dark brown hairs. The flowers have a hypanthium (calyx tube) some 1.3 mm long, calyx lobes some 0.8 mm in length, 1.1 mm long petals, a disc surrounding base of style, 10 stamens, 4.5 mm long style, small stigma and the flowers grow terminally. Fruit is more or less sessile, some 35–40 x 10–12mm in size, 5 longitudinal ribs, transverse section is markedly lobed, the seeds are some 15–20 mm in length, embryos are more or less five-winged and some 15–20 mm in length. The vine maintains its photosynthesizing leaves during flooding, unlike many others in its habitats.

== Distribution ==
The species is found in Southeast Asia, Wallacea and Sahul/greater Australian continent. It grows in the following countries and regions: Australia (only known from the Weipa area in Cape York, Queensland); Papua New Guinea (mainland); Indonesia (Papua (province), Nusa Tenggara, Sulawesi, Kalimantan, Jawa, Sumatera); Timor Leste; Malaysia (Sabah, Sarawak, Peninsular Malaysia); Brunei Darussalam; Thailand; Cambodia; Vietnam; Laos; and Myanmar.

== Habitat ==
The plant grows in secondary formations in Southeast Asia, quite common in wet places. In the Tonlé Sap floodplains, Combretum trifoliatum occurs frequently in the swamp forests dominated by Barringtonia acutangula and Diospyros cambodiana and in scrublands, where it can often assume a shrub form. Along the Mekong at the Pha Taem National Park, the species grows as an "extreme rheophyte", surviving up to 4 months of submergence in flood waters. They grow as low clumping shrubs on sandy soils, including those in rock crevices. They are dispersed in the running water.

== Vernacular names ==
In Khmer Combretum trifoliatum is known as (voër) trâhs', or trâs. In the Vientiane region of Laos, the plant is called ben nám. In Vietnamese, it is called Chưn bầu ba lá or Trâm bầu ba lá.

== Uses ==
The species is used in traditional medicine in Cambodia: the sap (obtained by splitting the stalk) is drunk to cure dysentery; paste of the roasted fruit is mixed with palm sugar to make balls which are then chewed for oral health; the root is part of a remedy used to treat women with gonorrhoea. The stem is used in Laos.

== History ==
Étienne Pierre Ventenat (1757-1808), French botanist described the species in his Choix de Plantes, dont la Plupart sont Cultivees dans le Jardin de Cels ..., which published over the years 1803 to 1808, with the entry for Combretum trifoliatum in the 1804 publication.
