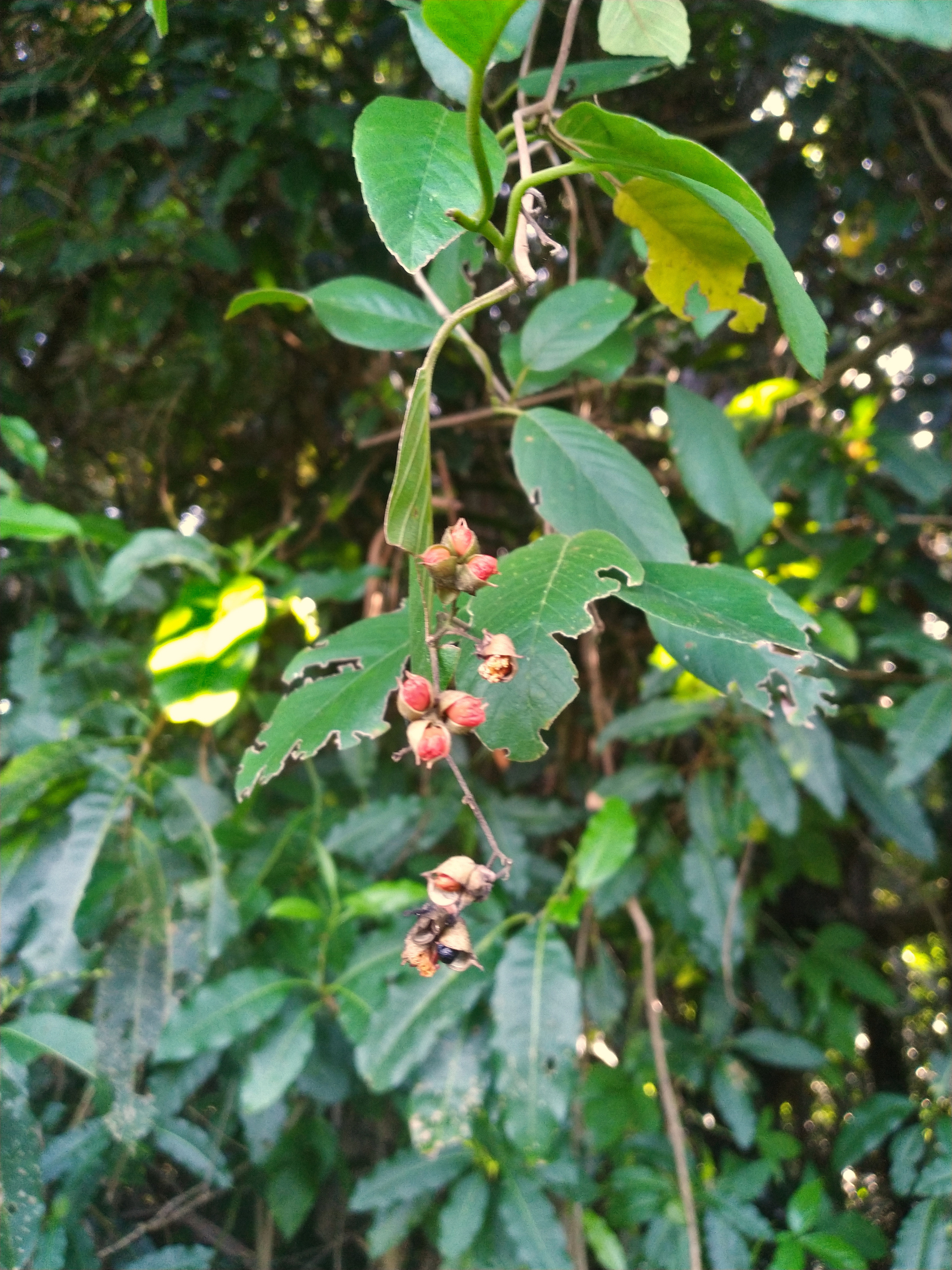
- Vine with dehiscing fruit

Conservation status
- Least Concern (NCA)

Scientific classification
- Kingdom: Plantae
- Clade: Tracheophytes
- Clade: Angiosperms
- Clade: Eudicots
- Order: Dilleniales
- Family: Dilleniaceae
- Genus: Tetracera
- Species: T. nordtiana

Binomial name
- Tetracera nordtiana F.Muell.

= Tetracera nordtiana =

Small-leaved fire vine

Species of flowering plant

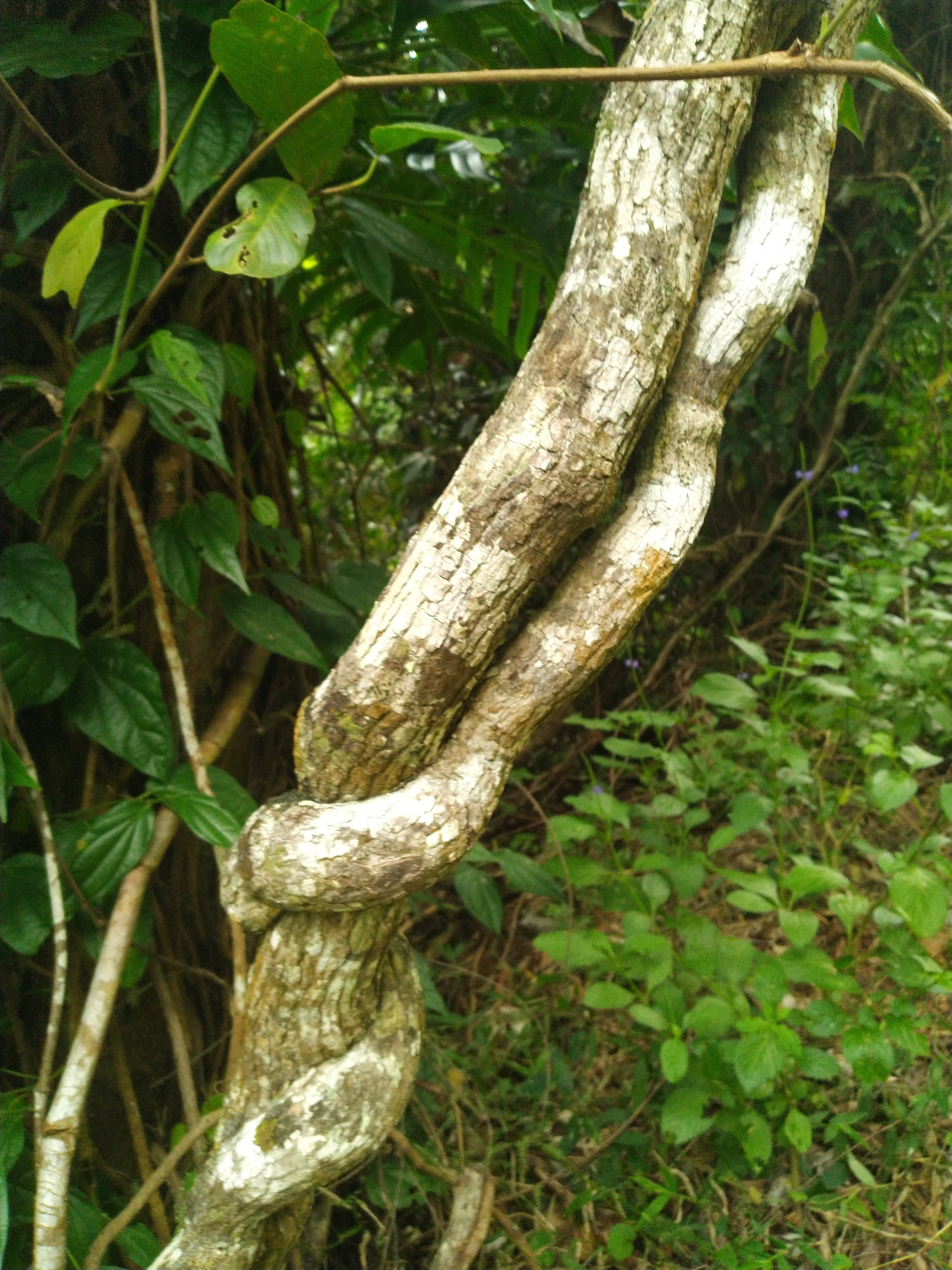
Vine stem

Tetracera nordtiana, commonly known as small-leaved fire vine, is a climbing plant in the family Dilleniaceae which occurs from eastern Indonesia to the Australian state of Queensland. It was first described in 1865 and has a conservation status of least concern.

== Description ==
Tetracera nordtiana is a twining vine, or (rarely) a scandent shrub, with stem diameters up to 5 cm (2.0 in) and branches to 10 m (33 ft) long. Most parts of the plant, and young growth in particular, may have varying degrees of indumentum, from lightly to densely hairy, or even scabrid (sandpapery). The leaves measure up to 20 cm (7.9 in) long by 7 cm (2.8 in) wide but are more commonly about 12 cm (4.7 in) by 5 cm (2.0 in). They are generally elliptic to ovate in shape, the edges may be either toothed or entire, and the lateral veins are very distinct.

The inflorescences are about 20 cm (7.9 in) long and carry on average about 60 fragrant flowers, each about 10 mm (0.39 in) diameter. There are 4 or 5 pale green sepals and 3 white petals. Stamens number about 120–150 and are about 5 mm (0.20 in) long. There are usually 3 carpels with 10 ovules each. The fruiting carpels are about 8 mm (0.31 in) long with a pointed apex. Each contains a single black seed surrounded by a red frilled aril.

== Taxonomy ==
This species was first described in 1865 by German-born Australian botanist Ferdinand von Mueller, who published the name in volume 5 his book Fragmenta phytographiæ Australiæ.

=== Infraspecies ===
There are six varieties accepted, including the autonym, as follows:

- Tetracera nordtiana var. celebica Hoogland
- Tetracera nordtiana var. everillii (F.Muell.) Hoogland
- Tetracera nordtiana var. louisiadica Hoogland
- Tetracera nordtiana var. moluccana (Martelli) Hoogland
- Tetracera nordtiana var. nordtiana
- Tetracera nordtiana var. wuthiana (F.Muell.) Hoogland

=== Etymology ===
The genus name Tetracera is compounded from the Ancient Greek words τετρα (tetra), four, and κέρας (kéras), horn, in reference to the fruit that have four 'horns' or 'beaks'. The species epithet nordtiana was chosen by Mueller in honour of his then-fiancée Rebecca Nordt.

== Distribution and habitat ==
Tetracera nordtiana is native to Sulawesi, the Maluku Islands, the island of New Guinea and the Australian state of Queensland. In Australia it occurs on some islands of the Torres Strait, some isolated pockets on Cape York Peninsula, and a large population in the coastal areas between about Rossville and Ingham. It grows in various forest types including rainforest and swamp forest, at altitudes from sea level to about 1,200 m (3,900 ft).

== Conservation ==
This species is listed as least concern under the Queensland Government's Nature Conservation Act. As of December 2024, it has not been assessed by the International Union for Conservation of Nature (IUCN).

== Gallery ==
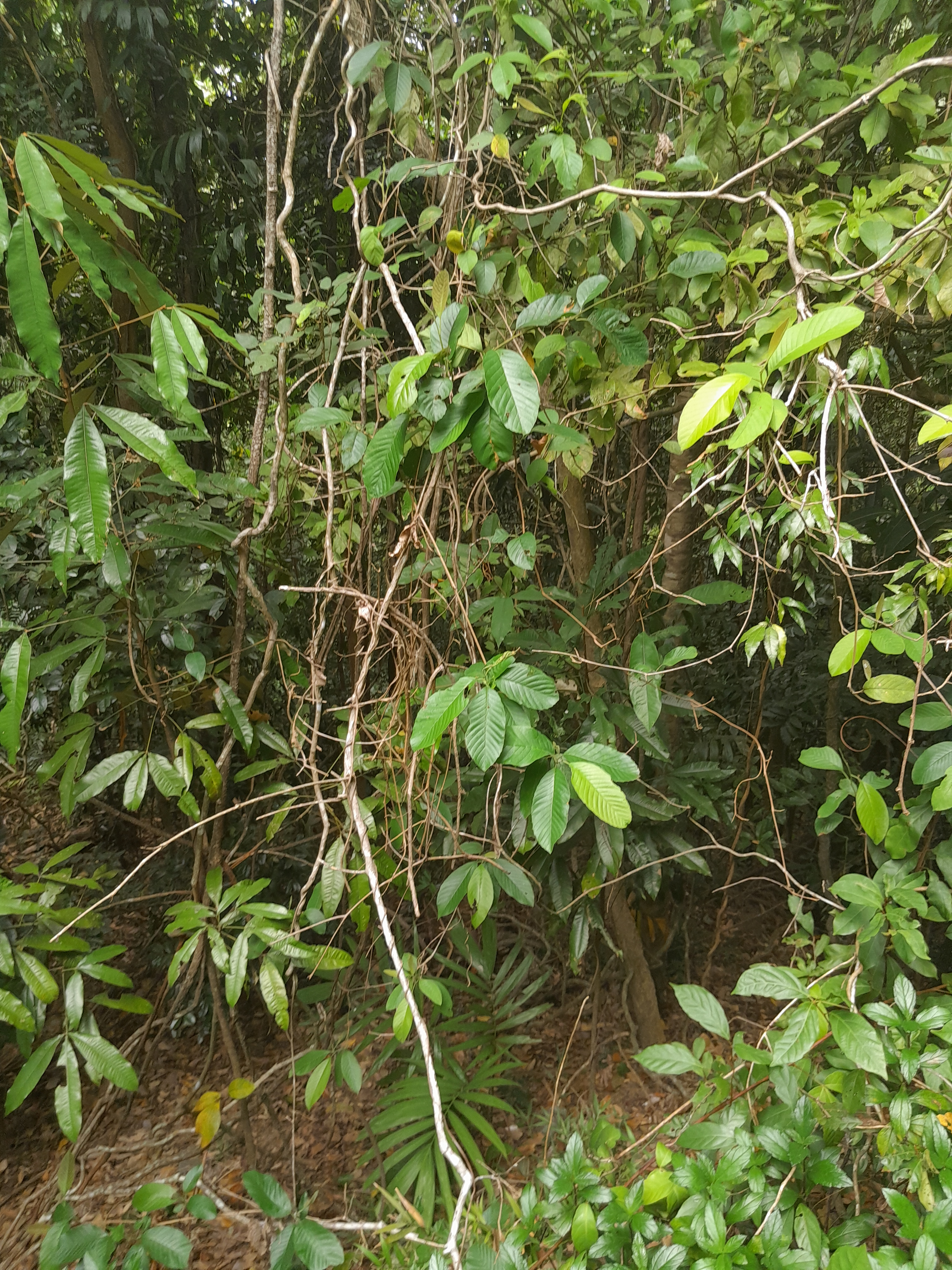
Habit

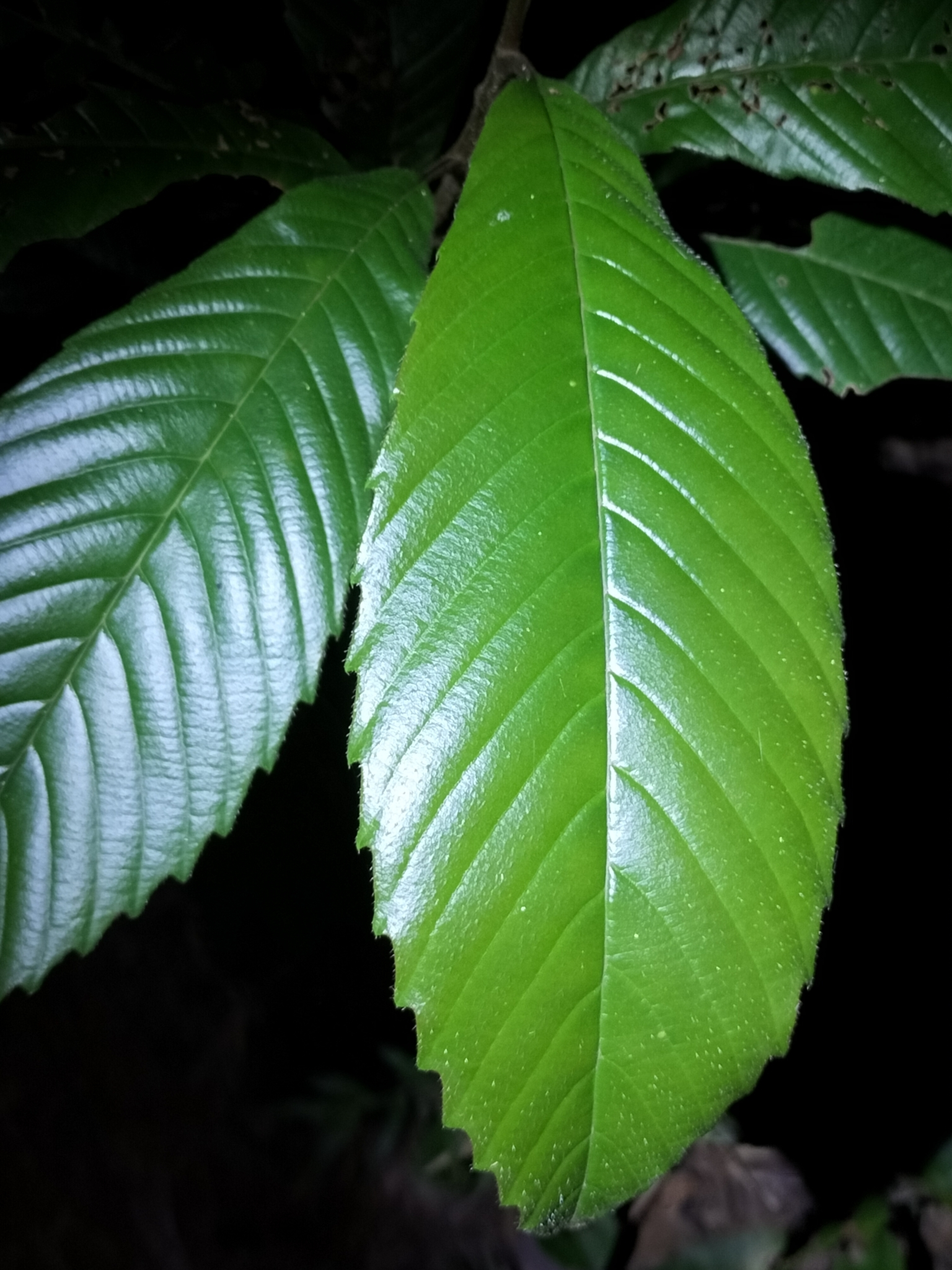
Foliage

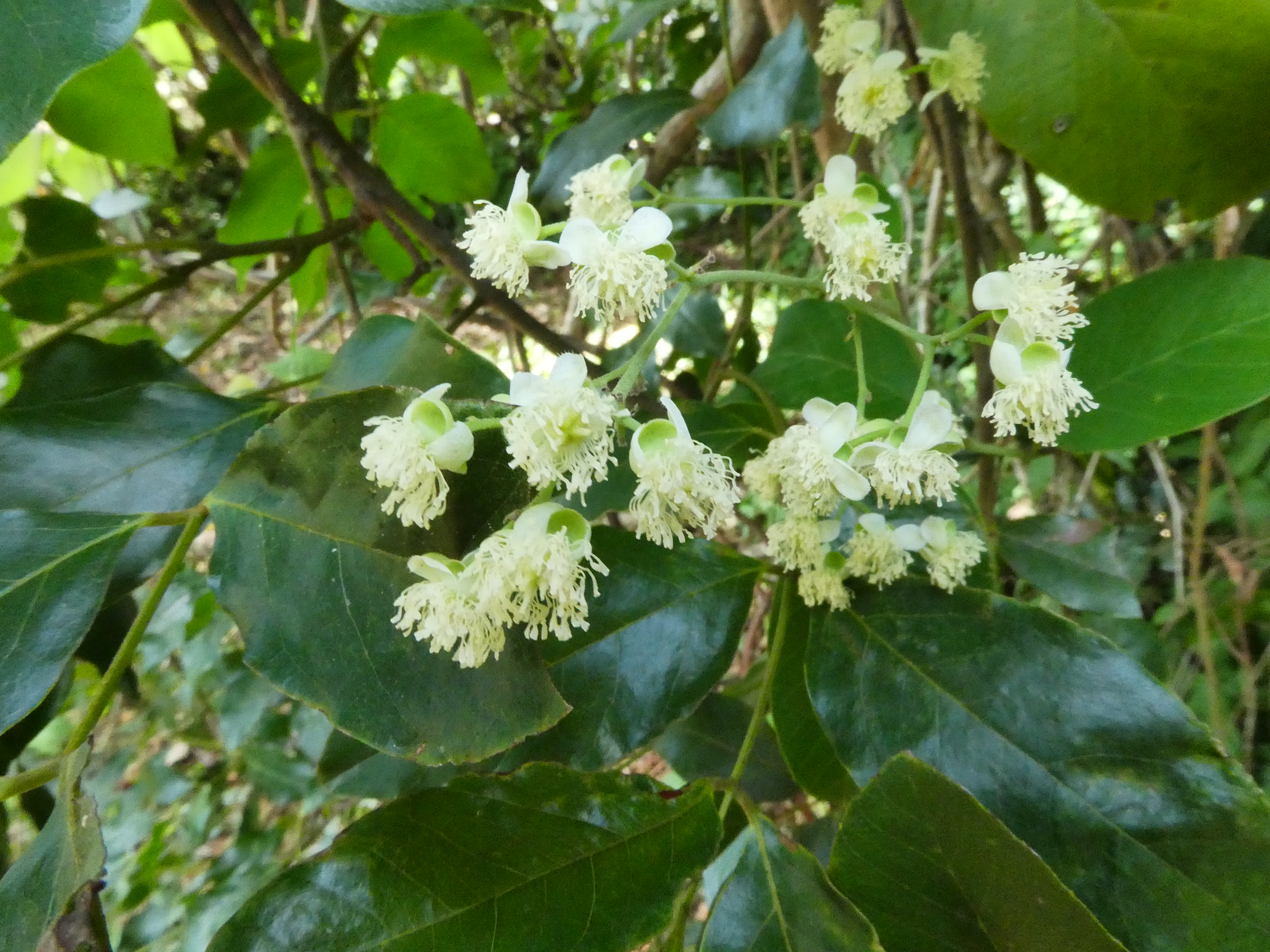
Flowers

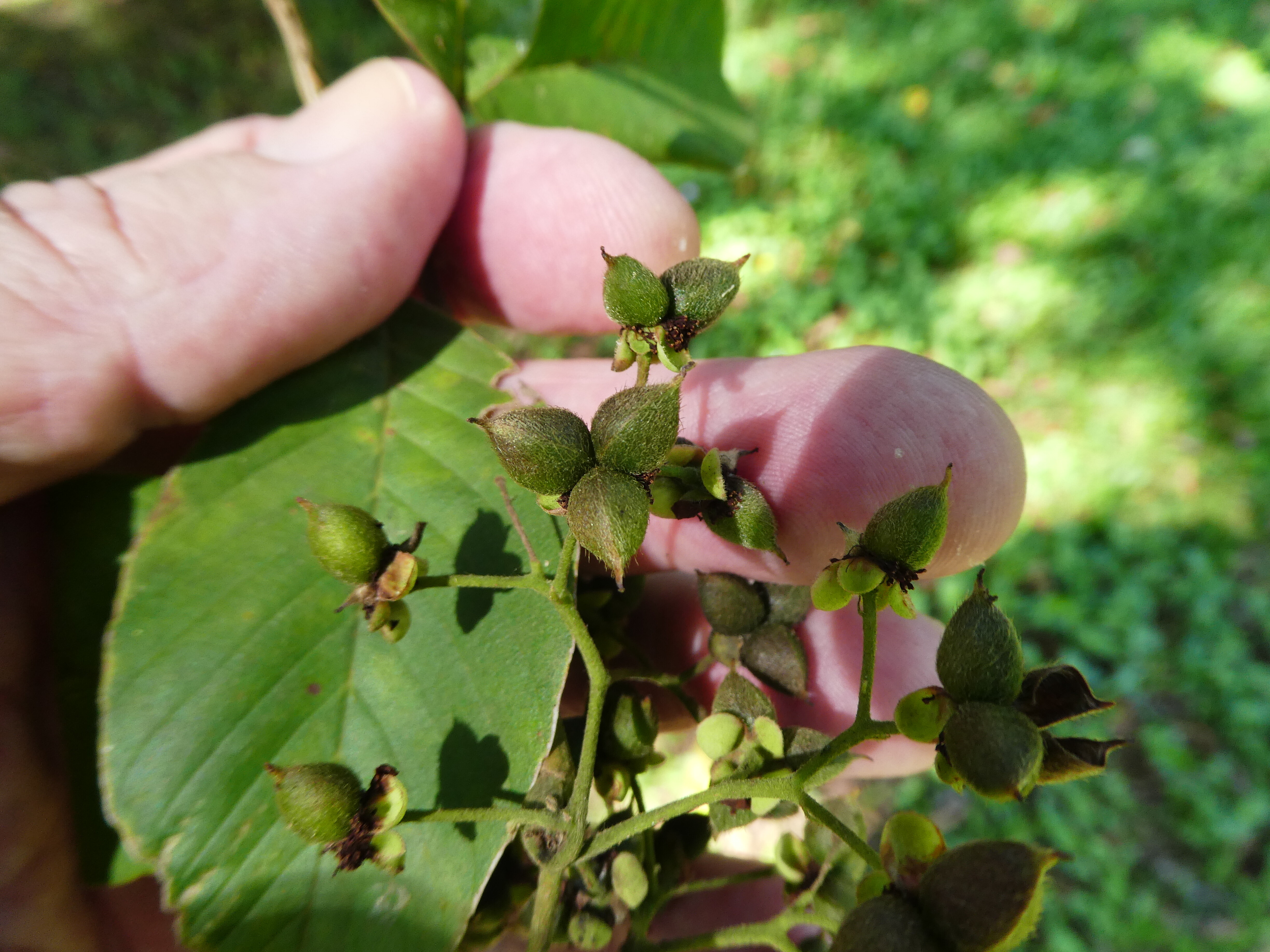
Immature fruit

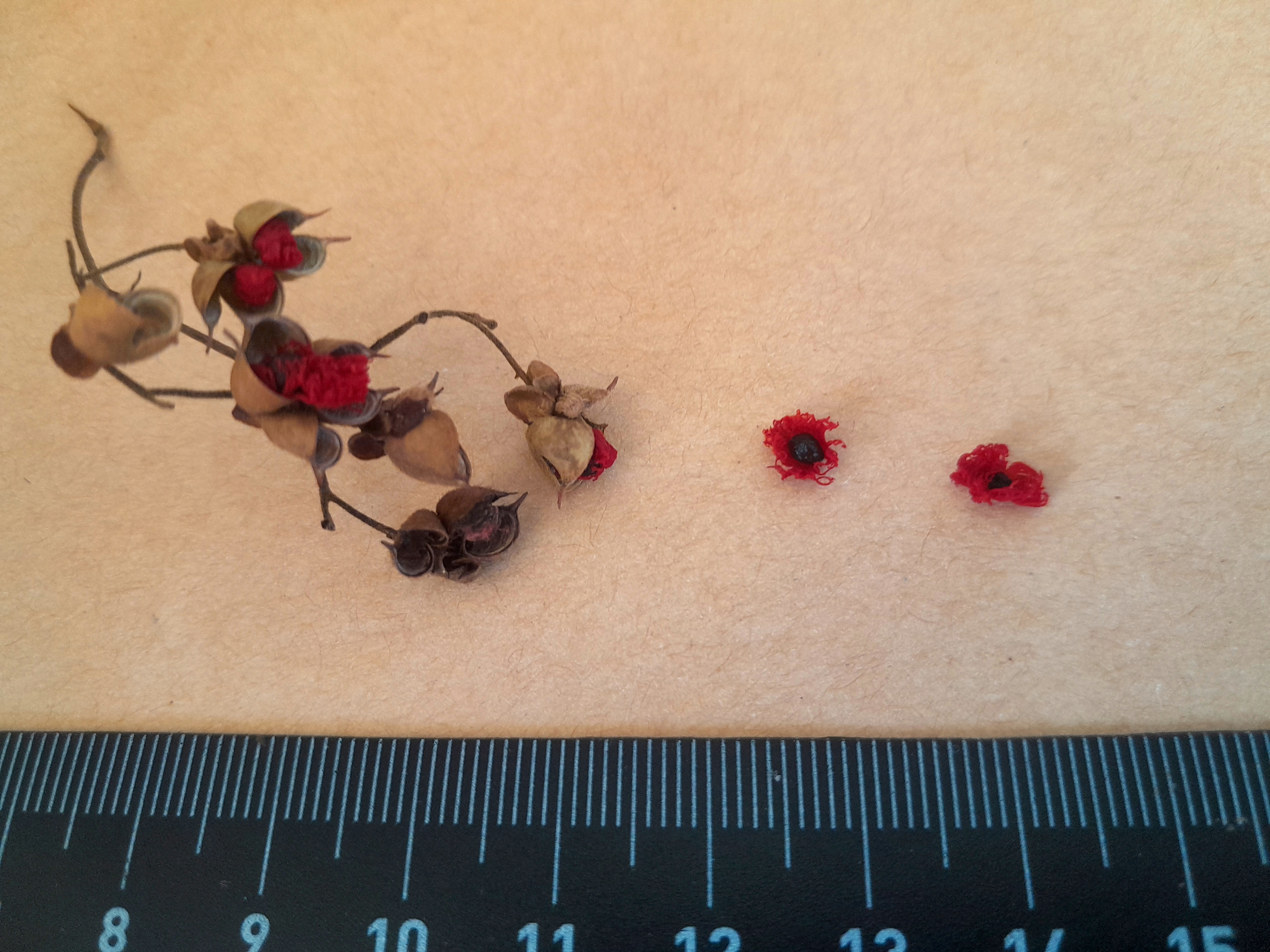
Ripe fruit capsules, and seeds with red aril
