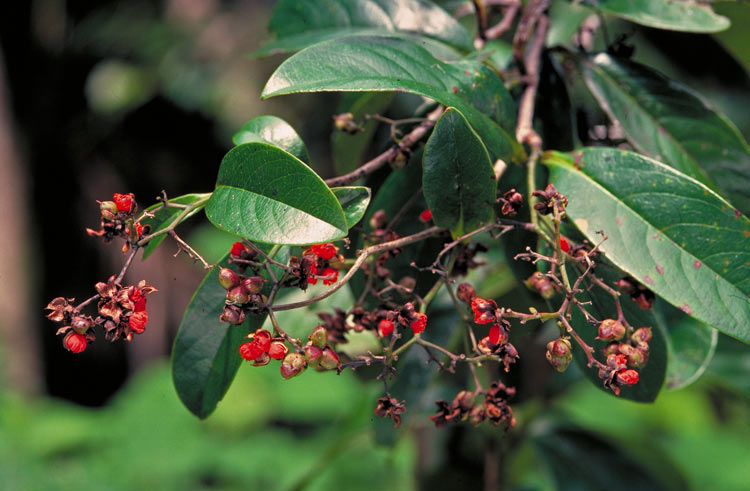
- Infructescence

Conservation status
- Least Concern (NCA)

Scientific classification
- Kingdom: Plantae
- Clade: Tracheophytes
- Clade: Angiosperms
- Clade: Eudicots
- Order: Dilleniales
- Family: Dilleniaceae
- Genus: Tetracera
- Species: T. daemeliana

Binomial name
- Tetracera daemeliana F.Muell.

= Tetracera daemeliana =

Large-leaved fire vine

Species of flowering plant

Tetracera daemeliana, commonly known as large-leaved fire vine, is a vine in the guinea flower family Dilleniaceae first described in 1886, which is endemic to the northern half of Queensland, Australia. The flowers are pleasantly perfumed.

== Description ==
Tetracera daemeliana is a twining vine whose stems may reach 12 cm (4.7 in) in diameter and become woody. The leaves are generally around 20 cm (7.9 in) long by 7 cm (2.8 in) wide, with 15–16 lateral veins and a winged petiole up to 1.5 cm (0.59 in) long. It is often difficult to determine where the petiole ends and the leaf blade begins. The leaves are glabrous on both sides, glossy above and dull underneath.

The inflorescence is a terminal panicle with up to a hundred or more flowers. The fragrant flowers are rather small with five sepals about 6 mm (0.24 in) long and three pale petals about 6 mm (0.24 in) long.

The fruit is a dry capsule with three or four carpels, initially green and turning brown when mature. The calyx is persistent at the base of the fruit, becoming the "horns" that are the basis of the genus name. The fruit dehisces to reveal bright red, frilled arils surrounding each small black seed.

== Taxonomy ==
This species was first described by the German-born Australian botanist Ferdinand von Mueller, based on material collected by Eduard Daemel at the very top of Cape York Peninsula. Mueller published it in his massive work Fragmenta phytographiæ Australiæ in 1886.

== Etymology ==
The genus name Tetracera is from the Ancient Greek words τετρα- (tetra-), meaning four, and κέρας (kéras), meaning horn, and it refers to the fruit which are beaked or horned. The species epithet daemeliana is named after the collector Eduard Daemel.

== Distribution and habitat ==
The large-leaved fire vine is endemic to northeastern Queensland and Cape York Peninsula, from around the Mission Beach area to the tip of Cape York. It grows in beach forest, monsoon forest, gallery forest and lowland rainforest at altitudes from sea level up to about 250 m (820 ft).

== Conservation ==
This species is listed by the Queensland Department of Environment and Science as least concern. As of 18 January 2024, it has not been assessed by the International Union for Conservation of Nature (IUCN).

== Gallery ==
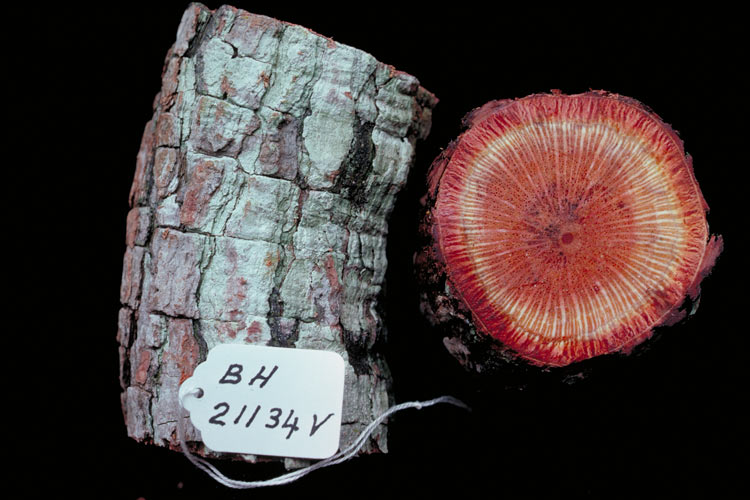
Vine stem

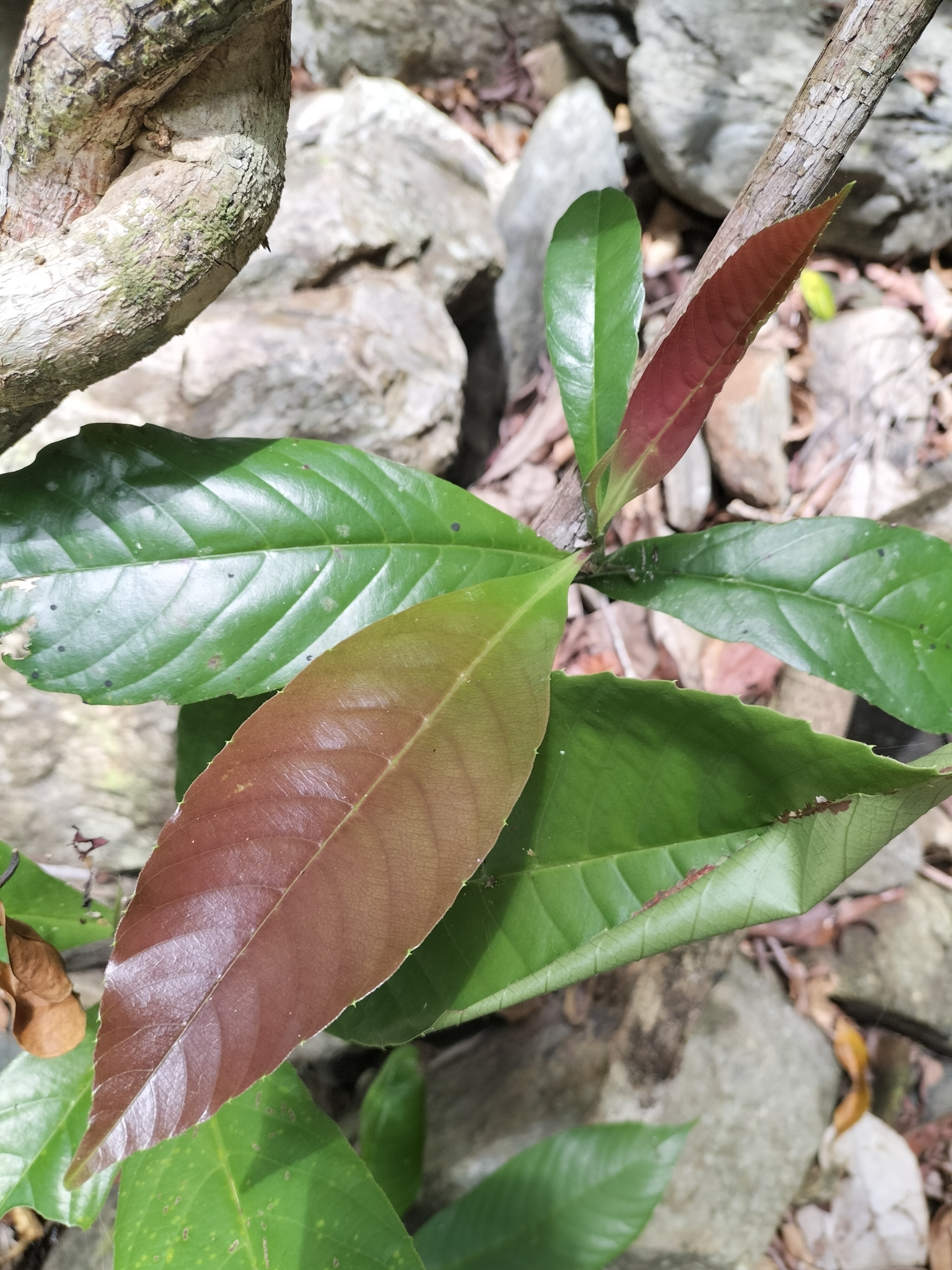
Foliage

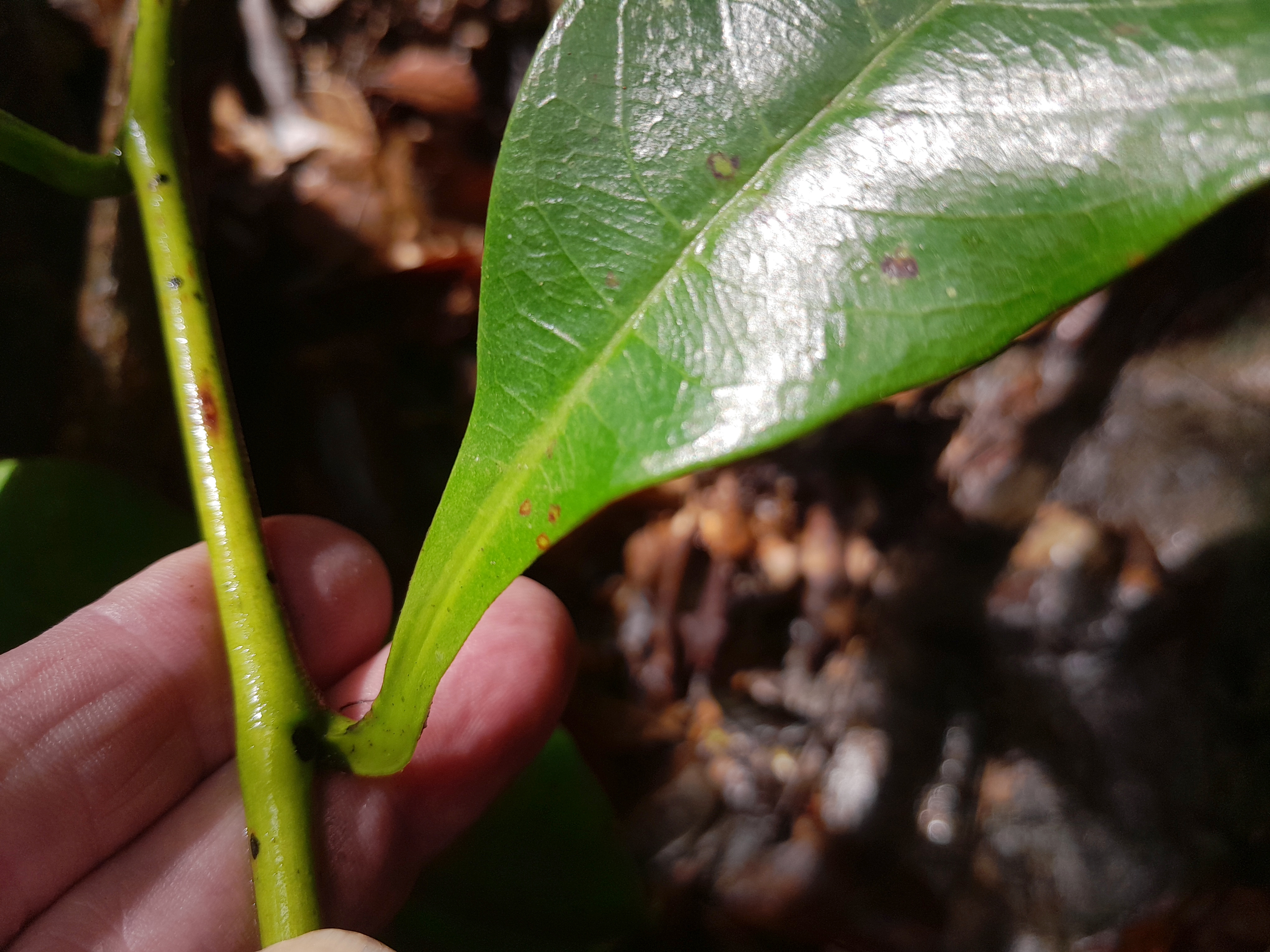
Winged petiole

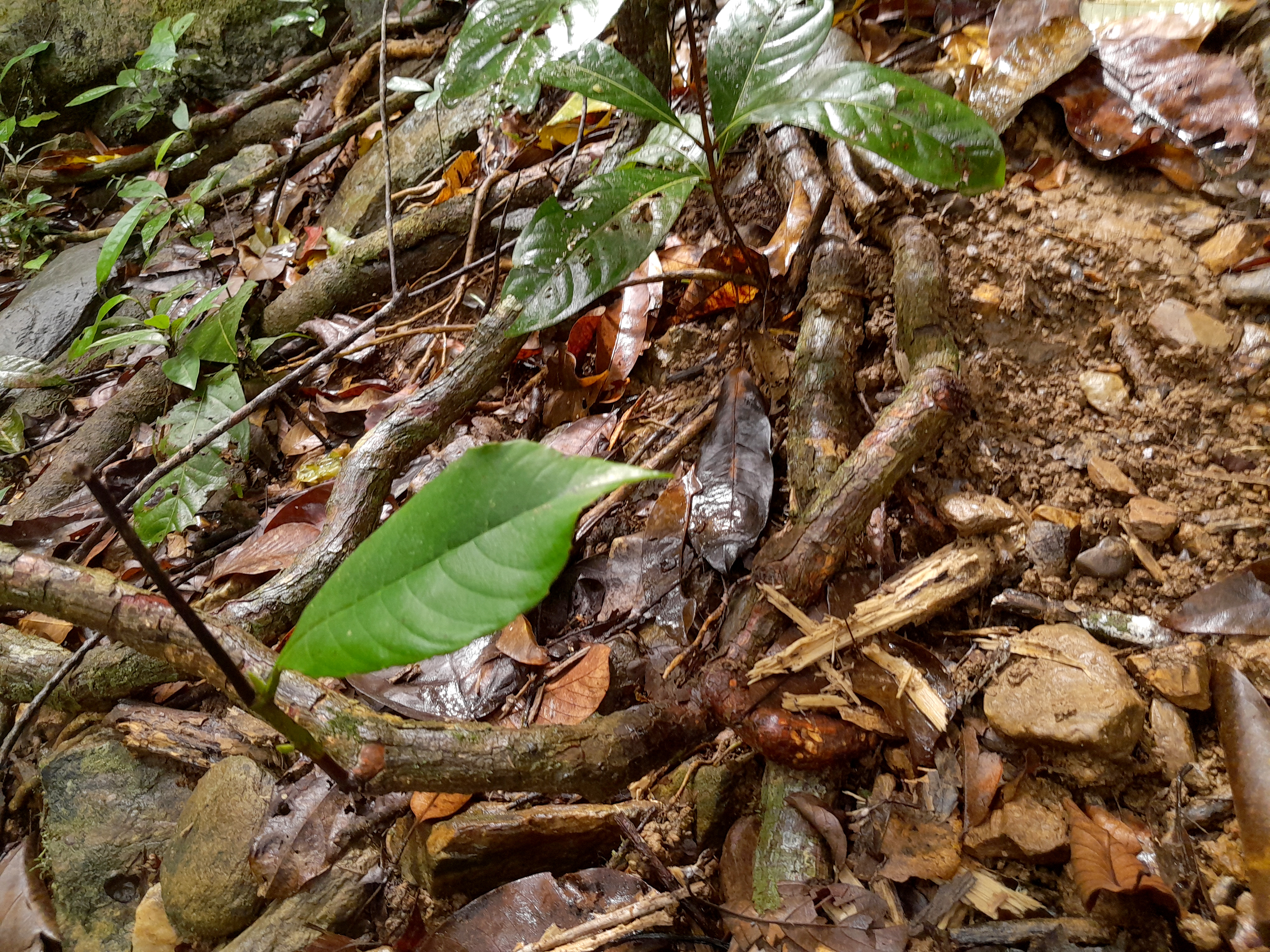
Leaf and stem

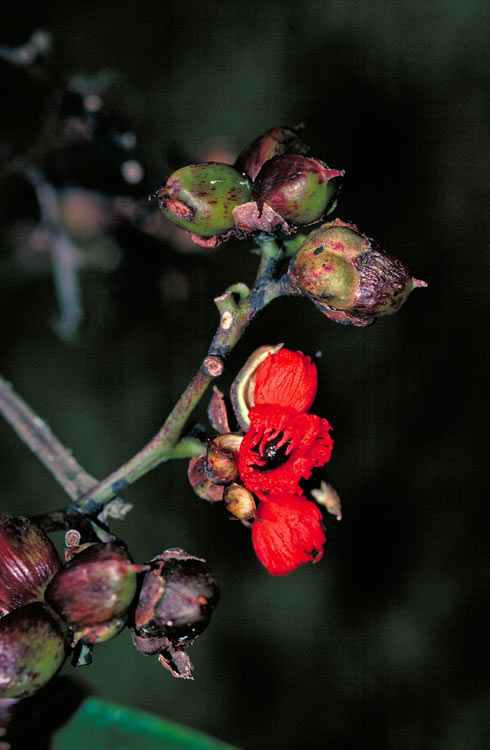
Dehiscing fruit
