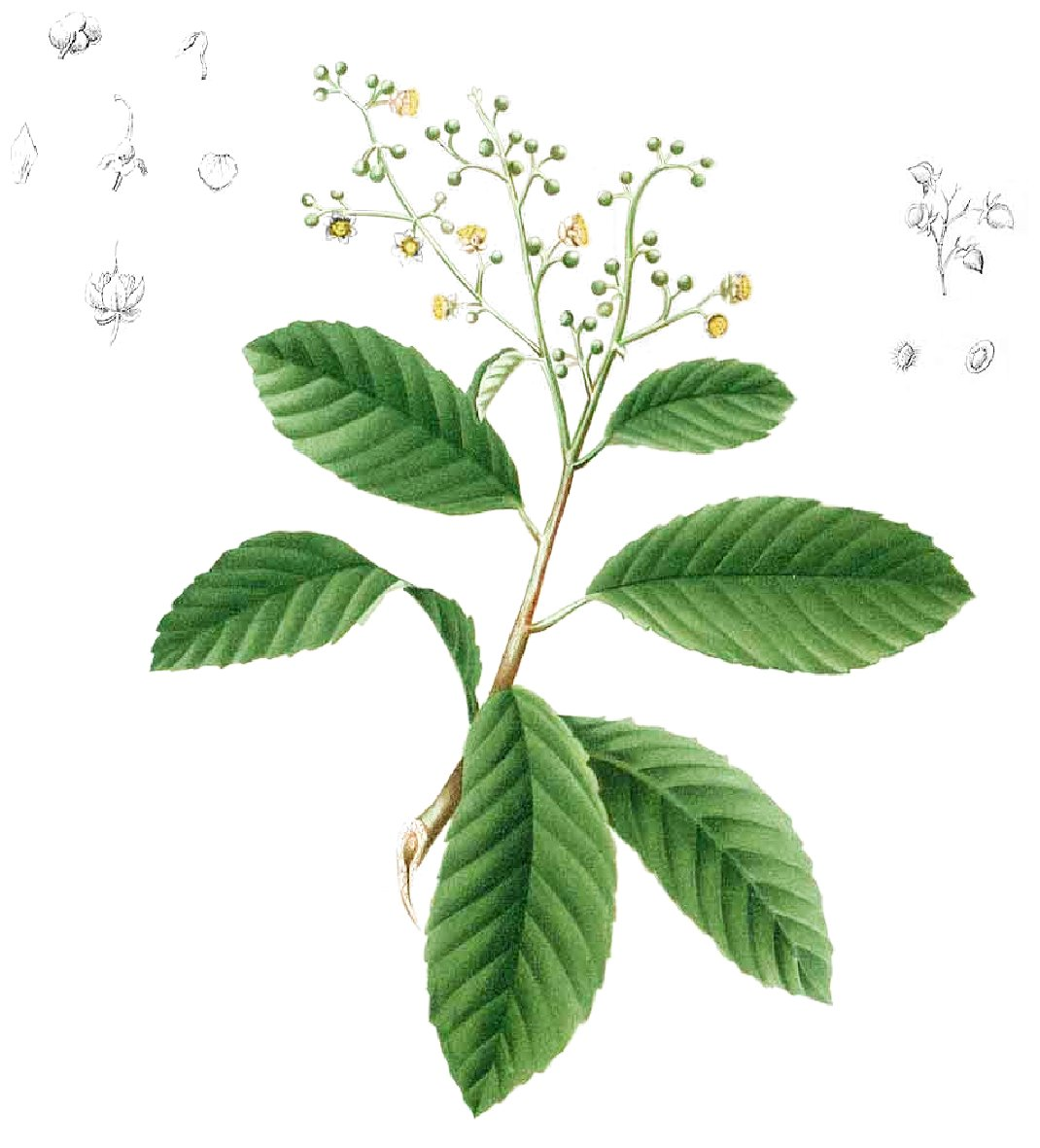
- Tetracera sarmentosa

Scientific classification
- Kingdom: Plantae
- Clade: Tracheophytes
- Clade: Angiosperms
- Clade: Eudicots
- Order: Dilleniales
- Family: Dilleniaceae
- Genus: Tetracera; L.

Species
- See text.

Synonyms
- Delima L.

= Tetracera =

Genus of flowering plants

Tetracera is a genus of flowering plants of the Dilleniaceae family native to the tropics. Several species are lianas.

== Species ==
Plants of the World Online currently includes:

- Tetracera affinis Hutch.
- Tetracera akara (Burm.f.) Merr.
- Tetracera alnifolia Willd.
- Tetracera amazonica Kubitzki
- Tetracera arborescens Jack
- Tetracera asperula Miq.
- Tetracera billardierei Martelli
- Tetracera boiviniana Baill.
- Tetracera boomii Aymard
- Tetracera breyniana Schltdl.
- Tetracera bussei Gilg
- Tetracera costata Mart. ex Eichler
- Tetracera daemeliana F.Muell.
- Tetracera edentata H.Perrier
- Tetracera empedoclea Gilg
- Tetracera eriantha (Oliv.) Hutch.
- Tetracera fagifolia Blume
- Tetracera forzzae Fraga & Aymard
- Tetracera glaberrima Martelli
- Tetracera hirsuta (Miq.) Boerl.
- Tetracera hydrophila Triana & Planch.
- Tetracera indica (Christm. & Panz.) Merr.
- Tetracera kampotensis Gagnep.
- Tetracera korthalsii Miq.
- Tetracera lanuginosa Diels
- Tetracera lasiocarpa Eichler
- Tetracera leiocarpa Stapf
- Tetracera litoralis Gilg
- Tetracera macphersonii Aymard
- Tetracera macrophylla Hook.f. & Thomson
- Tetracera madagascariensis Willd. ex Schltdl.
- Tetracera maguirei Aymard & B.M.Boom
- Tetracera maingayi Hoogland
- Tetracera masuiana De Wild. & T.Durand
- Tetracera nordtiana F.Muell.
- Tetracera oblongata DC.
- Tetracera parviflora (Rusby) Sleumer
- Tetracera poggei Gilg
- Tetracera portobellensis Beurl.
- Tetracera potatoria Afzel. ex G.Don
- Tetracera rosiflora Gilg
- Tetracera rotundifolia Sm.
- Tetracera rutenbergii Buchenau
- Tetracera sarmentosa (L.) Vahl
- Tetracera scandens (L.) Merr.
- Tetracera sellowiana Schltdl.
- Tetracera stuhlmanniana Gilg
- Tetracera surinamensis Miq.
- Tetracera volubilis L.
- Tetracera willdenowiana Steud.
- Tetracera xui H.Zhu & H.Wang
