= Tetracera sarmentosa =

Scientific classification
- Kingdom: Plantae
- Clade: Embryophytes
- Clade: Tracheophytes
- Clade: Spermatophytes
- Clade: Angiosperms
- Clade: Eudicots
- Order: Dilleniales
- Family: Dilleniaceae
- Genus: Tetracera
- Species: T. sarmentosa

Binomial name
- Tetracera sarmentosa (L.) Vahl

Synonyms
- Delima sarmentosa L.; Leontoglossum scabrum Hance; Seguieria asiatica Lour.; Tetracera asiatica (Lour.) Hoogland; Tetracera delima; Tetracera levinei Merr.; Tetracera monocarpa Blanco

Species of plant

Tetracera sarmentosa is a vine/climber and shrub in the Dilleniaceae family. It is native to parts of Tropical and Temperate Asia, from Peninsular Malaysia to China and Sri Lanka.

== Description ==
A woody vine/climber, evergreen, growing up to 20m in China, it can grow as a shrub in Bangladesh. Scabrous branchlet that are hairy when young but become glabrous later. Leaves leathery, very scabrous, some 4–12 x 2–5 cm in size, at maturity the abaxial surface is glabrous, or only the veins pubescent. The carpels and sepals are glabrous. The 3 petals are white, some 4–5 mm long. The orange fruit (follicle) are around 1 cm, thin and leathery pericarp is slightly bright when dry, and has persistent style. One black seed, with yellow aril, fringed, enclosing the base. Flowers from April to May in China, while in Tripura, India, it flowers from April to June and fruits from July and August.

== Distribution ==
The area of Tetracera sarmentosa's indigenous growth is in Asia, both in tropical and temperate areas. Countries and regions where it occurs are: Peninsular Malaysia; Thailand; Vietnam; China (Southeast and South-central including Guangdong, Guangxi, Yunnan, Hainan); Laos; Myanmar; and Sri Lanka. It is reported from Bangladesh (regions of Chittagong, Chittagong Hill Tracts, Cox’s Bazar, and Satchari National Park, Habiganj district), from India (Gondacherra & Chawmanu, Dhalai District; Chamtilla, North Tripura District, Tripura), and Biswanath district, Assam), and in Indonesia (Bengkulu, Sumatera).

== Habitat ==
It is one of the dominant taxa in the secondary tropical evergreen seasonal angiosperm lowland swamp forests of Central Vietnam (Hải Lăng District, Quảng Trị Province, and in the vicinity of Nha Trang, Khánh Hòa Province). At those areas it grows on sandy soil 10–50m elevation near the sea shore. In China the species occurs in sparse forests, thickets and on barren hills. In the Satchari National Park of Bangladesh it occurs on forest edges.

== Vernacular names ==
In China, the plant is known as 錫葉藤/锡叶藤 (Mandarin xi ye teng, Cantonese sehk yihp tàhng) or 許願藤 (Cantonese héui yuhn tàhng). The plant is known as ulu ludi by Tanchangya people of the Chittagong Hill Tracts, Bangladesh). Amongst Karbi and Munda peoples of Assam, Tetracera sarmentosa is known as samphat. A name used in English is sandpaper vine

== Uses ==
The plant is one of the foods fed to captive elephants in Sri Lanka. It is reported that Karbi and Munda peoples of Assam use cut stems to obtain water in dense forests where there is no other source. The root extract of Tetracera sarmentosa is used for treatment of rheumatism by the Tanchangya people, Bangladesh. The species has a number of leaf extracts that have potential medical effects, though there is no evidence that the plant is effective against any disease.

== History ==
The species was first described in 1794 by the Danish-Norwegian botanist, herbalist and zoologist Martin Vahl (1749–1804), in his Symbolae Botanicae.
