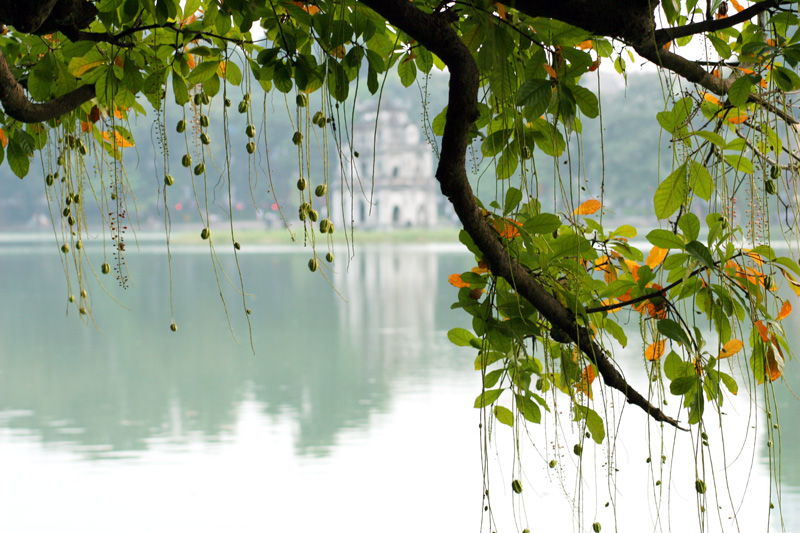
- A tree overlooking Hoàn Kiếm Lake in Vietnam

Conservation status
- Least Concern (IUCN 3.1)

Scientific classification
- Kingdom: Plantae
- Clade: Tracheophytes
- Clade: Angiosperms
- Clade: Eudicots
- Clade: Asterids
- Order: Ericales
- Family: Lecythidaceae
- Genus: Barringtonia
- Species: B. acutangula

Binomial name
- Barringtonia acutangula (L.) Gaertn.

Synonyms
- Barringtonia rubra Baill. ex Laness. [Illegitimate]; Butonica acutangula (L.) Lam.; Caryophyllus acutangulus (L.) Stokes; Eugenia acutangula L.; Huttum acutangulum (L.) Britten; Michelia acutangula (L.) Kuntze; Stravadium acutangulum (L.) Sweet; Stravadium acutangulum (L.) Miers

= Barringtonia acutangula =

Species of flowering plant

Barringtonia acutangula is a species of plant in the family Lecythidaceae native to coastal areas from Afghanistan east to mainland Southeast Asia and south to northern Australia. It has a conservation status of least concern, and it has culinary and medicinal uses in parts of Asia. Common names include freshwater mangrove, itchytree and mango-pine.

== Description ==
This plant is a tree that grows to about 8–15 meters high. Its leaves are thick, smooth and oval in shape, about 8–12 centimeters long and 4–5 cm wide, with reddish petioles about 0.5–1.0 cm long. The plant has drooping raceme of up to 50 cm long, with numerous large, white flowers. Its fruit is oval-shaped and about 3 cm long, with one seed inside.

== Distribution ==
It is native to the following regions as defined in the World Geographical Scheme for Recording Plant Distributions:

- Western Asia: – Afghanistan
- Indian Subcontinent: – Assam, Bangladesh, India, Nepal, Pakistan, Sri Lanka
- Indo-China: – Cambodia, Laos, Myanmar, Thailand, Vietnam
- Malesia: – Borneo, Jawa, Lesser Sunda Islands, Malaya, Philippines, Sulawesi, Sumatera
- Papuasia: – New Guinea
- Australia: – Northern Territory, Queensland, Western Australia

== Uses ==
=== Food ===
The young leaves of this plant are consumed as food, such as in Vietnam where they are eaten fresh with other vegetables, meat and shrimp.

=== Medicinal ===
Research on this plant has reported a number of medicinal uses, including antitumor (seed extract), antibiotic, inhibition of growth of Helicobacter pylori, and antifungal activity.

The 1889 book 'The Useful Native Plants of Australia' records that "In India an extract or juice is obtained from the leaves of this tree which, when mixed with oil, is used in native [sic.] practice for eruptions of the skin. The kernels powdered and prepared with sago and butter, are used in diarrhoea; mixed with milk they produce vomiting (Treasury of Botany). The root is bitter, and is said to be similar to Cinchona, but also cooling and aperient. (Drury)."

== Chemistry ==
Its bark contains potent painkillers, structurally unrelated to known opioid painkillers

Also 3,3'-dimethoxy ellagic acid, dihydromyricetin, gallic acid, bartogenic acid and stigmasterol, triterpenoids, olean-18-en-3beta-O-E-coumaroyl ester and olean-18-en-3beta-O-Z-coumaroyl ester 12, 20(29)-lupadien-3-o

Oleanane-type isomeric triterpenoids:- racemosol A (1) [22alpha-acetoxy-3beta,15alpha,16alpha,21beta-tetrahydroxy-28-(2-methylbutyryl)olean-12-ene] and isoracemosol A (2) [21beta-acetoxy-3beta,15alpha,16alpha,28-tetrahydroxy-22alpha-(2-methylbutyryl)olean-12-ene].

Saponins,: barringtoside A, 3-O-beta-D-xylopyranosyl(1-->3)-[beta-D-galactopyranosyl(1-->2)]-beta-D- glucuronopyranosyl barringtogenol C; barringtoside B, 3-O-beta-D-xylopyranosyl(1-->3)-]beta-D-galactopyranosyl(1-->2)]-beta-D- glucuronopyranosyl-21-O-tigloyl-28-O-isobutyryl barringtogenol C; barringtoside C, 3-O-alpha-L-arabinopyranosyl(1-->3)-[beta-D-galactopyranosyl(1-->2 )]-beta-D - glucuronopyranosyl barringtogenol C.

== Photos ==
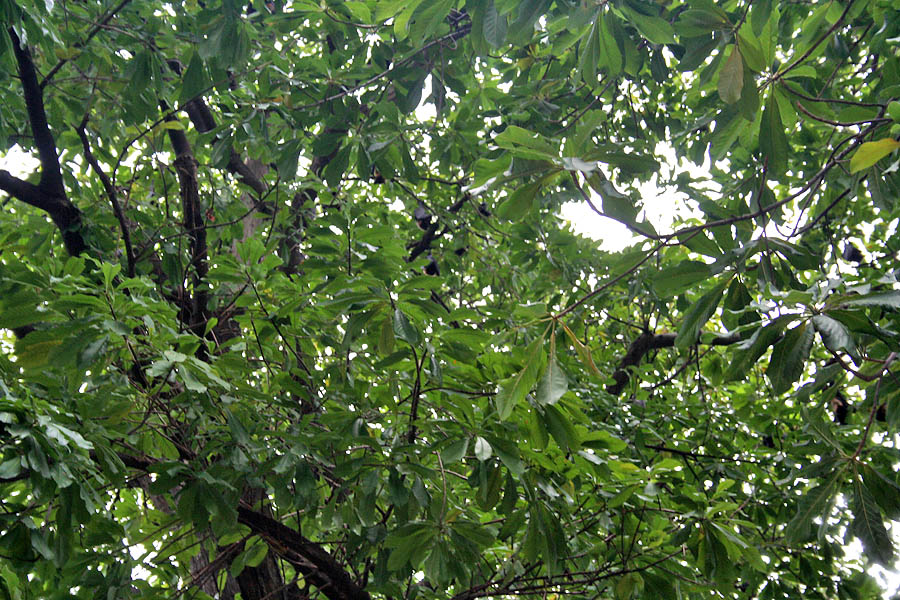
in Kolkata, West Bengal, India.

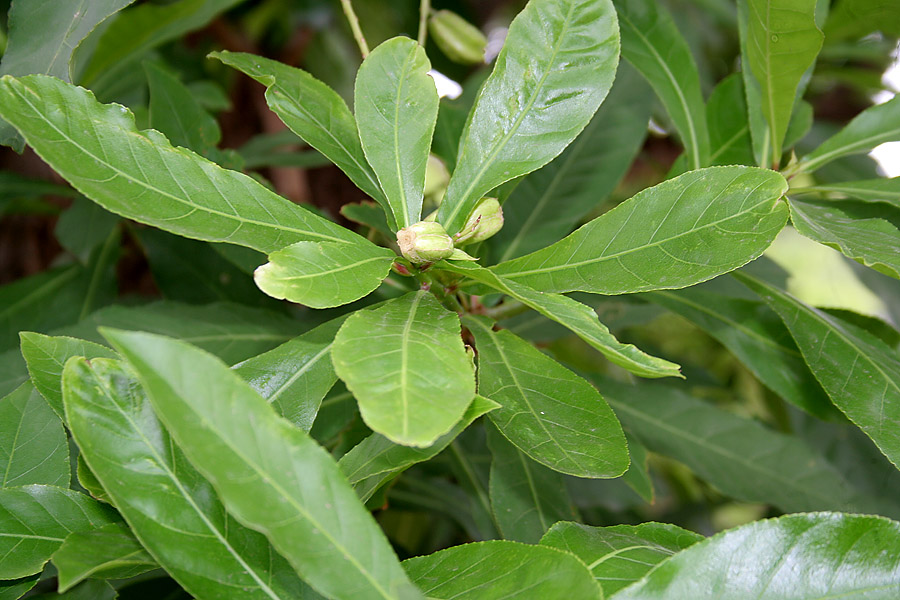
fruits in Kolkata, West Bengal, India.

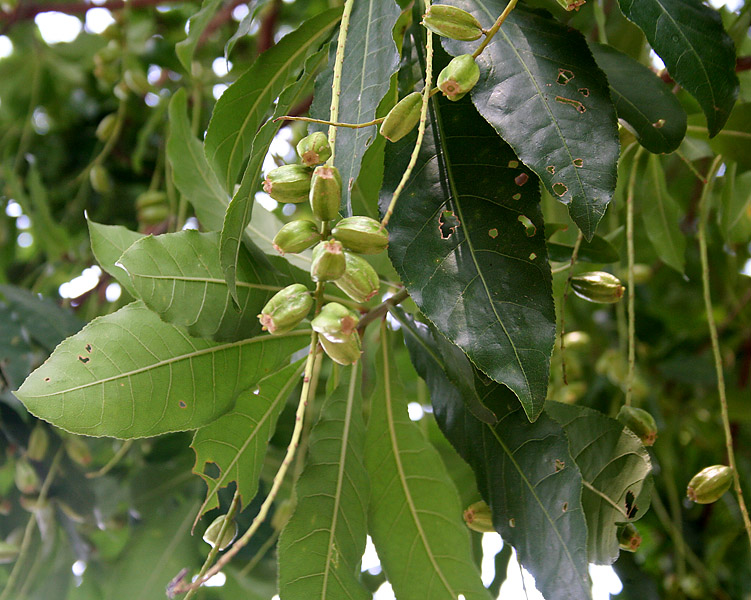
fruits in Kolkata, West Bengal, India.

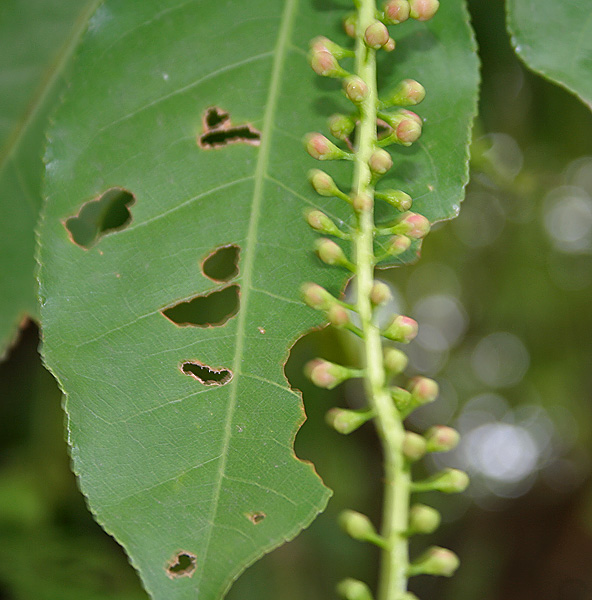
flower buds in Kolkata, West Bengal, India.

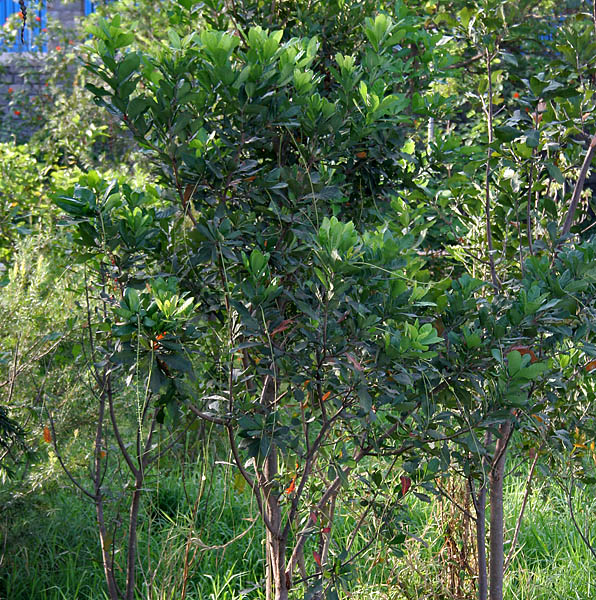
Tree in Hyderabad, India.

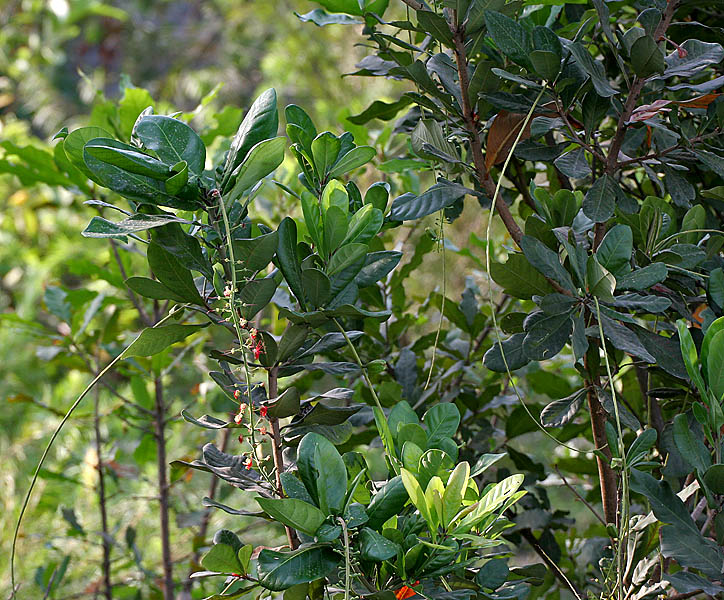
Flowers in Hyderabad, India.

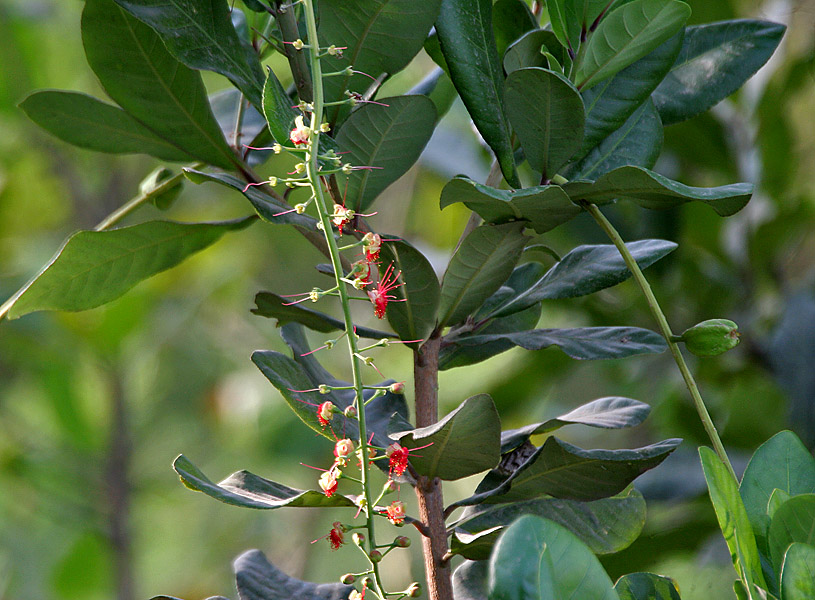
Flowers in Hyderabad, India.

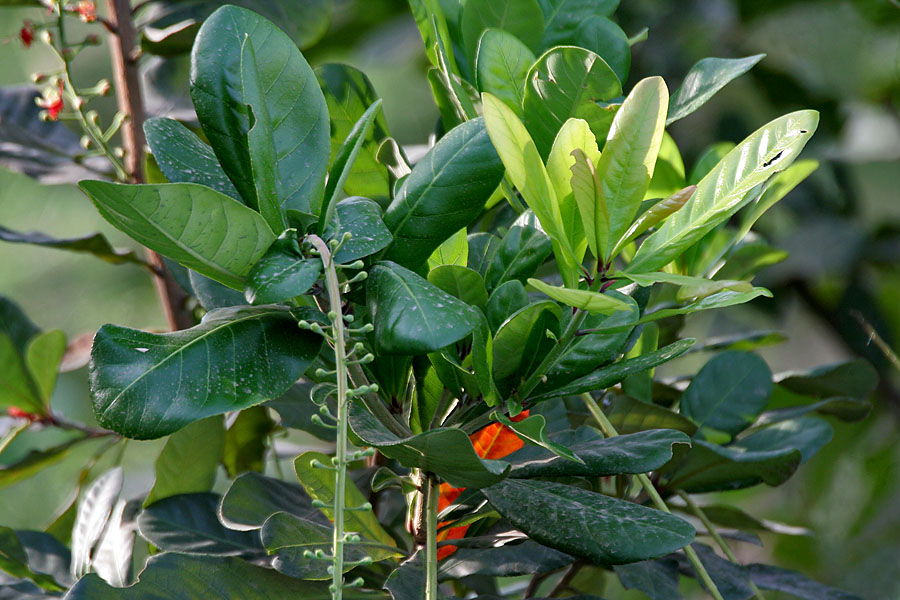
Flower buds in Hyderabad, India.

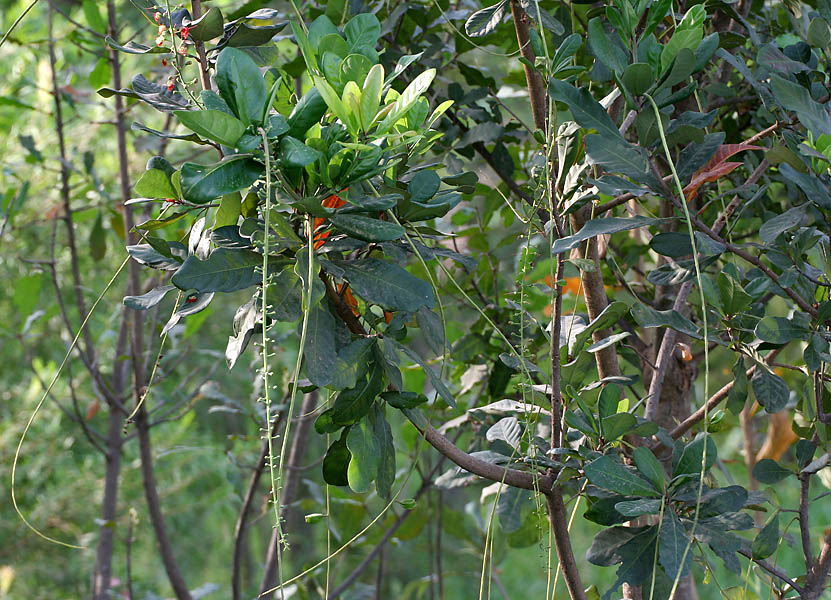
Flowers in Hyderabad, India.

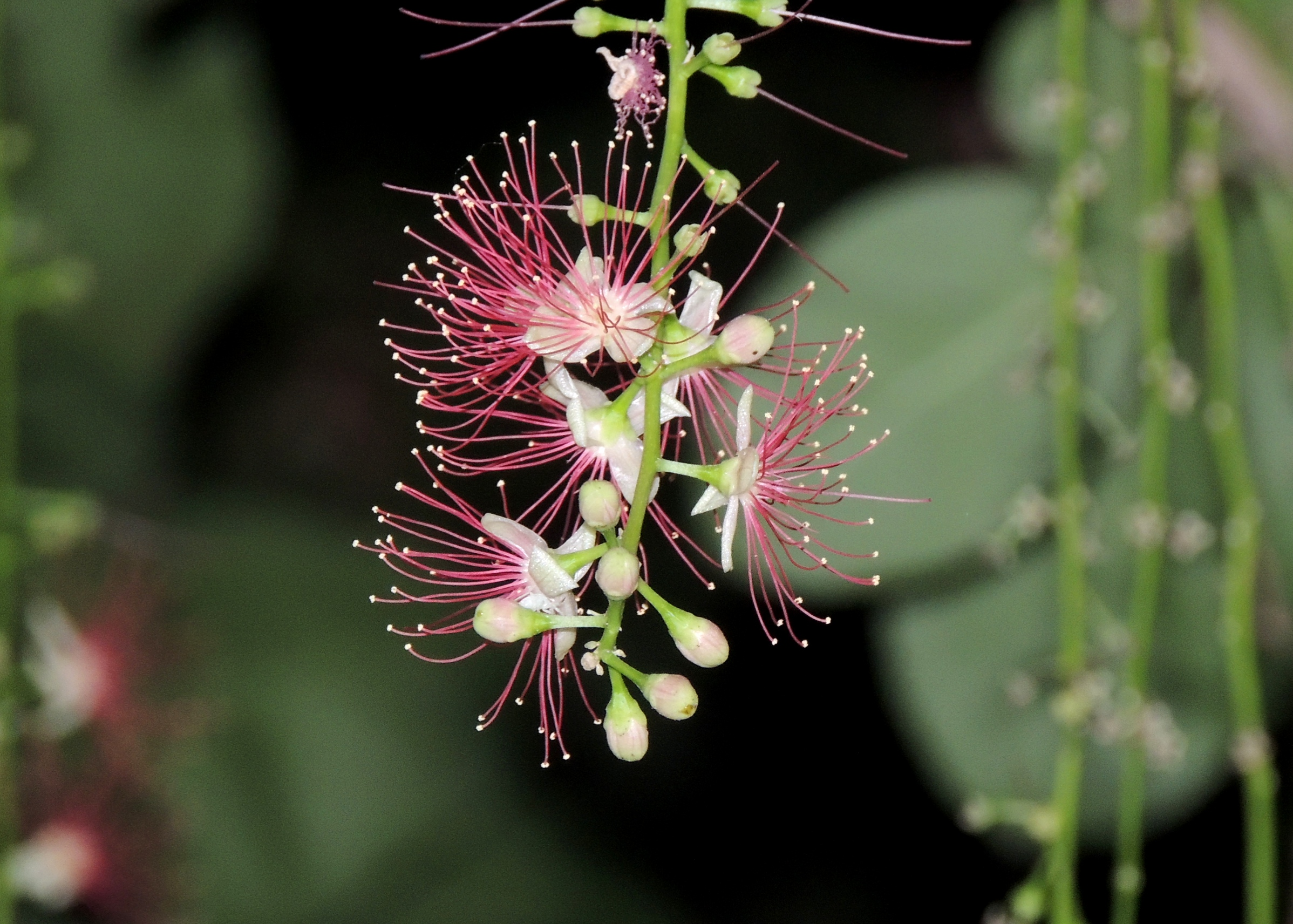
Flowers in Dombivli, India
