= Acacia dielsii =

Scientific classification
- Kingdom: Plantae
- Clade: Tracheophytes
- Clade: Angiosperms
- Clade: Eudicots
- Clade: Rosids
- Order: Fabales
- Family: Fabaceae
- Subfamily: Caesalpinioideae
- Clade: Mimosoid clade
- Genus: Acacia
- Species: A. dielsii

Binomial name
- Acacia dielsii E.Pritz.
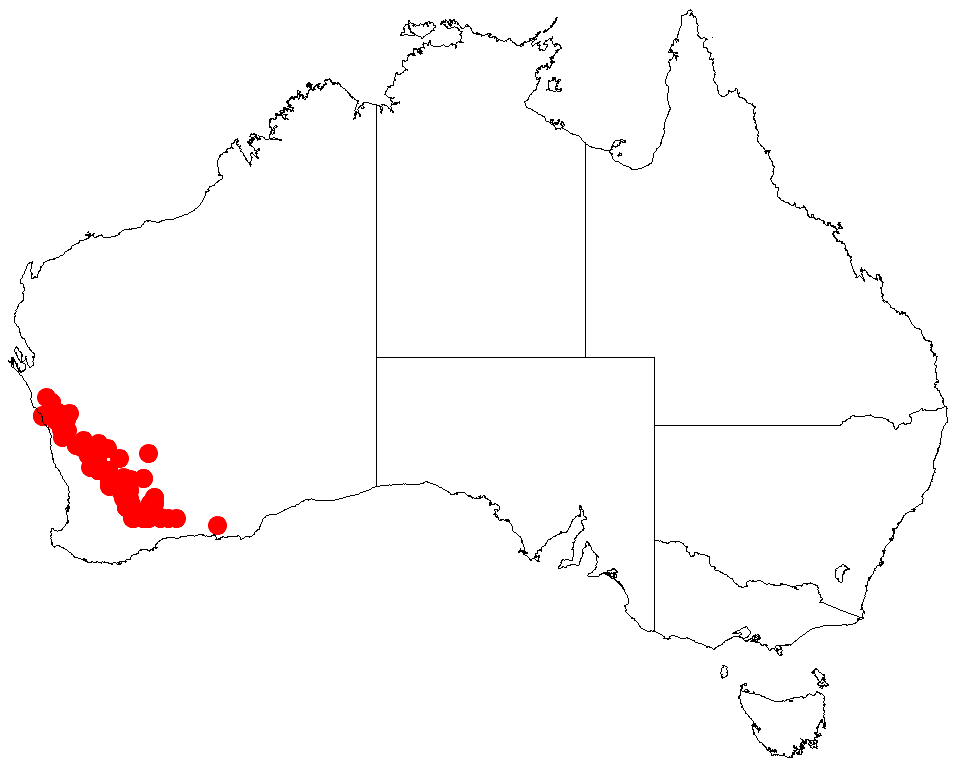
- Occurrence data from AVH

Synonyms
- Acacia ewartiana W.Fitzg. ex Jean White; Acacia ewartiana W.Fitzg. isonym; Racosperma dielsii (E.Pritz.) Pedley

Species of legume

Acacia dielsii is a species of flowering plant in the family Fabaceae and is endemic to the south-west of Western Australia. It is a shrub with inclined to erect, terete phyllodes, spherical heads of golden yellow flowers and pods readily breaking into one-seeded, spindle-shaped sections.

== Description ==
Acacia dielsii is shrub that typically grows to a height of 0.5 to 2 metres (2 to 7 ft) and has terete or weakly-angled, glabrous branchlets. Its phyllodes are inclined to erect, straight to curved and terete, 10–35 mm (0.39–1.38 in) long and 0.7–0.9 mm (0.028–0.035 in) wide, glaucous when young, ageing to pale green and glabrous. There are 14 to 18 slightly raised veins on the phyllodes. The flowers are arranged in two spherical heads in axils on peduncles 2–4 mm (0.079–0.157 in) long with persistent hooded bracts. The heads are 2.5–3.5 mm (0.098–0.138 in) in diameter with 8 to 17 golden yellow flowers. Flowering occurs from February to September and the pods are up to 30 mm (1.2 in) long and 1.2–1.8 mm (0.047–0.071 in) wide and thin, readily breaking into one-seeded, spindle-shaped sections. The seeds are narrowly oblong, 2.5–3.0 mm (0.098–0.118 in) long tan, mottled and slightly glossy and lack an aril.

== Taxonomy ==
Acacia dielsii was first formally described in 1904 by the botanist Ernst Georg Pritzel in Botanische Jahrbücher für Systematik, Pflanzengeschichte und Pflanzengeographie from specimens he collected 5 km (3.1 mi) south of Tammin in 1901.

Acacia dielsii is closely related to A. nivea and A. obesa which together make up the "A. dielsii group" of wattles.

The specific epithet (dielsii) honours the German botanist Ludwig Diels.

== Distribution and habitat ==
This species of wattle occurs in a belt from the Murchison River, east of Kalbarri, to the Newdegate area, where it grows in sandy, loamy and lateritic soils in open scrub and shrubland, in the Avon Wheatbelt, Coolgardie, Geraldton Sandplains, Mallee and Yalgoo bioregions of south-western Western Australia.

== Conservation status ==
Acacia dielsii is listed as "not threatened" by the Government of Western Australia Department of Biodiversity, Conservation and Attractions.

== See also ==
- List of Acacia species
