= Max Schlosser (palaeontologist) =

German paleontologist and geologist

Max Schlosser (5 February 1854 – 7 October 1932) was a German paleontologist and geologist.

Schlosser was the son of a royal battalion doctor and received his Abitur (secondary education) at the Ludwigsgymnasium in Munich. From 1873, he studied natural sciences at the Ludwig-Maximilians-Universität München and the Technical University of Munich, passing his teaching examination in 1878 and obtaining his doctorate in paleontology in 1880 under Karl Alfred von Zittel with a thesis on the Jurassic fauna of the Kelheim Diceras limestone. In 1884, on Zittel's recommendation, he went to Othniel Charles Marsh at the Peabody Museum of Natural History in New Haven, but returned a year later due to an illness. He continued to work as Zittel's assistant and became curator in 1890, second conservator in 1900, and then chief conservator. He retired in 1924 but continued to work at the Bavarian State Collection on a voluntary basis until 1930.

He was a leading expert on European mammals of the Tertiary period in Germany. He also worked on fossil mammals from China, based on purchases of "dragon teeth" (long gu) in Chinese pharmacies, which he published in 1903. He updated the volume on vertebrate paleontology in Zittel's Grundzüge der Paläontologie ('Fundamentals of Paleontology'). From 1895 to 1904, he was an editor of the scientific journal Neues Jahrbuch für Mineralogie, Geologie und Paläontologie.
