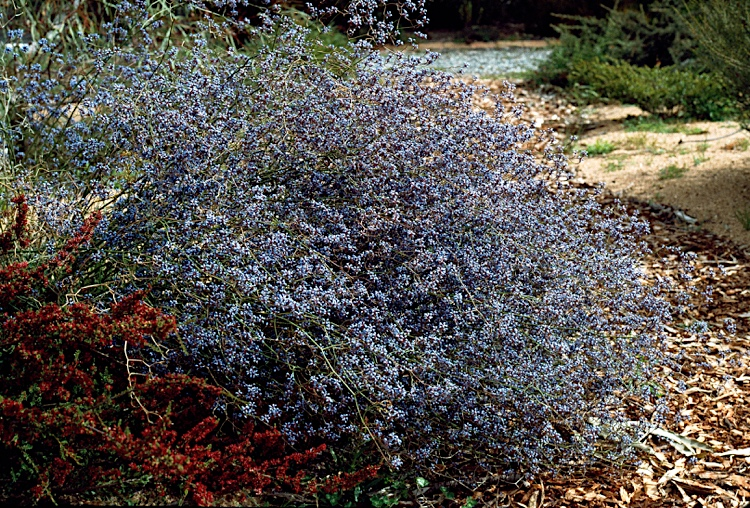

Conservation status
- Priority Three — Poorly Known Taxa (DEC)

Scientific classification
- Kingdom: Plantae
- Clade: Tracheophytes
- Clade: Angiosperms
- Clade: Eudicots
- Order: Proteales
- Family: Proteaceae
- Genus: Conospermum
- Species: C. eatoniae

Binomial name
- Conospermum eatoniae E.Pritz.

= Conospermum eatoniae =

Species of shrub native to Australia

Conospermum eatoniae, commonly known as blue lace, is a species of flowering plant in the family Proteaceae and is endemic to the south-west of Western Australia. It is a spreading shrub with egg-shaped leaves only present on young plants, and panicles of glabrous blue, tube-shaped flowers with pale green bracteoles.

== Description ==
Conospermum eatoniae is a spreading, much-branched shrub that typically grows up to 0.3–0.75 m (1 ft 0 in – 2 ft 6 in) tall and 1 m (3 ft 3 in) wide. Egg-shaped to oblong leaves are only present at the base of young plants. The flowers are arranged in panicles with secondary dichotomous branching, ending in a head of 2 to 10 flowers. The bracteoles are more or less round, 1.8–2.8 mm (0.071–0.110 in) long, 2.5–3.8 mm (0.098–0.150 in) wide, and pale green. The perianth is blue, forming a tube 1.5–4 mm (0.059–0.157 in) long. The upper lip is egg-shaped, 3.5–5 mm (0.14–0.20 in) long and 1.0–1.7 mm (0.039–0.067 in) wide, the lower lip joined for 1.3–2.5 mm (0.051–0.098 in) long with lobes 1.5–2.0 mm (0.059–0.079 in) long. Flowering occurs from August to October, and the fruit is a nut about 2 mm (0.079 in) long and 1.8 mm (0.071 in) wide and with velvety orange hairs.

== Taxonomy ==
Conospermum eatoniae was first formally described in 1904 by the botanist Ernst Georg Pritzel in Botanische Jahrbücher für Systematik, Pflanzengeschichte und Pflanzengeographie, from specimens collected by Alice Eaton near Tammin. The specific epithet (eatoniae) honours the collector of the type specimen.

== Distribution and habitat ==
Blue lace grows in sandy soils between Coorow, Goomalling and Tammin in the Avon Wheatbelt and Geraldton Sandplains bioregions in the south-west of Western Australia.

== Conservation status ==
This species of Conospermum is listed as Priority Three by the Government of Western Australia Department of Parks and Wildlife, meaning that it is poorly known, and known from only a few locations but is not under imminent threat.
