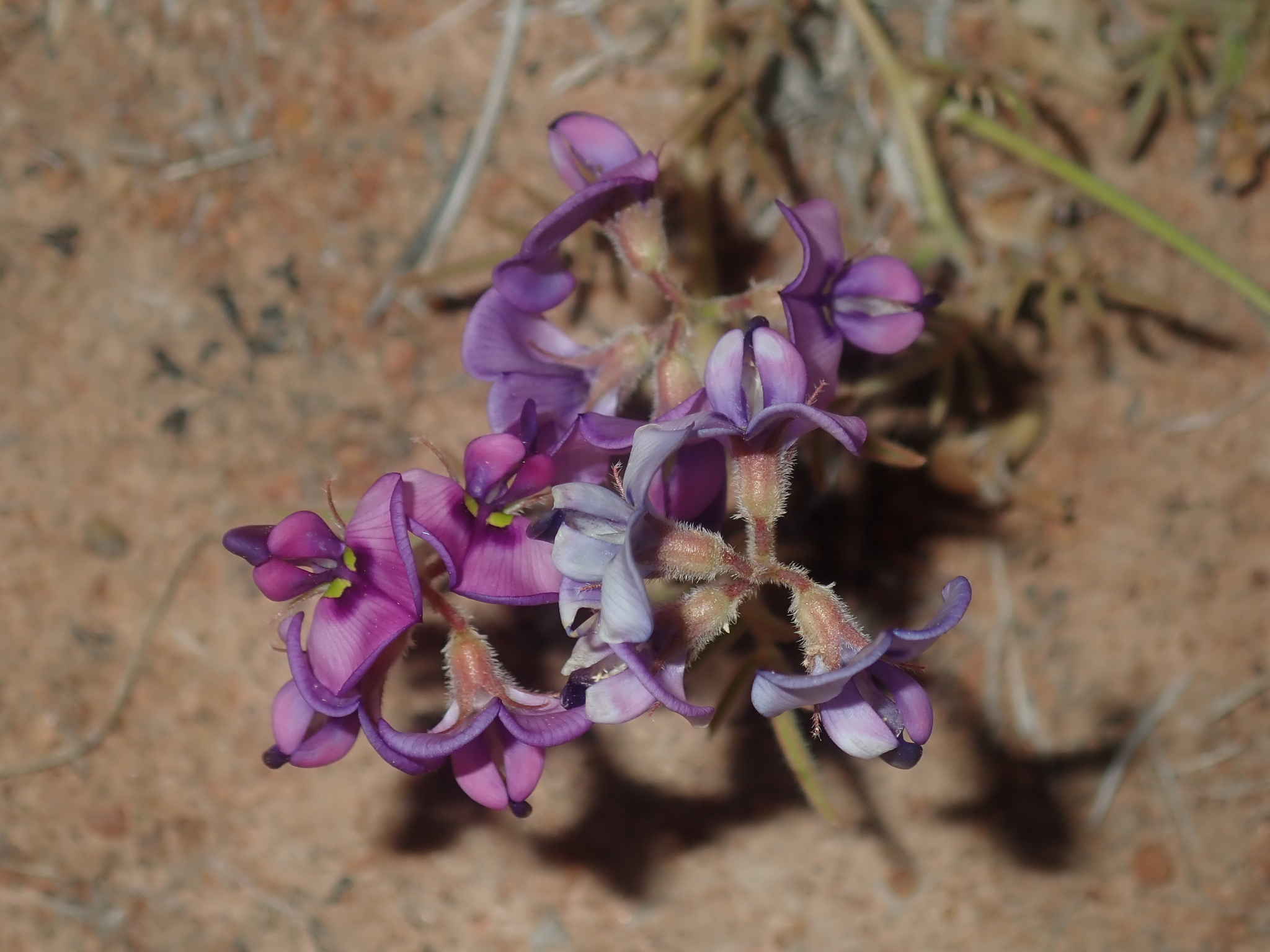

Scientific classification
- Kingdom: Plantae
- Clade: Tracheophytes
- Clade: Angiosperms
- Clade: Eudicots
- Clade: Rosids
- Order: Fabales
- Family: Fabaceae
- Subfamily: Faboideae
- Genus: Swainsona
- Species: S. tenuis

Binomial name
- Swainsona tenuis E.Pritz.

Synonyms
- Swainsona oroboides auct. non F.Muell. ex Benth.: Weber, J.Z. in Jessop, J.P. & Toelken, H.R. (ed.) (1986)

= Swainsona tenuis =

Species of plant

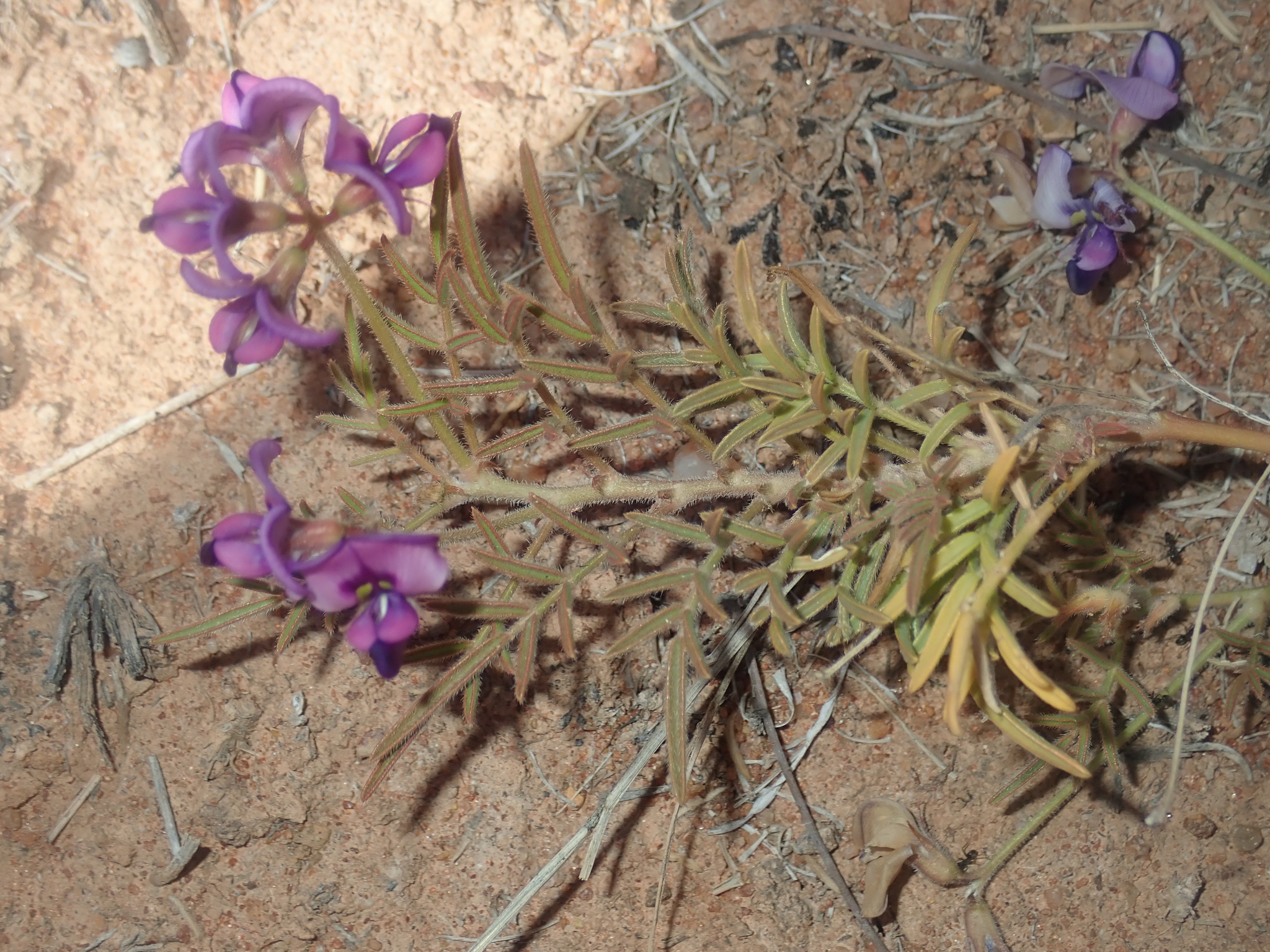
Leaves

Swainsona tenuis is a species of flowering plant in the family Fabaceae and is endemic to western continental Australia. It is a prostrate perennial herb with many stems, imparipinnate leaves with 5 to 9 egg-shaped leaflets with the narrower end towards the base, to linear or elliptic leaflets, and racemes of up to 7 purple flowers.

== Description ==
Swainsona tenuis is a prostrate perennial herb that typically grows to a height of up to about 30 cm (12 in), and has many hairy stems. Its leaves are imparipinnate, about 20–70 mm (0.79–2.76 in) long with 5 to 9 egg-shaped leaflets with the narrower end towards the base, or linear or elliptic leaflets, the side leaflets mostly 5–10 mm (0.20–0.39 in) long and 1–2 mm (0.039–0.079 in) wide. There is a stipule 2–5 mm (0.079–0.197 in) long at the base of the petiole. The flowers are arranged in racemes 10–70 mm (0.39–2.76 in) long with up to 7 flowers on a peduncle 0.5 mm (0.020 in) wide, each flower 7–9 mm (0.28–0.35 in) long on a pedicel about 3 mm (0.12 in) long. The sepals are joined at the base, forming a tube 1.5–2.5 mm (0.059–0.098 in) long, the sepal lobes often several times longer than the tube. The petals are purple, the standard petal 9–11 mm (0.35–0.43 in) long and wide, the wings 6–8 mm (0.24–0.31 in) long, and the keel about 7–10 mm (0.28–0.39 in) long and 3–4 mm (0.12–0.16 in) deep. Flowering occurs from July to September, and the fruit is mostly 10–15 mm (0.39–0.59 in) long and 4–5 mm (0.16–0.20 in) wide.

== Taxonomy and naming ==
Swainsona tenuis was first formally described in 1904 by Ernst Georg Pritzel in the Botanische Jahrbücher für Systematik, Pflanzengeschichte und Pflanzengeographie from specimens collected in 1902. The specific epithet (tenuis) means "thin" or "narrow".

== Distribution and habitat ==
This species of pea grows in sandy soil or on stony flats near creeks and rocky places in the Central Ranges, Coolgardie, Gascoyne, Gibson Desert, Great Victoria Desert, Little Sandy Desert, Murchison and Nullarbor bioregions of Western Australia, western South Australia and in the south-western part of the Northern Territory.
