= Goodenia nuda =

Conservation status
- Priority Four — Rare Taxa (DEC)

Scientific classification
- Kingdom: Plantae
- Clade: Tracheophytes
- Clade: Angiosperms
- Clade: Eudicots
- Clade: Asterids
- Order: Asterales
- Family: Goodeniaceae
- Genus: Goodenia
- Species: G. nuda

Binomial name
- Goodenia nuda E.Pritz.

Species of plant

Goodenia nuda is a species of flowering plant in the family Goodeniaceae and is endemic to the Pilbara region of Western Australia. It is an erect to ascending herb with elliptic to lance-shaped leaves at the base of the plant, and racemes of yellow flowers.

== Description ==
Goodenia nuda is an erect to ascending herb that typically grows to a height of up to 50 cm (20 in). It has elliptic to lance-shaped leaves with the narrower end towards the base, at the base of the plant, 30–60 mm (1.2–2.4 in) long and 8–20 mm (0.31–0.79 in) wide, sometimes with a few narrow teeth on the edges. The flowers are arranged in racemes up to 250 mm (9.8 in) long, with leaf-like bracts, each flower on a pedicel 20–50 mm (0.79–1.97 in) long. The sepals are narrow-elliptic to lance-shaped, 3–3.5 mm (0.12–0.14 in) long, the petals yellow, 14–16 mm (0.55–0.63 in) long. The lower lobes of the corolla are 6–7 mm (0.24–0.28 in) long with wings about 2 mm (0.079 in) wide. Flowering mainly occurs from April to August and the fruit is an oval to spherical capsule 6–7 mm (0.24–0.28 in) in diameter.

== Taxonomy and naming ==
Goodenia muelleriana was first formally described in 1905 by Ernst Georg Pritzel in the journal Botanische Jahrbücher für Systematik, Pflanzengeschichte und Pflanzengeographie from a specimen collected near Roebourne. The original specimens have been lost, but in 1990 Roger Charles Carolin selected the specimens he collected near Onslow as the neotype. The specific epithet (nuda) means "naked" or "bare", referring to the sparsely-leaved stems.

== Distribution ==
This goodenia grows in the Gascoyne, Little Sandy Desert and Pilbara biogeographic regions in the north-west of Western Australia.

== Conservation status ==
Goodenia muelleriana is classified as "Priority Four" by the Government of Western Australia Department of Parks and Wildlife, meaning that is rare or near threatened.
