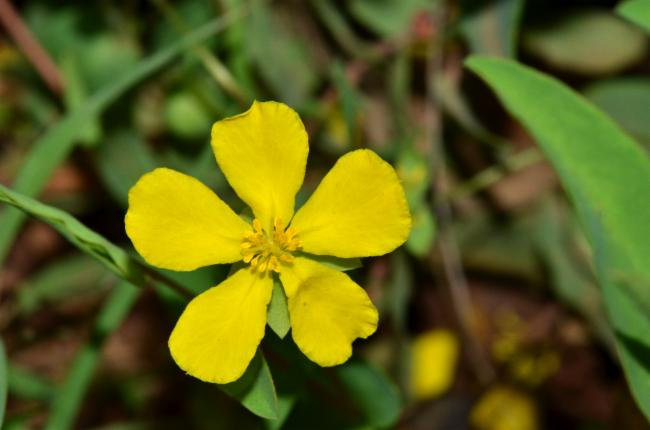

Scientific classification
- Kingdom: Plantae
- Clade: Tracheophytes
- Clade: Angiosperms
- Clade: Eudicots
- Order: Dilleniales
- Family: Dilleniaceae
- Genus: Hibbertia
- Species: H. nymphaea

Binomial name
- Hibbertia nymphaea Diels

= Hibbertia nymphaea =

Species of flowering plant

Hibbertia nymphaea is a species of flowering plant in the family Dilleniaceae and is endemic to the south-west of Western Australia. It is a prostrate or straggling shrub that typically grows to a height of 40 cm (16 in) and flowers between August and October producing yellow flowers. It was first formally described in 1904 by Ludwig Diels in Botanische Jahrbücher für Systematik, Pflanzengeschichte und Pflanzengeographie. The specific epithet (nymphaea) is a reference to nymphs who live in fountains and rivers.

Hibbertia nymphaea grows in seasonally wet places and near rivers in the Jarrah Forest, Swan Coastal Plain and Warren biogeographic regions of south-western Western Australia.

== See also ==
- List of Hibbertia species
