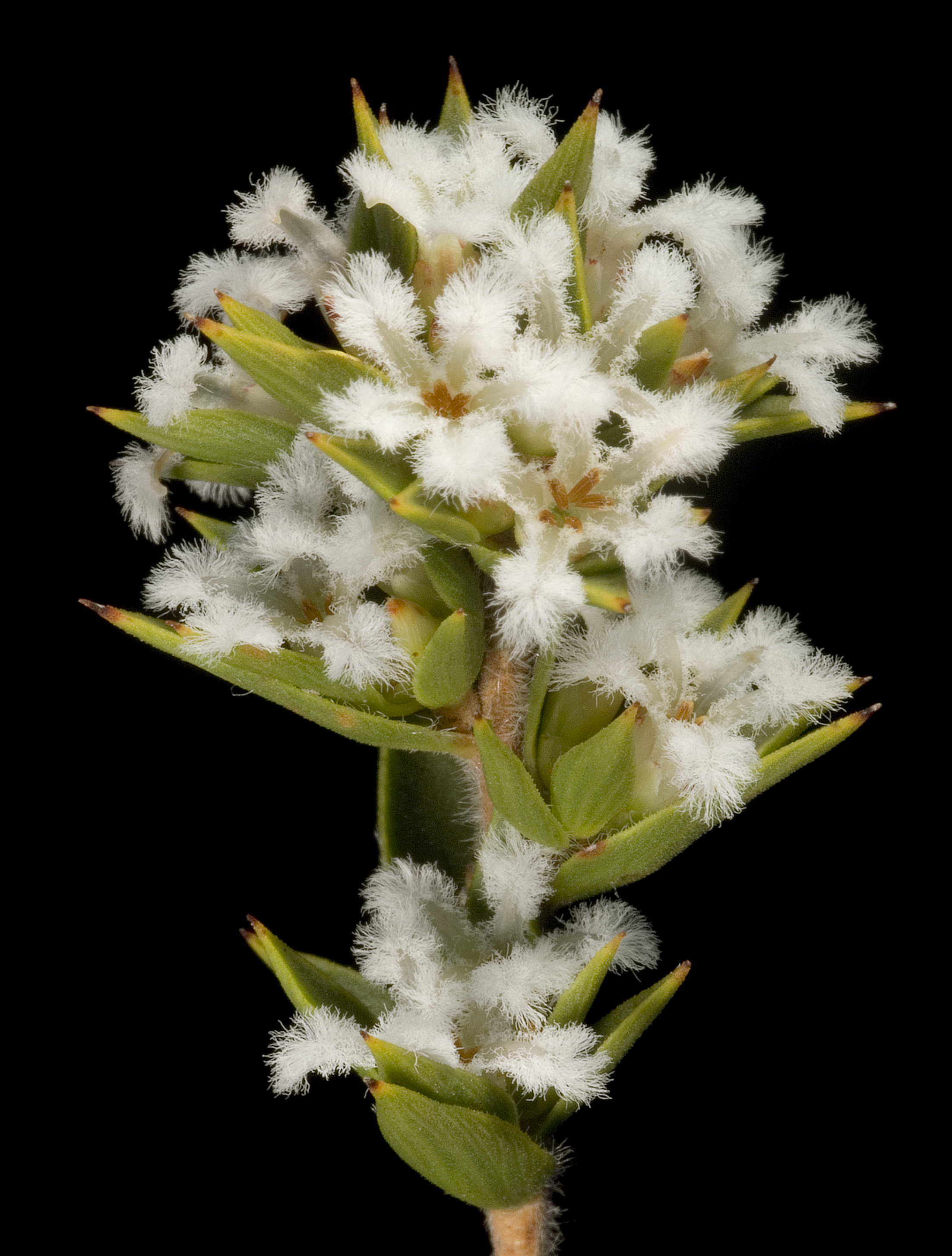

Scientific classification
- Kingdom: Plantae
- Clade: Tracheophytes
- Clade: Angiosperms
- Clade: Eudicots
- Clade: Asterids
- Order: Ericales
- Family: Ericaceae
- Genus: Leucopogon
- Species: L. oliganthus

Binomial name
- Leucopogon oliganthus E.Pritz.
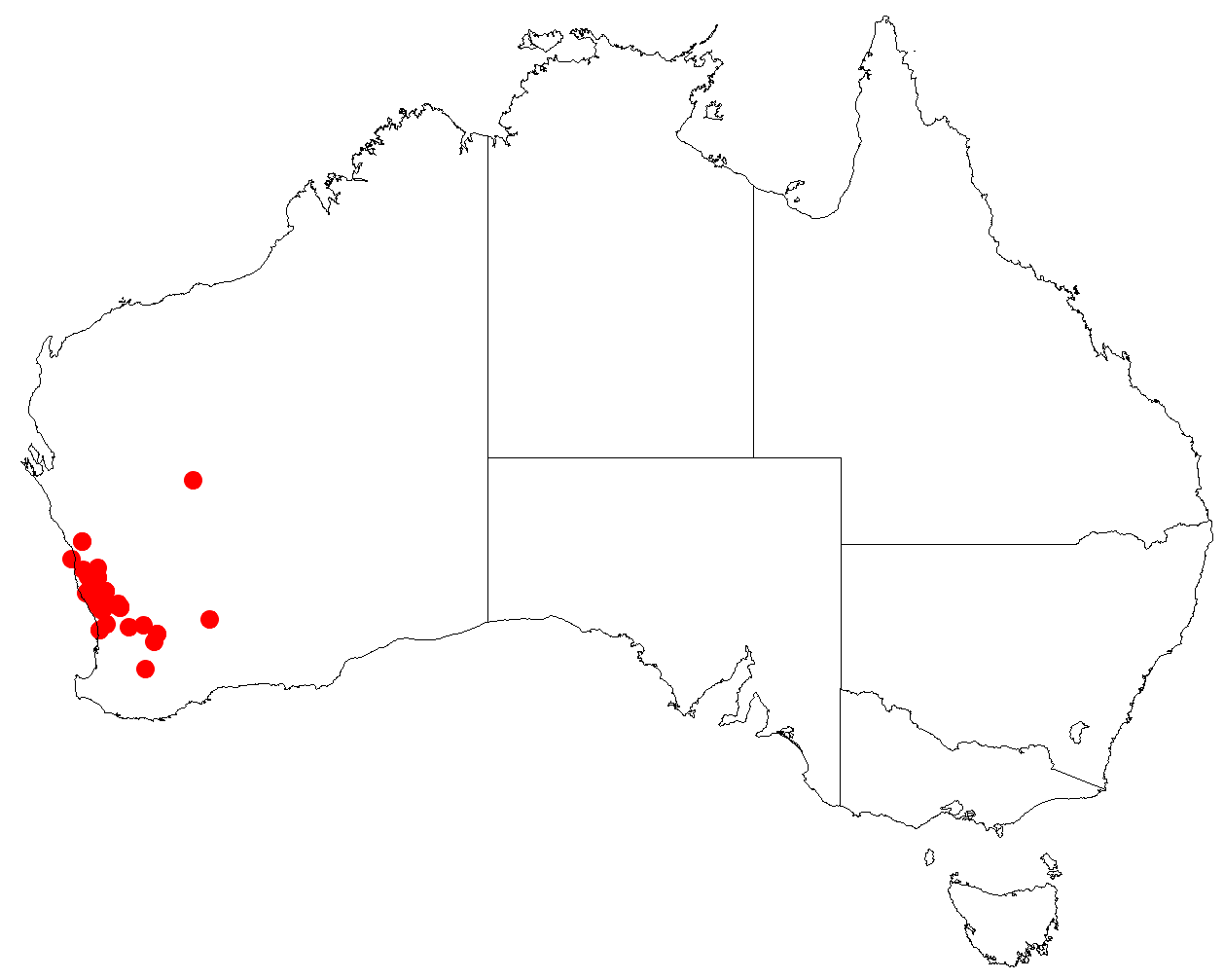
- Occurrence data from AVH

Synonyms
- Styphelia oligantha (E.Pritz.) Sleumer

= Leucopogon oliganthus =

Species of shrub

Leucopogon oliganthus is a species of flowering plant in the heath family Ericaceae and is endemic to the south-west of Western Australia. It is an erect, open shrub with white, tube-shaped flowers from August to November.

It was first formally described in 1904 by Ernst Georg Pritzel in Botanische Jahrbücher für Systematik, Pflanzengeschichte und Pflanzengeographie from specimens collected between Moora and Dandaragan. The specific epithet, oliganthus, derives from the Greek: oligos ("few" or "scanty") and anthos ("flower") to give an adjective describing the plant as having "few or small flowers".

Leucopogon oliganthus grows in sandy soil with lateritic gravel on sandplains and dunes in the Avon Wheatbelt, Geraldton Sandplains, Jarrah Forest and Swan Coastal Plain bioregions of south-western Western Australia, and is listed as "not threatened" by the Government of Western Australia Department of Biodiversity, Conservation and Attractions.
