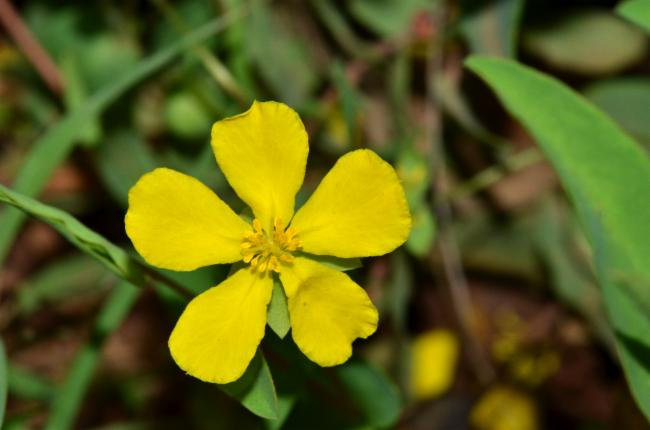

Scientific classification
- Kingdom: Plantae
- Clade: Tracheophytes
- Clade: Angiosperms
- Clade: Eudicots
- Order: Dilleniales
- Family: Dilleniaceae
- Genus: Hibbertia
- Species: H. silvestris

Binomial name
- Hibbertia silvestris Diels

= Hibbertia silvestris =

Species of flowering plant

Hibbertia silvestris is a species of flowering plant in the family Dilleniaceae and is endemic to the south-west of Western Australia. It is a prostrate to more or less erect or spreading shrub with hairy young branchlets, elliptic to egg-shaped leaves with the narrower end towards the base and yellow flowers with seven to ten stamens on one side of two softly-hairy carpels.

== Description ==
Hibbertia silvestris is a prostrate to more or less erect or spreading shrub that typically grows to a height of 20–50 cm (7.9–19.7 in), its young branchlets covered with long, soft hairs and short star-shaped hairs. The leaves are hairy, elliptic to egg-shaped with the narrower end towards the base, mostly 8–10 mm (0.31–0.39 in) long and 3–5 mm (0.12–0.20 in) wide. The flowers are arranged singly in leaf axils on a pedicel 7–15 mm (0.28–0.59 in) long with narrow lance-shaped bracts 5–7 mm (0.20–0.28 in) long at the base. The five sepals are egg-shaped, 4.5–5.5 mm (0.18–0.22 in) long and hairy and the five petals are yellow, 6–8 mm (0.24–0.31 in) long and egg-shaped with the narrower end towards the base. There are seven to ten stamens on one side of the two softly-hairy carpels, and five to twelve staminodes on the other side of the carpels, each carpel with two ovules. Flowering occurs from August to January.

== Taxonomy ==
Hibbertia silvestris was first formally described in 1904 by Ludwig Diels in Botanische Jahrbücher für Systematik, Pflanzengeschichte und Pflanzengeographie. The specific epithet (silvestris) means "living in woods".

== Distribution and habitat ==
This hibbertia grows in moist forest in the Jarrah Forest, Swan Coastal Plain and Warren biogeographic regions of south-western Western Australia.

== See also ==
- List of Hibbertia species
