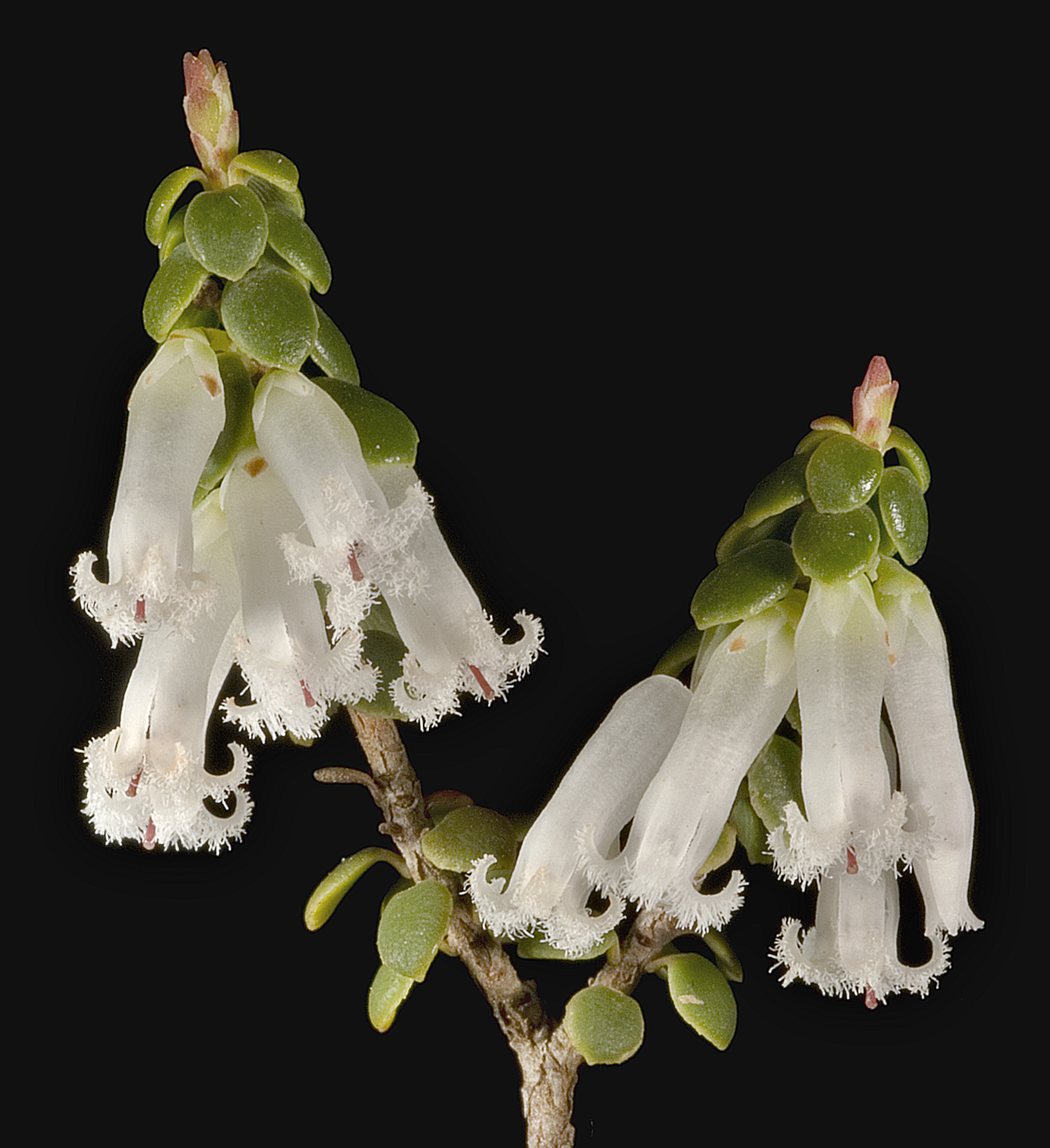

Scientific classification
- Kingdom: Plantae
- Clade: Tracheophytes
- Clade: Angiosperms
- Clade: Eudicots
- Clade: Asterids
- Order: Ericales
- Family: Ericaceae
- Genus: Styphelia
- Species: S. dielsiana

Binomial name
- Styphelia dielsiana E.Pritz.
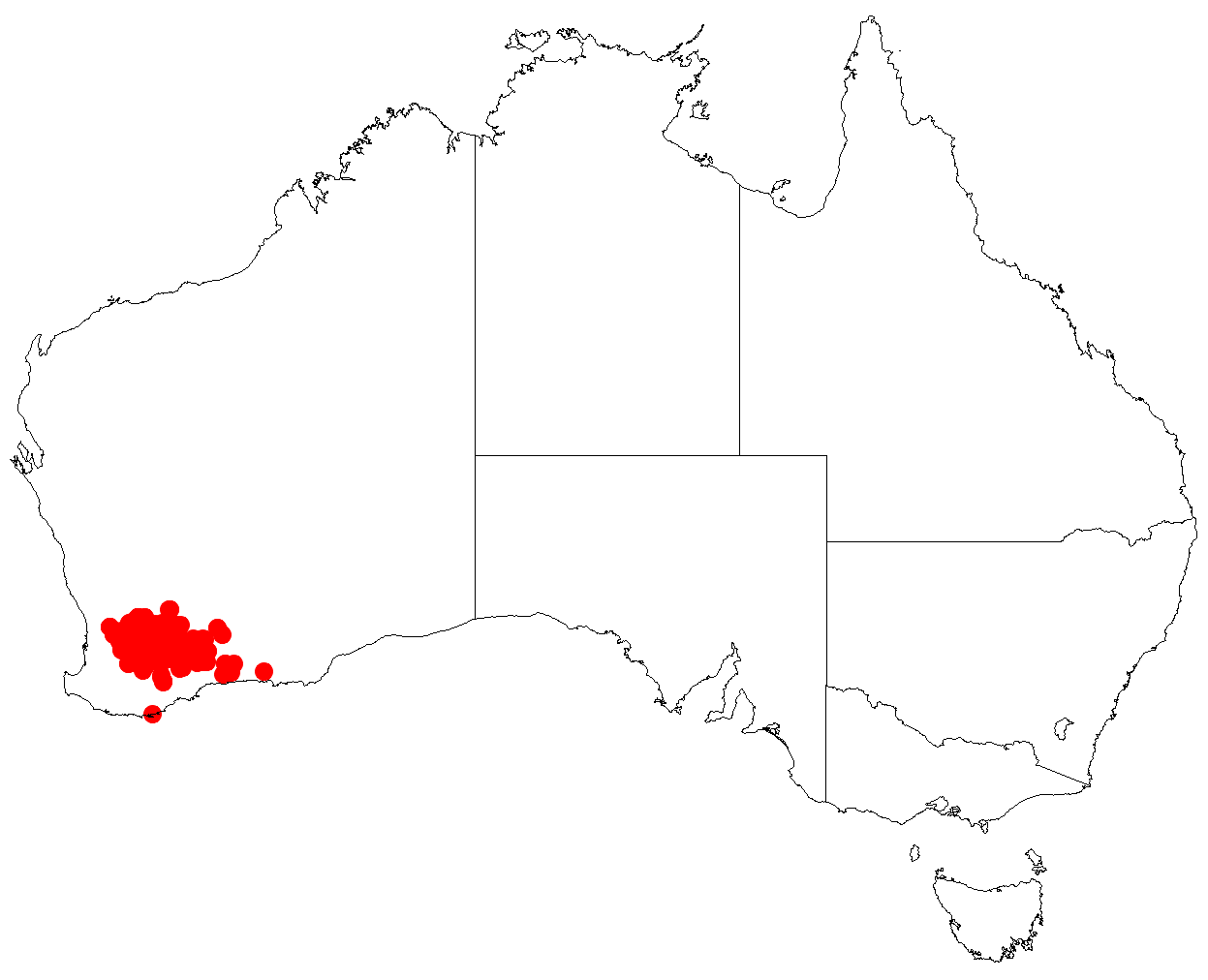
- Occurrence data from AVH

Synonyms
- Leucopogon dielsianus E.Pritz.

= Styphelia dielsiana =

Species of plant

Styphelia dielsiana is a species of flowering plant in the heath family Ericaceae and is endemic to the south-west of Western Australia. It was first formally described in 1904 by Ernst Georg Pritzel in Botanische Jahrbücher für Systematik, Pflanzengeschichte und Pflanzengeographie from specimens collected near Tammin. The specific epithet (dielsiana) honours Ludwig Diels.

Styphelia dielsiana occurs in the Avon Wheatbelt, Coolgardie, Esperance Plains, Jarrah Forest and Mallee bioregions of south-western Western Australia and is listed as "not threatened", by the Government of Western Australia Department of Biodiversity, Conservation and Attractions.
