= Styphelia tamminensis =

Conservation status
- Priority Two — Poorly Known Taxa (DEC)

Scientific classification
- Kingdom: Plantae
- Clade: Tracheophytes
- Clade: Angiosperms
- Clade: Eudicots
- Clade: Asterids
- Order: Ericales
- Family: Ericaceae
- Genus: Styphelia
- Species: S. tamminensis

Binomial name
- Styphelia tamminensis (E.Pritz.) Sleumer

Synonyms
- Leucopogon tamminensis E.Pritz.

Species of shrub

Styphelia tamminensis is a species of flowering plant in the heath family Ericaceae and is endemic to the southwest of Western Australia. It is a slender shrub with many branches, overlapping triangular to egg-shaped leaves and white, tube-shaped flower arranged singly in upper leaf axils.

== Description ==
Styphelia tamminensis is a slender, much-branched undershrub that typically grows to a height of 30–60 cm (12–24 in). Its leaves are sessile, overlap each other and are triangular to egg-shaped, 1.8–2.8 mm (0.071–0.110 in) long and 1.2–1.9 mm (0.047–0.075 in) wide. The leaves are thick and leathery, the upper surface smooth and the lower surface with five to seven thick, parallel ribs. The flowers are arranged singly in upper leaf axils with lance-shaped bracts and broadly egg-shaped bracteoles about 1.5 mm (0.059 in) long. The sepals are 2.3–2.9 mm (0.091–0.114 in) long with reddish-brown tips, and the petals white and joined at the base, forming a cylindrical tube about 50% longer than the sepals, with broadly lance-shaped lobes that are bearded inside.

== Taxonomy ==
This species was first formally described in 1904 by Ernst Georg Pritzel who gave it the name Leucopogon tamminensis in Botanische Jahrbücher für Systematik, Pflanzengeschichte und Pflanzengeographie from a specimen found on sand-dunes near Tammin. In 1963, Hermann Otto Sleumer transferred the species to Styphelia as S. tamminensis. The specific epithet, (tamminensis) means "native of Tammin".

In the same journal, Pritzel described the variety australis, but 2020, Michael Clyde Hislop, Darren M. Crayn and Caroline Puente-Lelievre raised the variety to species status. Since the name Styphelia australis was used for a different species, (Styphelia australis (R.Br.) F.Muell., now known as Leucopogon australis R.Br.) the new species was given the name Styphelia decussata.

== Distribution ==
This leucopogon is found in the Avon Wheatbelt and Esperance Plains IBRA Regions in the south-west of Western Australia.

== Conservation status ==
Styphelia tamminensis is listed as "Priority Two" by the Western Australian Government Department of Biodiversity, Conservation and Attractions, meaning that it is poorly known and from only one or a few locations.
