= Styphelia hispida =

Scientific classification
- Kingdom: Plantae
- Clade: Tracheophytes
- Clade: Angiosperms
- Clade: Eudicots
- Clade: Asterids
- Order: Ericales
- Family: Ericaceae
- Genus: Styphelia
- Species: S. hispida

Binomial name
- Styphelia hispida (E.Pritz.) Sleumer
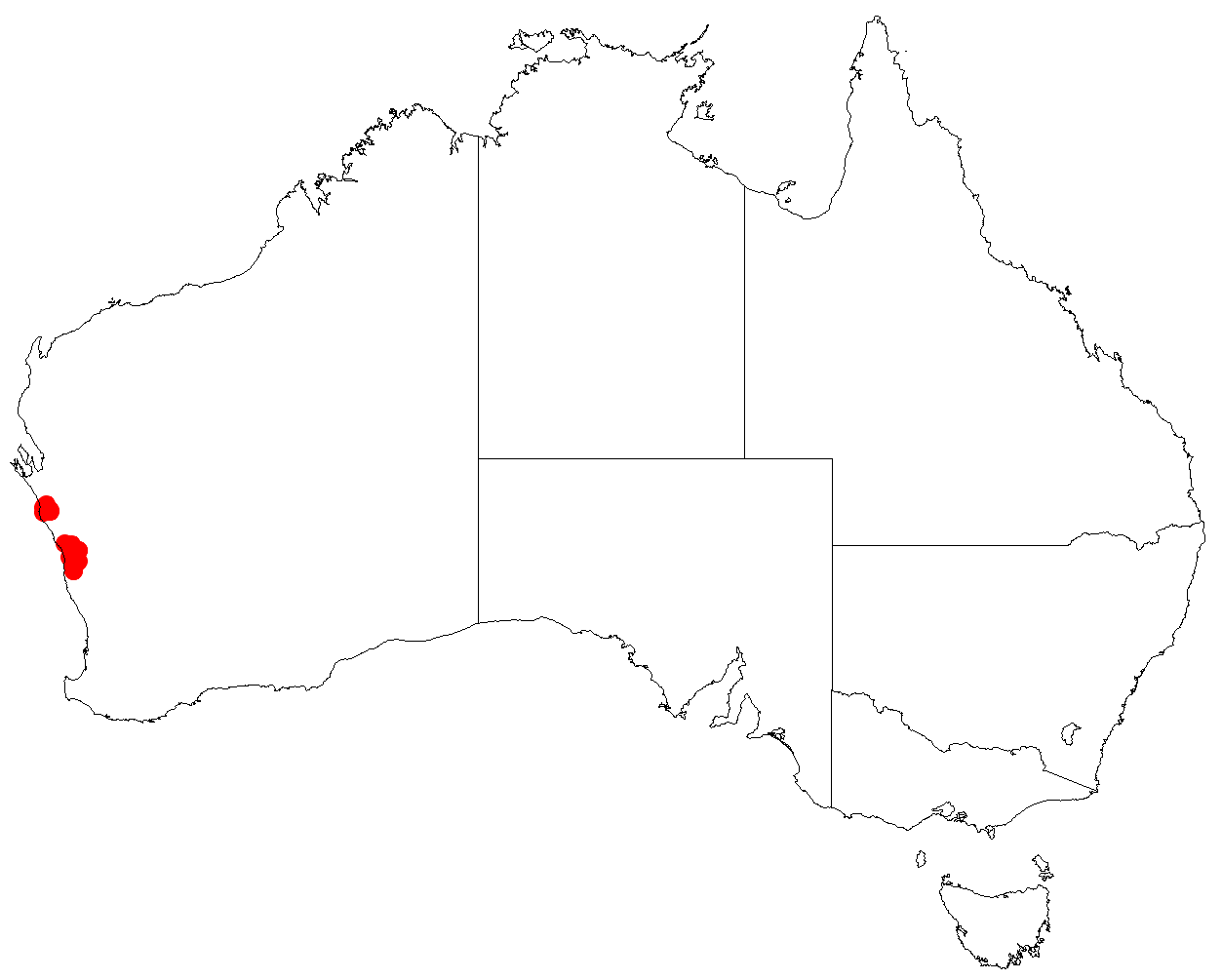
- Occurrence data from AVH

Synonyms
- Leucopogon hispidus E.Pritz.

Species of plant

Styphelia hispida is a species of flowering plant in the heath family Ericaceae and is endemic to the south-west of Western Australia. It was first formally described in 1904 by Ernst Georg Pritzel who gave it the name Leucopogon hispidus in Botanische Jahrbücher für Systematik, Pflanzengeschichte und Pflanzengeographie from specimens collected near Mingenew. In 1963, Hermann Otto Sleumer transferred the species to Styphelia as S. hispida in the journal Blumea. The specific epithet (hispida) means "with prickly hairs", referring to the leaves.

Styphelia hispida occurs in the Avon Wheatbelt and Geraldton Sandplains bioregions of south-western Western Australia and is listed as "not threatened", by the Government of Western Australia Department of Biodiversity, Conservation and Attractions.
