= Ptilotus chortophytus =

Conservation status
- Priority One — Poorly Known Taxa (DEC)

Scientific classification
- Kingdom: Plantae
- Clade: Tracheophytes
- Clade: Angiosperms
- Clade: Eudicots
- Order: Caryophyllales
- Family: Amaranthaceae
- Genus: Ptilotus
- Species: P. chortophytus

Binomial name
- Ptilotus chortophytus Diels (Schinz)

Synonyms
- Ptilotus chortophytum J.W.Green orth. var.; Trichinium chortophytum Diels

Species of grass-like plant

Ptilotus chortophytus is a species of flowering plant in the family Amaranthaceae and is endemic to Western Australia. It is a perennial herb, with leaves that are hairy at first, later glabrous, and oval or cylindrical spikes of green or yellow flowers.

== Description ==
Ptilotus chortophytus is a prostrate perennial herb with several stems that are hairy at first, later glabrous. Its leaves are egg-shaped, 4–35 mm (0.16–1.38 in) long and 1–5 mm (0.039–0.197 in) wide. The flowers are densely arranged in oval or cylindrical, green or yellow spikes. The bracts are 3.2–6 mm (0.13–0.24 in) long and the bracteoles 3–5 mm (0.12–0.20 in) long and awned with a prominent midrib. The outer tepals are 6.7–7.6 mm (0.26–0.30 in) long, the inner tepals 6.2–7.2 mm (0.24–0.28 in) long with a tuft of hairs. The style is 4.5–5.0 mm (0.18–0.20 in) long, S-shaped and obliquely fixed to the ovary.

== Taxonomy ==
This species was first formally described in 1904 by Ludwig Diels who gave it the name Trichinium chortophytum in Botanische Jahrbücher für Systematik, Pflanzengeschichte und Pflanzengeographie from specimens collected between Northampton and Port Gregory. In 1934 Hans Schinz transferred the species to Ptilotus as P. chortophytus. The specific epithet (chortophytus) means 'fodder plant'.

== Distribution and habitat ==
Ptilotus chortophytus occurs in the Geraldton Sandplains bioregion of Western Australia.

== Conservation status ==
This species of Ptilotus is listed as "Priority One" by the Government of Western Australia Department of Biodiversity, Conservation and Attractions, meaning that it is known from only one or a few locations where it is potentially at risk.

== See also ==
- List of Ptilotus species
