= Leucopogon mollis =

Scientific classification
- Kingdom: Plantae
- Clade: Tracheophytes
- Clade: Angiosperms
- Clade: Eudicots
- Clade: Asterids
- Order: Ericales
- Family: Ericaceae
- Genus: Leucopogon
- Species: L. mollis

Binomial name
- Leucopogon mollis E.Pritz.
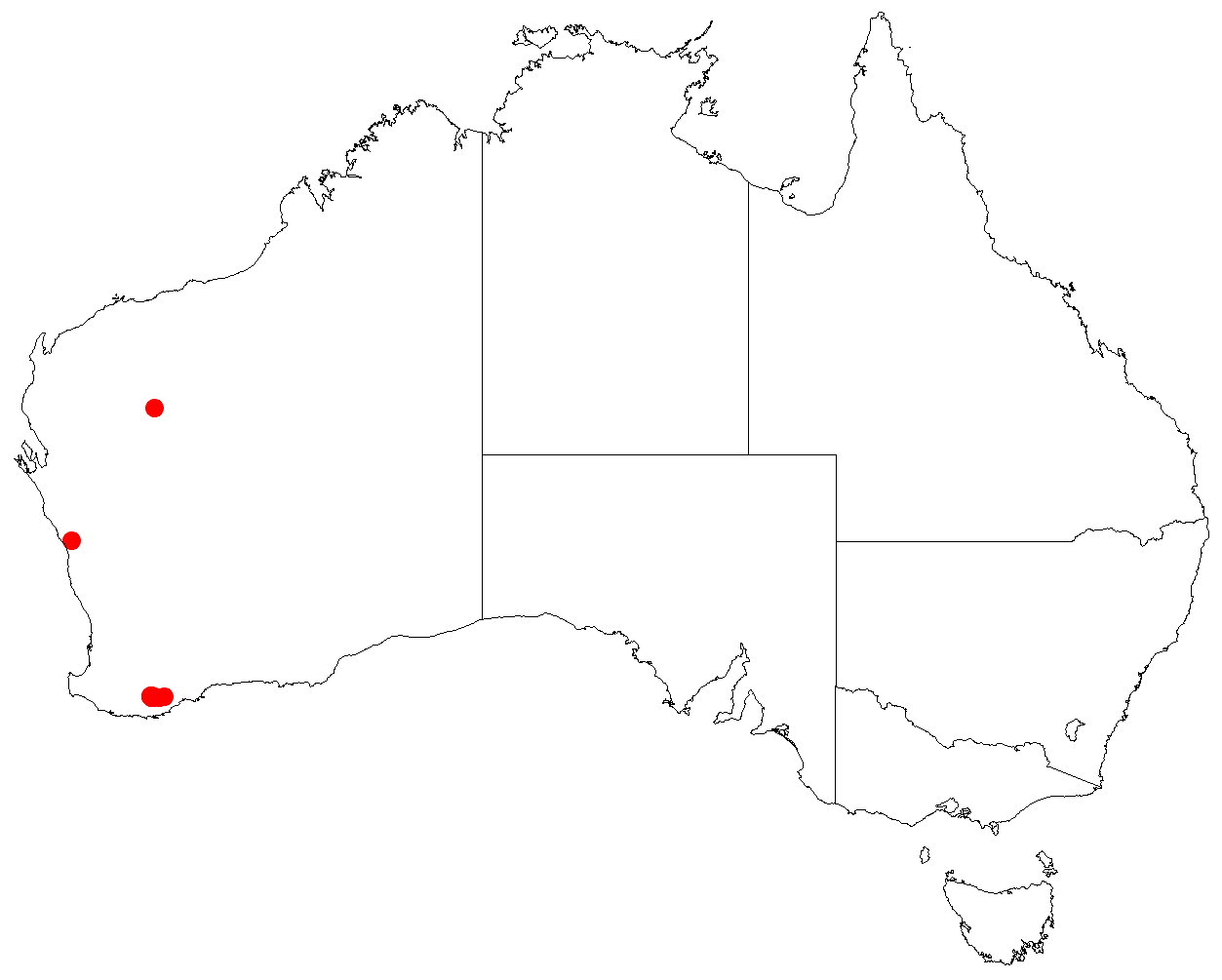
- Occurrence data from AVH

Synonyms
- Styphelia mollis (E.Pritz.) Sleumer

Species of plant

Leucopogon mollis is a species of flowering plant in the heath family Ericaceae and is endemic to the south-west of Western Australia. It is a slender, diffuse shrub that typically grows to a height of 0.3–1 m (1 ft 0 in – 3 ft 3 in) and has white, tube-shaped flowers. The species was first formally described in 1904 by Ernst Georg Pritzel in Botanische Jahrbücher für Systematik, Pflanzengeschichte und Pflanzengeographie from specimens collected on the summit of "Mount Mongerup" in the Stirling Range. The specific epithet (mollis) means "soft".

Leucopogon mollis is found in the Stirling Range National Park in the Esperance Plains bioregion of south-western Western Australia where it grows on rocky slopes. It is listed as "not threatened", by the Government of Western Australia Department of Biodiversity, Conservation and Attractions.
