= Styphelia hamulosa =

Scientific classification
- Kingdom: Plantae
- Clade: Tracheophytes
- Clade: Angiosperms
- Clade: Eudicots
- Clade: Asterids
- Order: Ericales
- Family: Ericaceae
- Genus: Styphelia
- Species: S. hamulosa

Binomial name
- Styphelia hamulosa (E.Pritz.) Sleumer
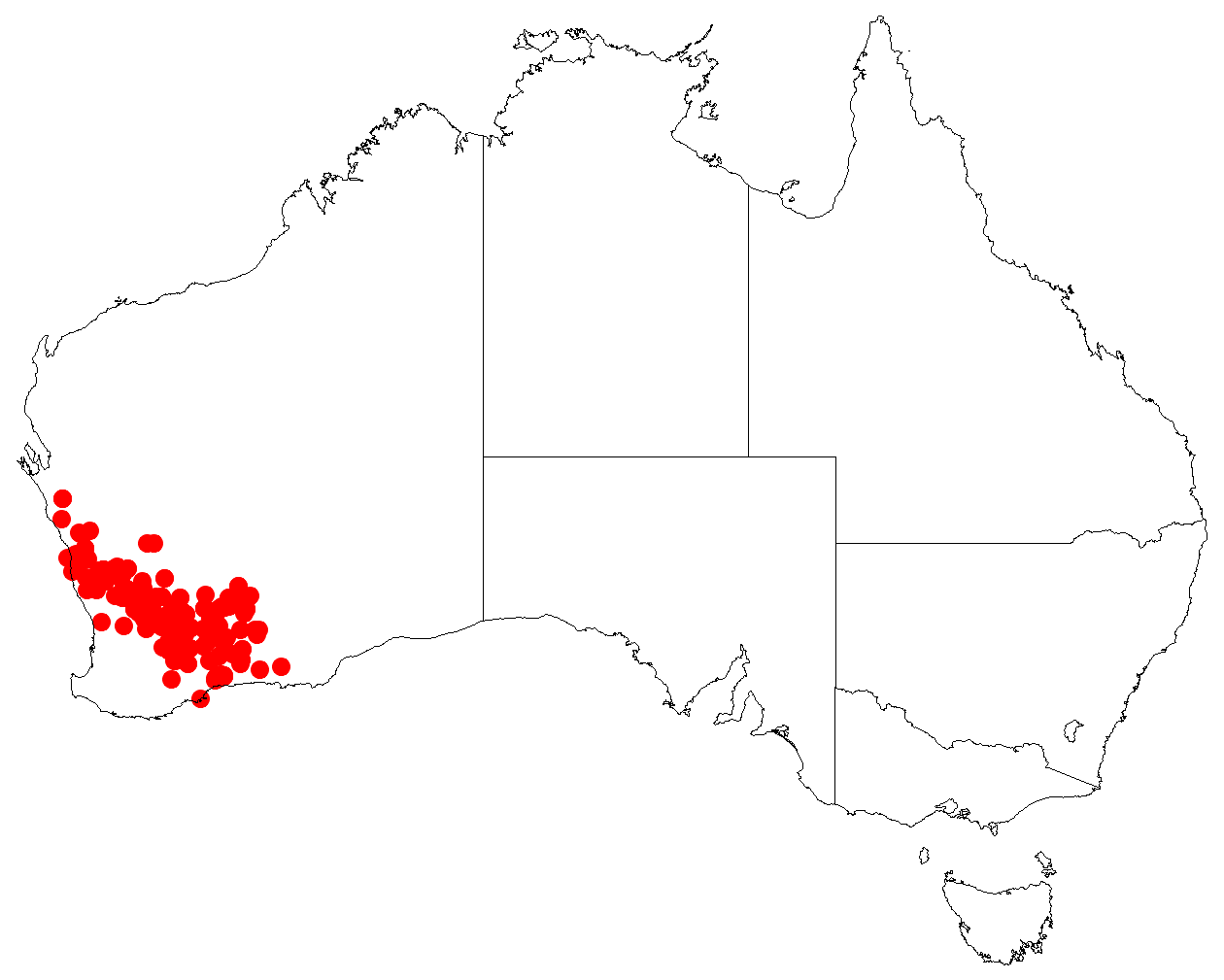
- Occurrence data from AVH

Synonyms
- Leucopogon hamulosus E.Pritz.

Species of plant

Styphelia hamulosa is a species of flowering plant in the heath family Ericaceae and is endemic to the south-west of Western Australia. It was first formally described in 1904 by Ernst Georg Pritzel who gave it the name Leucopogon hamulosus in Botanische Jahrbücher für Systematik, Pflanzengeschichte und Pflanzengeographie from specimens he collected near Mingenew. In 1963, Hermann Otto Sleumer transferred the species to Styphelia as S. hamulosa in the journal Blumea. The specific epithet (hamulosa) means "having small hooks" referring to the tips of the leaves.

Styphelia hamulosa occurs in the Avon Wheatbelt, Coolgardie, Esperance Plains, Geraldton Sandplains, Mallee, Murchison and Swan Coastal Plain bioregions of south-western Western Australia and is listed as "not threatened", by the Government of Western Australia Department of Biodiversity, Conservation and Attractions.
