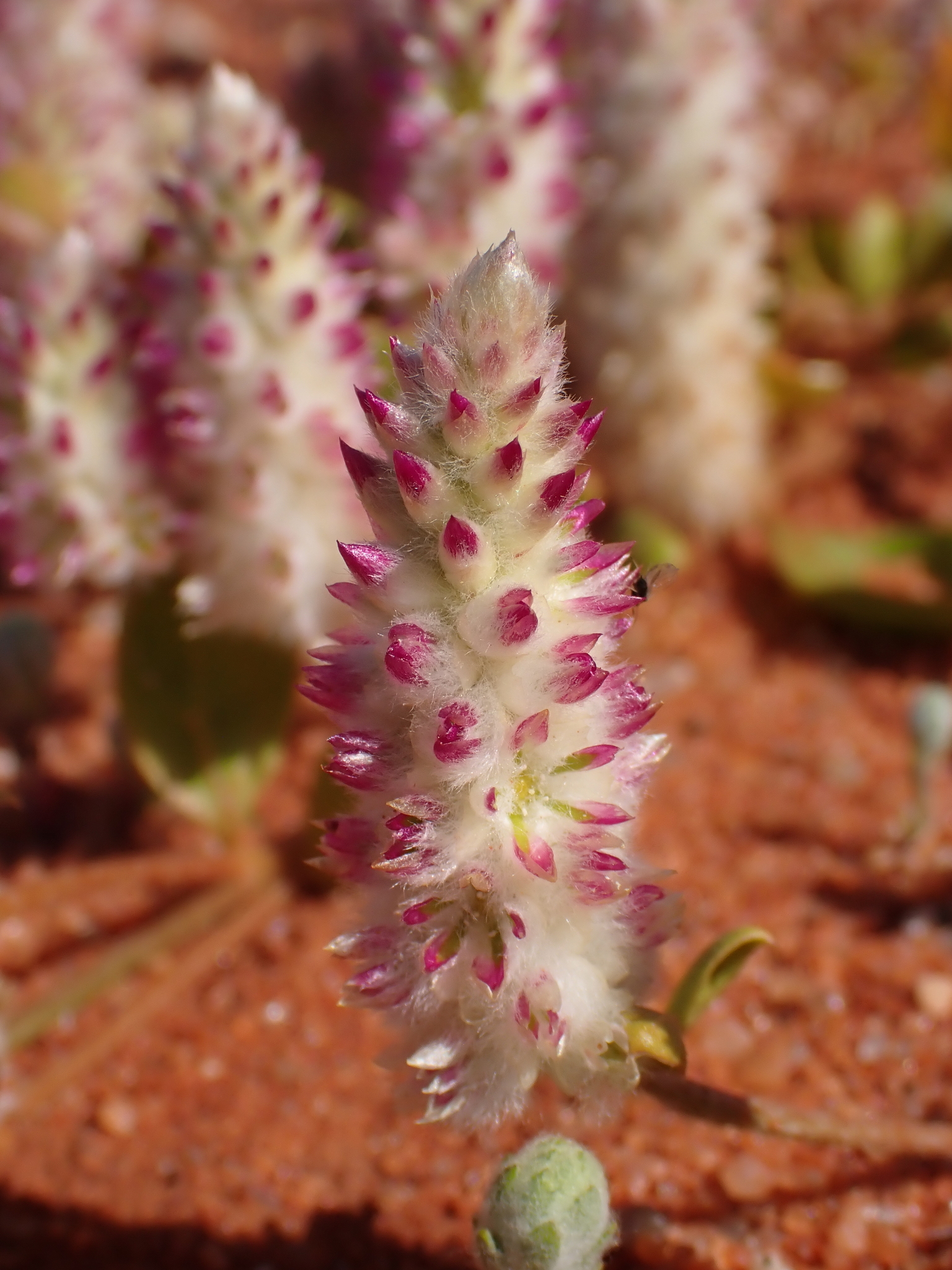

Scientific classification
- Kingdom: Plantae
- Clade: Tracheophytes
- Clade: Angiosperms
- Clade: Eudicots
- Order: Caryophyllales
- Family: Amaranthaceae
- Genus: Ptilotus
- Species: P. chamaecladus

Binomial name
- Ptilotus chamaecladus Diels

Synonyms
- Ptilotus latifolius subsp. chamaecladus (Diels) Benl nom. inval.; Ptilotus latifolius var. chamaecladus (Diels) C.A.Gardner ex Benl

= Ptilotus chamaecladus =

Species of grass-like plant

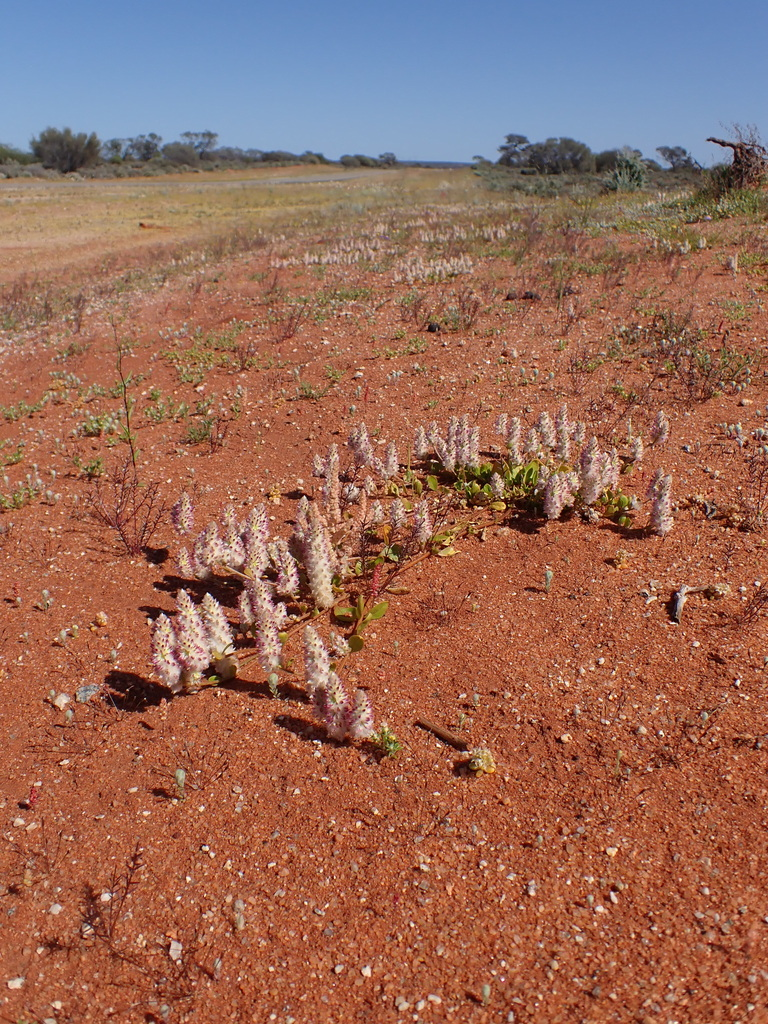
Habit near Paynes Find

Ptilotus chamaecladus is a species of flowering plant in the family Amaranthaceae and is endemic to Western Australia. It is a prostrate spreading to ascending annual herb, with leaves that are hairy at first, later glabrous, and oval or cylindrical spikes of purple-mauve flowers.

== Description ==
Ptilotus chamaecladus is a prostrate spreading to ascending annual herb that typically grows to 5–60 cm (2.0–23.6 in) high with several stems that are hairy at first, later glabrous. Its leaves are egg-shaped, 4–130 mm (0.16–5.12 in) long and 1–48 mm (0.039–1.890 in) wide. The flowers are densely arranged in oval or cylindrical, purple-mauve spikes. The bracts are dark brown, 4–5.6 mm (0.16–0.22 in) long and the bracteoles 3.5–4.6 mm (0.14–0.18 in) long but not awned. The outer tepals are 5.5–5.9 mm (0.22–0.23 in) long, the inner tepals 5.4–5.7 mm (0.21–0.22 in) long. The style is 1.9–2.6 mm (0.075–0.102 in) long, curved and eccentrically fixed to the ovary. Flowering occurs from July to December.

== Taxonomy ==
Ptilotus chamaecladus was first formally described in 1904 by Ludwig Diels in Botanische Jahrbücher für Systematik, Pflanzengeschichte und Pflanzengeographie from specimens collected near Carnarvon. The specific epithet (chamaecladus) means 'branch-on-the-earth'.

== Distribution and habitat ==
Ptilotus chamaecladus grows on floodplains, creek beds and claypans in the Avon Wheatbelt, Carnarvon, Coolgardie, Gascoyne, Geraldton Sandplains, Gibson Desert, Great Victoria Desert, Little Sandy Desert, Murchison, Pilbara and Yalgoo bioregions of Western Australia.

== Conservation status ==
This species of Ptilotus is listed as "not threatened" by the Government of Western Australia Department of Biodiversity, Conservation and Attractions.

== See also ==
- List of Ptilotus species
