= Jacksonia eremodendron =

Scientific classification
- Kingdom: Plantae
- Clade: Tracheophytes
- Clade: Angiosperms
- Clade: Eudicots
- Clade: Rosids
- Order: Fabales
- Family: Fabaceae
- Subfamily: Faboideae
- Genus: Jacksonia
- Species: J. eremodendron

Binomial name
- Jacksonia eremodendron E.Pritz.

Species of legume

Jacksonia eremodendron is a species of flowering plant in the family Fabaceae and is endemic to the south-west of Western Australia. It is a straggling shrub to small tree, the end branches egg-shaped, elliptic or oblong phylloclades with sharply-pointed teeth on the edges, the flowers yellow-orange with red markings and attached to teeth on phylloclades, and woody, densely-hairy pods.

== Description ==
Jacksonia eremodendron is a straggling shrub to small tree that typically grows up to 2–3 m (6 ft 7 in – 9 ft 10 in) high and about 1 m (3 ft 3 in) wide, its branches greyish-green and prominently ribbed. Its end branches are egg-shaped, elliptic or oblong phyllodes, 43–172 mm (1.7–6.8 in) long and 10–21 mm (0.39–0.83 in) wide with sharply-pointed teeth on the edges. Its leaves are reduced to reddish brown, egg-shaped scales, 1.5–4.6 mm (0.059–0.181 in) long and 0.9–3 mm (0.035–0.118 in) wide, but that eventually fall off. The flowers are arranged singly on the nodes of the phylloclades, each flower on a pedicel 3.6–6 mm (0.14–0.24 in) long. There are narrowly elliptic bracteoles 1.1–2.8 mm (0.043–0.110 in) long, 0.4–1 mm (0.016–0.039 in) wide and with toothed edges, but fall off as the flowers develop. The floral tube is 1.2–1.3 mm (0.047–0.051 in) long and ribbed. The sepals are membranous, the lobes 9.7–12.8 mm (0.38–0.50 in) long and 1.1–2.0 mm (0.043–0.079 in) wide and fused at the base for 0.4–0.65 mm (0.016–0.026 in). The standard petal is yellow-orange with red markings, 6.6–7.1 mm (0.26–0.28 in) long and 3.8–6.9 mm (0.15–0.27 in) deep, the wings yellow-orange with red markings, 6.3–6.8 mm (0.25–0.27 in) long, and the keel is red, 7.5–7.6 mm (0.30–0.30 in) long. The stamens have pale pink filaments 7.5–10.6 mm (0.30–0.42 in) long. Flowering occurs from October to January, and the fruit is a woody, densely hairy, compressed elliptic pod, 11.4–15 mm (0.45–0.59 in) long and 4.4–7 mm (0.17–0.28 in) wide.

== Taxonomy ==
Jacksonia eremodendron was first formally described in 1904 by Ernst Georg Pritzel in Botanische Jahrbücher für Systematik, Pflanzengeschichte und Pflanzengeographie. The specific epithet (eremodendron) means 'lonely tree'.

== Distribution and habitat ==
This species of Jacksonia grows in low woodland or tall shrubland in sandy soil between Three Springs and Moora in the Avon Wheatbelt, Geraldton Sandplains and Swan Coastal Plain bioregions of south-western Western Australia.

== Conservation status ==
Jacksonia eremodendron is listed as "not threatened" by the Government of Western Australia Department of Biodiversity, Conservation and Attractions.
