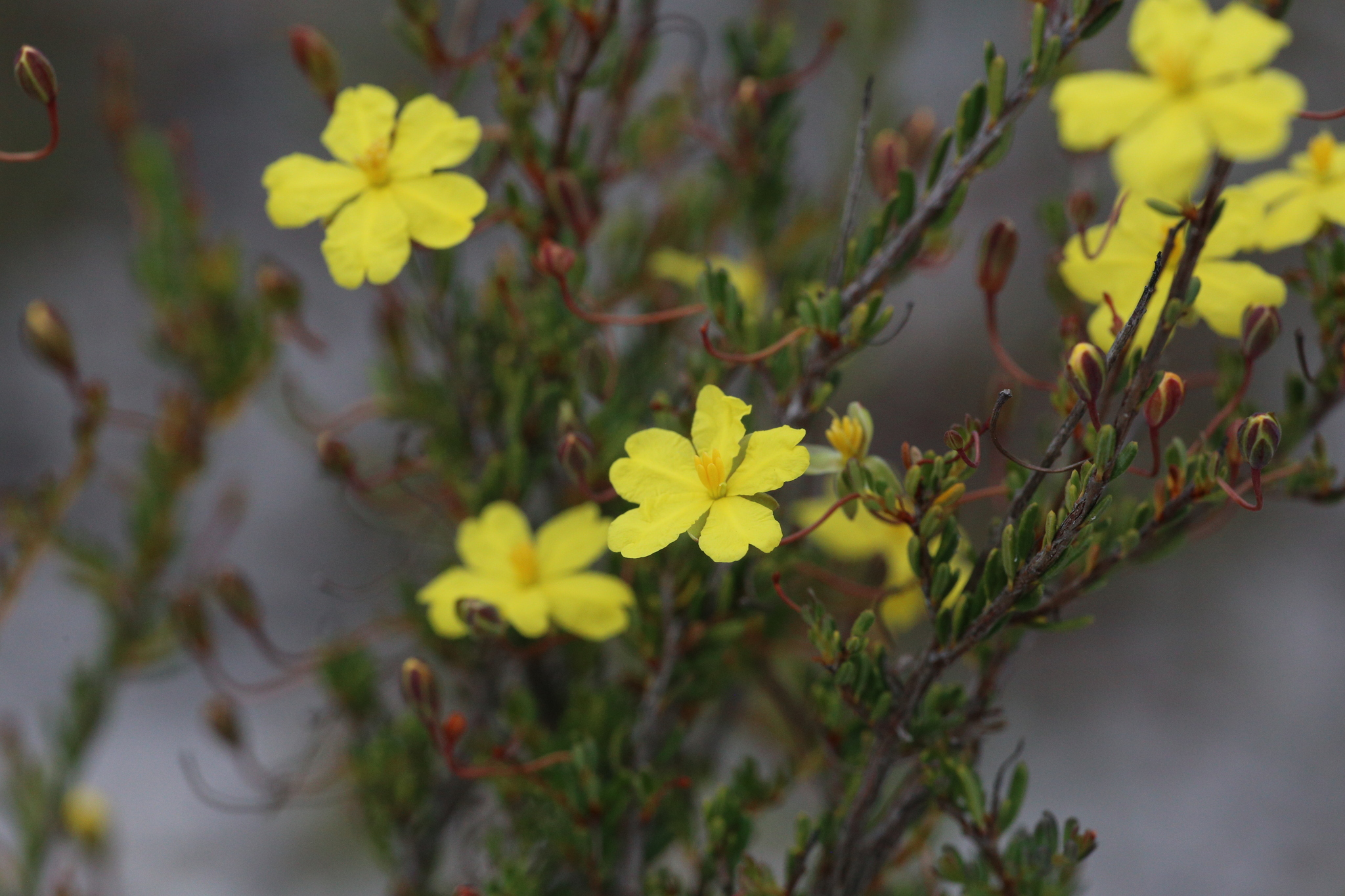

Scientific classification
- Kingdom: Plantae
- Clade: Tracheophytes
- Clade: Angiosperms
- Clade: Eudicots
- Order: Dilleniales
- Family: Dilleniaceae
- Genus: Hibbertia
- Species: H. andrewsiana

Binomial name
- Hibbertia andrewsiana Diels

= Hibbertia andrewsiana =

Species of flowering plant

Hibbertia andrewsiana is a species of flowering plant in the family Dilleniaceae and is endemic to the south-west of Western Australia. It is a shrub with an erect or spreading habit and typically grows to a height of 15–60 cm (5.9–23.6 in). It blooms between September and January and produces yellow flowers.

The species was first formally described in 1904 by the botanist Ludwig Diels in Engler's Botanische Jahrbücher für Systematik, Pflanzengeschichte und Pflanzengeographie from specimens collected near Esperance.

The specific epithet (andrewsiana) honours Cecil Rollo Payton Andrews (1870 to 1951), a schoolteacher and later director of Education in Western Australia. He was also an avid plant collector and served as the President of the Western Australian Natural History Society.

The species has a small and scattered distribution along the south coast of the Goldfields-Esperance region of Western Australia between Ravensthorpe to just east of Esperance where it is found on rocky slopes and undulating plains growing in sandy soils.

== See also ==
- List of Hibbertia species
