= Salix cathayana =

Scientific classification
- Kingdom: Plantae
- Clade: Tracheophytes
- Clade: Angiosperms
- Clade: Eudicots
- Clade: Rosids
- Order: Malpighiales
- Family: Salicaceae
- Genus: Salix
- Species: S. cathayana

Binomial name
- Salix cathayana Diels

Shrub in the genus of willows

Salix cathayana is a strongly branched shrub from the genus of the willow (Salix) with brown or gray-brown, young tomentose hairy branches. The leaf blades have lengths of 1.5 to 5.2 centimeters. The natural range of the species is in the north of China.

== Description ==
Salix cathayana is a strongly branched shrub up to 1.5 meters high. The twigs are brown or gray-brown, and young twigs are tomentose. The buds are egg-shaped to elongated, tomentose and have a blunt tip. The leaves have a 2 to 5 millimeter long, finely hairy petiole. The leaf blade is elliptical or elliptical-lanceolate, 1.5 to 5.2 inches long and 0.6 to 1.5 inches wide, entire, with a blunt or pointed tip and a blunt or pointed base. The upper side of the leaf is dull green and sometimes tomentose, the underside is blue-green.

The male inflorescences are 2 to 3.5 centimeters long and 5 to 8 millimeters in diameter, dense-flowered catkins. The inflorescence stalk is 0.5 to 1.5 inches long, shaggy and hairy and forms three or more leaves. The bracts are yellowish brown, ovate or obovate, ciliate and have a rounded tip. Male flowers have an adaxial, ovoid-elongated nectar gland. The two stamens stand free, the stamens are three to four times longer than the bracts and partly sparsely hairy with long downy hair. The anthers are yellow, egg-shaped or almost round. The female catkins are 2 to 3 seldom up to 5 centimeters long, densely flowered and with short stems. The bracts are obovate-oblong and ciliate. Female flowers have an adaxial nectar gland. The ovary is elliptical, about 3 millimeters long, glabrous and sessile. The pen is short and two columns, the scar is short and bilobed. Round, seated or almost seated capsules are formed as fruits. Salix cathayana flowers in May, and the fruits ripen in June and July.

== Range ==
The natural range is in the Chinese provinces of Guizhou, Hebei, Henan, Hubei, Shaanxi, Sichuan, and Yunnan. It grows in thickets on mountain slopes and in valleys at altitudes of 1800 to 3000 meters.

== Taxonomy ==
Salix cathayana is a kind from the kind of willow (Salix), in the family of the pasture plants (Salicaceae). There, it is the section Denticulatae assigned. It was in 1912 by Ludwig Diels scientifically for the first time described. The genus name Salix is Latin and has been from the Romans used for various willow species. The specific epithet cathayanarefers to the origin of the species from China. It is derived from Cathay, an empire established in the 10th century by Mongol tribes in northern China.

A synonym of the species is Salix hsinhsuaniana Fang.

== Literature ==
- Wu Zheng-yi, Peter H. Raven (Ed.): Flora of China. Volume 4: Cycadaceae through Fagaceae. Science Press / Missouri Botanical Garden Press, Beijing / St. Louis 1999, ISBN 0-915279-70-3, pp. 195, 205 (English).
- Helmut Genaust: Etymological dictionary of botanical plant names. 3rd, completely revised and expanded edition. Nikol, Hamburg 2005, ISBN 3-937872-16-7, pp. 135, 552 (reprint from 1996).
