= Francisco Sánchez-Bayo =

Spanish ecologist

- Born: Candelario, Spain
- Education: MSc, environmental sciences, Autonomous University of Madrid (UAM), 1980; PhD, ecology, UAM, 1985; Diploma, applied science, University of New South Wales, 1990
- Occupation: Ecologist
- Employer: University of Sydney

Francisco Sánchez-Bayo is an environmental scientist and ecologist at the University of Sydney. The author or co-author of over 80 articles and book chapters, Sánchez-Bayo's research interests have focused on the ecological effects of pesticides. In 2019 he was the lead author of a study that predicted the large-scale extinction of insect species. He serves on the board of associate editors of the journal Entomologia Generalis.

== Early life and education ==
Born in Candelario, Spain, Sánchez-Bayo got his master's degree in environmental sciences at the Autonomous University of Madrid (UAM) in 1980, and his doctorate in ecology in 1985, also at UAM, for a thesis entitled "Analysis of the spatial and temporal organisation of a bird community in riverine forests of the Duero basin". In 1990 he received a diploma in applied science, specializing in arid lands management, from the University of New South Wales.

== Career ==
Sánchez-Bayo worked as an assistant professor at Chiba University in Japan for five years from 2001, before taking up a position at the Centre for Ecotoxicology in the Office of the Environment & Heritage of New South Wales, Australia. As of February 2019 he is an honorary associate at the Sydney Institute of Agriculture at the University of Sydney. Sánchez-Bayo was the lead author of a study published in the journal Biological Conservation in 2019 that indicated there has been a dramatic decline in insect populations and predicting the large-scale extinction of insect species, as a result of "the loss of habitat, due to agricultural practices, urbanisation and deforestation".
