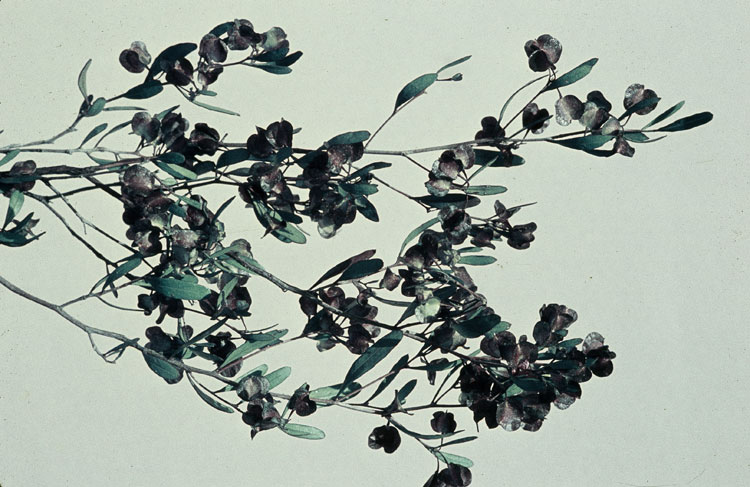

Scientific classification
- Kingdom: Plantae
- Clade: Tracheophytes
- Clade: Angiosperms
- Clade: Eudicots
- Clade: Rosids
- Order: Sapindales
- Family: Sapindaceae
- Genus: Dodonaea
- Species: D. amblyophylla

Binomial name
- Dodonaea amblyophylla Diels

= Dodonaea amblyophylla =

Species of shrub

Dodonaea amblyophylla is a species of plant in the family Sapindaceae and is endemic to the south-west of Western Australia. It is an erect shrub with simple, linear leaves, flowers in groups of four to six, usually with eight stamens, and capsules with three wings.

== Description ==
Dodonaea amblyophylla is usually a dioecious, erect shrub that typically grows to a height of up to 2 m (6 ft 7 in). The leaves are simple, linear to oblong, 22–45 mm (0.87–1.77 in) long, 4–10 mm (0.16–0.39 in) wide and glabrous. The flowers are borne in cymes in leaf axils or on the ends of branches, each flower on a pedicel 4.0–7.5 mm (0.16–0.30 in) long, with four linear to lance-shaped sepals 1.6–2.0 mm (0.063–0.079 in) long, but that fall off as the flowers open. There are usually eight stamens and a glabrous ovary. Flowering occurs from January to March and the fruit is a three-winged, broadly oblong or egg-shaped capsule 7.5–12 mm (0.30–0.47 in) long and 7–17 mm (0.28–0.67 in) wide, with membranous wings 1–4 mm (0.039–0.157 in) wide.

== Taxonomy and naming ==
Dodonaea amblyophylla was first formally described in 1904 by Ludwig Diels in the journal Botanische Jahrbücher fur Systematik. The specific epithet (amblyophylla) means 'blunt-leaved'.

== Distribution and habitat ==
This species of Dodonaea grows in semi-arid to arid mallee scrub, in sandy soils, between Menzies to Corrigin, and south to the south coast and east to Madura.
