= Goodenia eremophila =

Scientific classification
- Kingdom: Plantae
- Clade: Tracheophytes
- Clade: Angiosperms
- Clade: Eudicots
- Clade: Asterids
- Order: Asterales
- Family: Goodeniaceae
- Genus: Goodenia
- Species: G. eremophila

Binomial name
- Goodenia eremophila E.Pritz.

Species of plant

Goodenia eremophila is a species of flowering plant in the family Goodeniaceae and is endemic to inland areas of Western Australia. It is an ascending herb with linear to elliptic leaves and thyrses of blue flowers.

== Description ==
Goodenia eremophila is an ascending herb that typically grows to a height of 30–60 cm (12–24 in) with purplish glandular hairs. The leaves are linear to egg-shaped with the narrower end towards the base, 60–90 mm (2.4–3.5 in) long and 15–20 mm (0.59–0.79 in) wide, sometimes with teeth on the edges. The flowers are arranged in thyrses up to 350 mm (14 in) long on a peduncle 10–40 mm (0.39–1.57 in) long with leaf-like bracts at the base. The sepals are lance-shaped, 3–4 mm (0.12–0.16 in) long, the corolla blue and up to 20 mm (0.79 in) long. The lower lobes of the corolla are 6–7 mm (0.24–0.28 in) long with wings about 2 mm (0.079 in) wide. Flowering occurs from October to December and the fruit is an oval capsule 9–12 mm (0.35–0.47 in) long.

== Taxonomy and naming ==
Goodenia eremophila was first formally described in 1905 by Ernst Georg Pritzel in Botanische Jahrbücher für Systematik, Pflanzengeschichte und Pflanzengeographie. The specific epithet (eremophila) means "solitary-loving".

== Distribution and habitat ==
This goodenia grows in sandy soli between Wiluna and Kalgoorlie in the Great Victoria Desert, Little Sandy Desert, Murchison and Pilbara biogeographic regions of inland Western Australia.

== Conservation status ==
Goodenia eremophila is classified as "not threatened" by the Government of Western Australia Department of Parks and Wildlife.
