= Zeitschrift für Geomorphologie =

- Discipline: Geomorphology
- Language: English, German, French
- Edited by: K.-H. Pfeffer

Publication details
- Former name(s): Annals of Geomorphology, Annales de Géomorphologie
- Publisher: E. Schweizerbart
- Impact factor: 0.821 (2012)

Standard abbreviations
- ISO 4: Z. Geomorphol.

Indexing
- ISSN: 0372-8854 (print); 1864-1687 (web)

Links
- Journal homepage; Online access

The Zeitschrift für Geomorphologie is a peer-reviewed scientific journal about geomorphology. The journal is indexed in Science Citation Index, GeoRef, Geodok and Scopus. It is published by E. Schweizerbart.
