= Journal of Maps =

Academic journal

- Discipline: Geography
- Language: English
- Edited by: Mike Smith

Publication details
- History: 1970–present
- Publisher: Taylor and Francis
- Frequency: Biannually
- Open access: Yes
- Impact factor: 2.657 (2021)

Standard abbreviations
- ISO 4: J. Maps

Indexing
- ISSN: 2163-5900

Links
- Journal homepage

The Journal of Maps is a biannual open-access peer-reviewed academic journal published by Taylor and Francis. While heavily focused on geography and cartography, the journal publishes maps and other visualizations of spatial information.

== See also ==
- American Association of Geographers
- Geographic Information Systems
- National Council for Geographic Education
