= Gebrüder Borntraeger Verlagsbuchhandlung =

German scientific publishing company

- Parent company: E. Schweizerbart
- Status: active
- Founded: 1790
- Founder: Friedrich Nicolovius
- Country of origin: Germany
- Headquarters location: Stuttgart
- Distribution: worldwide
- Nonfiction topics: Botany, Earth Sciences, Environmental Sciences.
- Fiction genres: scientific
- Official website: www.schweizerbart.de/home/start

Gebrüder Borntraeger Verlagsbuchhandlung (English: Brothers Borntraeger Publishing House) is a scientific publishing company covering the fields of botany, Earth science, and environmental science.

== History ==
The publishing house was established in 1790, in Königsberg by (Matthias) Friedrich Nicolovius (1768-1836). It was taken over in 1818, by the Borntraeger brothers. Their authors included Friedrich Wilhelm Bessel and Immanuel Kant. In 1867, they purchased Verlagsbuchhandlung from Edward Eggers, moved to Berlin and shifted the emphasis to natural sciences. Carl Robert Thost, one of the 34 founding members of the German Palaeontological Society (Paläontologische Gesellschaft), strengthened the publisher's board in 1895.

The publisher is notable before WWII for its monographs, e.g. Köppen and Wegeners seminal work about the Climates of the past (1923), which is still relevant to climate science today.

After World War II, they relocated to Nikolassee. In 1968, the owners of E. Schweizerbart took over the publisher, and moved to Stuttgart where they cooperate with the sister publisher but the publishers, whilst affiliated, remain formally independent.

In 1986, the company acquired the botanical publisher J. Cramer (whose titles include Dissertationes Botanicae and Bibliotheca Phycologica), which continues to operate as an imprint in the Gebr. Borntraeger stable.

== The Geological Guide collection ==
The publisher is noted for the collection of Geological Guides (Sammlung geologischer Führer) whose first 36 volumes were published before World War II from 1897 to 1939. Volume 37 was published as the first post-war volume in 1958 and by 2013 the series had reached volume 138.

== Literature ==
- Gebrüder Borntraeger, Berlin und Leipzig 1790–1930. Berlin: Gebr. Borntraeger. 1930.
- 200 Jahre Gebrüder Borntraeger Verlagsbuchhandlung, Berlin, Stuttgart: ein Jubiläum. Gebr. Borntraeger. 1990.
