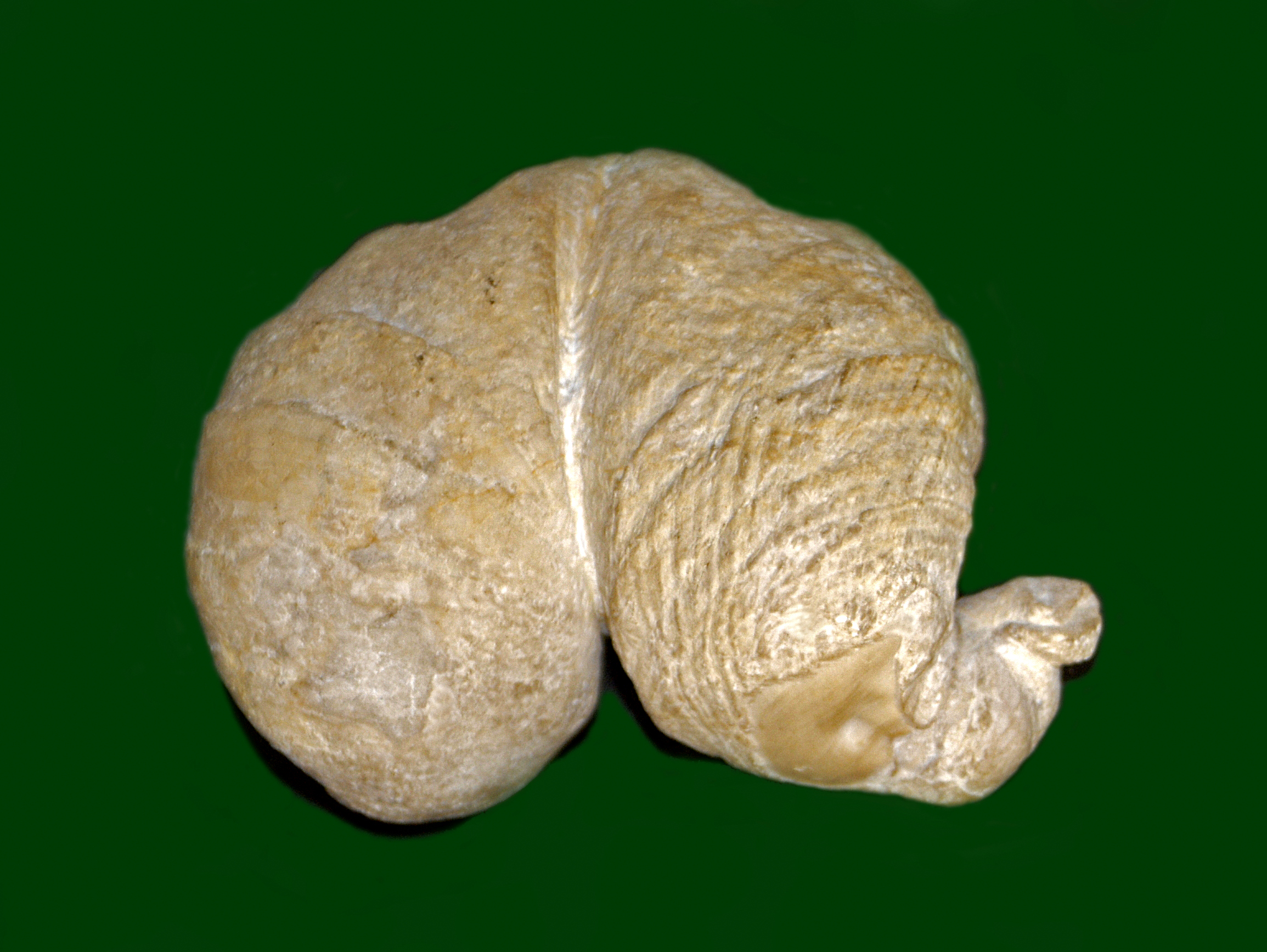
- Fossil Diceras angulatum from Jurassic at Galerie de paléontologie et d'anatomie comparée, Paris

Scientific classification
- Kingdom: Animalia
- Phylum: Mollusca
- Class: Bivalvia
- Order: †Hippuritida
- Suborder: †Hippuritidina
- Superfamily: †Radiolitoidea
- Family: †Diceratidae; Dall 1895

Genera
- See text.

= Diceratidae =

Diceratidae Temporal range: From Jurassic to Cretaceous, 161.2–99.7 Ma

Family of molluscs (fossil)

Diceratidae is a family of rudists, a group of unusual extinct saltwater clams, marine heterodont bivalves in the order Hippuritida.

== Genera ==
Genera within the family Diceratidae:

- †Diceras Lamarck, 1805
