= Candelario =

- Municipality
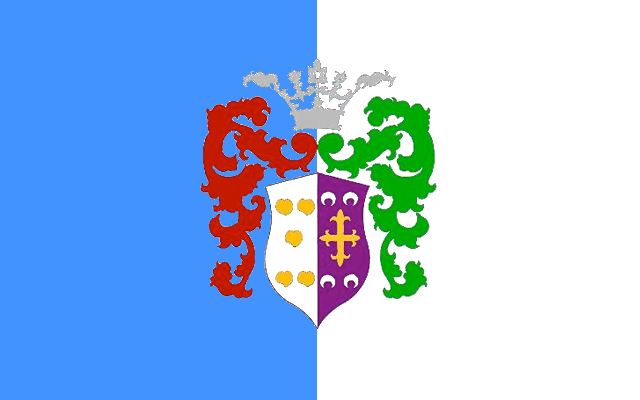
- Flag Coat of arms

- Location in Salamanca

- Location in Spain
- Coordinates: 40°22′5″N 5°44′40″W
- Country: Spain
- Community: Castile and León
- Province: Salamanca
- Comarca: Sierra de Béjar

Government
  - Mayor: Pablo Antonio Hernández (Spanish Socialist Workers' Party)

Area
  - Total: 60.17 km^{2} (23.23 sq mi)
- Elevation: 1,136 m (3,727 ft)

Population (2025-01-01)
  - Total: 832
  - Density: 13.8/km^{2} (35.8/sq mi)
- Time zone: UTC+1 (CET)
  - Summer (DST): UTC+2 (CEST)
- Postal code: 37710
- Website: www.candelario.es

Candelario is a municipality located in the province of Salamanca, Castile and León, Spain.

== Notable people from Candelario ==
- Francisco Sánchez-Bayo (scientist)
- Francisco Núñez Losada (artist)

== See also ==
- Canchal de la Ceja
