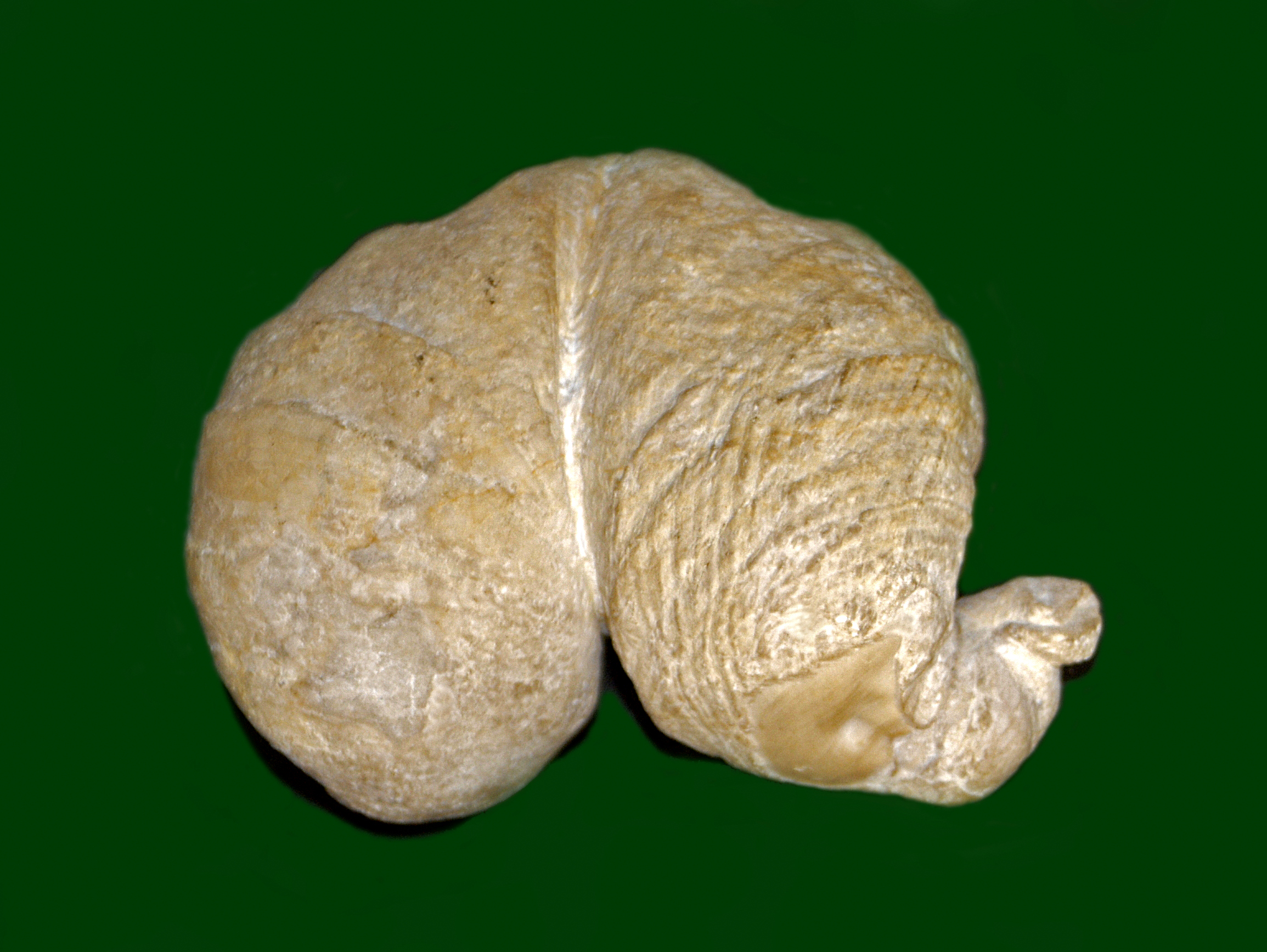
- Fossil Diceras angulatum from Jurassic at Galerie de paléontologie et d'anatomie comparée, Paris

Scientific classification
- Domain: Eukaryota
- Kingdom: Animalia
- Phylum: Mollusca
- Class: Bivalvia
- Order: †Hippuritida
- Suborder: †Hippuritidina
- Superfamily: †Radiolitoidea
- Family: †Diceratidae
- Genus: †Diceras; Lamarck, 1805

Species
- See text.

= Diceras =

Diceras Temporal range: From Jurassic to Cretaceous, 161.2–99.7 Ma

Extinct genus of bivalves

Diceras is an extinct genus of fossil saltwater clams, marine heterodont bivalve molluscs. These bivalves were stationary epifaunal suspension feeders.

== Species ==
Species within the genus Diceras:

- †Diceras brevicornum Karczewski 1969
- †Diceras impressum Karczewski 1969
- †Diceras originale Bayle 1873

== Distribution ==
Fossils of species belonging to this genus have been found in the Cretaceous of France and in the Jurassic of Croatia, Czech Republic, France, Germany, Morocco, Poland, Romania and Slovenia.
