= Neues Jahrbuch für Geologie und Paläontologie =

- Discipline: Geology, paleontology
- Language: English
- Edited by: Günter Schweigert

Publication details
- History: 1807-present
- Publisher: E. Schweizerbart
- Frequency: Monthly
- Impact factor: 0.981 (2019)

Standard abbreviations
- ISO 4: Neues Jahrb. Geol. Paläontol.

Indexing
- CODEN: NJGMA2
- ISSN: 0077-7749
- LCCN: 54034681
- OCLC no.: 1759691

Links
- Journal homepage; Online access (current volume); Online archive (all volumes)

Neues Jahrbuch für Geologie und Paläontologie is a peer-reviewed scientific journal covering research in geology and paleontology. The journal is published monthly, with 4 volumes per year.

== Abstracting and indexing ==
The journal is abstracted and indexed in Science Citation Index Expanded and Current Contents. According to the Journal Citation Reports, the journal has a 2019 impact factor of 0.981.
