= Entomologia Generalis =

- Discipline: Entomology
- Language: English
- Edited by: Nicolas Desneux

Publication details
- Former name: Entomologica Germanica
- History: 1978–present
- Publisher: E. Schweizerbart
- Frequency: 6 issues per year
- Open access: Optional
- Impact factor: 4.330 (2019)

Standard abbreviations
- ISO 4: Entomol. Gen.

Indexing
- ISSN: 0171-8177
- OCLC no.: 1041600331

Links
- Journal homepage

Entomologia Generalis is a peer-reviewed scientific journal covering general and applied entomology. Established in 1978 as Entomologica Germanica by German entomologist Wilhelm August Steffan, the journal publishes original research on insects and arthropods in general. It particularly welcomes contributions examining "sustainable control strategies" of arthropod pests; beneficial arthropods; the impact of invasive pests; and the side effects of pest management.

The editorial team as of 2020 consists of an editor-in-chief, Nicolas Desneux, and a board of 29 associate editors.
