= Acacia obesa =

Conservation status
- Priority Three — Poorly Known Taxa (DEC)

Scientific classification
- Kingdom: Plantae
- Clade: Tracheophytes
- Clade: Angiosperms
- Clade: Eudicots
- Clade: Rosids
- Order: Fabales
- Family: Fabaceae
- Subfamily: Caesalpinioideae
- Clade: Mimosoid clade
- Genus: Acacia
- Species: A. obesa

Binomial name
- Acacia obesa R.S.Cowan & Maslin
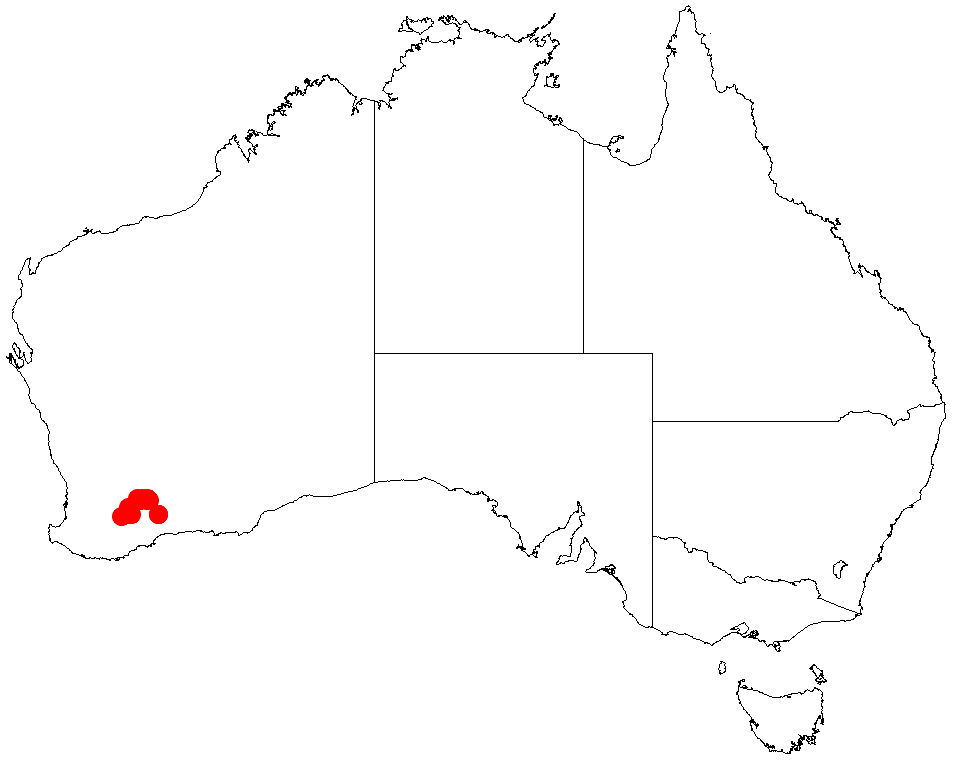
- Occurrence data from AVH

Synonyms
- Racosperma obesum (R.S.Cowan & Maslin) Pedley; Acacia aff. dielsii (B.R.Maslin 550)

Species of legume

Acacia obesa is a species of flowering plant in the family Fabaceae, and is endemic to a small area of south-west of Western Australia. It is a spreading shrub with terete, mostly slightly to strongly curved phyllodes, spherical heads of light golden yellow flowers and linear, strongly curved, leathery pods.

== Description ==
Acacia obesa is a spreading shrub that typically grows to a height of 30–60 cm (12–24 in), and has terete branchlets covered with minute, matted hairs. Its phyllodes are terete, shallowly to strongly curved, 15–25 mm (0.59–0.98 in) long, 1.2–1.75 mm (0.047–0.069 in) in diameter, usually glabrous and strongly striated by 12 to 16 fine, raised veins. The flowers are borne in a sessile, spherical head in axils, 3.5–4.0 mm (0.14–0.16 in) in diameter with 9 to 14 light golden yellow flowers. Flowering occurs from July to September, and the pods are linear, strongly curved, 20–40 mm (0.79–1.57 in) long, 2.0–2.5 mm (0.079–0.098 in) wide and leathery. The seeds are round or four-sided in cross section, 1.5–1.8 mm (0.059–0.071 in) long, glossy mottled tan, with an aril nearly as long as the seed.

== Taxonomy ==
Acacia obesa was first formally in 1995 by Richard Sumner Cowan and Bruce Maslin in the journal Nuytsia from specimens collected by Maslin 33.6 km (20.9 mi) east of Hyden in 1970. The specific epithet (obesa) means 'plump' or 'fat', and refers to the "corpulent phyllodes of this species".

== Distribution and habitat ==
This species of wattle grows in sand and gravelly loam in low, open woodland, open scrub and heath in a restericted are near Lake Grace, Hyden and Lake King in the Mallee bioregion of south-western Western Australia.

== Conservation status ==
Acacia obesa is listed as "Priority Three" by the Government of Western Australia Department of Biodiversity, Conservation and Attractions, meaning that it is poorly known and known from only a few locations but is not under imminent threat.

== See also ==
- List of Acacia species
