= Journal of Photogrammetry, Remote Sensing and Geoinformation Science =

- Discipline: Photogrammetry, Remote sensing, Geoinformation science
- Language: English
- Edited by: Markus Gerke

Publication details
- Former name(s): Photogrammetrie, Fernerkundung, Geoinformation
- Publisher: Springer Science+Business Media
- Impact factor: 1.857 (2020)

Standard abbreviations
- ISO 4: J. Photogramm. Remote Sens. Geoinf. Sci.

Indexing
- ISSN: 2512-2789 (print); 2512-2819 (web)

Links
- Journal homepage

The Journal of Photogrammetry, Remote Sensing and Geoinformation Science (formerly Photogrammetrie, Fernerkundung, Geoinformation - PFG) is an academic journal published by Springer on behalf of the German Society for Photogrammetry, Remote Sensing and Geoinformation about photogrammetry, remote sensing, and geoinformation science. Its editor-in-chief is Markus Gerke. According to the Journal Citation Reports, the journal has a 2020 impact factor of 1.857.
