= Acacia nivea =

Scientific classification
- Kingdom: Plantae
- Clade: Tracheophytes
- Clade: Angiosperms
- Clade: Eudicots
- Clade: Rosids
- Order: Fabales
- Family: Fabaceae
- Subfamily: Caesalpinioideae
- Clade: Mimosoid clade
- Genus: Acacia
- Species: A. nivea

Binomial name
- Acacia nivea R.S.Cowan & Maslin
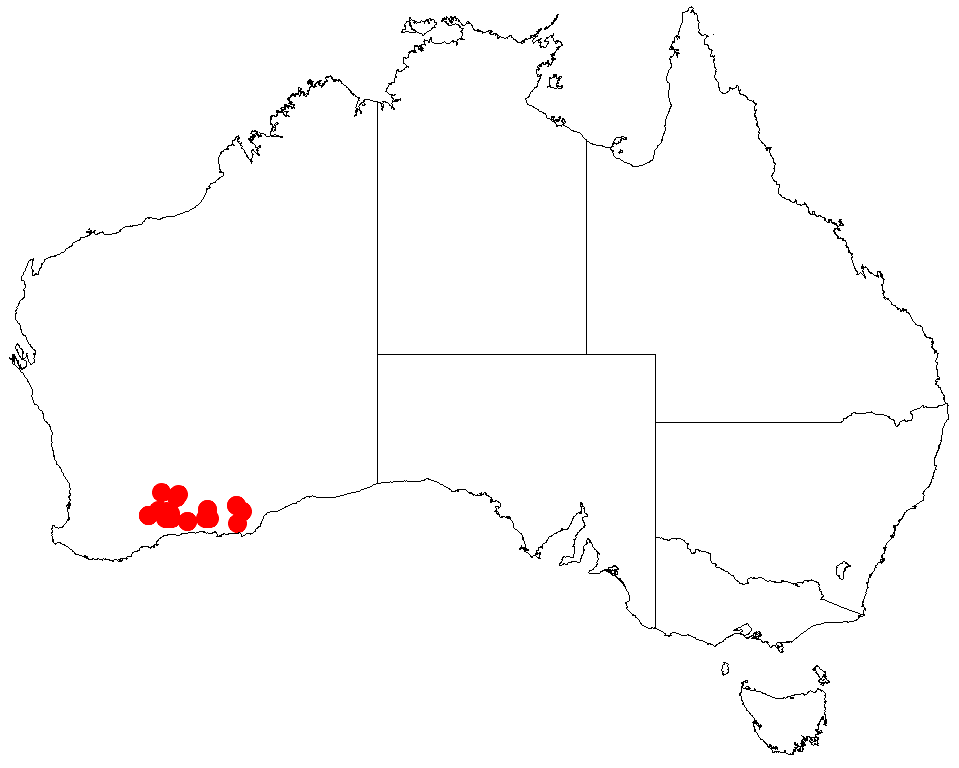
- Occurrence data from AVH

Synonyms
- Racosperma niveum (R.S.Cowan & Maslin) Pedley

Species of legume

Acacia nivea is a species of flowering plant in the family Fabaceae, and is endemic to the south-west of Western Australia. It is a low-spreading to domed shrub with terete, hairy branchlets, inclined to erect, terete phyllodes, spherical heads of golden yellow flowers and linear, wavy, papery or thinly leathery pods strongly raised over the seeds.

== Description ==
Acacia nivea is a low-spreading to domed shrub that typically grows to a height of 0.4–1 m (1 ft 4 in – 3 ft 3 in) and has a terete, densely hairy branchlets that soon become embedded in a hard, normally white resin. Its phyllodes are inclined to erect, straight to slightly arched, terete, 10–20 mm (0.39–0.79 in) long, 0.8–1.2 mm (0.031–0.047 in) wide, more or less abruptly narrowed to the pulvinus, glabrous and more or less resinous with 12 to 16 normally slightly raised veins. The flowers are borne in two spherical heads in axils on glabrous peduncles 2–4.5 mm (0.079–0.177 in) long. Flowering occurs in August and September, and the immature pods are linear, wavy, slightly curved, 30–35 mm (1.2–1.4 in) long, 3 mm (0.12 in) wide and papery or thinly leathery, and strongly raised over the seeds.

== Taxonomy ==
Acacia nivea was first formally described in 1995 by Richard Cowan and Bruce Maslin in the journal Nuytsia from specimens collected by Peter G. Wilson about 23 km (14 mi) east of Mount Madden. The specific epithet (nivea) means 'snow-white', referring to the branchlets.

== Distribution and habitat ==
This species of wattle grows in sand, sandy-loam or clay in low, open woodland, or shrubland or in a discontinuous distribution near Lake King, south-east to 40 km (25 mi) north-north-west of Munglinup, east to near Grass Patch, near Clyde Hill (about 70 km (43 mi) north of Esperance) and in the Mount Andrew–Ponier Rock area (south-west of Balladonia) in the Coolgardie and Mallee bioregions of Western Australia.

== See also ==
- List of Acacia species
