= E. Schweizerbart =

Schweizerbart Science Publishers (E. Schweizerbart'sche Verlagsbuchhandlung)
- Status: Active
- Founded: 1826
- Founder: Emanuel Schweizerbart
- Country of origin: Germany
- Headquarters location: Stuttgart
- Distribution: Worldwide
- Nonfiction topics: Botany, earth sciences, environmental sciences, life sciences
- Owner(s): privately owned
- Official website: www.schweizerbart.com

E. Schweizerbart'sche Verlagsbuchhandlung (Schweizerbart Science Publishers) is a Stuttgart-based scholarly publisher established in 1826 by Wilhelm Emanuel Schweizerbart. The company and its affiliate Borntraeger Science publish English-language scholarly journals, monographs and books series in the earth and environmental sciences (e.g. geology, palaeontology, mineralogy, stratigraphy), the life sciences (botany, zoology, entomology, aquatic ecology, soil science), and physical (medical) anthropology.

In its early years, the publishing house gained acclaim in Germany for publishing groundbreaking geological and palaeontological works, among them the (first) German-language edition of Darwin's "The Origin of Species".

The company is privately owned by two scientists and is not part of a larger entity. It currently publishes several journal on behalf of the Federal Institute for Geosciences and Natural Resources, State Authority for Mining, Energy and Geology of Lower Saxony State, and the Senckenberg Nature Research Society. In 2016, E. Schweizerbart acquired all publications of Catena Verlag, a publishing house specializing in soil science.

== See also ==
- List of E. Schweizerbart serials
