= Diels =

Diels is the last name of several people:

- Rudolf Diels (1900–1957), German politician
- Otto Diels (1876–1954), German scientist noted for his work on the Diels–Alder reaction
- Ludwig Diels (1874–1945), German botanist whose standard author abbreviation is Diels
- Hermann Diels (1848–1922), German classical scholar
