= List of E. Schweizerbart serials =

This is a list of academic journals, monographic series, and other serials published by E. Schweizerbart.

== A ==
- Abhandlungen der Preußischen Geologischen Landesanstalt
- Abhandlungen der Senckenberg Gesellschaft für Naturforschung
- Advances in Bryology
- Advances in Geoecology
- Advances in Limnology
- Afrika-Kartenwerk
- Akademie für Geowissenschaften und Geotechnologien, Veröffentlichungen
- Algological Studies
- Altlastenforum Baden-Württemberg e.V., Schriftenreihe
- Animal Cytogenetics
- Annales Universitatis Saraviensis
- Anthropologischer Anzeiger
- Arbeiten aus dem Limnologischen Institut der Universität Konstanz (Walter Schlienz Institut)
- Arbeitshefte Geologie Baugrund Rohstoffe
- Archiv für Hydrobiologie
- Archiv für Hydrobiologie Supplementbände
- Archiv für Lagerstättenforschung der Preußischen Geologischen Landesanstalt
- Archiv für Molluskenkunde
- Atlas Ost- und Südosteuropa

== B ==
- Basic and Applied Dryland Research
- Beihefte zum Geologischen Jahrbuch
- Beiträge zur Regionalen Geologie der Erde
- Berichte der Deutschen Mineralogischen Gesellschaft
- Berliner Beiträge zur Ökologie
- Bibliographia Phytosociologica Syntaxonomica
- Bibliotheca Botanica
- Bibliotheca Diatomologica
- Bibliotheca Lichenologica
- Bibliotheca Mycologica
- Bibliotheca Phycologica
- Bodenschutzrecht-Praxis
- Botanische Jahrbücher für Systematik, Pflanzengeschichte und Pflanzengeographie
- Bryophytorum Bibliotheca

== C ==
- Catena Paperback
- Catena Supplements
- Colloques Phytosociologiques
- Contributions to Sedimentary Geology
- Courier Forschungsinstitut Senckenberg
- Cytotaxonomical Atlases

== D ==
- Deutsches Handwörterbuch der Tektonik
- Diatom Research
- Die Binnengewässer
- Dissertationes Botanicae

== E ==
- Ecovision World Monograph Series
- Einführung in die Paläobiologie
- Eisenack Catalog of Fossil Dinoflagellates
- Encyclopedia of Plant Anatomy
- Entomologia Generalis
- European Journal of Mineralogy

== F ==
- Flora Mycologica Iberica
- Flora et Vegetatio Mundi
- Fundamental and Applied Limnology
- Fungorum Rariorum Icones Coloratae

== G ==
- GBL Gemeinschaftsvorhaben
- GeoEcology Essay
- GeoEcology Paperback
- GeoEcology Textbook
- Geocolleg
- Geoexploration Monographs
- Geologisches Jahrbuch
  - Geologisches Jahrbuch Reihe A
  - Geologisches Jahrbuch Reihe B
  - Geologisches Jahrbuch Reihe C
  - Geologisches Jahrbuch Reihe D
  - Geologisches Jahrbuch Reihe E
  - Geologisches Jahrbuch Reihe F
  - Geologisches Jahrbuch Reihe G
  - Geologisches Jahrbuch Reihe H
- Geotectonic Research
- Global Tectonics and Metallogeny
- Griffiths Flies of Nearctic Region

== H ==
- Homo
- Handbuch der Binnenfischerei Mitteleuropas
- Handbuch der Geophysik
- Handbuch der Seefischerei Nordeuropas
- Herzogia
- Hirt's Stichwortbücher

== I ==
- IAC Symposia
- Index Hepaticarum

== J ==
- Jahresberichte und Mitteilungen des Oberrheinischen Geologischen Vereins
- Journal of Geomorphology

== K ==
- KTB Report
- Katalog der fossilen Dinoflagellaten, Hystrichosphären und verwandten Mikrofossilien
- Kleine Senckenberg
- Konzepte für die nachhaltige Entwicklung einer Flusslandschaft
- Krystalinikum

== L ==
- Large Rivers
- Leaf Venation Patterns
- Lehrbuch der Hydrogeologie
- Lehrbuch der Hydrologie
- Lethea Geognostica
- Limnologie Aktuell
- Lindner, Erwin: Die Fliegen der Paläarktischen Region

== M ==
- Materialkundlich-Technische Reihe
- Meteor
- Meteorologische Zeitschrift
- Mitteilungen der IVL
- Mitteilungen der Deutschen Malakozoologischen Gesellschaft
- Monograph Series on Mineral Deposits
- Monographic Studies
- Monographien von BGR und LBEG
- Mycologia Memoir

== N ==
- Nachhaltiges Niedersachsen
- Neues Jahrbuch für Geologie und Paläontologie
  - Neues Jahrbuch für Geologie und Paläontologie - Abhandlungen
  - Neues Jahrbuch für Geologie und Paläontologie - Monatshefte
- Neues Jahrbuch für Mineralogie
  - Neues Jahrbuch für Mineralogie - Abhandlungen
  - Neues Jahrbuch für Mineralogie - Monatshefte
- Newsletters on Stratigraphy
- Nova Hedwigia

== P ==
- PFG - Photogrammetrie, Fernerkundung, Geoinformation
- Palaeontographica
  - Palaeontographica Abteilung A
  - Palaeontographica Abteilung B
  - Palaeontographica Supplementbände
- Papers on Cyanobacterial Research
- Perspectives in Phycology
- Phanerogamarum Monographiae
- Phytocoenologia
- Plant Diversity and Evolution
- Plinius
- Proceedings of the Quadrennial IAGOD Symposia

== Q ==
- Querschnitte

== R ==
- Reise in Ostafrika
- Relief Boden Palaeoklima
- Reports of the Princeton University Expedition to Patagonia
- River Systems
- Rohstoffwirtschaftliche Länderberichte
- Rohstoffwirtschaftliche Länderstudien

== S ==
- Sammlung Geographischer Führer
- Sammlung Geologischer Führer
- Schriften der Gesellschaft für Verantwortung in der Wissenschaft
- Schriftenreihe der Deutschen Gesellschaft für Geowissenschaften
- Senckenberg Monographs
- Senckenberg-Poster
- Senckenbergiana Biologica
- Senckenbergiana Lethaea
- Senckenbergiana Maritima
- Studienbücher der Geographie
- Studienhefte zur Physik des Erdkörpers
- Studienhefte zur angewandten Geophysik
- Studies on Tropical Andean Ecosystems

== T ==
- Tropische Binnengewässer

== U ==
- Untersuchungen des Elbe-Aestuars
- Untersuchungen über Angebote und Nachfrage Mineralischer Rohstoffe
- Urbanization of the Earth

== V ==
- Verhandlungen IVL

== W ==
- Winters Naturwissenschaftliche Taschenbücher

== Z ==
- Zeitschrift der Deutschen Gesellschaft für Geowissenschaften
- Zeitschrift für Angewandte Geologie
- Zeitschrift für Geomorphologie
  - Zeitschrift für Geomorphologie, Supplement Volumes
  - Zeitschrift für Geomorphologie, Supplementary Issues
- Zentralblatt für Geologie und Paläontologie
  - Zentralblatt für Geologie und Paläontologie, Teil I
  - Zentralblatt für Geologie und Paläontologie, Teil II
- Ziegler Catalogue of Conodonts
- Zoologica
