= Ernst Georg Pritzel =

German botanist

- Born: 15 May 1875
- Died: 6 April 1946 (aged 70); Berlin, Germany
- Scientific career
- Fields: Botany phytogeography taxonomy

Ernst Georg Pritzel (15 May 1875 – 6 April 1946) was a German botanist.

He is known for his research in the fields of phytogeography and taxonomy. He contributed works on Lycopodiaceae, Psilotaceae and Pittosporaceae to Engler & Prantl’s "Die Natürlichen Pflanzenfamilien".

In 1900–02, with Ludwig Diels, he collected plants in South Africa, Australia and New Zealand. They published the results of their expedition (a collection of 5700 species) in the Botanische Jahrbücher in 1904–05. Their findings included 235 new species. Pritzel issued and distributed the exsiccata-like specimen series Plantae Australiae occidentalis 1901–1902 editae.

The fungi genus Pritzeliella was named after him by Paul Christoph Hennings in 1903 and Melaleuca pritzelii (originally Melaleuca densa var. pritzelii) by Karel Domin in 1923.

== Publications ==
- Südwest-Australien (with Ludwig Diels) 1933 - Southwest Australia
- Lycopodiaceae (with H. Potonie)
- Fragmenta phytographiae Australiae occidentalis. Beiträge zur Kenntnis der Pflanzen Westaustraliens, ihrer Verbreitung und ihrer Lebens-Verhältnisse (with Ludwig Diels) 1905 - Contributions to the knowledge of Western Australian plants, their distribution and environment.
