= Dodonaea divaricata =

Scientific classification
- Kingdom: Plantae
- Clade: Tracheophytes
- Clade: Angiosperms
- Clade: Eudicots
- Clade: Rosids
- Order: Sapindales
- Family: Sapindaceae
- Genus: Dodonaea
- Species: D. divaricata

Binomial name
- Dodonaea divaricata Benth.

Synonyms
- Dodonaea ericoides auct. non Miq., Bulletin de la Societe Imperiale des Naturalistes de Moscou

Species of shrub

Dodonaea divaricata is a species of plant in the family Sapindaceae and is endemic to the south-west of Western Australia. It is a spreading shrub with simple, linear to narrowly elliptic leaves, flowers arranged singly with six stamens, and three-angled capsules with horn-like appendages.

== Description ==
Dodonaea divaricata is a dioecious, spreading shrub that typically grows to a height of up to 0.2–1 m (7.9 in – 3 ft 3.4 in). Its leaves are simple, sessile, 30–80 mm (1.2–3.1 in) long and 10–30 mm (0.39–1.18 in) wide, sometimes with up to four irregular teeth on the edges. The flowers are borne singly, the flowers more or less sessile or on a pedicel 0.5 mm (0.020 in) long. There are usually three linear sepals, 1.5–2 mm (0.059–0.079 in) long, but that fall off as the flowers open. Each flower has six stamens and the ovary is glabrous or with soft hairs. The fruit is a three-angled, spherical capsule 3–5.5 mm (0.12–0.22 in) long and 4–6 mm (0.16–0.24 in) wide, with horn-like appendages.

== Taxonomy and naming ==
Dodonaea divaricata was first formally described in 1863 by George Bentham in his Flora Australiensis from specimens collected by James Drummond. The specific epithet (divaricata) means 'spreading at a wide angle'.

== Distribution and habitat ==
This species of Dodonaea grows in open mallee scrub, mallee heath and low wandoo woodland from near Morawa to Narembeen, in the Avon Wheatbelt, Coolgardie, Geraldton Sandplains, Jarrah Forest and Mallee bioregions of south-western Western Australia.

== Conservation status ==
Dodonaea divaricata is listed as "not threatened" by the Government of Western Australia Department of Biodiversity, Conservation and Attractions.
