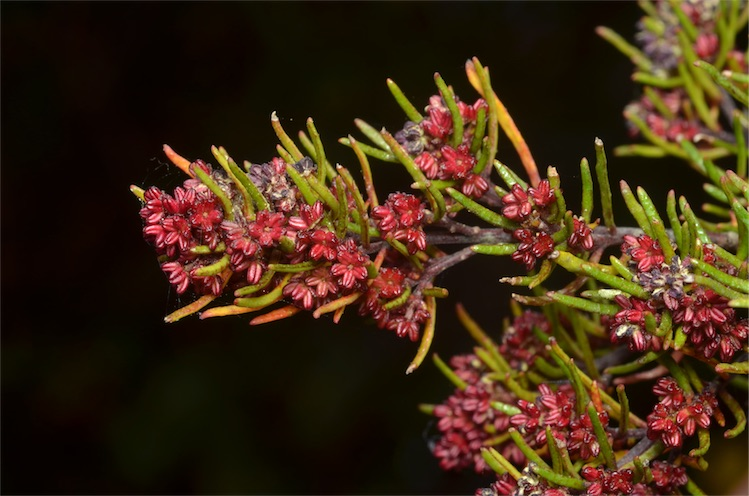
- In the Tasmanian Bushland Garden

Scientific classification
- Kingdom: Plantae
- Clade: Tracheophytes
- Clade: Angiosperms
- Clade: Eudicots
- Clade: Rosids
- Order: Sapindales
- Family: Sapindaceae
- Genus: Dodonaea
- Species: D. filiformis

Binomial name
- Dodonaea filiformis Link

= Dodonaea filiformis =

Species of flowering plant

Dodonaea filifolia is a species of flowering plant in the family Sapindaceae and is endemic to Tasmania. It is an erect shrub with sessile, simple, linear leaves, flowers arranged in cymes on the ends of branches each flower usually with five stamens, and 3-winged capsules.

== Description ==
Dodonaea filifolia is a dioecious, erect shrub that typically grows to a height of up to 2 m (6 ft 7 in). Its leaves are simple, sessile, linear, 12–22 mm (0.47–0.87 in) long, 0.5–1 mm (0.020–0.039 in) wide and glabrous, the upper surface channelled. The flowers are borne in three- or four-flowered cymes on the ends of branches, each flower on a pedicel 1–3 mm (0.039–0.118 in) long, usually with five stamens. The four or five sepals are oblong to linear, 0.6–1.5 mm (0.024–0.059 in) long but fall off as the flowers develop and the ovary is usually glabrous. The fruit is a four-winged capsule 9.5–12.5 mm (0.37–0.49 in) long and 11.5–13 mm (0.45–0.51 in) wide, the wings membranous or sometimes leathery, 2.5–4 mm (0.098–0.157 in) wide.

== Taxonomy and naming ==
Dodonaea filifolia was first formally described in 1821 by Johann Heinrich Friedrich Link in his Enumeratio Plantarum Horti Botanici Regii Berolinensis Altera. The specific epithet (filifolia) means 'thread-leaved'.

== Distribution and habitat ==
This species of Dodonaea grows in dry forests and dense Leptospermum scrub in gravelly or rocky soils, mostly in the eastern half of Tasmania.
