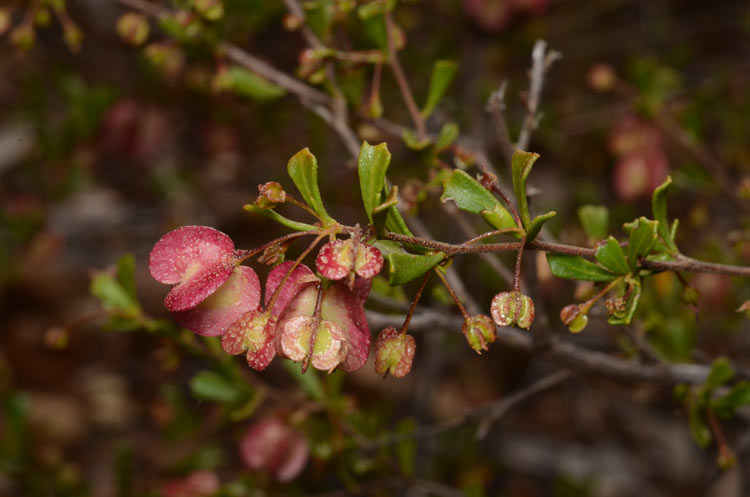
- Near the crossing of the Nogoa River on the Dawson Developmental Road.

Scientific classification
- Kingdom: Plantae
- Clade: Tracheophytes
- Clade: Angiosperms
- Clade: Eudicots
- Clade: Rosids
- Order: Sapindales
- Family: Sapindaceae
- Genus: Dodonaea
- Species: D. peduncularis

Binomial name
- Dodonaea peduncularis Lindl.

Synonyms
- Dodonaea peduncularis Lindl. var. peduncularis; Dodonaea penducularis K.A.W.Williams orth. var.; Dodonaea pubescens Lindl.

= Dodonaea peduncularis =

Species of shrub

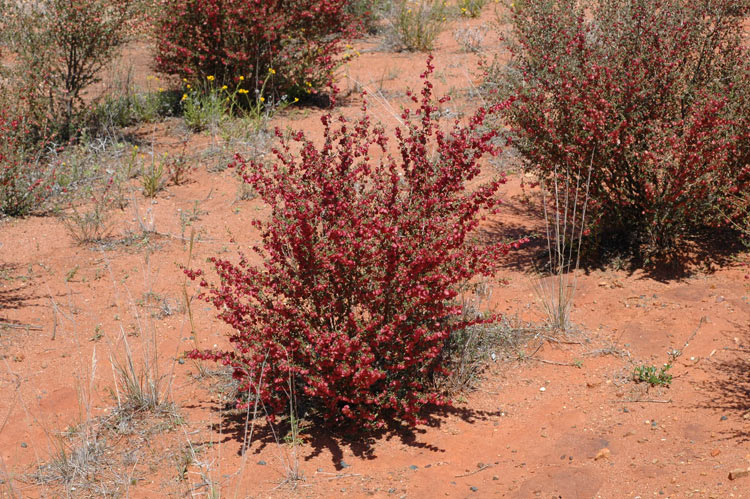
Habit near Mount Hope

Dodonaea peduncularis is a species of plant in the family Sapindaceae and is endemic to eastern Australia. It is a spreading dioecious shrub with simple, sessile egg-shaped to lance-shaped leaves with the narrower end towards the base, flowers arranged singly or in cymes, the flowers usually with four sepals and eight stamens, and capsules with four wings.

== Description ==
Dodonaea peduncularis is a spreading dioecious shrub that typically grows to a height of up to 2 m (6 ft 7 in). Its leaves are simple, sessile, egg-shaped to lance-shaped with the narrower end towards the base, 5–18 mm (0.20–0.71 in) long, 2–5 mm (0.079–0.197 in) long and concave on the upper surface, with three or four teeth on the end. The flowers are arranged singly or in few-flowered cymes on pedicels usually 2.5–7.5 mm (0.098–0.295 in) long, with four lance-shaped to egg-shaped sepals, 1.3–2.4 mm (0.051–0.094 in) long, and usually eight stamens. The ovary is glabrous. The fruit is a four-winged, broadly oblong capsule 7–12.5 mm (0.28–0.49 in) long and 8–12.5 mm (0.31–0.49 in) wide and glabrous with membranous wings 2–3.5 mm (0.079–0.138 in) wide.

== Taxonomy ==
Dodonaea peduncularis was first formally described in 1848 by John Lindley in Thomas Mitchell's Journal of an Expedition into the Interior of Tropical Australia. The specific epithet (peduncularis) means 'pedunculate'.

== Distribution and habitat ==
This species of Dodonaea grows in semi-arid, undulating or flat country in open woodland and hummock grassland in sandy soil, from Charters Towers and southern Queensland and the western slopes and tablelands of New South Wales.

== Conservation status ==
Dodonaea peduncularis is listed as of "least concern" under the Queensland Government Nature Conservation Act 1992.
