= Dodonaea caespitosa =

Scientific classification
- Kingdom: Plantae
- Clade: Tracheophytes
- Clade: Angiosperms
- Clade: Eudicots
- Clade: Rosids
- Order: Sapindales
- Family: Sapindaceae
- Genus: Dodonaea
- Species: D. caespitosa

Binomial name
- Dodonaea caespitosa Diels

Species of shrub

Dodonaea caespitosa is a species of plant in the family Sapindaceae and is endemic to the south-west of Western Australia. It is a spreading, compact shrub with simple, sessile, linear leaves, sessile flowers arranged singly with six stamens, and four-angled capsules.

== Description ==
Dodonaea caespitosa is dioecious, spreading, compact shrub that typically grows to a height of up to 50 cm (20 in). The leaves are sessile, simple, linear, glabrous, 2–10 mm (0.079–0.394 in) long, about 1 mm (0.039 in) wide with the end curved downwards and the edges rolled under. There are up to four irregular teeth on the outer part of the leaves. The flowers more or less sessile, borne singly in leaf axils, with three egg-shaped sepals 1.5–2.3 mm (0.059–0.091 in) long, but that fall off as the flowers open. There are usually six stamens and the ovary is glabrous. The fruit is a three-angled, spherical capsule 4.5–6 mm (0.18–0.24 in) long and 5–9 mm (0.20–0.35 in) wide, with horn-like appendages 1–3 mm (0.039–0.118 in) wide near the tip of the capsule.

== Taxonomy and naming ==
Dodonaea caespitosa was first formally described in 1904 by Ludwig Diels in the journal Botanische Jahrbücher fur Systematik. The specific epithet (caespitosa) means 'tufted'.

== Distribution and habitat ==
This species of Dodonaea grows in sand, loam and stony clay on granite outcrops, slopes and sandplains, in the Avon Wheatbelt, Coolgardie, Esperance Plains, Geraldton Sandplains, Jarrah Forest and Mallee bioregions of south-western Western Australia.
