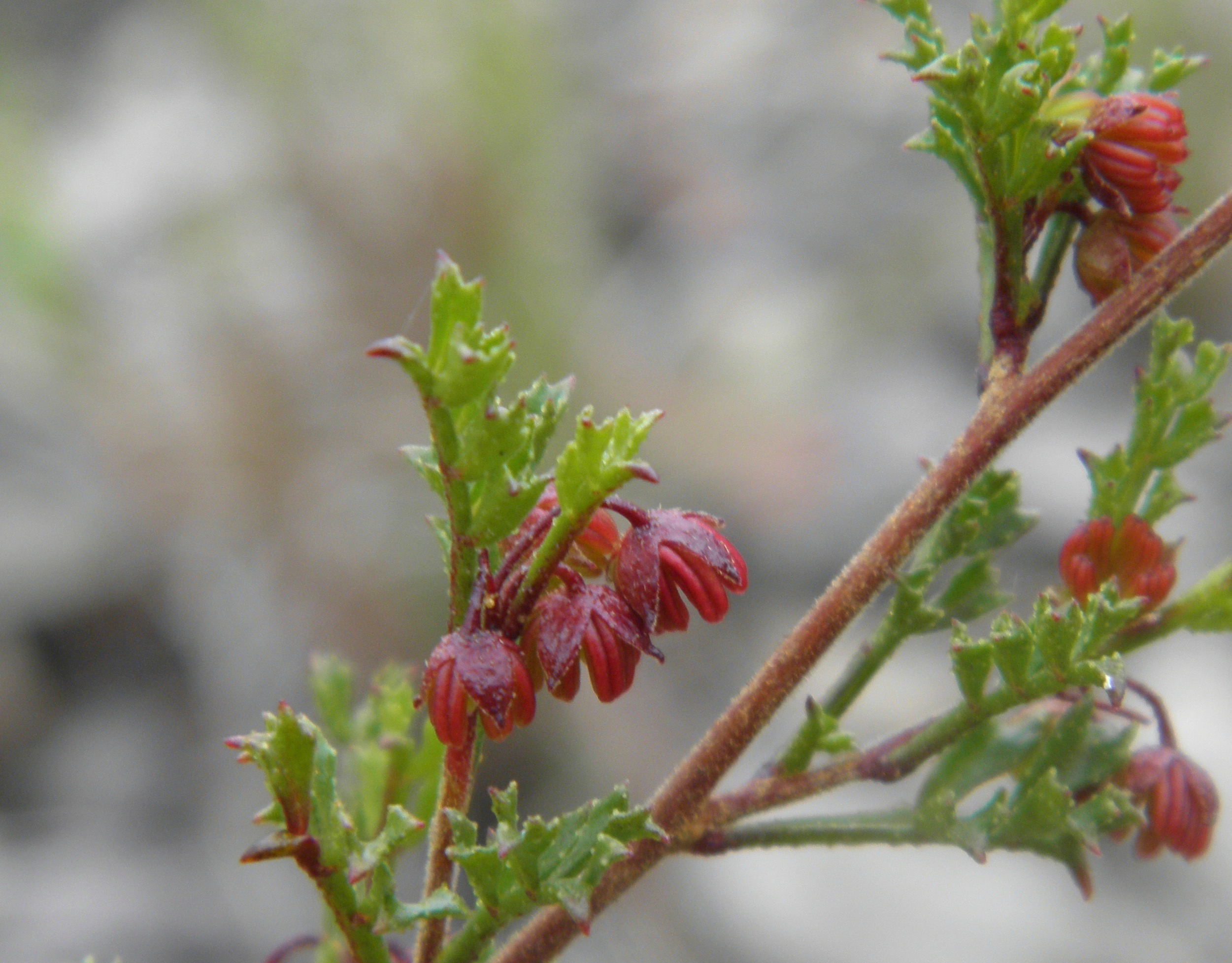

Scientific classification
- Kingdom: Plantae
- Clade: Tracheophytes
- Clade: Angiosperms
- Clade: Eudicots
- Clade: Rosids
- Order: Sapindales
- Family: Sapindaceae
- Genus: Dodonaea
- Species: D. uncinata

Binomial name
- Dodonaea uncinata J.G.West

= Dodonaea uncinata =

Species of shrub

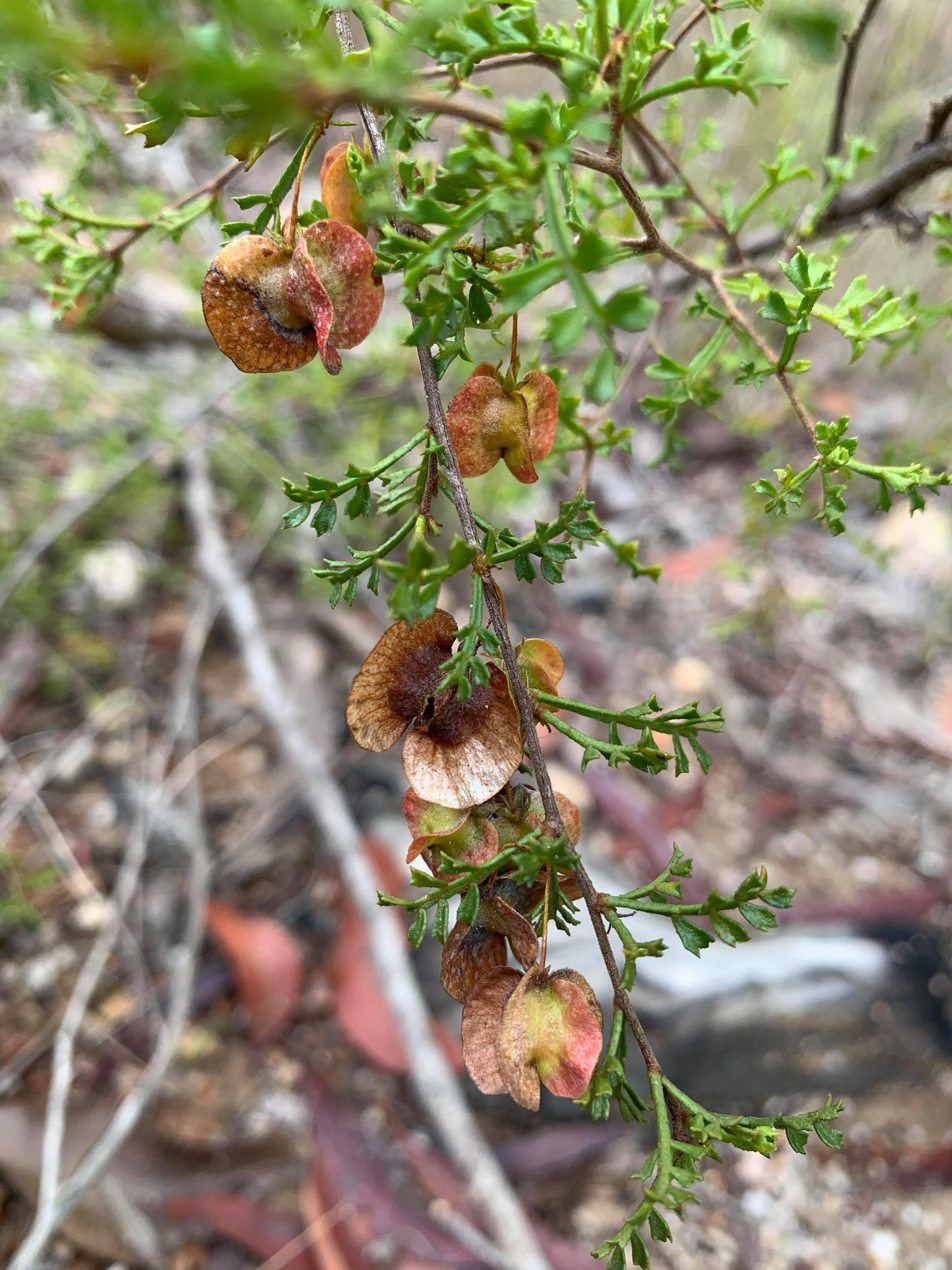
Capsules

Dodonaea uncinata is a species of flowering plant in the family Sapindaceae and is endemic to Queensland, Australia. It is a dioecious, spreading shrub with imparipinnate leaves, usually with 6 to 8, 3-toothed leaflets, flowers arranged singly, in pairs or groups of three, each flower with four sepals, eight stamens, and a four-winged capsule.

== Description ==
Dodonaea uncinata is a dioecious, spreading shrub that typically grows to a height of up to 1 m (3 ft 3 in). It has imparipinnate leaves 4–10 mm (0.16–0.39 in) long on a petiole 3–5.5 mm (0.12–0.22 in) long with 6 to 8 leaflets. The leaflets have three teeth on the end and a wedge-shaped base, 2.6–5 mm (0.10–0.20 in) long and 1.5–3 mm (0.059–0.118 in) wide, the end leaflet shorter and strongly curved downwards, or hooked. The flowers are arranged singly, in pairs or groups of three, each flower on a pedicel 3–6.5 mm (0.12–0.26 in) long. There are 4 lance-shaped to egg-shaped sepals 1.6–3 mm (0.063–0.118 in) long, 8 stamens, and the ovary is glabrous. Flowering occurs from May to June, and the capsule is egg-shaped or elliptic, 11–16 mm (0.43–0.63 in) long and 8.5–14 mm (0.33–0.55 in) wide with 4 membranous wings, 3–4.5 mm (0.12–0.18 in).

== Taxonomy ==
Dodonaea uncinata was first formally described in 1984 by Judith Gay West in the journal Brunonia from specimens collected in the Mount Spec area, 17.6 km (10.9 mi) from Paluma in 1974. The specific epithet (uncinata) means 'hooked'.

== Distribution and habitat ==
This species of hop-bush grows in open forest or woodland, usually in sandstone soils, in scattered locations between the Mount Windsor National Park and Mount Spec, north-west of Townsville in Queensland.

== Conservation status ==
Dodonaea uncinata is listed as "near threatened" under the Queensland Government Nature Conservation Act 1992.
