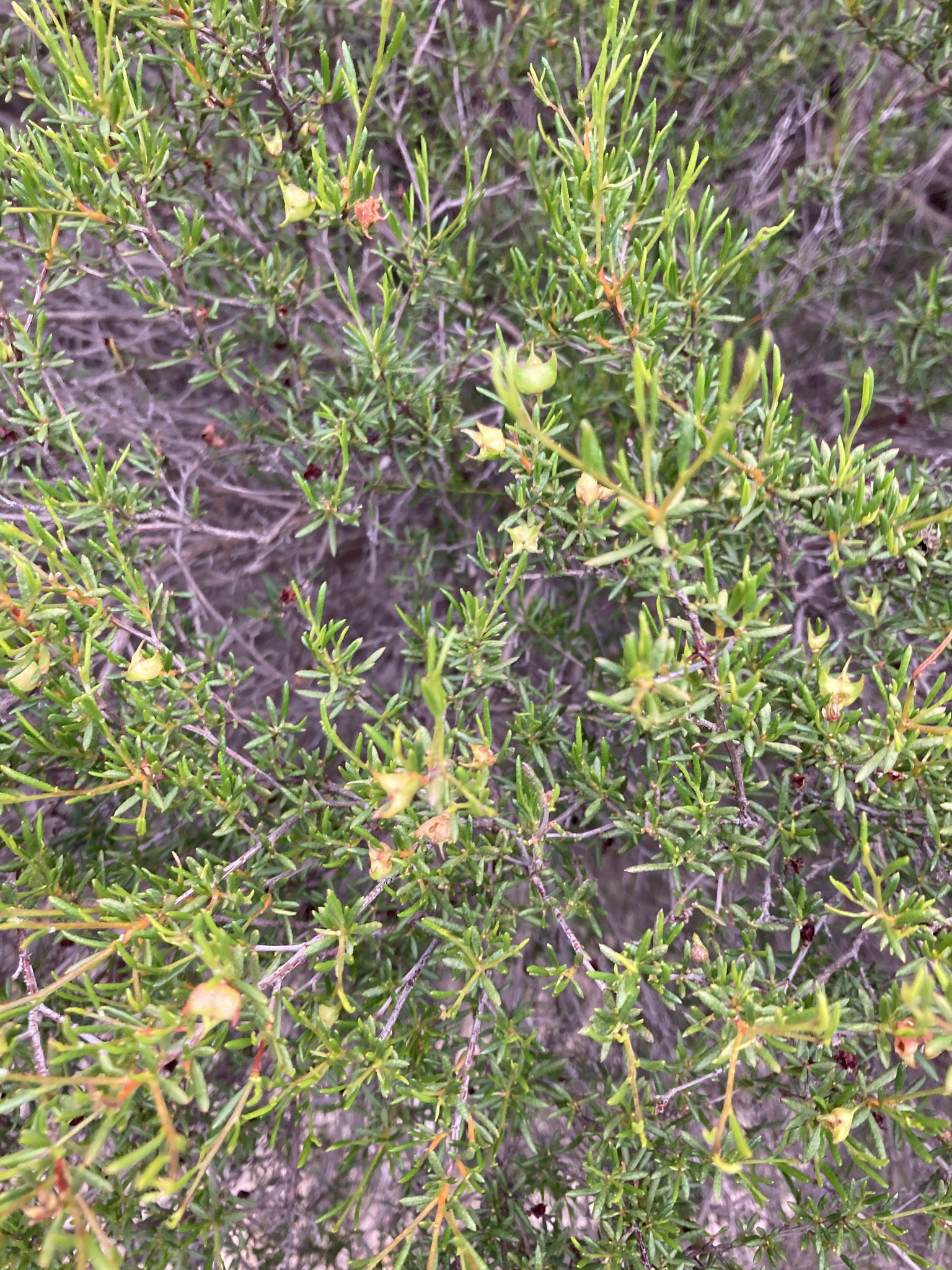
- Near the Z Bend

Scientific classification
- Kingdom: Plantae
- Clade: Embryophytes
- Clade: Tracheophytes
- Clade: Spermatophytes
- Clade: Angiosperms
- Clade: Eudicots
- Clade: Rosids
- Order: Sapindales
- Family: Sapindaceae
- Genus: Dodonaea
- Species: D. pinifolia

Binomial name
- Dodonaea pinifolia Miq.

= Dodonaea pinifolia =

Species of plant

Dodonaea pinifolia is a species of plant in the family Sapindaceae and is endemic to the south-west of Western Australia. It is a spreading, usually dioecious shrub with simple, sessile, usually linear leaves, flowers singly or in groups of two or three, the flowers usually with four sepals and eight stamens, and capsules with horn-like or lobe-like appendages.

== Description ==
Dodonaea pinifolia is a spreading, usually dioecious shrub that typically grows to a height of up to 1 m (3 ft 3 in). Its leaves are simple, sessile usually linear, 8–35 mm (0.31–1.38 in) long, 10–30 mm (0.39–1.18 in) wide and usually glabrous. The flowers are arranged singly or in groups of two or three, each flower on a pedicel 1–4 mm (0.039–0.157 in) long, with four egg-shaped or lance-shaped sepals, 2–3.5 mm (0.079–0.138 in) long but that fall off as the flowers develop, and eight stamens. The ovary is hairy and the fruit is usually a four-angled capsule, 4.5–11.5 mm (0.18–0.45 in) long and 5–11.5 mm (0.20–0.45 in) wide including horn-like or lobe-like appendages 0.5–8 mm (0.020–0.315 in) wide at the tip of the capsule.

== Taxonomy ==
Dodonaea pinifolia was first formally described in 1845 by Friedrich Miquel in Lehmann's Plantae Preissianae. The specific epithet (pinifolia) means 'pine-leaved'.

== Distribution and habitat ==
This species of Dodonaea grows on hills and on granite and sandstone outcrops in the Avon Wheatbelt, Coolgardie, Esperance Plains, Geraldton Sandplains, Jarrah Forest, Mallee, Murchison, Swan Coastal Plain bioregions of south-western Western Australia.

== Conservation status ==
Dodonaea pinifolia is listed as "not threatened" by the Government of Western Australia Department of Biodiversity, Conservation and Attractions.
