= Dodonaea concinna =

Scientific classification
- Kingdom: Plantae
- Clade: Tracheophytes
- Clade: Angiosperms
- Clade: Eudicots
- Clade: Rosids
- Order: Sapindales
- Family: Sapindaceae
- Genus: Dodonaea
- Species: D. concinna

Binomial name
- Dodonaea concinna Benth.

Synonyms
- Dodonaea adenophora auct. non Miq., Fragmenta Phytographiae Australiae

Species of shrub

Dodonaea concinna is a species of plant in the family Sapindaceae and is endemic to the south-west of Western Australia. It is a dense, erect, rounded shrub with paripinnate leaves with four to twelve linear leaflets, flowers arranged singly, in pairs or threes with eight stamens, and four-winged capsules with leathery wings.

== Description ==
Dodonaea concinna is a dioecious, dense, erect, rounded, compact shrub that typically grows to a height of up to 1.5 m (4 ft 11 in). Its leaves are paripinnate, 4–8 mm (0.16–0.31 in) long with four to twelve linear leaflets 4.5–9 mm (0.18–0.35 in) long and 0.7–1 mm (0.028–0.039 in) wide on a petiole 2.5–6 mm (0.098–0.236 in) long. The flowers are borne singly, in pairs or threes, each flower on a pedicel 3.6–5.5 mm (0.14–0.22 in) long. The four sepals are egg-shaped, 2.0–2.4 mm (0.079–0.094 in) long, but that fall off as the flowers open. Each flower has eight stamens and the ovary is glabrous. The fruit is usually a four-winged, broadly elliptic capsule 9–11 mm (0.35–0.43 in) long and 8.5–12.5 mm (0.33–0.49 in) wide, with leathery wings 2.5–4.0 mm (0.098–0.157 in) wide.

== Taxonomy and naming ==
Dodonaea concinna was first formally described in 1863 by George Bentham in his Flora Australiensis from specimens collected by Ferdinand von Mueller in 1859. The specific epithet (concinna) means 'neat, pretty or elegant'.

== Distribution and habitat ==
This species of Dodonaea grows in eucalypt mallee scrub from the Pingrup-Borden area to the Salmon Gums area, in the Coolgardie, Esperance Plains and Mallee bioregions of south-western Western Australia.

== Conservation status ==
Dodonaea concinna is listed as "not threatened" by the Government of Western Australia Department of Biodiversity, Conservation and Attractions.
