= Dodonaea scurra =

Scientific classification
- Kingdom: Plantae
- Clade: Tracheophytes
- Clade: Angiosperms
- Clade: Eudicots
- Clade: Rosids
- Order: Sapindales
- Family: Sapindaceae
- Genus: Dodonaea
- Species: D. scurra

Binomial name
- Dodonaea scurra K.A.Sheph. & R.A.Meissn.

Species of plant

Dodonaea scurra is a species of flowering plant in the family Sapindaceae and is endemic to inland areas of Western Australia. It is a dioecious, multi-stemmed shrub with simple, sessile, linear leaves, flowers arranged singly in leaf axils with four sepals, six stamens and spherical capsules with three narrowly triangular, crusty appendages.

== Description ==
Dodonaea scurra is an erect, multi-stemmed, dioecious shrub that typically grows to a height of 0.4–1 m (1 ft 4 in – 3 ft 3 in) and has scattered white hairs on its young stems and leaves. Its branchlets are erect and woody with 4 to 8 leaves clustered at nodes. The leaves are simple, sessile, 2.0–12 mm (0.079–0.472 in) long and about 0.3–0.7 mm (0.012–0.028 in) wide, rarely with up to three lobes. The flowers are arranged singly in leaf axils, with four narrowly egg-shaped sepals, 1.7–2.2 mm (0.067–0.087 in) long with the narrower end towards the base, the six stamens about as long as the sepals. Flowering occurs from August to October and the capsules are crust-like, spherical to elliptic, 2.5–4 mm (0.098–0.157 in) long, 3.0–6.6 mm (0.12–0.26 in) wide and with three narrowly triangular appendages 2.1–6.3 mm (0.083–0.248 in) long.

== Taxonomy ==
Dodonaea scurra was first formally described in 2007 by Kelly Anne Shepherd and Rachel Meissner in the journal Nuytsia. The specific epithet (scurra) means 'jester', referring to the fruiting capsules that are reminiscent of a court jester's cap.

== Distribution and habitat ==
This species of Dodonaea grows in shrubland on the upper crests of banded ironstone outcrops, and is only known from the Koolanooka Hills east of Morawa in the Avon Wheatbelt bioregion.

== Conservation status ==
Dodonaea scurra is listed as "Priority One" by the Western Australian Government Department of Biodiversity, Conservation and Attractions, meaning that it is known from only one or a few locations which are potentially at risk.
