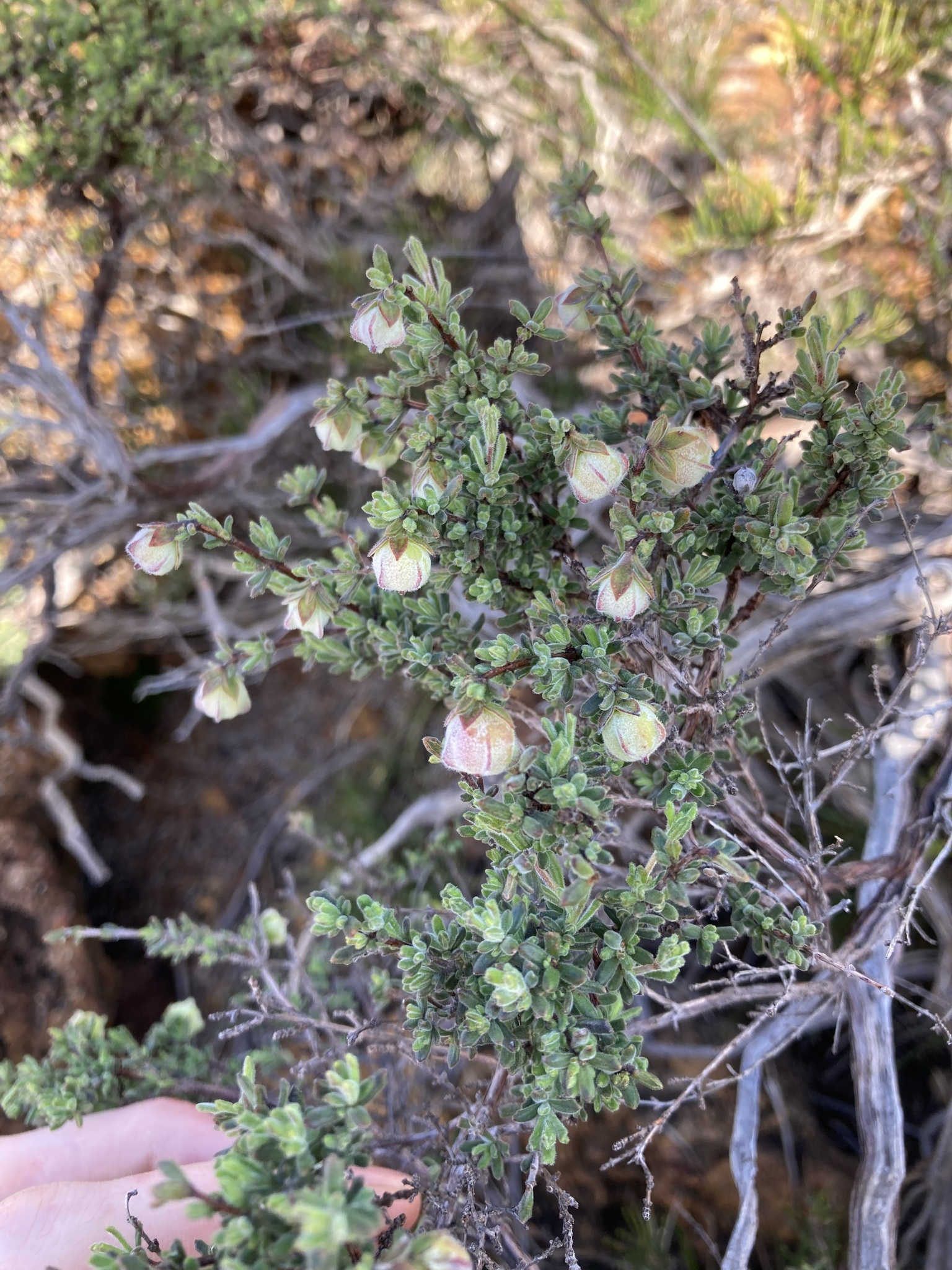
- Along the road to Jurien Bay

Scientific classification
- Kingdom: Plantae
- Clade: Tracheophytes
- Clade: Angiosperms
- Clade: Eudicots
- Clade: Rosids
- Order: Sapindales
- Family: Sapindaceae
- Genus: Dodonaea
- Species: D. ericoides

Binomial name
- Dodonaea ericoides Miq.

Synonyms
- Dodonaea cryptandroides Diels

= Dodonaea ericoides =

Species of shrub

Dodonaea ericoides is a species of plant in the family Sapindaceae and is endemic to the south-west of Western Australia. It is an erect shrub with simple, usually linear leaves arranged in opposite pairs and with the edges turned strongly down, flowers arranged singly with eight stamens, and four-angled capsules with lobe-like appendages.

== Description ==
Dodonaea ericoides is an erect, dioecious shrub that typically grows to a height of up to 80 cm (31 in). Its leaves are usually linear, 2–15 mm (0.079–0.591 in) long and 1–2 mm (0.039–0.079 in) wide with the edges strongly turned down, sometimes with two to four lobes or teeth near the ends. The flowers are borne singly on a pedicel 0.5–2 mm (0.020–0.079 in) long, with four egg-shaped sepals 2.5–5.5 mm (0.098–0.217 in) long, eight stamens and an ovary covered with soft hairs. Flowering occurs from March to June, and the fruit is a four-angled, more or less round or broadly egg-shaped capsule, 4–9 mm (0.16–0.35 in) long, 5–8 mm (0.20–0.31 in) wide, with crusty, lobe-like appendages 0.5–1 mm (0.020–0.039 in) wide.

== Taxonomy and naming ==
Dodonaea ericoides was first formally described in 1845 by Friedrich Anton Wilhelm Miquel in the Lehmann's Plantae Preissianae from specimens collected in the inland of Western Australia. The specific epithet (ericoides) means 'Erica-like'.

== Distribution and habitat ==
This species of Dodonaea grows in woodland and low heath on rocky hillsides and is restricted to a few populations from north of Geraldton to south of Perth in the Avon Wheatbelt, Geraldton Sandplains, Jarrah Forest and Swan Coastal Plain bioregions of south-western Western Australia.

== Conservation status ==
Dodonaea ericoides is listed as "not threatened" by the Government of Western Australia Department of Biodiversity, Conservation and Attractions.
