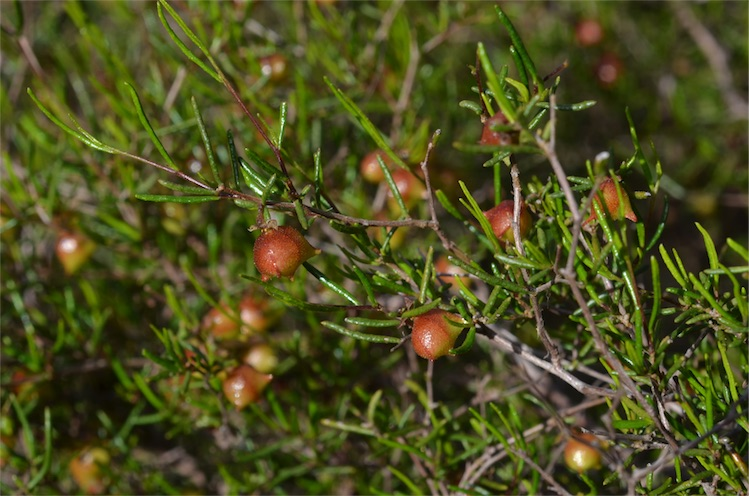
- In Wanilla Land Settlement Conservation Park

Scientific classification
- Kingdom: Plantae
- Clade: Tracheophytes
- Clade: Angiosperms
- Clade: Eudicots
- Clade: Rosids
- Order: Sapindales
- Family: Sapindaceae
- Genus: Dodonaea
- Species: D. hexandra

Binomial name
- Dodonaea hexandra F.Muell.

= Dodonaea hexandra =

Species of shrub

Dodonaea hexandra, commonly known as horned hop bush, is a species of plant in the family Sapindaceae and is native to scattered parts of Australia, mostly in the south of South Australia. It is a spreading, dioecious shrub with simple leaves, flowers arranged singly with six stamens, and spherical, three-angled capsules.

== Description ==
Dodonaea hexandra is a spreading dioecious shrub that typically grows to a height of up to 60 cm (24 in). Its leaves are simple, sessile, mostly 4–14 mm (0.16–0.55 in) long and 0.5–2 mm (0.020–0.079 in) wide. The flowers are borne singly in leaf axils or on the ends of branches on a pedicel 1–2 mm (0.039–0.079 in) long. The three sepals are egg-shaped, 1.5–3.6 mm (0.059–0.142 in) long and there are six stamens about the same length as the sepals, the ovary glabrous. Flowering occurs from May to July, and the fruit is a glabrous, three-angled capsule 5–7 mm (0.20–0.28 in) long and 5–8 mm (0.20–0.31 in) wide, the appendages often absent, or if present, lobe-like and crust-like, 0.5 mm (0.020 in) wide.

== Taxonomy and naming ==
Dodonaea hexandra was first formally described in 1855 by Ferdinand von Mueller in his Definitions of rare or hitherto undescribed Australian plants from specimens collected by Johann Friedrich Carl Wilhelmi near Port Lincoln. The specific epithet (hexandra) means 'six stamens'.

== Distribution and habitat ==
This species of Dodonaea grows in mallee scrub dominated by tree species in the south of South Australia, the far south of Western Australia, and far north-western Victoria.

== Conservation status ==
Dodonaea hexandra is listed as "Priority One" by the Government of Western Australia Department of Biodiversity, Conservation and Attractions, meaning that it is known from only one or a few locations where it is potentially at risk.
