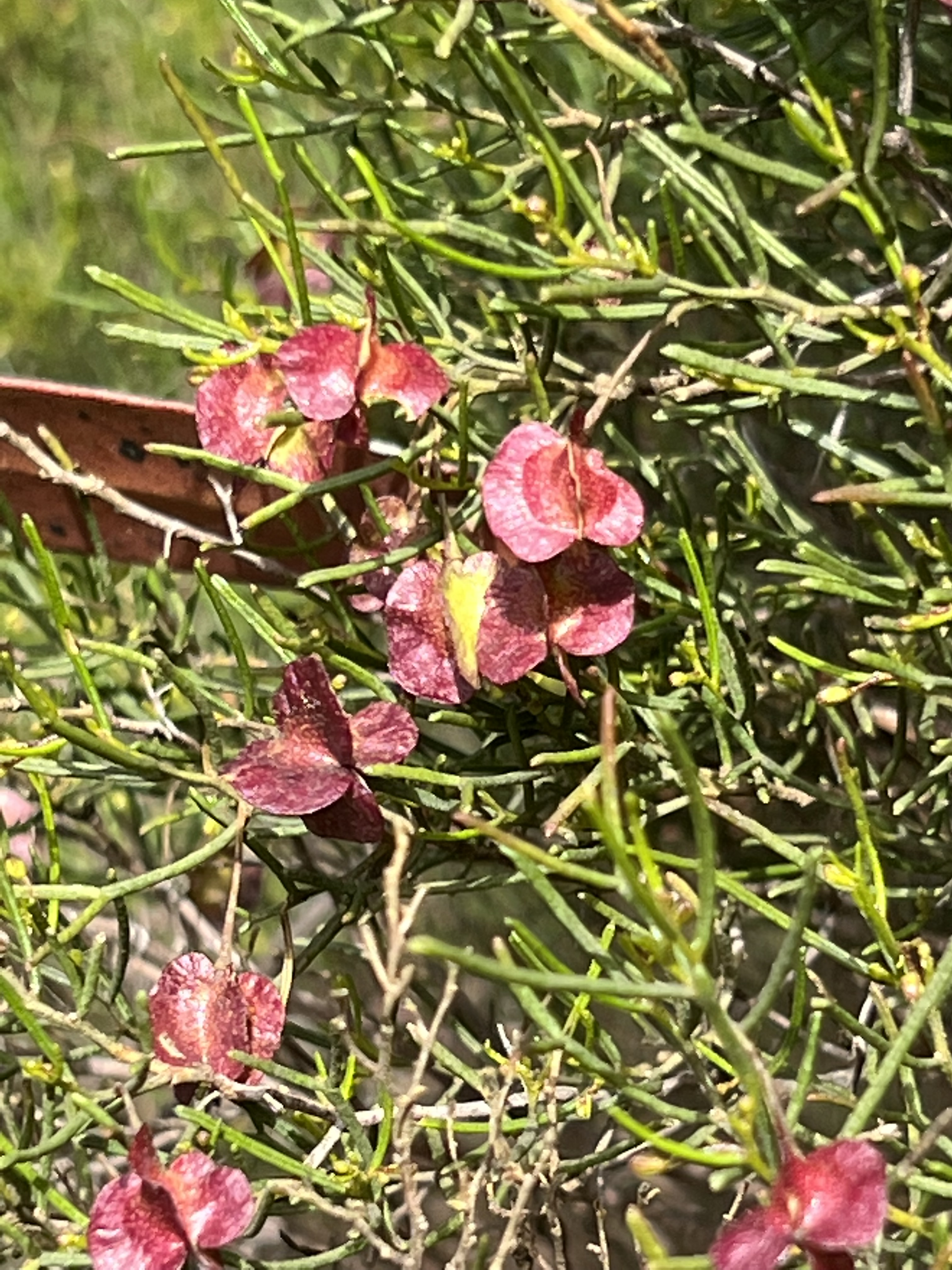

Scientific classification
- Kingdom: Plantae
- Clade: Embryophytes
- Clade: Tracheophytes
- Clade: Spermatophytes
- Clade: Angiosperms
- Clade: Eudicots
- Clade: Rosids
- Order: Sapindales
- Family: Sapindaceae
- Genus: Dodonaea
- Species: D. stenozyga

Binomial name
- Dodonaea stenozyga F.Muell.

= Dodonaea stenozyga =

Desert hop-bush

Species of shrub

Dodonaea stenozyga, commonly known as desert hop-bush, is a species of flowering plant in the family Sapindaceae and is endemic to southern parts of continental Australia. It is a small, upright shrub with small clusters of flowers and linear leaves.

== Description ==
Dodonaea stenozyga is an upright, rounded shrub to 1.5 m (4 ft 11 in) high with paripinnate leaves 1–3.8 cm (0.39–1.50 in) long on a petiole 9.5–20 mm (0.37–0.79 in) long, the 2 to 6 linear leaflets 8–13.5 mm (0.31–0.53 in) long, rounded at the apex, sometimes with the edges turned down. The flowers are usually in pairs or in a group of 3, each flower on a pedicel 4–8.5 mm (0.16–0.33 in) long, with 4 oval-shaped sepals, 1.5–3.2 mm (0.059–0.126 in) long and falling off early. Flowering has been recorded in September and the fruit is a 4-winged, broadly elliptic to broadly egg-shaped capsule 8.5–14.5 mm (0.33–0.57 in) long and 10–17 mm (0.39–0.67 in) wide, the wings 3–6.5 mm (0.12–0.26 in) wide, smooth and leathery.

== Taxonomy ==
Dodonaea stenozyga was first formally described in 1859 by Ferdinand von Mueller and the description was published in his Fragmenta Phytographiae Australiae from specimens collected near the junction of the Darling and Murray Rivers. The specific epithet (stenozyga) means "joined" in reference to the pinnate leaflets.

== Distribution and habitat ==
Desert hop-bush grows in semi-arid locations in mallee scrub or open woodland in Victoria, South Australia, New South Wales and Western Australia.
