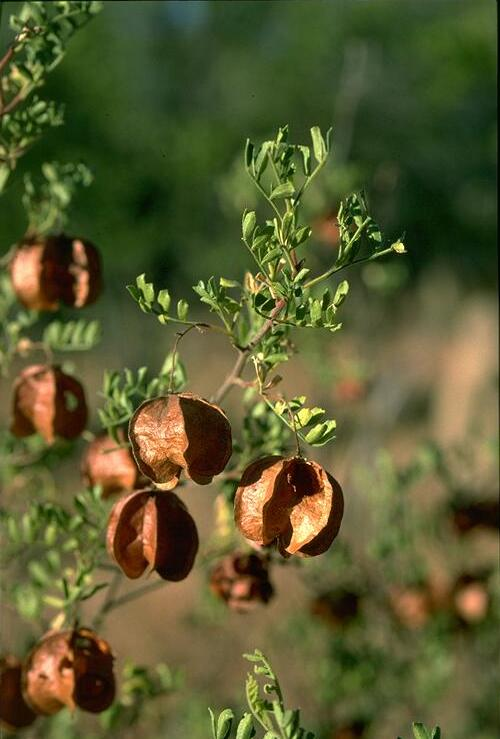

Scientific classification
- Kingdom: Plantae
- Clade: Tracheophytes
- Clade: Angiosperms
- Clade: Eudicots
- Clade: Rosids
- Order: Sapindales
- Family: Sapindaceae
- Genus: Dodonaea
- Species: D. physocarpa

Binomial name
- Dodonaea physocarpa F.Muell.

= Dodonaea physocarpa =

Species of plant

Dodonaea physocarpa is a species of plant in the family Sapindaceae and is endemic to northern Australia. It is a spreading, usually dioecious shrub with paripinnate leaves with six to ten oblong to egg-shaped leaflets, the narrower end towards the base, flowers arranged in cymes, the flowers with four to six sepals and ten to twelve stamens, and greatly inflated, elliptic capsules with five or six wings.

== Description ==
Dodonaea physocarpa is a spreading, usually dioecious shrub that typically grows to a height of up to 2 m (6 ft 7 in). Its leaves are paripinnate, 13–30 mm (0.51–1.18 in) long, on a petiole 4–14 mm (0.16–0.55 in) long with six to ten oblong to egg-shaped leaflets 9–12 mm (0.35–0.47 in) long and 2–5 mm (0.079–0.197 in) wide, often with two or three teeth on the end. The flowers are arranged singly or in small numbers in cymes, each flower on a pedicel usually 8–13 mm (0.31–0.51 in) long, with four to six lance-shaped to egg-shaped sepals, 2–3.6 mm (0.079–0.142 in) long but that fall off as the flowers develop, and eight to twelve stamens. The ovary is hairy and the fruit is a greatly inflated five or six-winged capsule, 18–26 mm (0.71–1.02 in) long and 17–25 mm (0.67–0.98 in) wide with membranous wings 1.0–2.5 mm (0.039–0.098 in) wide.

== Taxonomy ==
Dodonaea physocarpa was first formally described in 1857 by Ferdinand von Mueller in Hooker's Journal of Botany and Kew Garden Miscellany. The specific epithet (physocarpa) means 'bladdery-fruited'.

== Distribution and habitat ==
This species of Dodonaea grows in low, open woodland in the Kimberley region of Western Australia, in the north of the Northern Territory and north-eastern Queensland.

== Conservation status ==
Dodonaea physocarpa is listed as "not threatened" by the Government of Western Australia Department of Biodiversity, Conservation and Attractions and as of "least concern" under the Territory Parks and Wildlife Conservation Act and the Queensland Government Nature Conservation Act 1992.
