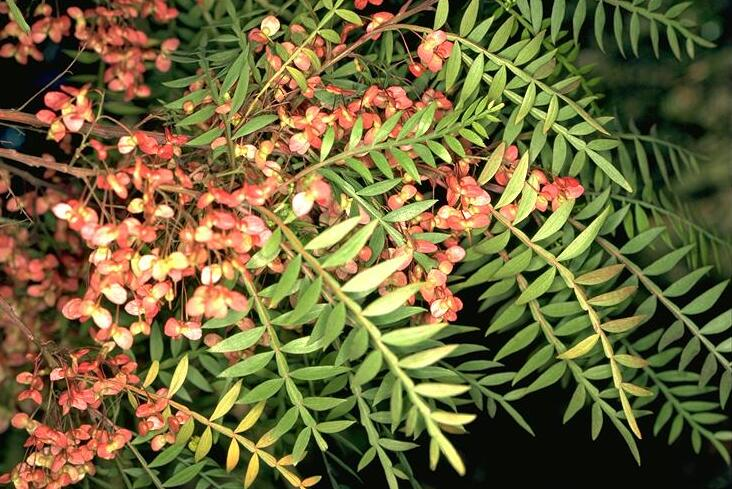

Scientific classification
- Kingdom: Plantae
- Clade: Tracheophytes
- Clade: Angiosperms
- Clade: Eudicots
- Clade: Rosids
- Order: Sapindales
- Family: Sapindaceae
- Genus: Dodonaea
- Species: D. megazyga

Binomial name
- Dodonaea megazyga (F.Muell.) & F.Muell. ex Benth.

Synonyms
- Dodonaea viscosa var. megazyga F.Muell.

= Dodonaea megazyga =

Species of shrub

Dodonaea megazyga is a species of plant in the family Sapindaceae and is endemic to eastern Australia. It is an erect shrub or small shrub with imparipinnate leaves with usually 19 to 31 lance-shaped leaflets, flowers arranged in cymes, the flowers with three or four sepals and eight stamens, and capsules with 3 wings.

== Description ==
Dodonaea megazyga is an erect, dioecious shrub or small tree that typically grows to a height of up to 5 m (16 ft). Its leaves are imparipinnate, 72–145 mm (2.8–5.7 in) long on a petiole 18–30 mm (0.71–1.18 in) long, with between 19 and 31 lance-shaped leaflets 17–24.5 mm (0.67–0.96 in) long and 4–7.5 mm (0.16–0.30 in) wide with a wedge-shaped base. The flowers are arranged in large numbers in a cyme, each flower on a pedicel 2.2–7 mm (0.087–0.276 in) long with three or four lance-shaped to broadly egg-shaped or broadly oblong sepals, 1.8–2.7 mm (0.071–0.106 in) long that fall off as the flowers open, and eight stamens. The ovary is covered with a few soft hairs. The fruit is a glabrous, three-winged, egg-shaped capsule 7.5–10.5 mm (0.30–0.41 in) long and 13.5–22.5 mm (0.53–0.89 in) wide.

== Taxonomy ==
This species was first formally described in 1862 by Ferdinand von Mueller who gave it the name Dodonaea viscosa var. megazyga in his The Plants Indigenous to the Colony of Victoria from specimens collected by Hermann Beckler "in the warm, damp forest valleys of the Hastings River". In 1863, George Bentham raised the variety to species status as Dodonaea megazyga in Flora Australiensis.

== Distribution and habitat ==
This species of Dodonaea grows in forest or near rainforest from south-east Queensland to the Wollemi National Park area of New South Wales.

== Conservation status ==
Dodonaea megazyga is listed as of "least concern" under the Queensland Government Nature Conservation Act 1992.
