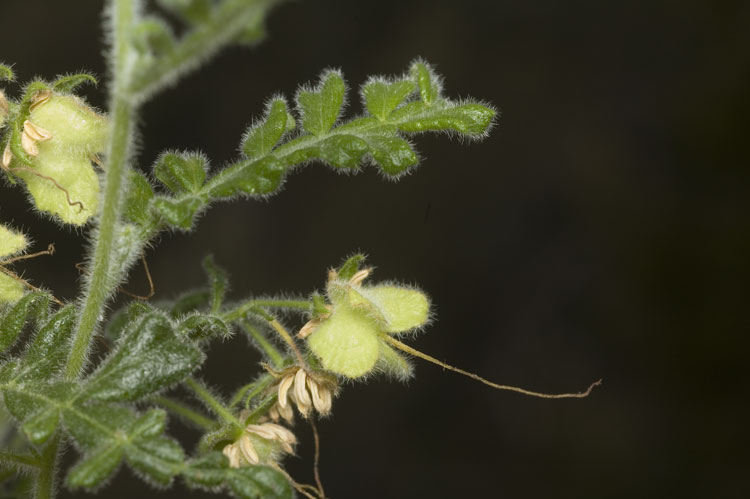
- In the Australian National Botanic Gardens

Conservation status
- Vulnerable (EPBC Act)

Scientific classification
- Kingdom: Plantae
- Clade: Tracheophytes
- Clade: Angiosperms
- Clade: Eudicots
- Clade: Rosids
- Order: Sapindales
- Family: Sapindaceae
- Genus: Dodonaea
- Species: D. rupicola

Binomial name
- Dodonaea rupicola C.T.White

= Dodonaea rupicola =

Species of plant

Dodonaea rupicola is a species of flowering plant in the family Sapindaceae and is endemic to the Glass House Mountains in Queensland, Australia. It is a dioecious, spreading shrub with imparipinnate leaves, flowers in panicles with four sepals, and capsules with four hairy, leathery wings.

== Description ==
Dodonaea rupicola is a spreading dioecious shrub that typically grows to a height of up to 1 m (3 ft 3 in). Its leaves are imparipinnate, 15–35 mm (0.59–1.38 in) long on a petiole 3–8 mm (0.12–0.31 in) long, with 10 to 18 oblong to lance-shaped leaflets with the narrower end towards the base, 4–9.5 mm (0.16–0.37 in) long and 2–4 mm (0.079–0.157 in) wide. The leaflets are sometimes wavy, often have their edges turned down and have a wedge-shaped base. The flowers are arranged in panicles on the ends of branchlets, each flower on a pedicel 2.0–2.5 mm (0.079–0.098 in) long. The flowers have four lance-shaped or egg-shaped sepals 2.5–4 mm (0.098–0.157 in) long, eight stamens and a hairy ovary. The fruit is a hairy, four-winged, elliptic capsule, 7.5–9 mm (0.30–0.35 in) long and 12–15 mm (0.47–0.59 in) wide, the wings 3–4 mm (0.12–0.16 in) wide and leathery.

== Taxonomy ==
Dodonaea rupicola was first formally described in 1926 by Cyril Tenison White in the journal The Queensland Naturalist from specimens he collected "growing between rocks" on Saddle-back Mountain in the Glass House Mountains district in 1926. The specific epithet (rupicola) means 'rock inhabitant'.

== Distribution and habitat ==
This species of Dodonaea grows among rocks in the Glass House Mountains on low hill crests and moderately to steeply inclined slopes in open shrubland to tall woodlands, between 40–160 m (130–520 ft) above sea level.

== Conservation status ==
Dodonaea rigida is listed as "vulnerable" under the Australian Government Environment Protection and Biodiversity Conservation Act 1999 and the Queensland Government Nature Conservation Act 1992. The main threats to the species are inappropriate fire regimes and weed invasion.
