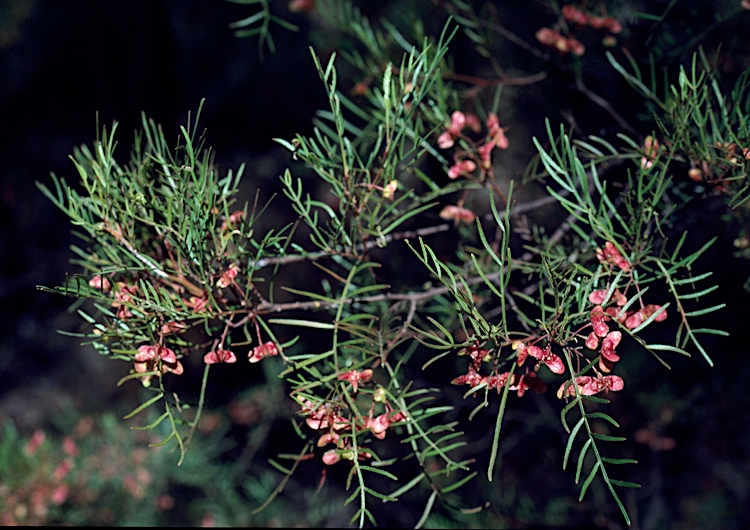
- In Carnarvon Gorge

Scientific classification
- Kingdom: Plantae
- Clade: Tracheophytes
- Clade: Angiosperms
- Clade: Eudicots
- Clade: Rosids
- Order: Sapindales
- Family: Sapindaceae
- Genus: Dodonaea
- Species: D. tenuifolia

Binomial name
- Dodonaea tenuifolia Lindl.

= Dodonaea tenuifolia =

Species of plant

Dodonaea tenuifolia is a species of flowering plant in the family Sapindaceae and is endemic to Queensland, Australia. It is a spreading, dioecious shrub with imparipinnate leaves with 9 to 25 side leaflets, flowers in groups of six to ten in axillary cymes, each flower with four sepals, and capsules with four leathery wings.

== Description ==
Dodonaea tenuifolia is a spreading, dioecious shrub that typically grows to a height of up to 3 m (9.8 ft). Its leaves are imparipinnate 45–95 mm (1.8–3.7 in) long on a petiole 8.5–18 mm (0.33–0.71 in) long, with mostly 9 to 25 glabrous, linear side leaflets, mostly 9–22 mm (0.35–0.87 in) long, 1–2 mm (0.039–0.079 in) wide and usually shallowly channelled on the upper surface with a narrowly wedge-shaped base. The flowers are arranged in axils in cymes of 6 to 10, each flower on a pedicel 6.5–9 mm (0.26–0.35 in) long. The flowers have four egg-shaped sepals 1.5–1.6 mm (0.059–0.063 in) long that fall off as the flowers open and a glabrous ovary. The fruit is a glabrous, four-winged, oblong capsule, mostly 4.5–5.0 mm (0.18–0.20 in) long and 10.5–20 mm (0.41–0.79 in) wide, the wings leathery and 2.5–5 mm (0.098–0.197 in) wide.

== Taxonomy ==
Dodonaea tenuifolia was first formally described in 1848 by John Lindley in Thomas Mitchell's Journal of an Expedition into the Interior of Tropical Australia. The specific epithet (tenuifolia) means 'thin- or narrow-leaved'.

== Distribution and habitat ==
This species of Dodonaea occurs mainly between the Atherton Tableland and areas close to the New South Wales border in eastern Queensland where it grows on rocky hillside, often in open forest.

== Conservation status ==
Dodonaea tenuifolia is listed as of "least concern" under the Queensland Government Nature Conservation Act 1992.
