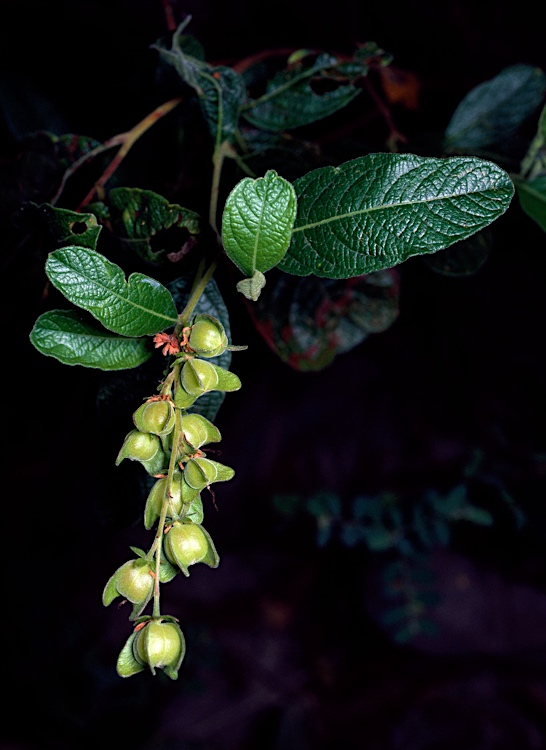
- In Umbrawarra Gorge Nature Park

Scientific classification
- Kingdom: Plantae
- Clade: Tracheophytes
- Clade: Angiosperms
- Clade: Eudicots
- Clade: Rosids
- Order: Sapindales
- Family: Sapindaceae
- Genus: Dodonaea
- Species: D. arnhemica

Binomial name
- Dodonaea arnhemica (S.T.Reynolds) M.G.Harr.

Synonyms
- Distichostemon arnhemicus S.T.Reynolds

= Dodonaea arnhemica =

Species of flowering plant

Dodonaea arnhemica is a species of plant in the family Sapindaceae and is endemic to the north of the Northern Territory. It is a shrub with oblong or elliptic leaves, flowers arranged singly or in racemes, and capsules with four or five broad wings.

== Description ==
Dodonaea arnhemica is a shrub that typically grows to a height of up to 3.5 m (11 ft). Its leaves are oblong or elliptic, 50–145 mm (2.0–5.7 in) long and 20–42 mm (0.79–1.65 in) wide on a petiole 4–15 mm (0.16–0.59 in) long and covered with soft hairs. The flowers are borne singly or in racemes on the ends of branches, each flower on a pedicel 4–21 mm (0.16–0.83 in) long, with six or seven egg-shaped to oblong sepals 3–5 mm (0.12–0.20 in) long and 14–24 stamens. The ovary is heart-shaped and densely covered with soft hairs, the style 1–3.5 mm (0.039–0.138 in) long. The fruit is an oval capsule, 8–18 mm (0.31–0.71 in) long and up to 25 mm (0.98 in) wide, with four or five broad wings 6–8.5 mm (0.24–0.33 in) wide.

== Taxonomy ==
This species was first formally described in 1984 by Sally T. Reynolds who gave it the name Distichostemon arnhemicus in the journal Austrobaileya, based on specimens collected in 1973 on Mount Brockman in the Northern Territory. In 2010, M.G. Harrington transferred the species to Dodonaea as D. arnhemica in Australian Systematic Botany. The specific epithet (arnhemica) refers to Arnhem Land, where the species occurs.

== Distribution and habitat ==
This species of Dodonaea is common in mineralised areas of Arnhem Land, where it grows in sandstone gullies, gorges and escarpments, often near creeks.

== Conservation status ==
Dodonaea arnhemica is listed as "least concern" under the Northern Territory Government Territory Parks and Wildlife Conservation Act.
