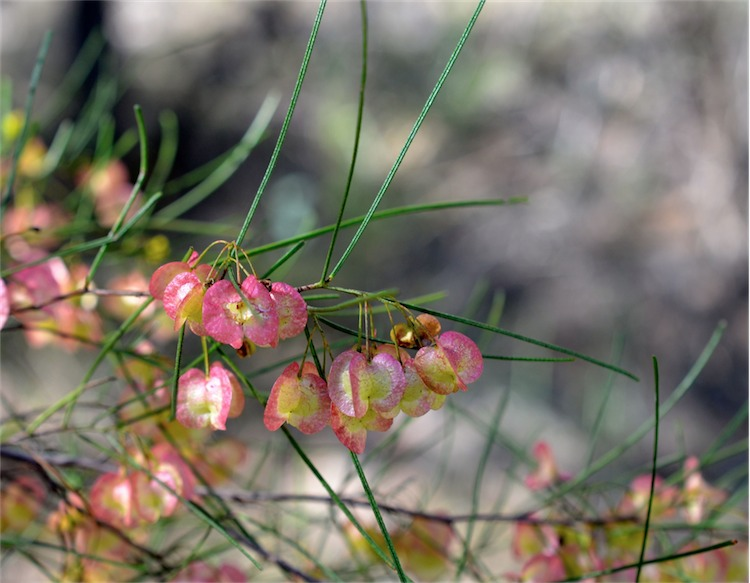
- In Carnarvon Station Reserve

Scientific classification
- Kingdom: Plantae
- Clade: Tracheophytes
- Clade: Angiosperms
- Clade: Eudicots
- Clade: Rosids
- Order: Sapindales
- Family: Sapindaceae
- Genus: Dodonaea
- Species: D. filifolia

Binomial name
- Dodonaea filifolia Hook.

= Dodonaea filifolia =

Species of flowering plant

Dodonaea filifolia, commonly known as thread-leaved hop-bush, is a species of plant in the family Sapindaceae and is endemic to Queensland. It is an erect shrub or small tree with simple, linear to thread-like leaves, flowers arranged in cymes on the ends of branches each flower with eight stamens, and 4-winged capsules.

== Description ==
Dodonaea filifolia is a dioecious erect shrub or small tree that typically grows to a height of up to 5 m (16 ft). Its leaves are simple, sessile, linear to thread-like, 55–105 mm (2.2–4.1 in) long, about 1 mm (0.039 in) wide and glabrous. The flowers are borne in five- or six-flowered cymes on the ends of branches, each flower on a pedicel 3.3–7.5 mm (0.13–0.30 in) long, with eight stamens. The sepals are lance-shaped, 1.2–1.5 mm (0.047–0.059 in) long but fall off as the flowers develop and the ovary is usually glabrous. The fruit is a four-winged capsule 9.5–12.5 mm (0.37–0.49 in) long and 11.5–13 mm (0.45–0.51 in) wide, the wings membranous or sometimes leathery, 2.5–4 mm (0.098–0.157 in) wide.

== Taxonomy and naming ==
Dodonaea filifolia was first formally described in 1848 by William Jackson Hooker in Thomas Mitchell's Journal of an Expedition into the Interior of Tropical Australia. The specific epithet (filifolia) means 'thread-leaved'.

== Distribution and habitat ==
This species of Dodonaea grows in low, open eucalypt forest on sandstone plateaus and hills in eastern Queensland south from the Mitchell River.

== Conservation status ==
Dodonaea filifolia is listed as of "least concern" under the Queensland Government Nature Conservation Act 1992.
