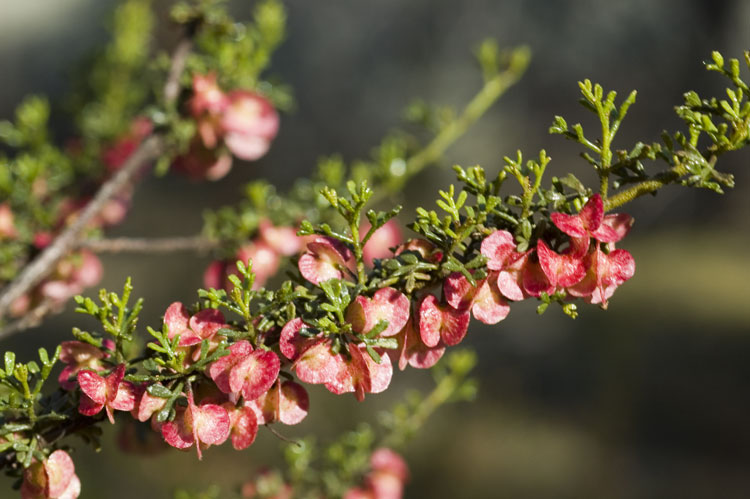

Scientific classification
- Kingdom: Plantae
- Clade: Tracheophytes
- Clade: Angiosperms
- Clade: Eudicots
- Clade: Rosids
- Order: Sapindales
- Family: Sapindaceae
- Genus: Dodonaea
- Species: D. adenophora

Binomial name
- Dodonaea adenophora Miq.

Synonyms
- Dodonaea adenophora Miq. var. adenophora; Thouinia adenophora Miq. nom. inval., nom. nud.; Thouinia adenophora Miq.; Dodonaea boroniifolia auct. non G.Don

= Dodonaea adenophora =

Species of shrub

Dodonaea adenophora is a species of plant in the family Sapindaceae and is endemic to the south-west of Western Australia. It is an erect or spreading shrub with imparipinnate leaves, usually with four or six leaflets, single or paired flowers and capsules with four wings.

== Description ==
Dodonaea adenophora is a dioecious, erect or spreading shrub that typically grows to a height of up to 2.5 m (8 ft 2 in). The leaves are imparipinnate on a petiole 1–3 mm (0.039–0.118 in) long, with usually four to six narrowly egg-shaped to egg-shaped leaflets with the narrower end towards the base, sometimes folded in half lengthwise, 1.5–3.5 mm (0.059–0.138 in) long and 0.8–1.5 mm (0.031–0.059 in) wide. The flowers are borne singly or in pairs on a pedicel 2.0–3.5 mm (0.079–0.138 in) long, with four egg-shaped sepals 1.0–1.8 mm (0.039–0.071 in) long, but that fall off as the flowers open, six to eight stamens and an ovary covered with soft hairs. The fruit is a four-winged capsule, 6.0–7.5 mm (0.24–0.30 in) long, 8–10 mm (0.31–0.39 in) wide, with membranous wings 1.5–2.5 mm (0.059–0.098 in) wide.

== Taxonomy and naming ==
Dodonaea adenophora was first formally described in 1844 by Friedrich Anton Wilhelm Miquel in the journal Linnaea from specimens collected near the Swan River. The specific epithet (adenophora) means 'gland-bearing'.

== Distribution and habitat ==
This species of Dodonaea grows in mallee scrub and open woodland in granite sand and red loamy soils and is widespread in the south-west of Western Australia from Geraldton and Meekatharra and east, almost to the border with South Australia, in the Avon Wheatbelt, Coolgardie, Geraldton Sandplains, Great Victoria Desert, Jarrah Forest, Mallee, Murchison and Yalgoo bioregions.
