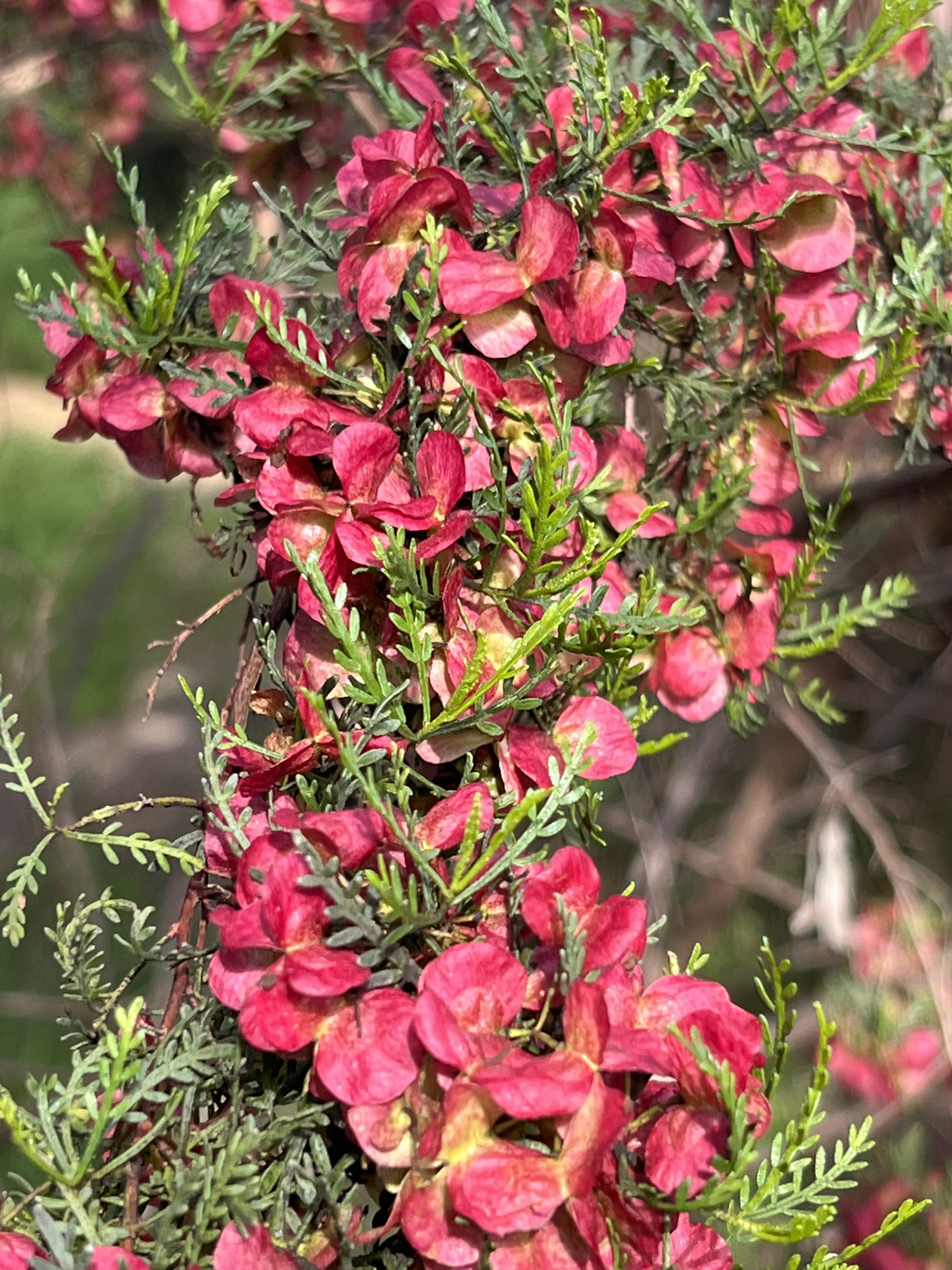

Scientific classification
- Kingdom: Plantae
- Clade: Tracheophytes
- Clade: Angiosperms
- Clade: Eudicots
- Clade: Rosids
- Order: Sapindales
- Family: Sapindaceae
- Genus: Dodonaea
- Species: D. subglandulifera

Binomial name
- Dodonaea subglandulifera J.G.West

= Dodonaea subglandulifera =

Peep Hill hop-bush

Species of shrub

Dodonaea subglandulifera, commonly known as Peep Hill hop-bush, is a species of plant in the family Sapindaceae and is endemic to South Australia. It is a small, upright shrub with flowers in small groups that are yellow-greenish to red-maroon.

== Description ==
Dodonaea subglandulifera is an upright shrub 1–2 m (3 ft 3 in – 6 ft 7 in) high with imparipinnate leaves 0.7–1.6 cm (0.28–0.63 in) long, leaflets linear, rounded at the apex, mostly entire or sometimes with a few teeth, sticky, glandular on the lower surface, smooth, and on a petiole 1–3 mm (0.039–0.118 in) long. The flowers are in groups of 2-3 borne in leaf axils on a pedicel 3.5–6.5 mm (0.14–0.26 in) long, sepals oval-shaped, 1.6–2.5 mm (0.063–0.098 in) long and falling off early. Flowering occurs from February to August and the fruit is a 3 or 4 winged capsule, elliptic to egg-shaped and with occasional hairs.

== Taxonomy ==
Dodonaea subglandulifera was first formally described in 1984 by Judith Gay West and the description was published in Brunonia.

== Distribution and habitat ==
Peep Hill hop-bush grows in semi-arid locations in south-eastern South Australia.
