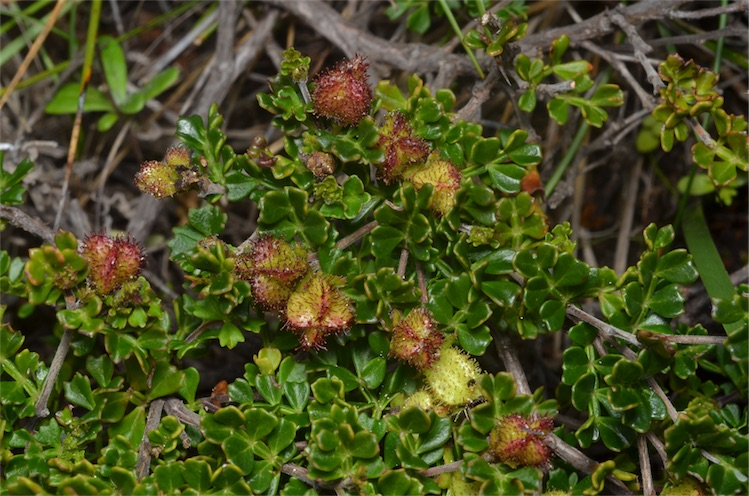
- In Coffin Bay National Park

Scientific classification
- Kingdom: Plantae
- Clade: Tracheophytes
- Clade: Angiosperms
- Clade: Eudicots
- Clade: Rosids
- Order: Sapindales
- Family: Sapindaceae
- Genus: Dodonaea
- Species: D. humilis

Binomial name
- Dodonaea humilis Endl.

= Dodonaea humilis =

Species of flowering plant

Dodonaea humilis, commonly known as limestone hop-bush, is a species of flowering plant in the family Sapindaceae and is endemic to southern South Australia. It is a dioecious, spreading shrub with imparipinnate leaves with two to fourteen mostly glabrous leaflets, flowers arranged singly or in cymes, and oblong capsules with four lobes.

== Description ==
Dodonaea humilis is a dioecious, spreading shrub that typically grows to a height of up to 1 m (3 ft 3 in). Its leaves are imparipinnate, 9–26 mm (0.35–1.02 in) long with two to fourteen glabrous, triangular or egg-shaped leaflets with the narrower end towards the base, 3–8 mm (0.12–0.31 in) long and 2–7 mm (0.079–0.276 in) wide with three to seven teeth near the tip. The petiole is 1–4 mm (0.039–0.157 in) long. The flowers are arranged singly or in cymes on the ends of branches, each flower on a pedicel 1.5–4 mm (0.059–0.157 in) long. There are four lance-shaped or egg-shaped sepals 1.8–2.8 mm (0.071–0.110 in) long and eight stamens, the ovary glabrous. The fruit is an oblong capsule 4.5–7 mm (0.18–0.28 in) long, 4.5–6 mm (0.18–0.24 in) wide with four lobes and densely covered with glandular hairs.

== Taxonomy ==
Dodonaea humilis was first formally described in 1835 by Stephan Endlicher in his Atakta Botanika. The specific epithet (humilis) means 'low-growing'.

== Distribution and habitat ==
This species of Dodonaea grows in mallee scrub on limestone or chalky soils on the Eyre, Yorke and Fleurieu Peninsulas in southern South Australia.
