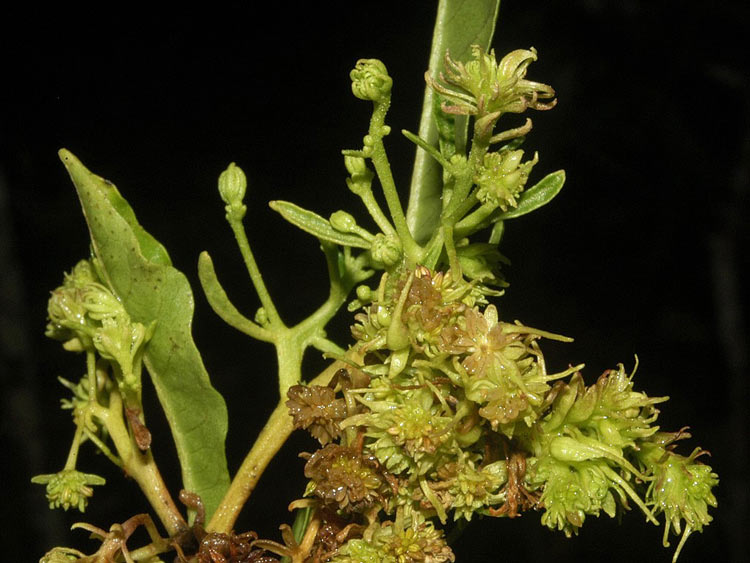

Scientific classification
- Kingdom: Plantae
- Clade: Tracheophytes
- Clade: Angiosperms
- Clade: Eudicots
- Clade: Rosids
- Order: Sapindales
- Family: Sapindaceae
- Genus: Dodonaea
- Species: D. polyandra

Binomial name
- Dodonaea polyandra Merr. & L.M.Perry

Synonyms
- Dodonaea viscosa subf. laurina Radlk.; Dodonaea viscosa var. laurina Britten nom. inval.; Dodonaea viscosa α vulgaris auct. non Benth.: Bentham, G. (30 May 1863)

= Dodonaea polyandra =

Species of shrub

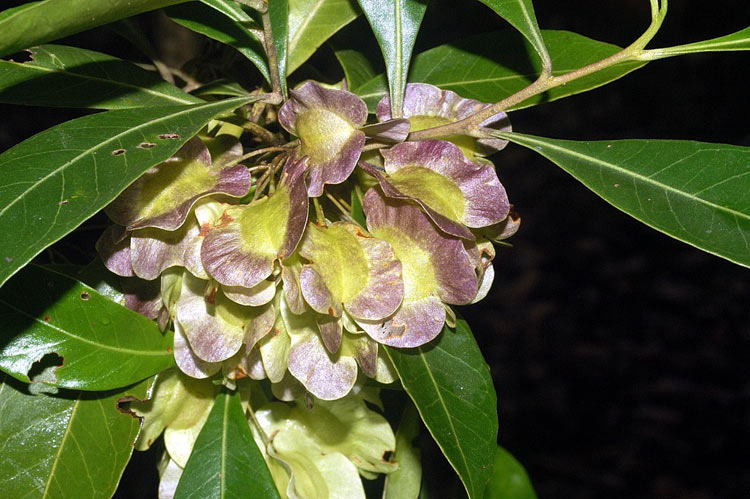
Fruit

Dodonaea polyandra is a species of plant in the family Sapindaceae and is native to Queensland, Australia and New Guinea. It is a spreading, dioecious shrub or tree with simple elliptic leaves, flowers arranged in panicles on the ends of branches, the flowers usually with four sepals and 11 to 14 stamens, and capsules usually with two wings.

== Description ==
Dodonaea polyandra is a spreading dioecious shrub or tree that typically grows to a height of up to 8 m (26 ft). Its leaves are simple, elliptic, 55–105 mm (2.2–4.1 in) long, 1.6–4.25 mm (0.063–0.167 in) long and glabrous on a petiole 3–10 mm (0.12–0.39 in) long. The flowers are arranged in panicles on the ends of branches, each flower on a pedicel 4.5–14 mm (0.18–0.55 in) long, usually with linear sepals, 2.5–3.0 mm (0.098–0.118 in) long that fall off as the flower develops, and 11 to 14 stamens. The ovary is glabrous. The fruit is a two-winged, broadly oblong capsule 16–28 mm (0.63–1.10 in) long and 15–30 mm (0.59–1.18 in) wide and glabrous with membranous wings 6–9 mm (0.24–0.35 in) wide.

== Taxonomy ==
Dodonaea polyandra was first formally described in 1945 by Elmer Drew Merrill and Lily May Perry the Journal of the Arnold Arboretum. The specific epithet (polyandra) means 'many-stamens'.

== Distribution and habitat ==
This species of Dodonaea grows on the edges of rainforest or in open woodland in sandy or gravelly soil on the north and east of Cape York Peninsula, in the White Mountains National Park and in the Western Province (Papua New Guinea) of New Guinea.

== Conservation status ==
Dodonaea polyandra is listed as of "least concern" under the Queensland Government Nature Conservation Act 1992.
