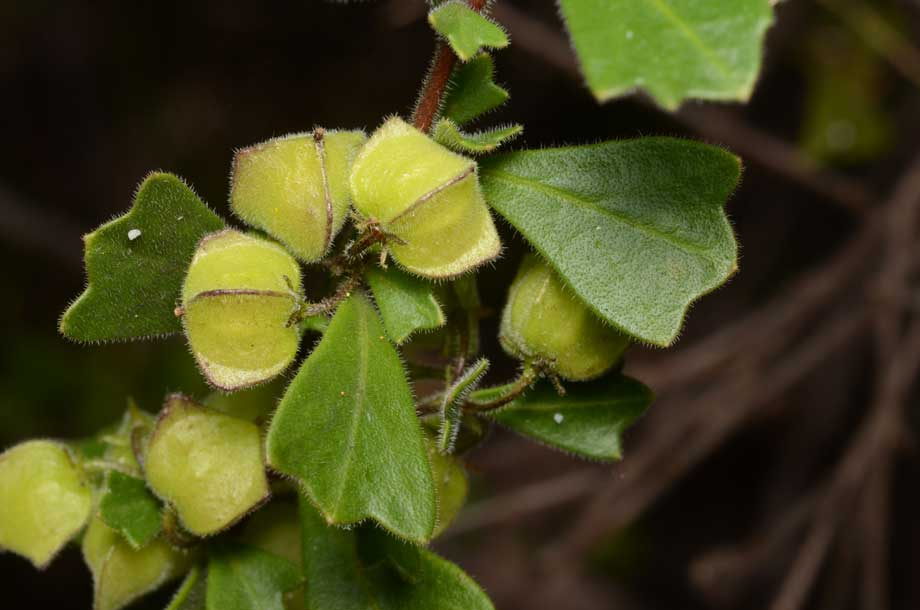
- In Expedition National Park

Scientific classification
- Kingdom: Plantae
- Clade: Tracheophytes
- Clade: Angiosperms
- Clade: Eudicots
- Clade: Rosids
- Order: Sapindales
- Family: Sapindaceae
- Genus: Dodonaea
- Species: D. triangularis

Binomial name
- Dodonaea triangularis Lindl.

= Dodonaea triangularis =

Species of plant

Dodonaea triangularis, commonly known as triangle-leaved hopbush, is a species of flowering plant in the family Sapindaceae and is endemic to eastern Australia. It is a dioecious shrub with simple, more or less sessile leaves with three teeth or lobes at the end, flowers in groups of three to six axillary cymes, each flower with four sepals, six to eight stamens, and three- or four-angled capsule with lobe-like appendages.

== Description ==
Dodonaea triangularis is a spreading, dioecious or rarely polygamodioecious shrub that typically grows to a height of up to 3 m (9.8 ft). Its leaves are simple, usually 12–35 mm (0.47–1.38 in) long and 6–30 mm (0.24–1.18 in) wide on a petiole 1–3 mm (0.039–0.118 in) long, usually egg-shaped or lance-shaped with the narrower end towards the base, and usually with three teeth or lobes on the end. The flowers are arranged in axils in cymes of 3 to 6, sometimes on the ends of branches, each flower on a pedicel 3.5–10 mm (0.14–0.39 in) long. The flowers usually have four lance-shaped sepals 1.2–3 mm (0.047–0.118 in) long and 6 to 8 stamens, and a ovary densely covered with soft hairs. The fruit is a three- or four-angled, more or less spherical or egg-shaped capsule, mostly 6–9 mm (0.24–0.35 in) long and 8.5–11.5 mm (0.33–0.45 in) wide, with leathery or crusty lobes 1–2 mm (0.039–0.079 in) wide.

== Taxonomy ==
Dodonaea triangularis was first formally described in 1848 by John Lindley in Thomas Mitchell's Journal of an Expedition into the Interior of Tropical Australia. The specific epithet (triangularis) means 'triangular'.

== Distribution and habitat ==
This species of Dodonaea occurs between the Townsville area of Queensland and far north-eastern New South Wales where it grows in forest or woodland in granitic and sandstone soils on the ranges. The is an apparent disjunct population in the Hunter region of New South Wales.

== Conservation status ==
Dodonaea triangularis is listed as of "least concern" under the Queensland Government Nature Conservation Act 1992.
