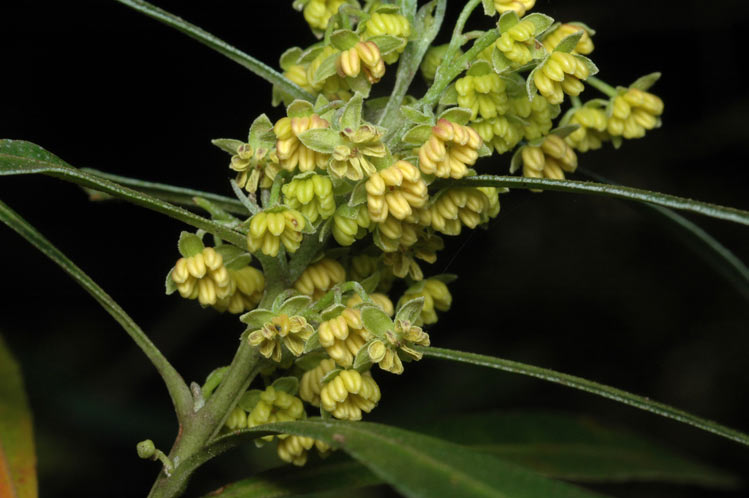
- In the Australian National Botanic Gardens

Scientific classification
- Kingdom: Plantae
- Clade: Tracheophytes
- Clade: Angiosperms
- Clade: Eudicots
- Clade: Rosids
- Order: Sapindales
- Family: Sapindaceae
- Genus: Dodonaea
- Species: D. truncatiales

Binomial name
- Dodonaea truncatiales F.Muell.

= Dodonaea truncatiales =

Species of shrub

Dodonaea truncatiales, commonly known as angular hop-bush, is a species of flowering plant in the family Sapindaceae and is endemic to south-eastern continental Australia. It is usually a dioecious shrub with simple, sessile, narrowly elliptic or linear leaves, flowers in cymes in leaf axils, each flower with four sepals, eight stamens, and a three- or four-winged capsule.

== Description ==
Dodonaea truncatiales is a dioecious or rarely polygamodioecious shrub that typically grows to a height of up to 3 m (9.8 ft). It has simple, sessile, narrowly elliptic, sometimes lance-shaped or linear leaves 55–100 mm (2.2–3.9 in) long, 5–13 mm (0.20–0.51 in) wide and glabrous. The flowers are arranged in axils in cymes on pedicles 3–8.5 mm (0.12–0.33 in) long, each flower with four lance-shaped to egg-shaped sepals but that fall off as the flower develops, eight stamens, and an ovary covered with soft hairs. Flowering occurs from late winter to spring, and the capsule is 5.5–8 mm (0.22–0.31 in) long and 17–25 mm (0.67–0.98 in) wide, with three or four membranous wings, mostly 7–10 mm (0.28–0.39 in) wide.

== Taxonomy ==
Dodonaea truncatiales was first formally described in 1861 by Ferdinand von Mueller in his Fragmenta Phytographiae Australiae.

== Distribution and habitat ==
Angular hop-bush grows in forest in sandstone, often near rivers, and occurs on the central and south coast and central tablelands of New South Wales and far north-eastern Victoria.
