= Dodonaea dodecandra =

Scientific classification
- Kingdom: Plantae
- Clade: Tracheophytes
- Clade: Angiosperms
- Clade: Eudicots
- Clade: Rosids
- Order: Sapindales
- Family: Sapindaceae
- Genus: Dodonaea
- Species: D. dodecandra

Binomial name
- Dodonaea dodecandra Benth.

Synonyms
- Distichostemon dodecandrus Domin

Species of shrub

Dodonaea dodecandra is a species of plant in the family Sapindaceae and is endemic to Queensland. It is a low-lying shrub with simple, egg-shaped leaves with the narrower end towards the base, flowers usually arranged singly or in open racemes, with ten to fifteen stamens, and triangular capsules with three triangular wings.

== Description ==
Dodonaea dodecandra is a low-lying shrub that typically grows to a height of up to 1 m (3 ft 3 in) and has rigid branches. Its leaves are simple, egg-shaped with the narrower end towards the base, 10–42 mm (0.39–1.65 in) long and 5–17 mm (0.20–0.67 in) wide on a petiole 1–5 mm (0.039–0.197 in) long. The flowers are usually borne singly or in racemes in leaf axils, each flower on a pedicel 6–12 mm (0.24–0.47 in) long. Each flower has six to ten linear, egg-shaped or elliptic sepals, 2–5 mm (0.079–0.197 in) long and ten to fifteen stamens, the style 5–12 mm (0.20–0.47 in) long. The fruit is a three-winged, triangular or round capsule 8–16 mm (0.31–0.63 in) long and up to 22 mm (0.87 in) wide, the wings 3–8 mm (0.12–0.31 in) long and 4–6 mm (0.16–0.24 in) wide.

== Taxonomy and naming ==
This species was first formally described in 1927 by Karel Domin, who gave it the name Distichostemon dodecandrus in Bibliotheca Botanica from specimens he collected near Pentland in 1910. In 2010, Mark Harrington transferred the species to Dodonaea as D. dodecandra in Australian Systematic Botany. The specific epithet (dodecandra) means 'twelve-stamened'.

== Distribution and habitat ==
Dodonaea dodecandra grows in sandy or pebbly soils on hillsides between Mareeba and Torrens Creek in Queensland.

== Conservation status ==
Dodonaea dodecandra is listed as of "least concern" under the Queensland Government Nature Conservation Act 1992.
