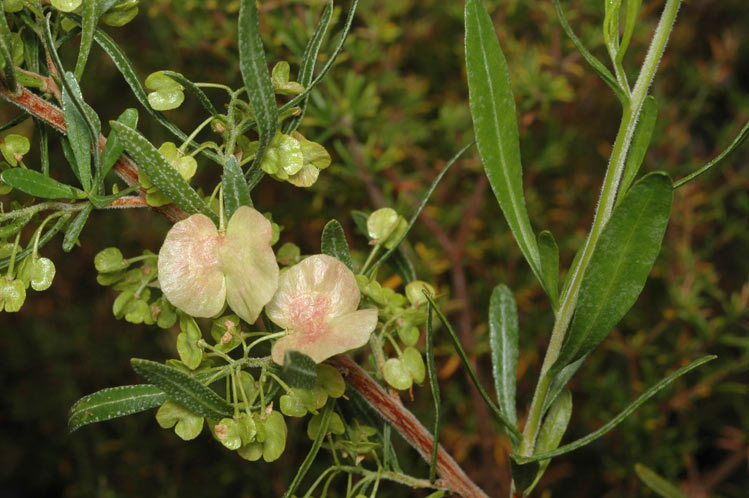
- In the ANBG

Conservation status
- Priority Four — Rare Taxa (DEC)

Scientific classification
- Kingdom: Plantae
- Clade: Tracheophytes
- Clade: Angiosperms
- Clade: Eudicots
- Clade: Rosids
- Order: Sapindales
- Family: Sapindaceae
- Genus: Dodonaea
- Species: D. hackettiana

Binomial name
- Dodonaea hackettiana W.Fitzg.

= Dodonaea hackettiana =

Species of shrub

Dodonaea hackettiana, commonly known as Hackett's hopbush, is a species of plant in the family Sapindaceae and is endemic to a restricted part in the south-west of Western Australia. It is an erect dioecious shrub or tree with simple, narrowly elliptic leaves, flowers arranged in panicles on the ends of branches, male flowers with usually six stamens, and elliptic, 3-winged capsules.

== Description ==
Dodonaea hackettiana is an erect, dioecious shrub or tree that typically grows to a height of up to 4.5 m (15 ft). Its leaves are simple, sessile, narrowly elliptic, 30–55 mm (1.2–2.2 in) long and 4–9 mm (0.16–0.35 in) wide with a few soft hairs on the midrib and edges. The flowers are borne in panicles on the ends of branches, each flower on a pedicel 1.8–4.5 mm (0.071–0.177 in) long. The three sepals are egg-shaped, 1.6–2.1 mm (0.063–0.083 in) long and fall off as the flower matures. Male flowers usually have six stamens, and female flowers have an ovary with soft hairs. The fruit is an elliptic capsule 9.5–13 mm (0.37–0.51 in) long and 12.5–7 mm (0.49–0.28 in) wide with three membranous wings 3.5–5.5 mm (0.14–0.22 in) wide.

== Taxonomy and naming ==
Dodonaea hackettiana was first formally described in 1905 by William Vincent Fitzgerald in the Journal of the West Australian Natural History Society from specimens collected in 1904. The specific epithet (hackettiana) honours J.W. Hackett, the chairman of the Kings Park Board.

== Distribution and habitat ==
This species of Dodonaea grows in limestone soil in open forest near Perth in the Swan Coastal Plain bioregion of coastal south-western Western Australia.

== Conservation status ==
Dodonaea hackettiana is listed as "Priority Four" by the Government of Western Australia Department of Biodiversity, Conservation and Attractions, meaning that is rare or near threatened.
