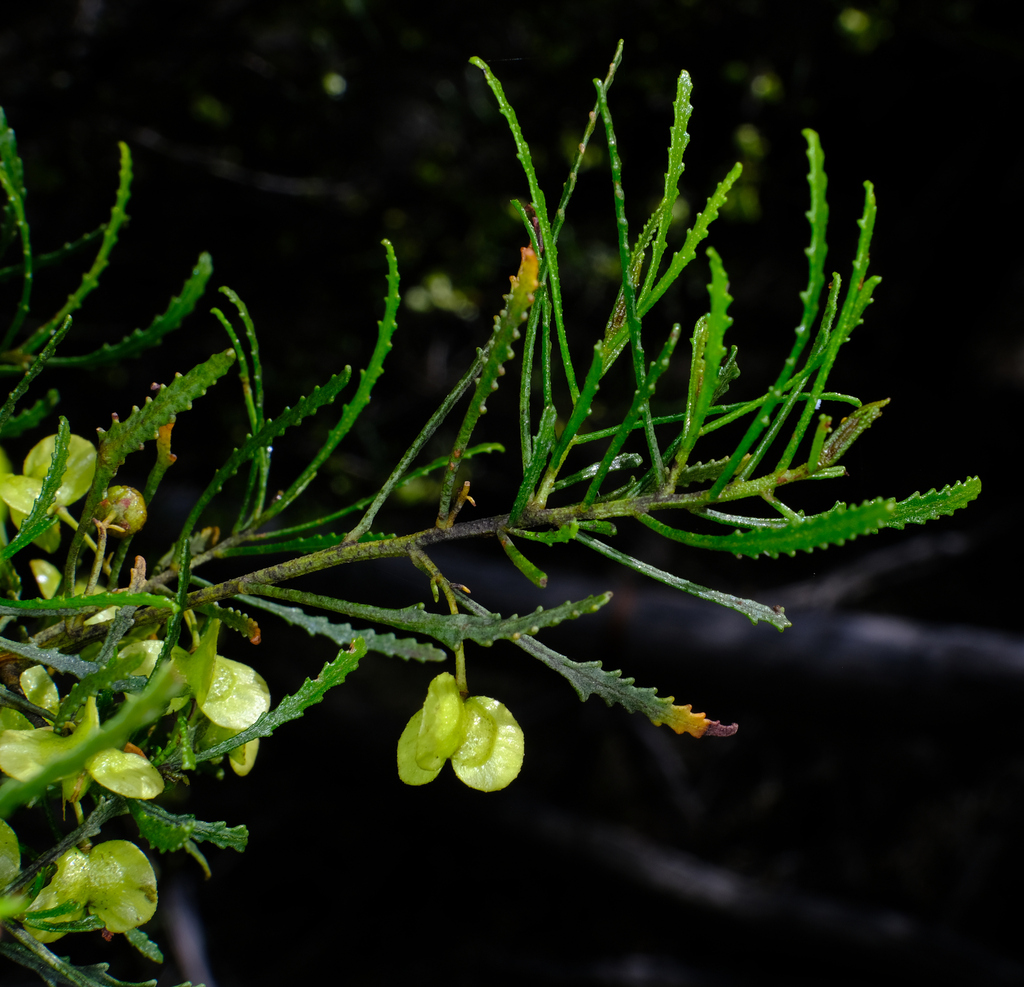
- Near Kukerin

Scientific classification
- Kingdom: Plantae
- Clade: Tracheophytes
- Clade: Angiosperms
- Clade: Eudicots
- Clade: Rosids
- Order: Sapindales
- Family: Sapindaceae
- Genus: Dodonaea
- Species: D. ptarmicifolia

Binomial name
- Dodonaea ptarmicifolia Turcz.

= Dodonaea ptarmicifolia =

Species of plant

Dodonaea ptarmicifolia is a species of flowering plant in the family Sapindaceae and is endemic to the south-west of Western Australia. It is an erect, dioecious shrub with simple, sessile linear leaves, flowers in cymes of 3 or four in leaf axils, the flowers usually with three sepals and six stamens, and capsules with three membranous wings.

== Description ==
Dodonaea ptarmicifolia is an erect, dioecious shrub that typically grows to a height of up to 4 m (13 ft). Its leaves are simple, sessile usually linear, sometimes oblong or lance-shaped,20–53 mm (0.79–2.09 in) long, 10–30 mm (0.39–1.18 in) wide on a petiole 3–8 mm (0.12–0.31 in) long and glabrous, with serrations 1.0–1.5 mm (0.039–0.059 in) long in the lower third of the leaf. The flowers are arranged cymes of three or four in leaf axils, each flower on a pedicel 3.5–7.5 mm (0.14–0.30 in) long, with three or four egg-shaped sepals, 1.5–2.0 mm (0.059–0.079 in) long but that fall off as the flowers develop, and six, sometimes up to eight stamens. The ovary is hairy and the fruit is a three-winged capsule, 6–10.5 mm (0.24–0.41 in) long and 10–16 mm (0.39–0.63 in) wide, the wing 3–5 mm (0.12–0.20 in) wide and membranous.

== Taxonomy ==
Dodonaea ptarmicifolia was first formally described in 1852 by Nikolai Turczaninow in theBulletin de la Société Impériale des Naturalistes de Moscou. The specific epithet (ptarmicifolia) means 'Ptarmica-leaved'. (The genus Ptarmica is now a synonym of Achillea.

== Distribution and habitat ==
This species of Dodonaea grows in sandy or granite loam in mallee scrub between Tammin and Peak Charles National Park in the Avon Wheatbelt, Coolgardie, Esperance Plains, and Mallee bioregions of south-western Western Australia.

== Conservation status ==
Dodonaea ptarmicifolia is listed as "not threatened" by the Government of Western Australia Department of Biodiversity, Conservation and Attractions.
