= Dodonaea trifida =

Scientific classification
- Kingdom: Plantae
- Clade: Tracheophytes
- Clade: Angiosperms
- Clade: Eudicots
- Clade: Rosids
- Order: Sapindales
- Family: Sapindaceae
- Genus: Dodonaea
- Species: D. trifida

Binomial name
- Dodonaea trifida J.G.West

Synonyms
- Dodonaea humifusa var. hirtella Benth.

Species of plant

Dodonaea trifida is a species of flowering plant in the family Sapindaceae and is endemic to near-coastal areas of southern Western Australia. It is an erect, dioecious shrub with simple, sessile leaves, flowers in cymes of three to five on the ends of branches, the flowers with four to six sepals, and three-angled capsules with lobe-like appendages.

== Description ==
Dodonaea trifida is an erect, dioecious shrub that typically grows to a height of up to 1 m (3 ft 3 in). Its leaves are simple, sessile, egg-shaped tor triangular with the narrower end towards the base, 7–12 mm (0.28–0.47 in) long, 4–10 mm (0.16–0.39 in) wide with three teeth or lobes on the end. The flowers are arranged in cymes of three to five on the ends of branches, each flower on a pedicel 1–2 mm (0.039–0.079 in) long, with four to six linear to lance-shaped sepals, 1.6–4.3 mm (0.063–0.169 in) long. There are eight stamens and the ovary is densely covered with fine, soft hair. The fruit is a three-angled, more or less spherical or egg-shaped capsule, 7–10 mm (0.28–0.39 in) long and 7.5–10 mm (0.30–0.39 in) wide, with lobe-like, leathery appendages 1–2.5 mm (0.039–0.098 in) wide.

== Taxonomy ==
Dodonaea trifida was first formally described in 1875 by Ferdinand von Mueller in his Fragmenta Phytographiae Australiae. The specific epithet (trifida) means 'three-forked', referring to the leaves.

== Distribution and habitat ==
This species of Dodonaea grows in sandy or gravelly soils in coastal scrub or low forest in near-coastal areas between Albany and Ravensthorpe Esperance Plains and Jarrah Forest bioregions of southern Western Australia.

== Conservation status ==
Dodonaea trifida is listed as "not threatened" by the Government of Western Australia Department of Biodiversity, Conservation and Attractions.
