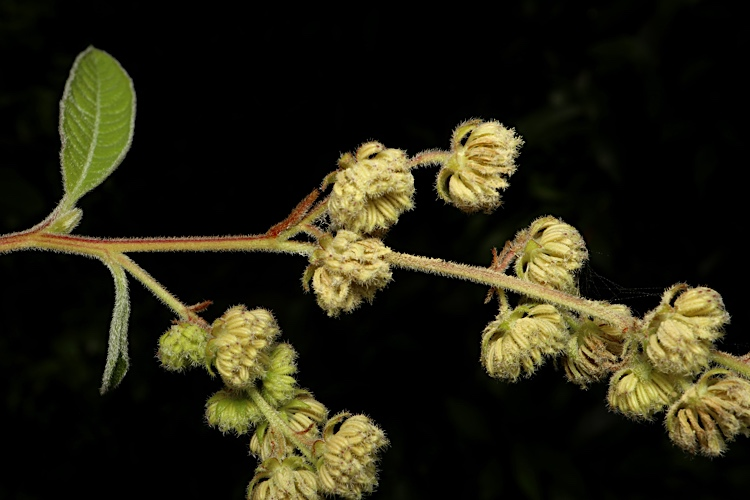
- In the ANBG

Scientific classification
- Kingdom: Plantae
- Clade: Tracheophytes
- Clade: Angiosperms
- Clade: Eudicots
- Clade: Rosids
- Order: Sapindales
- Family: Sapindaceae
- Genus: Dodonaea
- Species: D. hispidula

Binomial name
- Dodonaea hispidula Endl.

Synonyms
- List: ? Distichostemon filamentosa M.G.Harr. orth. var.; ? Distichostemon filamentosus S.Moore; Distichostemon hispidulum Baill. orth. var.; Distichostemon hispidulus (Endl.) Baill.; Dodonaea filamentosa (S.Moore) M.G.Harr.

= Dodonaea hispidula =

Species of flowering plant

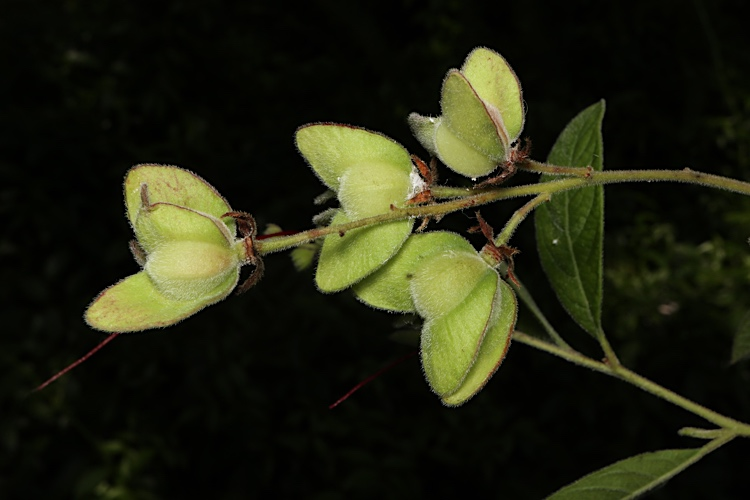
Fruit

Dodonaea hispidula is a species of flowering plant in the family Sapindaceae and is native to tropical northern Australia. It is a shrub with simple, usually clustered, narrowly elliptic or egg-shaped leaves with the narrower end towards the base, flowers arranged singly, in racemes or panicles, and oblong or elliptic capsules with three or four locules.

== Description ==
Dodonaea hispidula is a shrub that typically grows to a height of up to 2 m (6 ft 7 in). Its leaves are simple, usually clustered, narrowly elliptic or egg-shaped with the narrower end towards the base, 15–90 mm (0.59–3.54 in) long and 8–34 mm (0.31–1.34 in) wide, on a petiole 2–14 mm (0.079–0.551 in) long. The flowers are arranged singly or in racemes or panicles on the ends of branches or in leaf axils, each flower on a pedicel 2–22 mm (0.079–0.866 in) long. There are five to ten elliptic sepals and 30 to 74 stamens, the ovary oval or heart-shaped, covered with soft hairs with a style 5–25 mm (0.20–0.98 in) long. The fruit is an oval to elliptic capsule with 3 or 4 locules and wings 2–7 mm (0.079–0.276 in) long and 2–14 mm (0.079–0.551 in) wide.

== Taxonomy ==
Dodonaea hispidula was first formally described in 1835 by Stephan Endlicher in his Atakta Botanika.

The names of three subspecies of D. hispidula are accepted by the Australian Plant Census:

- Dodonaea hispidula var. arida (S.T.Reynolds) M.G.Harr. is a shrub up to 1 m (3 ft 3 in) high with often clustered leaves 15–40 mm (0.59–1.57 in) long on a petiole 2–6 mm (0.079–0.236 in) long, six or seven sepals about 4 mm (0.16 in) long, 31 to 74 stamens about 1 mm (0.039 in) long and the fruit is 8–10 mm (0.31–0.39 in) long and 6–10 mm (0.24–0.39 in) wide with erect wings 2–7 mm (0.079–0.276 in) long and 2–4 mm (0.079–0.157 in) wide.
- Dodonaea hispidula Endl. var. hispidula is a shrub up to 1.5 m (4 ft 11 in) high with often clustered leaves 30–70 mm (1.2–2.8 in) long on a petiole 3–9 mm (0.12–0.35 in) long, five or ten sepals 2.5–3.5 mm (0.098–0.138 in) long, 33 to 74 stamens 2.0–2.5 mm (0.079–0.098 in) long and the fruit is 8–12 mm (0.31–0.47 in) long and 15–18 mm (0.59–0.71 in) wide with triangular wings up to 8 mm (0.31 in) wide.
- Dodonaea hispidula var. phylloptera (F.Muell.) M.G.Harr. is a shrub up to 2 m (6 ft 7 in) high, the leaves not clustered 40–90 mm (1.6–3.5 in) long on a petiole 4–14 mm (0.16–0.55 in) long, six to eight sepals 3–6 mm (0.12–0.24 in) long, 30 to 52 stamens and the fruit is 8–10 mm (0.31–0.39 in) long and 12–28 mm (0.47–1.10 in) wide with wings up to 14 mm (0.55 in) wide.

== Distribution and habitat ==
This species of Dodonaea is found in tropical Western Australia, the Northern Territory and Queensland.

- Subspecies arida grows on sandy plains among sandstone rocks in the Kimberley region of Western Australia and in the north of the Northern Territory.
- Subspecies hispidula grows in red soil on plains in the north of Northern Territory and northern Queensland.
- Subspecies phylloptera grows among sandstone rockes and is common in the Kimberley region and in the north-west of the Northern Territory.

== Conservation status ==
Dodonaea hispidula and all 3 subspecies are listed as "not threatened" by the Government of Western Australia Department of Biodiversity, Conservation and Attractions, of "least concern" under the Queensland Government Nature Conservation Act 1992 and the Northern Territory Government Territory Parks and Wildlife Conservation Act.
