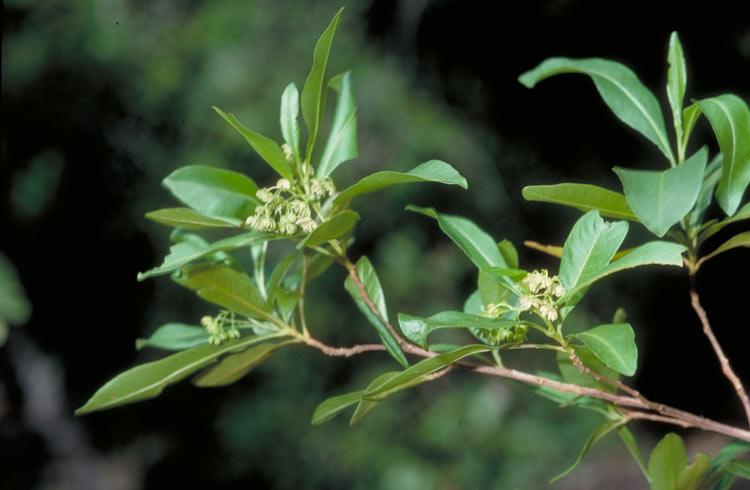

Scientific classification
- Kingdom: Plantae
- Clade: Tracheophytes
- Clade: Angiosperms
- Clade: Eudicots
- Clade: Rosids
- Order: Sapindales
- Family: Sapindaceae
- Genus: Dodonaea
- Species: D. platyptera

Binomial name
- Dodonaea platyptera F.Muell.

= Dodonaea platyptera =

Species of plant

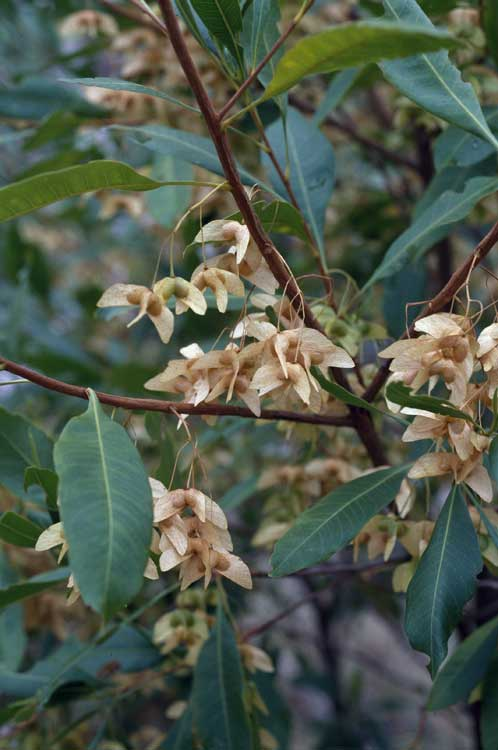
Fruit

Dodonaea platyptera is a species of plant in the family Sapindaceae and is endemic to northern Australia. It is an erect dioecious shrub or small tree with hairy branches, simple, narrowly elliptic to elliptic leaves with a prominent midrib, flowers arranged in panicles or cymes, the flowers with four sepals and usually eight stamens, and capsules with three or four leathery wings.

== Description ==
Dodonaea platyptera is a spreading, usually dioecious shrub or tree that typically grows to a height of up to 5 m (16 ft). Its leaves are simple, usually clustered near the ends of branches, narrowly elliptic to elliptic, petiolate, 39–97 mm (1.5–3.8 in) long and 9–32 mm (0.35–1.26 in) wide with a prominent mid-rib. The flowers are arranged in panicles or cymes, each flower on a pedicel usually 5.5–9 mm (0.22–0.35 in) long, with four narrowly oblong to narrowly egg-shaped to elliptic sepals, 1.5–2.5 mm (0.059–0.098 in) long but that fall off as the flowers develop, and usually eight stamens. The ovary is hairy and the fruit is a three- or four-winged capsule, 7–11 mm (0.28–0.43 in) long and 21–26 mm (0.83–1.02 in) wide with leathery wings 7–11 mm (0.28–0.43 in) wide.

== Taxonomy ==
Dodonaea platyptera was first formally described in 1857 by Ferdinand von Mueller in Hooker's Journal of Botany and Kew Garden Miscellany. The specific epithet (platyptera) means 'broad-winged'.

== Distribution and habitat ==
This species of Dodonaea grows in coastal areas, often near sand dunes or on the edges of rainforest, and sometimes further inland in open forest or in dune thickets in sandy soil in the Kimberley region of Western Australia, the northern parts of the Northern Territory and in northern Queensland in the north of the Northern Territory and north-eastern Queensland.

== Conservation status ==
Dodonaea physocarpa is listed as "not threatened" by the Government of Western Australia Department of Biodiversity, Conservation and Attractions and as of "least concern" under the Territory Parks and Wildlife Conservation Act and the Queensland Government Nature Conservation Act 1992.
