= Dodonaea malvacea =

Scientific classification
- Kingdom: Plantae
- Clade: Tracheophytes
- Clade: Angiosperms
- Clade: Eudicots
- Clade: Rosids
- Order: Sapindales
- Family: Sapindaceae
- Genus: Dodonaea
- Species: D. malvacea

Binomial name
- Dodonaea malvacea (Domin) & M.G.Harr.

Synonyms
- Distichostemon malvaceus Domin; Distichostemon phyllopterus auct. non F.Muell.: Bentham, G.; Distichostemon phyllopterus auct. non F.Muell.: Banks, J. & Solander, D.C.

Species of shrub

Dodonaea malvacea is a species of plant in the family Sapindaceae and is endemic to a Queensland. It is a shrub with oblong, elliptic or egg-shaped leaves with the narrower end towards the base, flowers arranged singly or in small racemes with linear or egg-shaped sepals and eight to ten stamens, and four to eight narrowly winged capsules.

== Description ==
Dodonaea malvacea is a shrub that typically grows to a height of up to 1.5 m (4 ft 11 in). Its leaves are oblong, elliptic or egg-shaped with the narrower end towards the base, 55–90 mm (2.2–3.5 in) long and 10–23 mm (0.39–0.91 in) wide, on a petiole 1–2 mm (0.039–0.079 in) long. The flowers are arranged singly or in small open racemes on the ends of branches, each flower on a pedicel up to 4 mm (0.16 in) long. The flowers have five to seven linear to egg-shaped sepals, 3.5–5 mm (0.14–0.20 in) long and eight to ten stamens. The ovary is covered with soft hairs and has six to eight lobes. The fruit is a four to eight lobed, elliptic capsule 18–22 mm (0.71–0.87 in) long and wide with four to eight narrow wings.

== Taxonomy ==
This species was first formally described in 1927 by Karel Domin, who gave it the name Distichostemon malvaceus in Bibliotheca Botanica, from specimens collected on the Cape York Peninsula by William Hann. In 2010, M.G. Harrington transferred the species to Dodonaea as D. malvacea.

== Distribution and habitat ==
This species of Dodonaea grows in open forest on sandy and gravelly ridges on Cape York Peninsula, between Heathlands Regional Park north of Shelburne, and Mareeba.

== Conservation status ==
Dodonaea malvacea is listed as of "least concern" under the Queensland Government Nature Conservation Act 1992.
