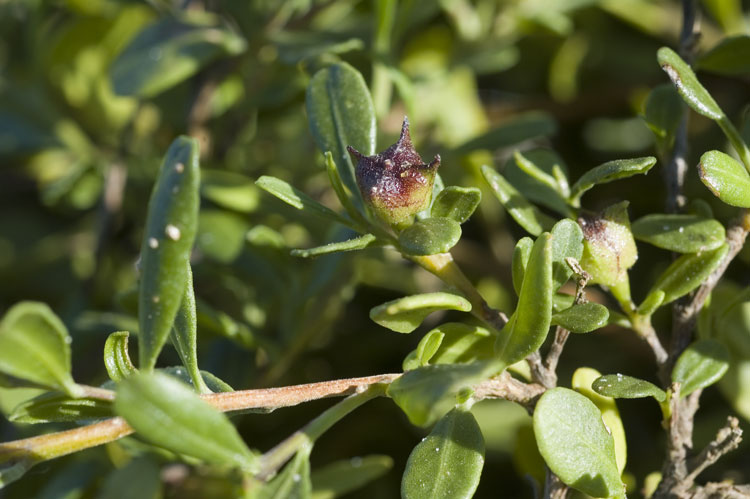
- In Cape Arid National Park

Scientific classification
- Kingdom: Plantae
- Clade: Tracheophytes
- Clade: Angiosperms
- Clade: Eudicots
- Clade: Rosids
- Order: Sapindales
- Family: Sapindaceae
- Genus: Dodonaea
- Species: D. ceratocarpa

Binomial name
- Dodonaea ceratocarpa Endl.

Synonyms
- Dodonaea pterocaulis Miq.; Dodonaea oblongifolia auct. non Link

= Dodonaea ceratocarpa =

Species of shrub

Dodonaea ceratocarpa is a species of plant in the family Sapindaceae and is endemic to the south-west of Western Australia. It is a spreading to erect shrub with simple, sessile, lance-shaped to egg-shaped leaves with the narrower end towards the base, flowers arranged in three of four cymes on the ends of branches, each flowers with eight stamens, and four-angled capsules with horn-like appendages.

== Description ==
Dodonaea ceratocarpa is a dioecious, spreading shrub that typically grows to a height of up to 2.5 m (8 ft 2 in). Its leaves are sessile, simple, lance-shaped to egg-shaped with the narrower end towards the base, usually 14–30 mm (0.55–1.18 in) long, 3–10 mm (0.12–0.39 in) wide and glabrous, with the end rolled under. The flowers borne in three or four cymes on the ends of branches, with four egg-shaped sepals 2.0–3.5 mm (0.079–0.138 in) long, but that fall off as the flowers open. Each flower has eight stamens and the ovary has a few sparse hairs. Flowering mainly occurs from May to October and the fruit is usually a four-angled, spherical capsule 4.5–8 mm (0.18–0.31 in) long and 5–8.5 mm (0.20–0.33 in) wide, including horn-like appendages 1–3 mm (0.039–0.118 in) wide.

== Taxonomy and naming ==
Dodonaea ceratocarpa was first formally described in 1837 by Stephan Endlicher in Enumeratio plantarum quas in Novae Hollandiae ora austro-occidentali ad fluvium Cygnorum et in sinu Regis Georgii collegit Carolus Liber Baro de Hügel. The specific epithet (ceratocarpa) means 'horn-fruited'.

== Distribution and habitat ==
This species of Dodonaea grows in sandy soils on granite outcrops, coastal headlands and cliffs, between Perth and Israelite Bay, in the Avon Wheatbelt, Esperance Plains, Geraldton Sandplains, Jarrah Forest, Mallee, Swan Coastal Plain and Warren bioregions of south-western Western Australia.

== Conservation status ==
Dodonaea ceratocarpa is listed as "not threatened" by the Government of Western Australia Department of Biodiversity, Conservation and Attractions.
