= Dodonaea barklyana =

Scientific classification
- Kingdom: Plantae
- Clade: Tracheophytes
- Clade: Angiosperms
- Clade: Eudicots
- Clade: Rosids
- Order: Sapindales
- Family: Sapindaceae
- Genus: Dodonaea
- Species: D. barklyana

Binomial name
- Dodonaea barklyana (S.T.Reynolds) M.G.Harr.

Synonyms
- Distichostemon barklyana M.G.Harr. orth. var.; Distichostemon barklyanus S.T.Reynolds

Species of flowering plant

Dodonaea barklyana is a species of plant in the family Sapindaceae and is endemic to northern Australia. It is a shrub with elliptic or oblong, sometimes wavy leaves, flowers arranged in small racemes, and oval to more or less spherical capsules with three or four minute, knob-like triangular wings.

== Description ==
Dodonaea barklyana is a shrub that typically grows to a height of up to 1 m (3 ft 3 in). Its leaves are oblong or elliptic, 25–60 mm (0.98–2.36 in) long and 10–22 mm (0.39–0.87 in) wide on a petiole 3–7 mm (0.12–0.28 in) long, often clustered and sometimes wavy. The flowers are usually borne in small racemes on the ends of branches, each flower on a pedicel 2–7 mm (0.079–0.276 in) long, with five to seven pointed elliptic sepals 3–5 mm (0.12–0.20 in) long and 10 to 22 stamens. The fruit is an oval or more or less spherical capsule, 8–10 mm (0.31–0.39 in) long and 6–10 mm (0.24–0.39 in) wide, with three or four knob-like, triangular wings 0.5–1 mm (0.020–0.039 in) long and 0.5–3 mm (0.020–0.118 in) wide.

== Taxonomy ==
This species was first formally described in 1984 by Sally T. Reynolds who gave it the name Distichostemon barklyanus in the journal Austrobaileya, based on specimens collected 48 km (30 mi) south of Elliott in 1969. In 2010, M.G. Harrington transferred the species to Dodonaea as D. barklyana in Australian Systematic Botany. The specific epithet (barklyana) refers to the Barkly Tableland, where the species is common.

== Distribution and habitat ==
This species of Dodonaea is common on the Barkly Tableland in the Northern Territory and Queensland, where it grows on rocky hillsides and outcrops.

== Conservation status ==
Dodonaea barklyana is listed as of "least concern" under the Northern Territory Government Territory Parks and Wildlife Conservation Act and the Queensland Government Nature Conservation Act 1992.
