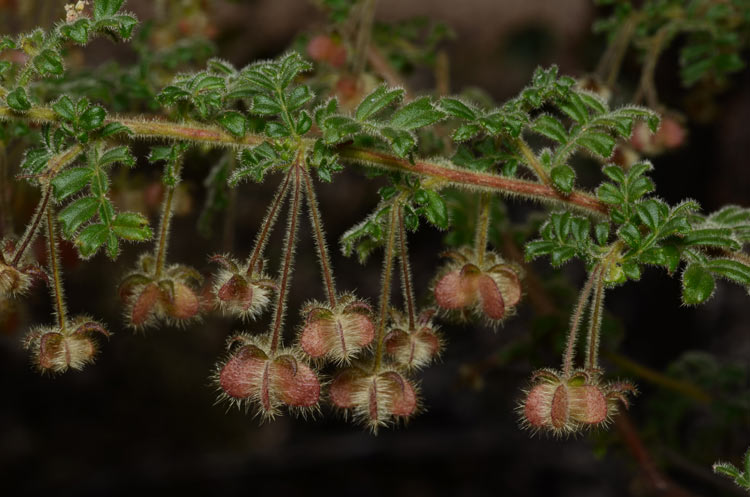
- Near Expedition National Park

Scientific classification
- Kingdom: Plantae
- Clade: Embryophytes
- Clade: Tracheophytes
- Clade: Spermatophytes
- Clade: Angiosperms
- Clade: Eudicots
- Clade: Rosids
- Order: Sapindales
- Family: Sapindaceae
- Genus: Dodonaea
- Species: D. vestita

Binomial name
- Dodonaea vestita Hook.

= Dodonaea vestita =

Species of plant

Dodonaea vestita is a species of flowering plant in the family Sapindaceae and is endemic to Queensland, Australia. It is a dioecious shrub with imparipinnate leaves with 8 to 14 side leaflets, often with 2 or 3 teeth on the ends, flowers in groups of two to four in axillary cymes, each flower usually with four sepals, and capsules with four leathery wings.

== Description ==
Dodonaea vestita is a dioecious shrub that typically grows to a height of up to 1.5 m (4 ft 11 in). Its leaves are imparipinnate 8–22 mm (0.31–0.87 in) long on a petiole 1.5–4.5 mm (0.059–0.177 in) long, with 8 to 14 egg-shaped to oblong side leaflets, mostly 3.5–9 mm (0.14–0.35 in) long, 2–5 mm (0.079–0.197 in) wide with the edges turned down and 2 or 3 teeth on the end and covered with mostly golden yellow hairs. The flowers are arranged in axils in cymes or on the ends of branches with two to four flowers, each flower on a pedicel 7.5–13 mm (0.30–0.51 in) long. The flowers have four (rarely up to six) egg-shaped sepals 3–5 mm (0.12–0.20 in) long that sometimes fall off as the flowers open, and eight to twelve stamens and a hairy ovary. The fruit is a hairy, four- or five-winged, egg-shaped to elliptic capsule, mostly 8.5–15 mm (0.33–0.59 in) long and 16–24 mm (0.63–0.94 in) wide, the wings leathery and 5–7 mm (0.20–0.28 in) wide with golden-yellow hairs.

== Taxonomy ==
Dodonaea vestita was first formally described in 1848 by William Jackson Hooker in Thomas Mitchell's Journal of an Expedition into the Interior of Tropical Australia. The specific epithet (vestita) means 'covered' or 'clothed'.

== Distribution and habitat ==
This species of Dodonaea occurs in Queensland on the eastern edge of the Great Dividing Range from west of Townsville to Chinchilla in the Darling Downs. It usually grows in shallow, rocky soil on sandstone slopes in open forest.

== Conservation status ==
Dodonaea vestita is listed as of "least concern" under the Queensland Government Nature Conservation Act 1992.
