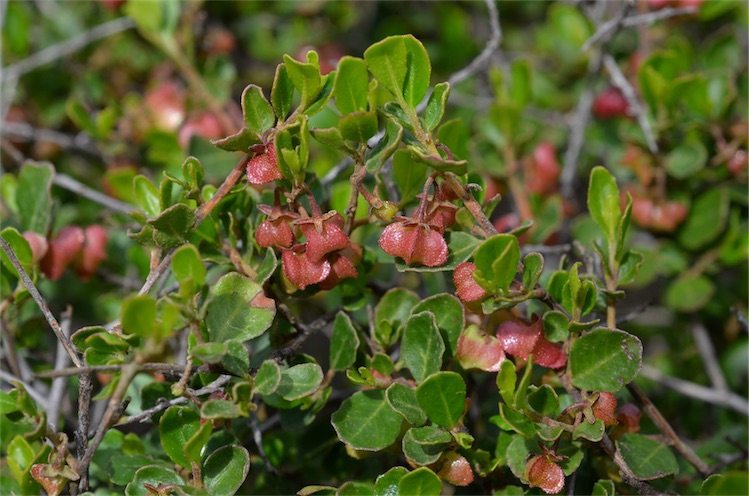
- In Cape Blanche Conservation Park

Scientific classification
- Kingdom: Plantae
- Clade: Tracheophytes
- Clade: Angiosperms
- Clade: Eudicots
- Clade: Rosids
- Order: Sapindales
- Family: Sapindaceae
- Genus: Dodonaea
- Species: D. baueri

Binomial name
- Dodonaea baueri Endl.

Synonyms
- Dodonaea deflexa F.Muell.

= Dodonaea baueri =

Species of plant

Dodonaea baueri, commonly known as crinkled hop-bush, is a species of flowering plant in the family Sapindaceae and is endemic to South Australia. It is a dioecious, spreading, sometimes prostrate shrub with simple leaves, single or paired flowers and capsules usually with four wings.

== Description ==
Dodonaea baueri is a dioecious, spreading or sometimes prostrate shrub that typically grows to a height of up to 1 m (3 ft 3 in). Its leaves are simple, broadly oblong to round, 5–18 mm (0.20–0.71 in) long and 3–10 mm (0.12–0.39 in) wide on a petiole 0.5–1.5 mm (0.020–0.059 in) long. The flowers are borne singly, rarely in pairs on a pedicel 2.0–3.2 mm (0.079–0.126 in) long, usually with four egg-shaped sepals 1.6–2.8 mm (0.063–0.110 in) long, eight stamens and a glabrous ovary. The fruit is usually a four-angled capsule, 4–5 mm (0.16–0.20 in) long, 5.5–10 mm (0.22–0.39 in) wide.

== Taxonomy and naming ==
Dodonaea baueri was first formally described in 1837 by Stephan Endlicher in the Enumeratio plantarum quas in Novae Hollandiae ora austro-occidentali ad fluvium Cygnorum et in sinu Regis Georgii collegit Carolus Liber Baro de Hügel from specimens collected on Salt Island by Ferdinand Bauer.

== Distribution and habitat ==
This species of Dodonaea grows in mallee scrub as an understorey shrub, on rocky hillsides and exposed places on mountain ridges in sandy loam.
