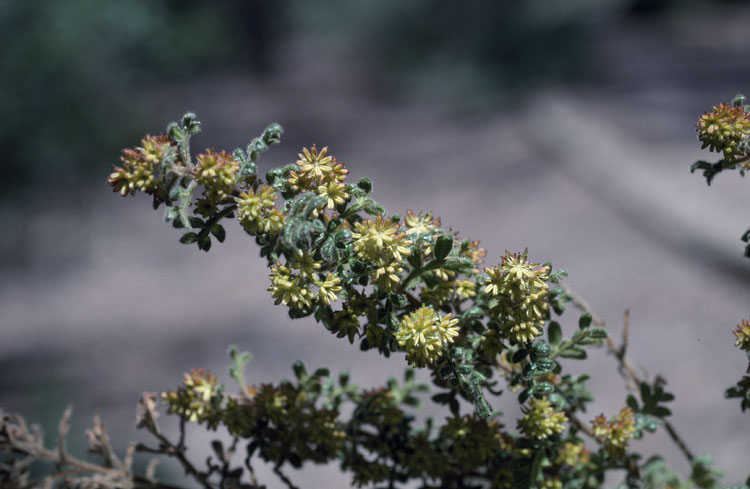
- In the Australian National Botanic Gardens

Scientific classification
- Kingdom: Plantae
- Clade: Tracheophytes
- Clade: Angiosperms
- Clade: Eudicots
- Clade: Rosids
- Order: Sapindales
- Family: Sapindaceae
- Genus: Dodonaea
- Species: D. pinnata

Binomial name
- Dodonaea pinnata Sm.

= Dodonaea pinnata =

Species of plant

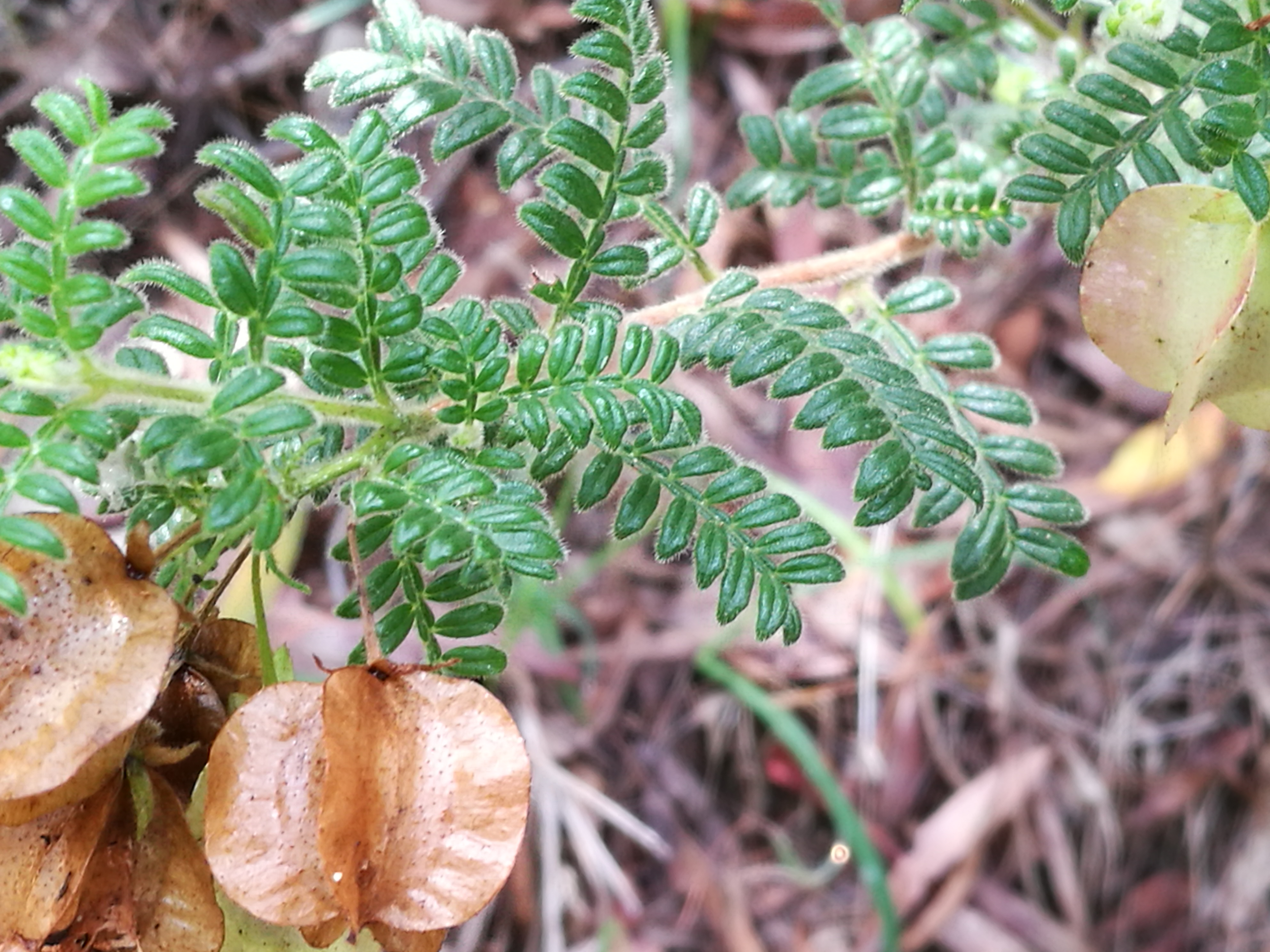
Leaves and fruit

Dodonaea pinnata, commonly known as pinnate hop bush, is a species of plant in the family Sapindaceae and is endemic to the Sydney region of New South Wales. It is a spreading, dioecious shrub with imparipinnate leaves with mostly 10 to 16 leaflets, flowers arranged singly with 4 or 5 sepals and 8 to 10 stamens, and 4-winged capsules with leathery wings.

== Description ==
Dodonaea pinnata is a spreading, dioecious shrub that typically grows to a height of up to 1.5 m (4 ft 11 in). Its leaves are imparipinnate, 14–38 mm (0.55–1.50 in) long on a petiole 4.0–5.5 mm (0.16–0.22 in) long. There are usually ten to sixteen densely hairy, narrowly egg-shaped leaflets, sometimes with the narrower end towards the base, the edges rolled under. The flowers are arranged singly on a pedicel 3.5–3.6 mm (0.14–0.14 in) long, with four or five egg-shaped sepals, 1.6–4.5 mm (0.063–0.177 in) long and eight to ten stamens. The ovary is hairy and the fruit is a four-winged capsule, 14–21 mm (0.55–0.83 in) long and 15.5–18 mm (0.61–0.71 in) wide with leathery wings 3.5–6 mm (0.14–0.24 in) wide.

== Taxonomy ==
Dodonaea pinnata was first formally described in 1809 by James Edward Smith in The Cyclopaedia. The specific epithet (pinnata) means 'pinnate', referring to the leaves.

== Distribution and habitat ==
This species of Dodonaea is restricted to the Hawkesbury and Nepean river systems near Sydney, where it grows in forest on soils derived from sandstone.
