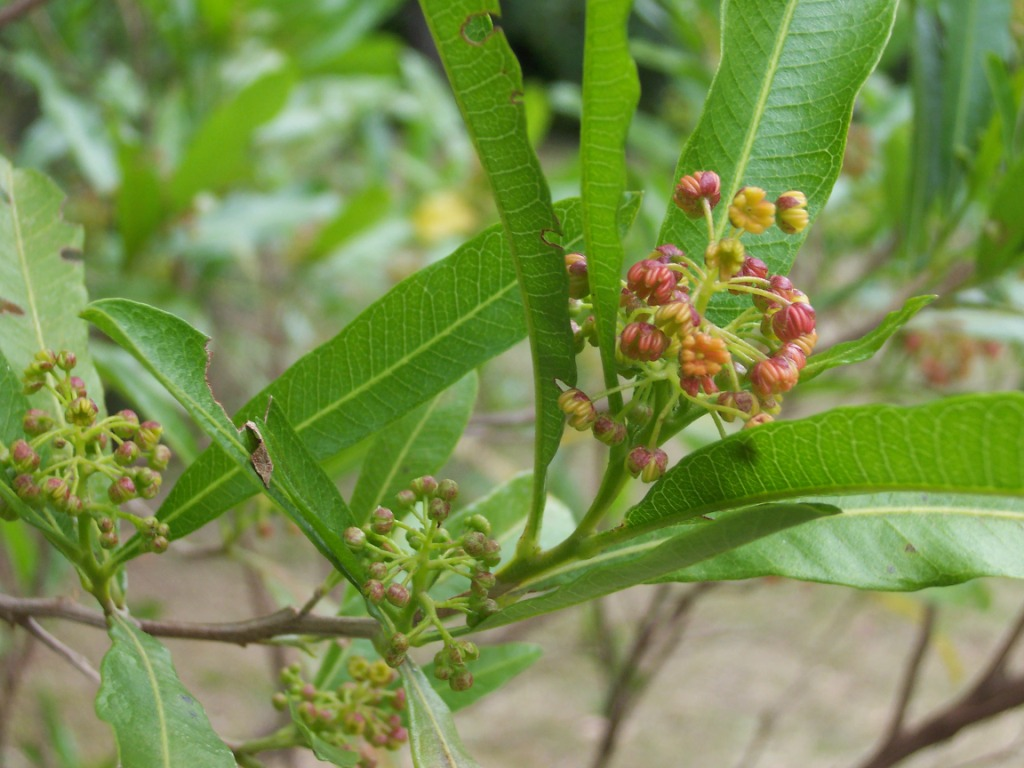
- Dodonaea viscosa foliage and flowers

Scientific classification
- Kingdom: Plantae
- Clade: Tracheophytes
- Clade: Angiosperms
- Clade: Eudicots
- Clade: Rosids
- Order: Sapindales
- Family: Sapindaceae
- Subfamily: Dodonaeoideae
- Genus: Dodonaea; Mill.

Species
- See text

= Dodonaea =

Genus of flowering plants

Dodonaea, commonly known as hop-bushes, is a genus of about 70 species of flowering plants in the soapberry family, Sapindaceae. The genus has a cosmopolitan distribution in tropical, subtropical and warm temperate regions of Africa, the Americas, southern Asia and Australasia, but 59 species are endemic to Australia.

Plants in the genus Dodonaea are shrubs or small trees and often have sticky foliage, with simple or pinnate leaves arranged alternately along the stems. The flowers are male, female or bisexual and are borne in leaf axils or on the ends of branchlets and lack petals. The fruit is an angled or winged capsule.

== Description ==
Plants in the genus Dodonaea are shrubs or small trees that typically grow to a height of 0.1–4 m (3.9 in – 13 ft 1.5 in) and are dioecious, monoecious or polygamous and often have sticky foliage. The leaves are arranged alternately along the stems and are simple or pinnate. The flowers have three to seven sepals but that fall of as the flowers mature, but no petals. There are six to sixteen stamens (except in female flowers), the filaments shorter than the anthers, the style is threadlike and the ovary in female flowers has two to six carpels. The fruit is a two to six angled or winged capsule.

== Taxonomy ==
The genus Dodonaea was first formally described in 1754 by Philip Miller in The Gardeners Dictionary and the first species he described was Dodonaea viscosa. The genus name (Dodonaea) honours Dodonaeus, (the latinised form of Dodoens), a Flemish physician and botanist.

=== Systematics ===
Dodonaea is one of the largest genera in the Sapindaceae, and includes 70 species widely distributed in continental Australia. The only other species of the Dodonaea widely spread beyond mainland Australia, Dodonaea viscosa, is believed to be one of the world's most greatly disseminated transoceanic plants.

The first attempts to distinguish infrageneric categories within genus Dodonaea were based on leaf morphology, specifically, two sections - Eu-Dodonaea (simple leaves) and Remberta (pinnate leaves) were differentiated. Later this sectional classification was expanded by Bentham, who included 39 species in five series - four simple-leaved series further divided on capsule-appendage morphology (series Cyclopterae, Platypterae, Cornutae and Apterae) and one pinnate-leaved species (series Pinnatae).

Later the genus was reviewed extensively two times. Radlkofer identified Dodonaea as a part of the tribe Dodonaeeae, within Dyssapindaceae, together with Loxodiscus, Diplopeltis and Distichostemon. Dodonaea and Distichostemon share similar morphological characteristics which include plants having regular flowers without petals and an intrastaminal disc. Therefore, these two genera are considered to be closely related.

54 Dodonaea species identified by Radlkofer were divided into three series (Cyclopterae, Platypterae and Aphanopterae) and six subseries.

Another revision of the genus was proposed by West, where Dodonaea were divided into six species groups by using a combination of characters. Species with the most primitive characters were classified in Group 1 and Group 6 included plants with the most derived states. For instance, the character of an aril possession was recognized as a derived trait.

The most recent molecular study of phylogenetic relationships within the genus revealed some discrepancy with the previously stated hypotheses of morphological evolution within Dodonaea which classified taxa by the combination of leaf, capsule and seed characters. As in preceding morphological research, species with compound leaves were identified in several clades, interspersed among species with simple leaves (e.g. D. humilis is the only species in Clade I with imparipinnate leaves). The breeding system has great variation across the phylogeny, and although most species are dioecious, sometimes some species may differ from this state being monoecious. Most genera in Sapindaceae are dioecious, however, most closely related to Dodonaea in the phylogeny (Diplopeltis, Diplopeltis stuartii and Cossinia) are monoecious. It has also been reported that whereas normally breeding system in Harpullia is dioecism, a few species have also been recognized as monoecious. It was stated that during evolution a general breeding-system across the phylogeny was dioecism, however, the polygamous state was intermediate or, might be partially reversible.

Molecular data supports an evidence that monophyly of Dodonaea includes all species of Distichostemon. It is also supported by the morphological characters as synapomorphies of flowers with reduced petal number and with a highly reduced intrastaminal disk, the trait which is absent in staminate flowers. Both West and Radlkofer used an aril presence or absence as a character to define species groups. All the main clades of Dodonaea and also two species of Diplopeltis have small funicular arils. Seeds of D. viscosa have very small funicular aril, and are harvested by Pheidole ants and deposited in middens outside the nest after the elaiosome has been consumed.

Bayesian MCMC estimation of Dodonaea phylogeny supported the hypothesis that two species of Cossinia are sisters to Diplopeltis and Dodonaea. Nevertheless, Diplopeltis is identified as a paraphyletic group. The monophyly of Dodonaea is well supported by Bayesian MCMC estimation (1.00 posterior probability, PP).

Dodonaea viscosa is placed within the Clade IV, being closely related to D. biloba, D. procumbens and D. camfieldii. It is known that D. viscosa and D. camfieldii evolved in Australia from their most recent common ancestor.

=== Species ===
As of April 2024, the following species are accepted by Plants of the World Online in the genus Dodonaea:

- Dodonaea adenophora Miq. (W.A.)
- Dodonaea amblyophylla Diels (W.A.)
- Dodonaea amplisemina K.A.Sheph. & Rye (W.A.)
- Dodonaea aptera Miq. – coast hop-bush (W.A.)
- Dodonaea arnhemica (S.T.Reynolds) M.G.Harr. (N.T.)
- Dodonaea barklyana (S.T.Reynolds) M.G.Harr (N.T., Qld.)
- Dodonaea baueri Endl. (S.A.)
- Dodonaea biloba J.G.West (Qld.)
- Dodonaea boroniifolia G.Don – fern-leaf hop-bush, hairy hop-bush (N.S.W., Qld., Vic.)
- Dodonaea bursariifolia F.Muell. – small hop-bush (W.A., S.A., N.S.W., Vic.)
- Dodonaea caespitosa Diels (W.A.)
- Dodonaea camfieldii Maiden & Betche (N.S.W.)
- Dodonaea ceratocarpa Endl. (W.A)
- Dodonaea concinna Benth. (W.A.)
- Dodonaea coriacea (Ewart & O.B.Davies) McGill. (W.A., N.T., Qld.)
- Dodonaea divaricata Benth. (W.A.)
- Dodonaea dodecandra (Domin) M.G.Harr. (Qld.)
- Dodonaea ericoides Miq. (W.A.)
- Dodonaea falcata J.G.West (N.S.W., Qld.)
- Dodonaea filifolia Hook. (Qld.)
- Dodonaea filiformis Link (Tas.)
- Dodonaea glandulosa J.G.West (W.A.)
- Dodonaea hackettiana W.Fitzg. – Hackett's hopbush (W.A.)
- Dodonaea heteromorpha J.G.West (N.S.W., Qld.)
- Dodonaea hexandra F.Muell. – horned hop bush (S.A., Vic., W.A.)
- Dodonaea hirsuta Maiden & Betche (N.S.W., Qld.)
- Dodonaea hispidula Endl. (W.A., N.T., Qld.)
- Dodonaea humifusa Miq. (W.A.)
- Dodonaea humilis Endl. – limestone hop-bush (S.A.)
- Dodonaea inaequifolia Turcz. (W.A.)
- Dodonaea intricata J.G.West – Gawler Ranges hop bush (S.A., Qld.)
- Dodonaea lagunensis M.E.Jones (North-west Mexico)
- Dodonaea lanceolata F.Muell. – pirrungu, yellow hop-bush (W.A., N.T., Qld.)
- Dodonaea larreoides Turcz. (W.A.)
- Dodonaea lobulata F.Muell. – bead hopbush, lobed hop-bush (W.A., S.A., N.S.W.)
- Dodonaea macrossanii F.Muell. & Scort. (Qld., N.S.W.)
- Dodonaea madagascariensis Radlk. (Madagascar)
- Dodonaea malvacea (Domin) M.G.Harr. (Qld.)
- Dodonaea megazyga (F.Muell.) F.Muell. ex Benth. (N.S.W., Qld.)
- Dodonaea microzyga F.Muell. – brilliant hopbush
  - Dodonaea microzyga var. acrolobata J.G.West (W.A.)
  - Dodonaea microzyga F.Muell. var. microzyga (S.A., N.S.W., N.T., Qld.)
- Dodonaea multijuga G.Don. (Qld., N.S.W.)
- Dodonaea oxyptera F.Muell. (W.A., N.T., Qld.)
- Dodonaea pachyneura F.Muell. (W.A.)
- Dodonaea peduncularis Lindl. (Qld.)
- Dodonaea petiolaris F.Muell. (W.A., N.T., Qld., N.S.W.)
- Dodonaea physocarpa F.Muell. (W.A., N.T., Qld.)
- Dodonaea pinifolia Miq. (W.A.)
- Dodonaea pinnata Sm. – pinnate hop bush (N.S.W.)
- Dodonaea platyptera F.Muell. (W.A., N.T., Qld.)
- Dodonaea polyandra Merr. & L.M.Perry (Qld., New Guinea)
- Dodonaea polyzyga F.Muell. (W.A., N.T.)
- Dodonaea procumbens F.Muell. – trailing hop bush, creeping hop-bush (Vic., S.A., N.S.W.)
- Dodonaea ptarmicifolia Turcz. (W.A.)
- Dodonaea rhombifolia N.A.Wakef. – broad-leaf hop-bush (N.S.W., Vic.)
- Dodonaea rigida J.G.West (W.A.)
- Dodonaea rupicola C.T.White (Qld.)
- Dodonaea scurra K.A.Sheph. & R.A.Meissn. (W.A.)
- Dodonaea serratifolia McGill. (N.S.W.)
- Dodonaea sinuolata J.G.West (Qld., N.S.W.)
- Dodonaea stenophylla F.Muell. – netted hopbush (N.T., Qld., N.S.W.)
- Dodonaea stenozyga F.Muell. – desert hop-bush (W.A., S.A., N.S.W., Vic.)
- Dodonaea subglandulifera J.G.West – Peep Hill hop-bush (S.A.)
- Dodonaea tenuifolia Lindl. (Qld.)
- Dodonaea tepperi F.Muell. ex Tepper (S.A.)
- Dodonaea triangularis Lindl. – triangle-leaved hopbush (Qld., N.S.W.)
- Dodonaea trifida F.Muell. (W.A.)
- Dodonaea triquetra J.C.Wendl. – large-leaf hop-bush (Qld., N.S.W., Vic.)
- Dodonaea truncatiales F.Muell. – angular hop-bush (N.S.W., Vic.)
- Dodonaea uncinata J.G.West (Qld.)
- Dodonaea vestita Hook. (Qld.)
- Dodonaea viscosa Jacq.
