= List of Australian plant species authored by George Don =

This is a list of Australian plant species authored by George Don:

- Acacia brunioides A.Cunn. ex G.Don
- Acacia cultriformis A.Cunn. ex G.Don
- Acacia cyclops A.Cunn. ex G.Don
- Acacia deltoidea A.Cunn. ex G.Don
- Acacia fimbriata A.Cunn. ex G.Don
- Acacia holosericea A.Cunn. ex G.Don
- Acacia pendula A.Cunn. ex G.Don
- Acacia podalyriifolia A.Cunn. ex G.Don
- Acacia prominens A.Cunn. ex G.Don
- Acacia rigens A.Cunn. ex G.Don
- Acacia sertiformis A.Cunn. ex G.Don
- Alocasia macrorrhizos (L.) G.Don
- Aotus ericoides (Vent.) G.Don
- Brachychiton acerifolius (A.Cunn. ex G.Don) Macarthur & C.Moore
- Callistemon viminalis (Sol. ex Gaertn.) G.Don
- Catharanthus roseus (L.) G.Don
- Chrysophyllum roxburghii G.Don
- Clianthus formosus (G.Don) Ford & Vickery
- Crotalaria ochroleuca G.Don
- Daviesia leptophylla A.Cunn. ex G.Don
- Daviesia physodes A.Cunn. ex G.Don
- Decaspermum humile (G.Don) A.J.Scott
- Desmodium varians (Labill.) G.Don
- Dodonaea boroniifolia G.Don
- Dodonaea multijuga G.Don
- Elaeocarpus obovatus G.Don
- Hippobroma longiflora (L.) G.Don
- Hovea acutifolia A.Cunn. ex G.Don
- Hovea apiculata A.Cunn. ex G.Don
- Hoya linearis Wall. ex G.Don
- Isotoma scapigera (R.Br.) G.Don
- Lagunaria patersonia (Andrews) G.Don
- Ludwigia hyssopifolia (G.Don) Exell
- Melaleuca acerosa (Colla) G.Don
- Mirbelia rubiifolia (Andrews) G.Don
- Modiola caroliniana (L.) G.Don
- Oxylobium linariifolium (G.Don) Domin
- Rhodomyrtus psidioides (G.Don) Benth.
- Sagina maritima G.Don
- Scaevola sect. Xerocarpa G.Don
- Soliva stolonifera (Brot.) R.Br. ex G.Don
- Sphenotoma squarrosa (R.Br.) G.Don
- Swainsona formosa (G.Don) Joy Thomps.
- Villarsia exaltata (Sims) G.Don
- Viola caleyana G.Don,
