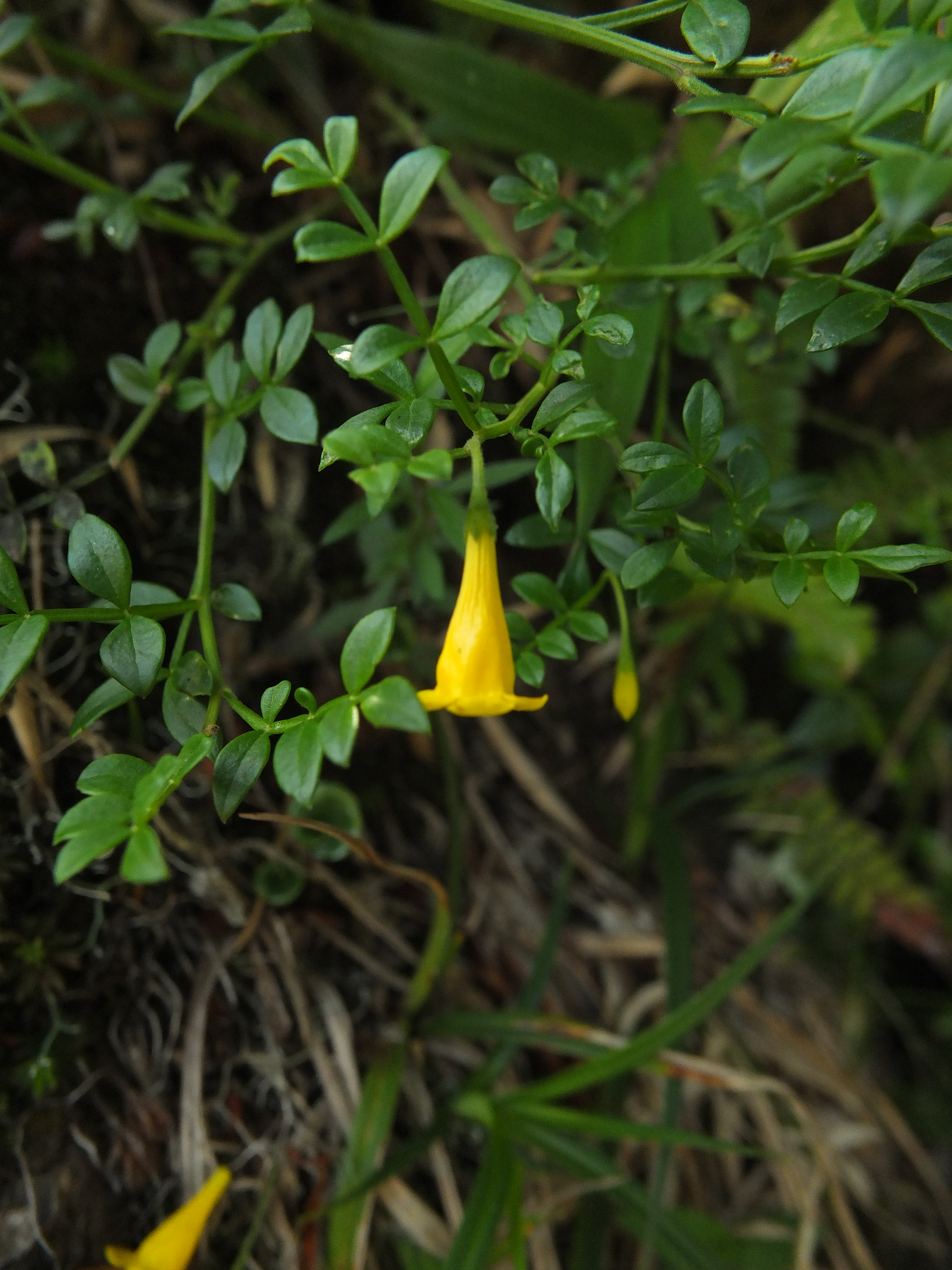

Scientific classification
- Kingdom: Plantae
- Clade: Tracheophytes
- Clade: Angiosperms
- Clade: Eudicots
- Clade: Asterids
- Order: Lamiales
- Family: Oleaceae
- Genus: Jasminum
- Species: J. bignoniaceum

Binomial name
- Jasminum bignoniaceum Wall. & G.Don

Synonyms
- Jasminum bignoniaceum subsp. bignoniaceum; Jasminum revolutum var. peninsulare DC.

= Jasminum bignoniaceum =

Species of jasmine

Jasminum bignoniaceum is a species of plant in the genus Jasminum of the family Oleaceae, commonly called the kurumozhi and pita. It is grown as garden plant in the High Ranges. It is found in Western Ghats. Native of Europe, now widely cultivated in Nilgiris.

== Description ==
Jasminum bignoniaceum is an erect shrub with angular branches, branchlets glabrous, shallowly angled from the base of 2 leaves above. Leaves are alternate, odd-pinnate, glabrous; petiole to 3 cm; leaflets 4 or 5 pairs, elliptic. Flower are cymes, opposite to the leaves, bright yellow. Flowering peaks from April–May. Fruit are berry type, globose, black when ripe with single seed. Fruiting from June onwards.
