= Acacia trapezoidea =

Scientific classification
- Kingdom: Plantae
- Clade: Tracheophytes
- Clade: Angiosperms
- Clade: Eudicots
- Clade: Rosids
- Order: Fabales
- Family: Fabaceae
- Subfamily: Caesalpinioideae
- Clade: Mimosoid clade
- Genus: Acacia
- Species: A. trapezoidea

Binomial name
- Acacia trapezoidea (DC.) G.Don

Species of legume

Acacia trapezoidea is a shrub of the genus Acacia and the subgenus Phyllodineae. It is native to an area in south western Australia.

== See also ==
- List of Acacia species
