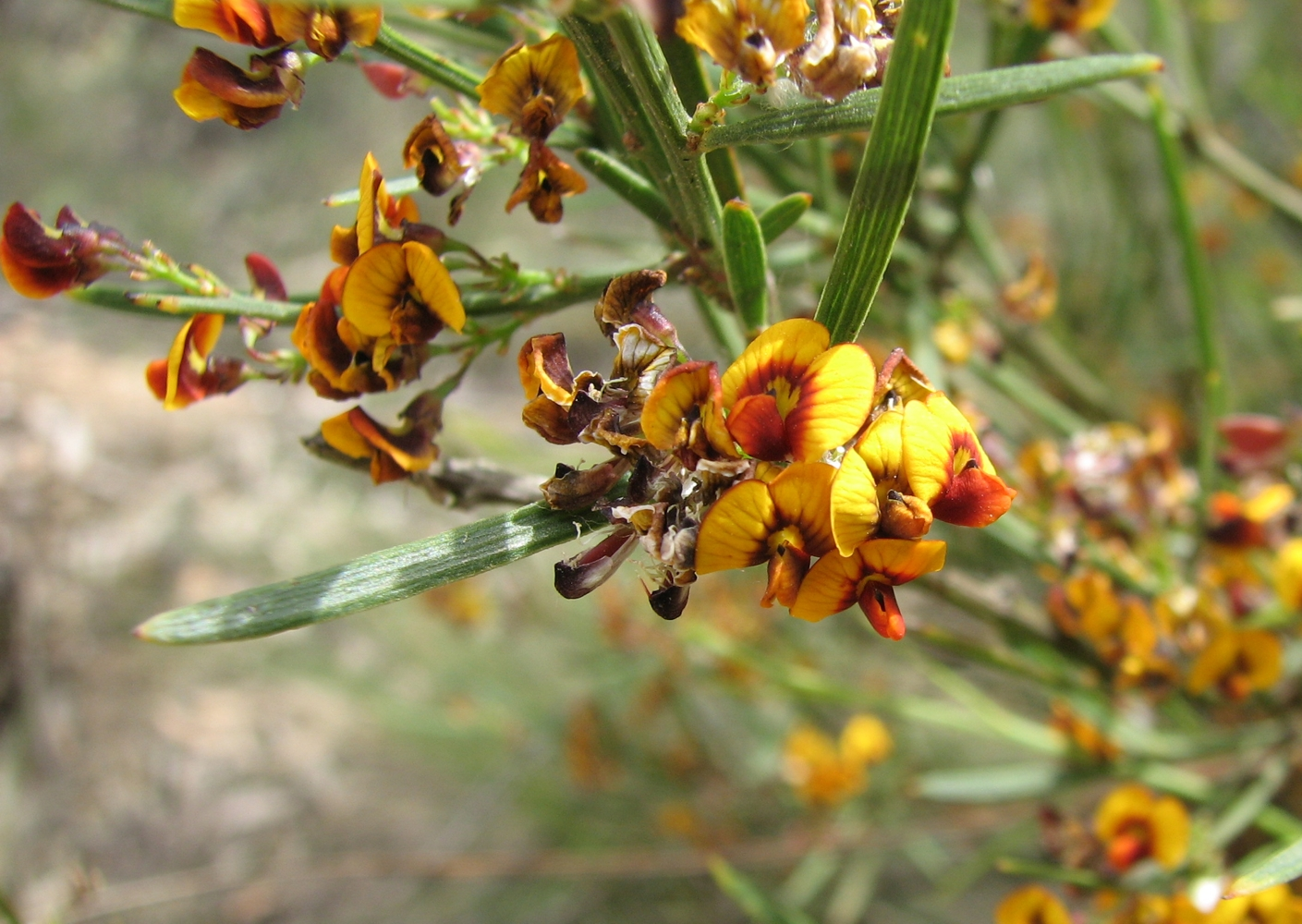
- Daviesia leptophylla in Enfield State Park

Scientific classification
- Kingdom: Plantae
- Clade: Tracheophytes
- Clade: Angiosperms
- Clade: Eudicots
- Clade: Rosids
- Order: Fabales
- Family: Fabaceae
- Subfamily: Faboideae
- Genus: Daviesia
- Species: D. leptophylla

Binomial name
- Daviesia leptophylla A.Cunn. ex G.Don

Synonyms
- Daviesia corymbosa var. stjohnii Anon. nom. inval., nom. nud.; Daviesia corymbosa var. stjohnii Ewart nom. inval., pro syn.; Daviesia corymbosa var. stjohnii Guilf. nom. inval.; Daviesia corymbosa var. virgata (A.Cunn. ex Hook.) Ewart; Daviesia virgata A.Cunn. ex Hook.

= Daviesia leptophylla =

Narrow-leaf bitter-pea

Species of plant

Daviesia leptophylla, commonly known as narrow-leaf bitter-pea or slender bitter pea, is a species of flowering plant in the family Fabaceae and is endemic to south-eastern continental Australia. It is a broom-like, multi-stemmed shrub with dull, yellowish-green, linear phyllodes and bright yellow flowers with maroon markings.

== Description ==
Daviesia leptophylla is a glabrous, broom-like, multi-stemmed shrub that typically grows to a height of up to about 2 m (6 ft 7 in) high or rarely, tree-like to 5 m (16 ft) wide. The phyllodes are scattered along the branchlets, linear, yellowish-green, up to 90 mm (3.5 in) long and 6 mm (0.24 in) wide. The flowers are borne in leaf axils usually on two racemes of five to ten flowers, the racemes on peduncles 1.3–5.0 mm (0.051–0.197 in) long, the rachis 1.5–6.0 mm (0.059–0.236 in) long, each flower on a pedicel 1.0–2.5 mm (0.039–0.098 in) long. The sepals are 3.4–4.7 mm (0.13–0.19 in) long and joined at the base, the upper two joined for most of their length and the lower three triangular and 0.50–0.75 mm (0.020–0.030 in) long. The standard petal is broadly elliptic with a notched centre, 6.0–6.5 mm (0.24–0.26 in) long and bright yellow with a maroon base and intensely yellow centre, the wings 5.0–6.0 mm (0.20–0.24 in) long and dark red with yellow edges, and the keel 4.0–4.5 mm (0.16–0.18 in) long and dark red. Flowering occurs from August to December and the fruit is flattened triangular pod 5–10 mm (0.20–0.39 in) long.

== Taxonomy ==
Daviesia leptophylla was first formally described in 1832 by George Don in his book A General History of Dichlamydeous Plants from an unpublished manuscript by Allan Cunningham. The specific epithet (leptophylla) means "slender-leaved".

== Distribution and habitat ==
Narrow-leaf bitter-pea grows in shrubland or forest, mostly on the slopes and tablelands at altitudes up to 1,400 m (4,600 ft), from Wellington in New South Wales through the Australian Capital Territory and central Victoria to the south-east of South Australia.
