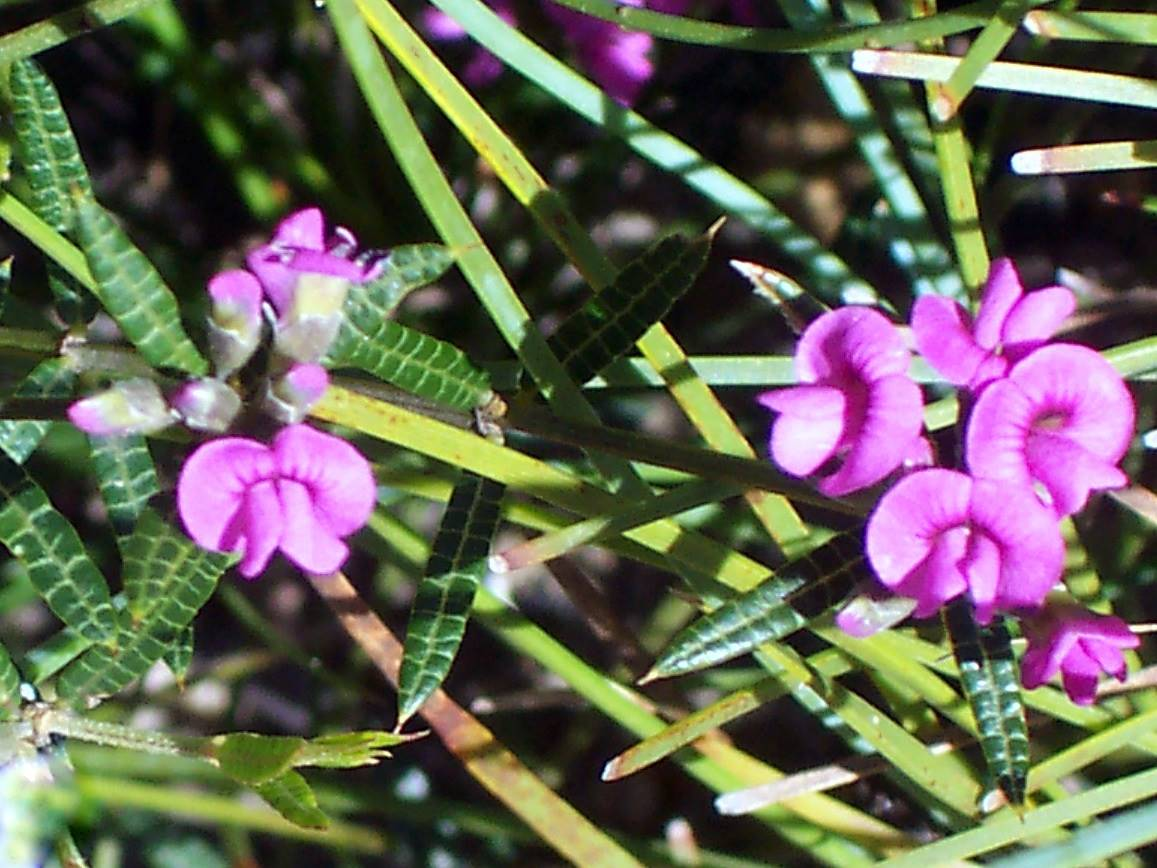
- In Morton National Park

Scientific classification
- Kingdom: Plantae
- Clade: Tracheophytes
- Clade: Angiosperms
- Clade: Eudicots
- Clade: Rosids
- Order: Fabales
- Family: Fabaceae
- Subfamily: Faboideae
- Genus: Mirbelia
- Species: M. rubiifolia

Binomial name
- Mirbelia rubiifolia (Andrews) G.Don

Synonyms
- Mirbelia reticulata Sm. nom. illeg., nom. superfl.; Mirbelia rubiaefolia G.Don orth. var.; Pultenaea rubiaefolia Andrews orth. var.; Pultenaea rubiifolia Andrews

= Mirbelia rubiifolia =

Species of legume

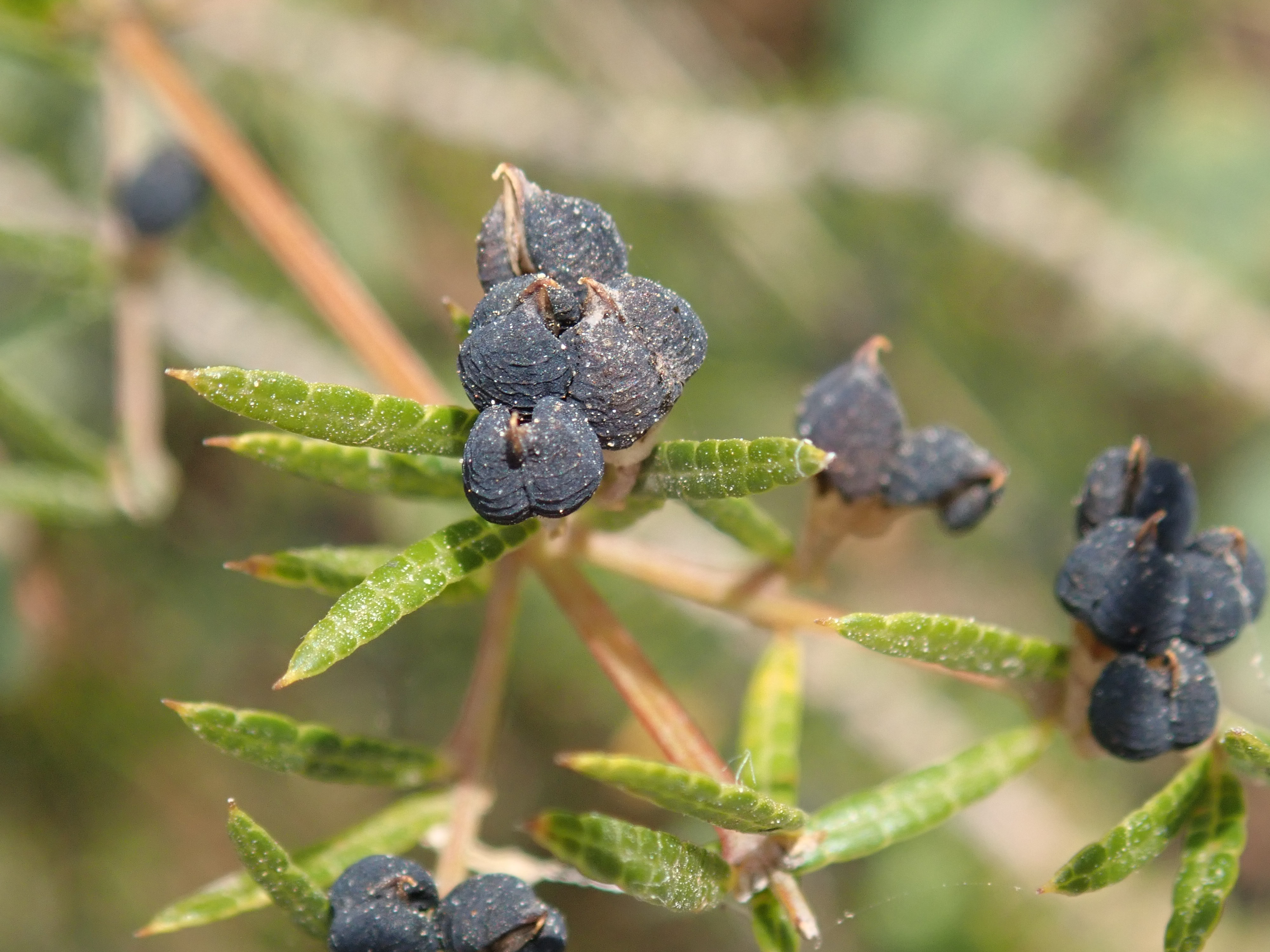
Fruit at Barrenjoey

Mirbelia rubiifolia, commonly known as heathy mirbelia, is a species of flowering plant in the family Fabaceae and is endemic to eastern Australia. It is a diffuse, spreading shrub with narrowly egg-shaped to linear, sharply-pointed leaves and clusters of pink to purple flowers.

== Description ==
Mirbelia rubiifolia is a diffuse, spreading shrub that typically grows to a height of up to 50 cm (20 in) and has angular stems, sometimes covered with soft hairs pressed against the surface. Its leaves are arranged in whorls of three, and are narrowly egg-shaped to lance-shaped or linear, mostly 10–25 mm (0.39–0.98 in) long, 2–4 mm (0.079–0.157 in) long and sharply pointed, on a petiole up to 1 mm (0.039 in) long. The upper surface has a conspicuous network of veins and the lower surface sometimes has a few scattered hairs. The flowers are arranged in clusters in leaf axils or in racemes on the ends of branches on silky-hairy pedicels up to 2 mm (0.079 in) long. The sepals are 3–4 mm (0.12–0.16 in) long and joined at the base, the upper two lobes almost completely fused. The petals are 8–9 mm (0.31–0.35 in) long and pink to purple, rarely white, the standard petal kidney-shaped and the keel much shorter than the wings. Flowering occurs from October to December and the fruit is an oval pod about 5 mm (0.20 in) long.

== Taxonomy ==
Heathy mirbelia was first formally described in 1804 by Henry Cranke Andrews who gave it the name Pultenaea rubiaefolia in The Botanist's Repository for New, and Rare Plants, from material that had been taken to England and cultivated by Lee and Kennedy in Hammersmith in 1792. James Edward Smith changed the name to Mirbelia reticulata in 1805, noting that "[t]he leaves are elegantly reticulated with transverse veins, as if stitched with thread" but the name is illegitimate. In 1832, George Don changed the name to Mirbelia rubiifolia in A General History of Dichlamydeous Plants. The specific epithet (rubiifolia) refers to the resemblance of its leaves to those of the genus Rubus.

== Distribution and habitat ==
Heathy mirbelia is found in sclerophyll forest and woodlands, as well as in heath on sandy soils on the coast or tablelands, often in areas liable to inundation. It is found from Croajingolong National Park in Victoria northward through New South Wales to Queensland.

== Use in horticulture ==
Mirbelia rubiifolia is rarely cultivated, but adapts well to a part-shaded spot in a subtropical garden. Supplementary water in dry spells is beneficial. It can be an untidy and scrambling shrub which can look better with pruning.
