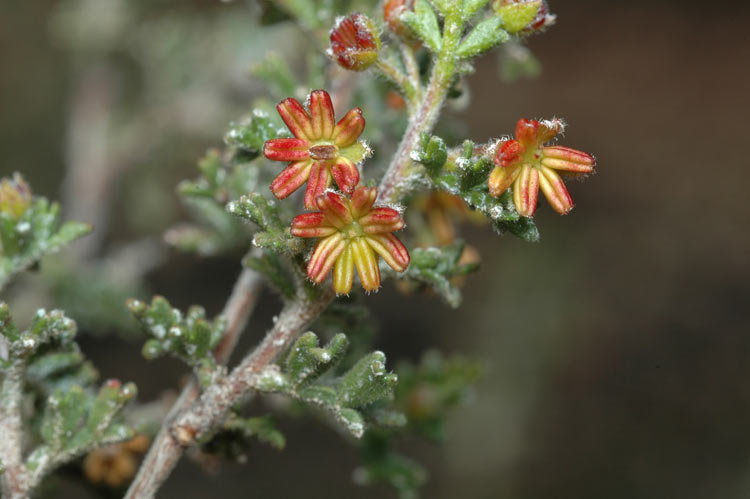
- Near the Taemas Bridge

Scientific classification
- Kingdom: Plantae
- Clade: Tracheophytes
- Clade: Angiosperms
- Clade: Eudicots
- Clade: Rosids
- Order: Sapindales
- Family: Sapindaceae
- Genus: Dodonaea
- Species: D. boroniifolia

Binomial name
- Dodonaea boroniifolia G.Don

Synonyms
- Dodonaea boroniaefolia G.Don orth. var.; Dodonaea boronifolia F.Muell. orth. var.; Dodonaea caleyana G.Don; Dodonaea hirtella Miq.

= Dodonaea boroniifolia =

Species of flowering plant

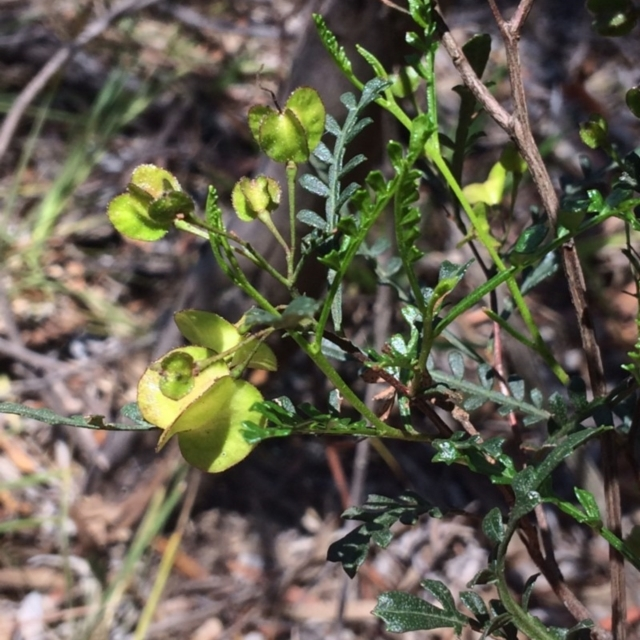
Fruiting capsules in Aranda

Dodonaea boroniifolia, commonly known as fern-leaf hop-bush or hairy hop-bush, is a species of plant in the family Sapindaceae and is endemic to eastern Australia. It is a spreading to erect shrub with imparipinnate leaves, the leaflets egg-shaped with the narrower end towards the base, flowers arranged in pairs or threes in leaf axils, and broadly elliptical capsules with four broadly elliptic wings.

== Description ==
Dodonaea boroniifolia is a usually a dioecious, spreading to erect shrub that typically grows to a height of 2–4 m (6 ft 7 in – 13 ft 1 in). Its branches are densely hairy and its leaves are imparipinnate, 6–40 mm (0.24–1.57 in) long with six to sixteen narrowly egg-shaped leaflets with the narrower end towards the base, 2.5–10 mm (0.098–0.394 in) long and 1.5–15 mm (0.059–0.591 in) wide, the petiole 1–8 mm (0.039–0.315 in) long. The flowers are arranged in pairs or groups of three in leaf axils, each flower on a pedicel 4–8 mm (0.16–0.31 in) long, with four lance-shaped to egg-shaped, sticky sepals 2–4 mm (0.079–0.157 in) long but that fall off as the flowers develop. There are eight to ten densely hairy stamens that are longer than the sepals. The fruit is a broadly elliptical capsule, 10–20 mm (0.39–0.79 in) long and 12–18 mm (0.47–0.71 in) wide, with four membranous wings 2.5–5 mm (0.098–0.197 in) wide.

== Taxonomy ==
Dodonaea boroniifolia was first formally described in 1831 by George Don in his book, A General History of Dichlamydeous Plants. The specific epithet (boroniifolia) means 'having leaves similar to the genus Boronia'.

== Distribution and habitat ==
This species of Dodonaea grows in a variety of habitats including forest, open woodland and heath from Charters Towers in north-eastern Queensland, through central and eastern New South Wales to north-central and north-eastern Victoria.

== Conservation status ==
Dodonaea barklyana is listed as "endangered" in Victoria, under the Victorian Government Flora and Fauna Guarantee Act 1988.
