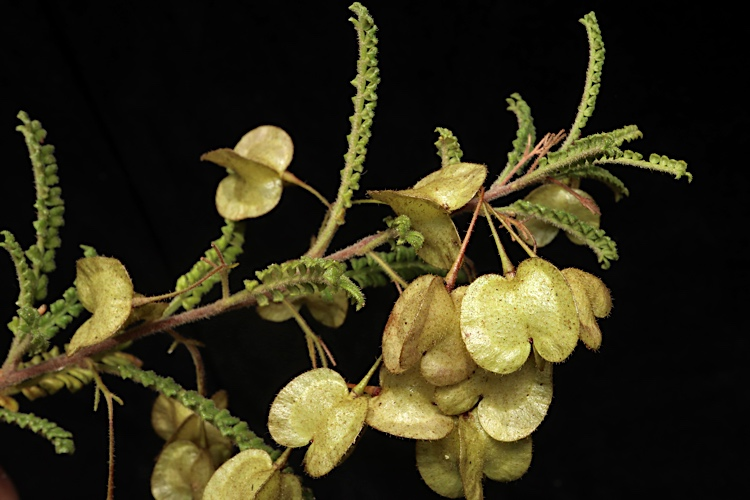
- Fruit

Scientific classification
- Kingdom: Plantae
- Clade: Tracheophytes
- Clade: Angiosperms
- Clade: Eudicots
- Clade: Rosids
- Order: Sapindales
- Family: Sapindaceae
- Genus: Dodonaea
- Species: D. multijuga

Binomial name
- Dodonaea multijuga G.Don

Synonyms
- Dodonaea hirtella auct. non Miq.: Mueller, F.J.H. von (February 1862), Thalamiflorae.

= Dodonaea multijuga =

Species of shrub

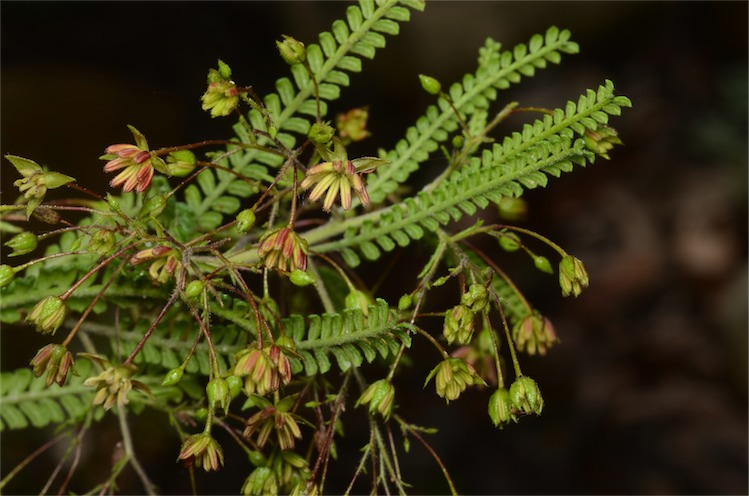
Flowers in the ANBG

Dodonaea multijuga is a species of plant in the family Sapindaceae and is endemic to eastern Australia. It is an erect, dioecious shrub with imparipinnate leaves usually with 16 to 28 oblong to broadly egg-shaped or triangular leaflets, flowers arranged in panicles, the flowers usually with four sepals and eight stamens, and capsules with 3 wings.

== Description ==
Dodonaea multijuga is an erect, dioecious shrub that typically grows to a height of up to 1.5 m (4 ft 11 in). Its leaves are imparipinnate, 20–48 mm (0.79–1.89 in) long on a petiole 3.5–8 mm (0.14–0.31 in) long, usually with between 16 and 28 oblong to broadly egg-shaped or triangular leaflets with the narrower end towards the base, mostly 4–7 mm (0.16–0.28 in) long and 1–4 mm (0.039–0.157 in) wide and covered with soft hairs. The flowers are arranged in panicles in leaf axils, each flower on a pedicel 7–14 mm (0.28–0.55 in) long, usually with four lance-shaped sepals, 3–4 mm (0.12–0.16 in) long that fall off as the flowers open, and usually eight stamens. The ovary is densely covered with soft hairs. Flowering occurs from September to March, and the fruit is a three-winged, broadly egg-shaped capsule 13–16.5 mm (0.51–0.65 in) long and 15–20 mm (0.59–0.79 in) wide.

== Taxonomy ==
Dodonaea multijuga was first formally described in 1831 by George Don in his book A General History of Dichlamydeous Plants. The specific epithet (multijuga) means 'with many yoked together'.

== Distribution and habitat ==
This species of Dodonaea grows in forest in sandy soil, often near watercourses from far south-east Queensland to near the Victorian border in New South Wales.

== Conservation status ==
Dodonaea multijuga is listed as of "least concern" under the Queensland Government Nature Conservation Act 1992.
