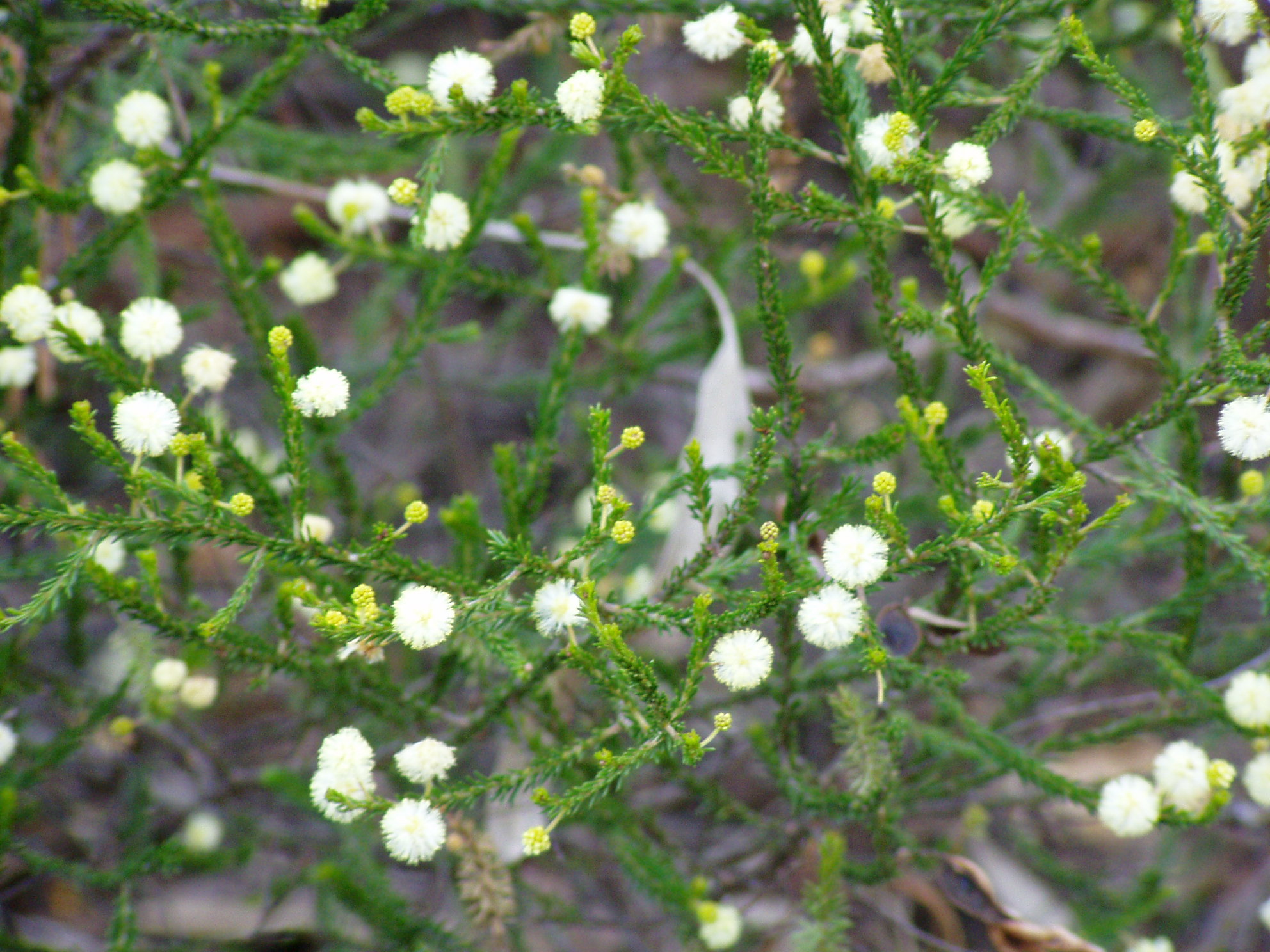
- Subspecies brunioides in the Australian National Botanic Gardens

Scientific classification
- Kingdom: Plantae
- Clade: Embryophytes
- Clade: Tracheophytes
- Clade: Spermatophytes
- Clade: Angiosperms
- Clade: Eudicots
- Clade: Rosids
- Order: Fabales
- Family: Fabaceae
- Subfamily: Caesalpinioideae
- Clade: Mimosoid clade
- Genus: Acacia
- Species: A. brunioides

Binomial name
- Acacia brunioides A.Cunn. ex G.Don
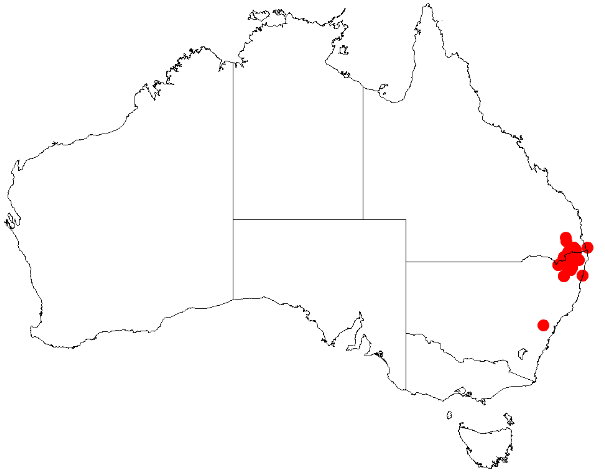
- Occurrence data from AVH

Synonyms
- Racosperma brunioides (G.Don) Pedley

= Acacia brunioides =

Species of legume

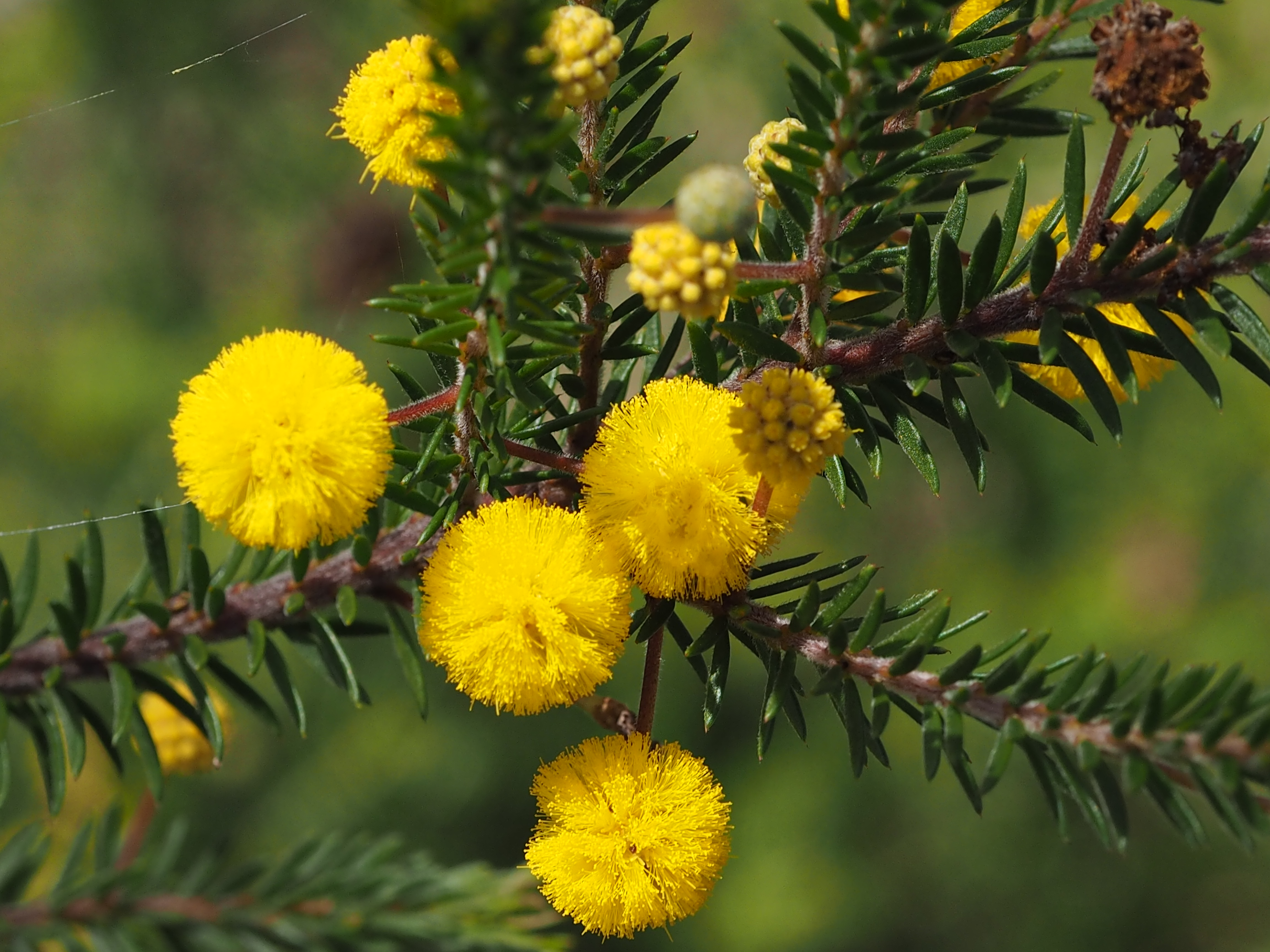
Flowers of subsp. brunioides in the Gibraltar Range National Park

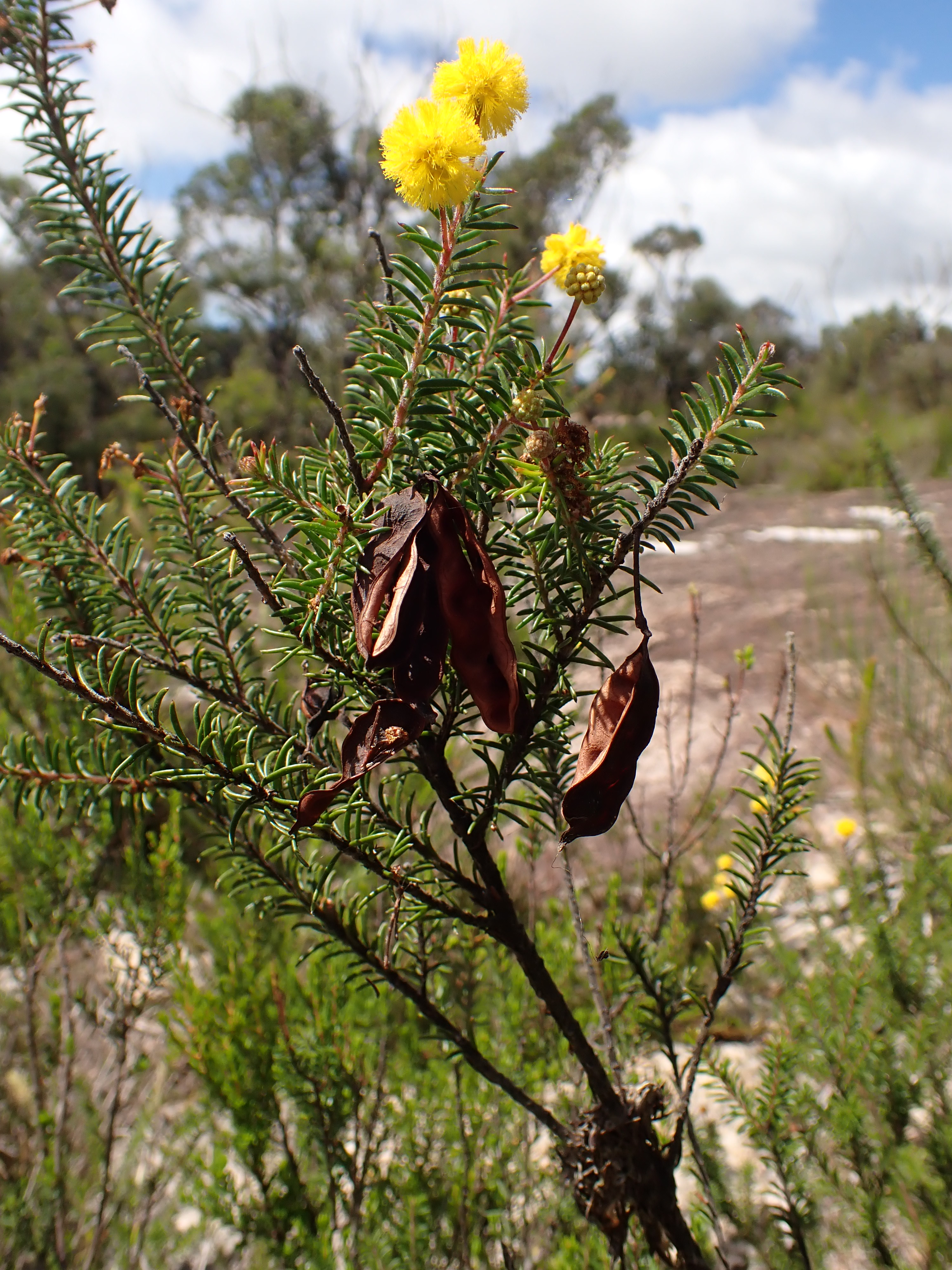
Fruit of subsp. brunioides

Acacia brunioides, commonly known as brown wattle is a species of flowering plant in the family Fabaceae and is endemic to eastern Australia. It is an erect or spreading shrub with more or less cylindrical phyllodes, inflorescences arranged singly in leaf axils, each with 20 to 27 more or less white to bright yellow flowers, and straight, papery to leathery pods up to 15–60 mm (0.59–2.36 in) long.

== Description ==
Acacia brunioides is an erect or spreading shrub that typically grows to a height of 0.5–2.5 m (1 ft 8 in – 8 ft 2 in). It has crowded, spirally arranged, straight or slightly curved cylindrical phyllodes that are 2.5–12 mm (0.098–0.472 in) long and 0.4–1 mm (0.016–0.039 in) wide and green to more or less glaucous. The inflorescences are 7–9 mm (0.28–0.35 in) in diameter, arranged singly in the axil of phyllodes on a peduncle 5–11 mm (0.20–0.43 in) long, each with 20 to 27 more or less white to bright yellow flowers. Flowering occurs in August and September and the fruit is a papery to thin leathery pod 15–60 mm (0.59–2.36 in) long and 6–15 mm (0.24–0.59 in) wide.

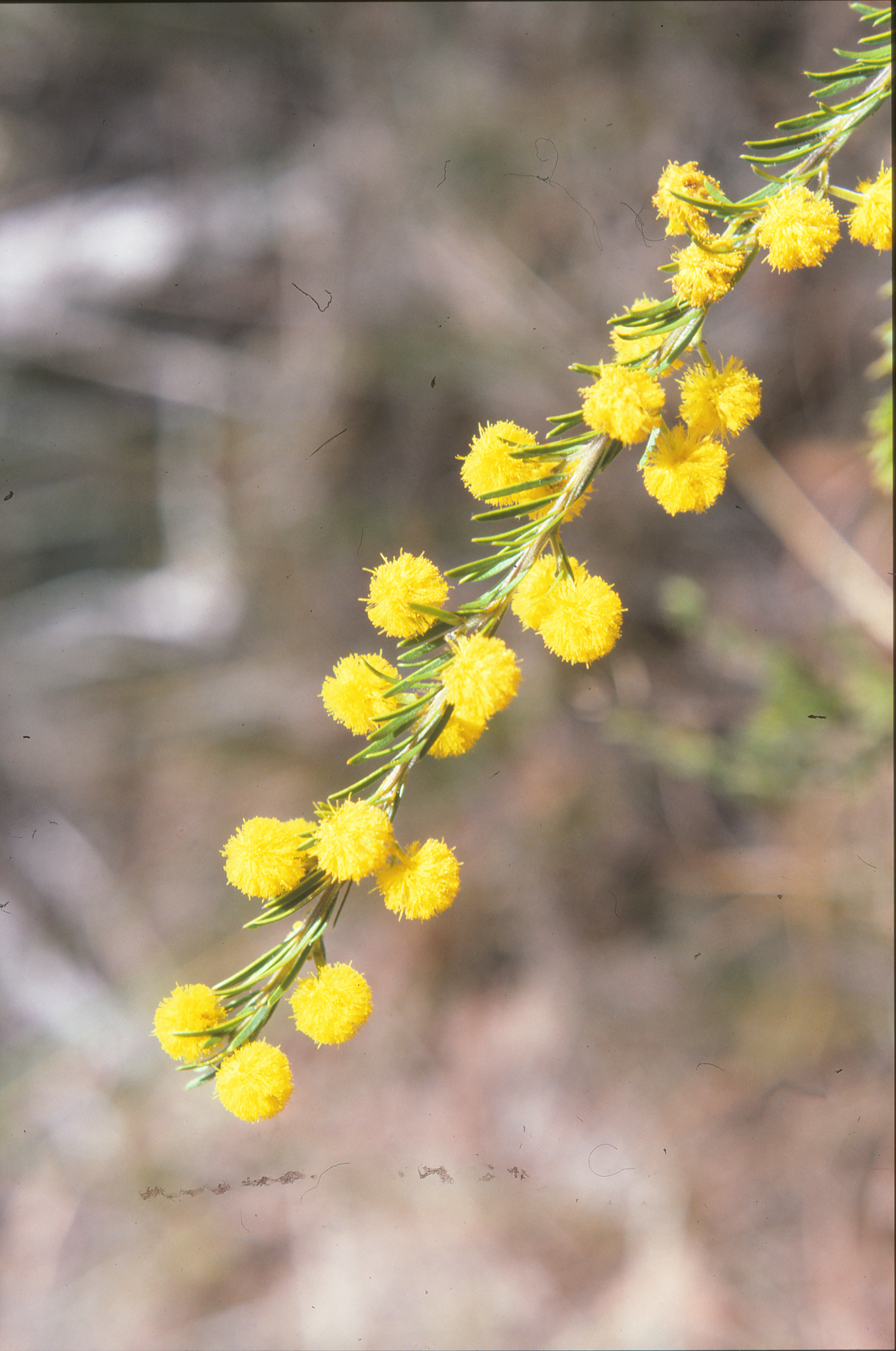
Acacia brunioides subsp. granitica foliage and inflorescences, Girraween National Park, Queensland.

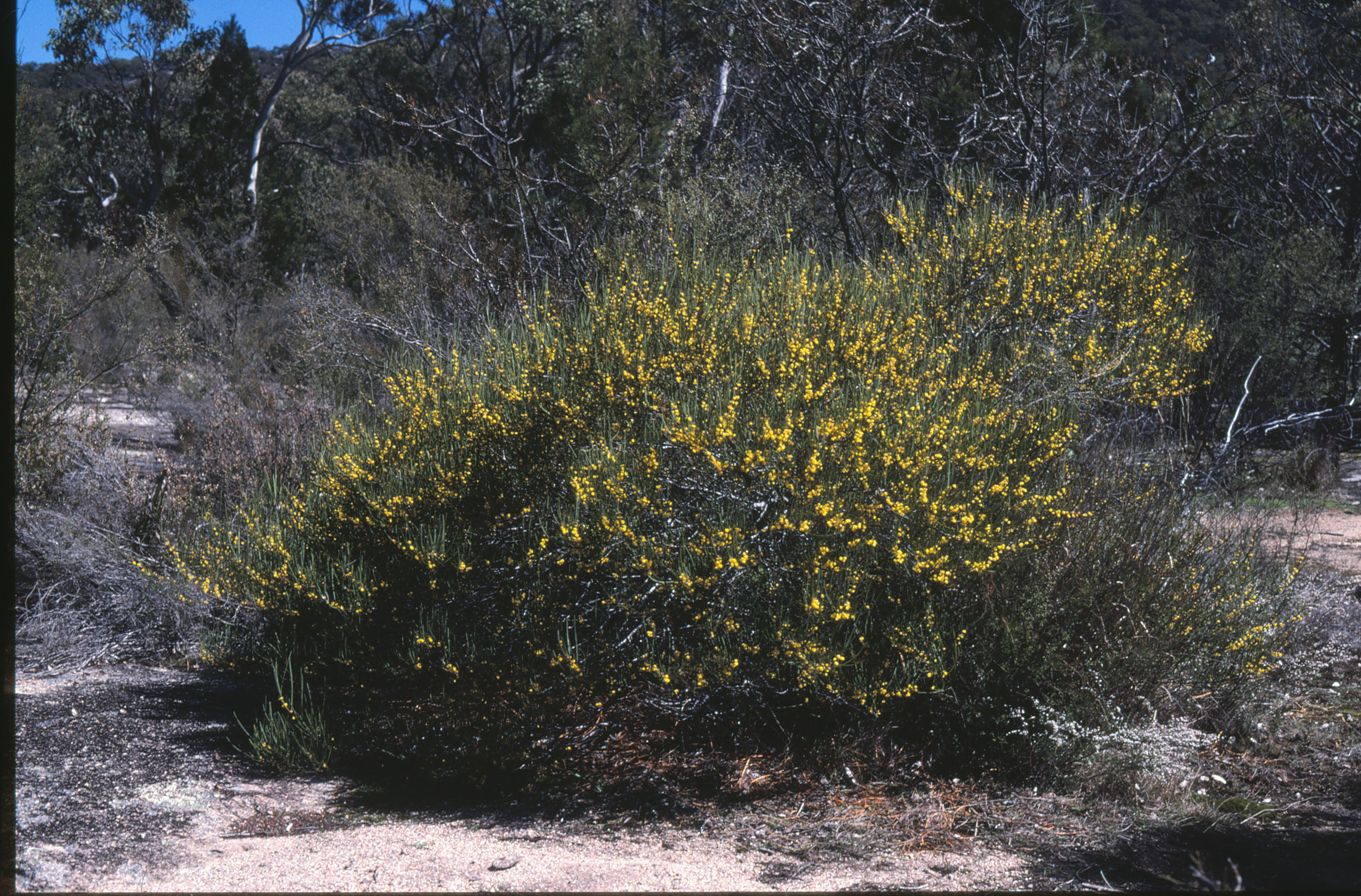
Acacia brunioides subsp. granitica habit and habitat, Girraween National Park, Queensland.

== Taxonomy ==
Acacia brunioides was first formally described in 1832 by George Don in his book A General History of Dichlamydeous Plants, from an unpublished manuscript by Allan Cunningham. The specific epithet (brunioides) means "Brunia-like".

The names of 2 subspecies of A. brunioides are accepted by the Australian Plant Census:

- Acacia brunioides A.Cunn. ex G.Don subsp. brunioides has phyllodes 2.5–7 mm (0.098–0.276 in) long and pale yellow to cream-coloured or almost white flowers on a peduncle 4–12 mm (0.16–0.47 in) long, and pods 7–10 mm (0.28–0.39 in) wide.
- Acacia brunioides subsp. granitica Pedley has phyllodes 5–12 mm (0.20–0.47 in) long and bright yellow flowers, and pods 9–15 mm (0.35–0.59 in) wide.

== Distribution and habitat ==
This species of Acacia grows in forest and heath north from the Glen Innes district. Subspecies brunioides is common on rocky outcrops in the Gibraltar Range and Washpool National Parks, on and near the McPherson Range and near the Tooloom and Urbenville areas. Subspecies granitica is restricted to higher altitudes near Stanthorpe and Wallangarra in Queensland.

== See also ==
- List of Acacia species
