= Hoya latifolia =

Scientific classification
- Kingdom: Plantae
- Clade: Tracheophytes
- Clade: Angiosperms
- Clade: Eudicots
- Clade: Asterids
- Order: Gentianales
- Family: Apocynaceae
- Genus: Hoya
- Species: H. latifolia

Binomial name
- Hoya latifolia G.Don

Synonyms
- Hoya macrophylla Wight; Hoya clandestina Blume; Hoya latifolia subsp. kinabaluensis C.M.Burton; Hoya polystachya Blume; Hoya tjadasmalangensis Bakh.f.

Species of flowering plant

Hoya latifolia is a species of plant in the frangipani family Apocynaceae. It is native to Borneo, Java, Malaya, Myanmar, Sumatra and Thailand.
