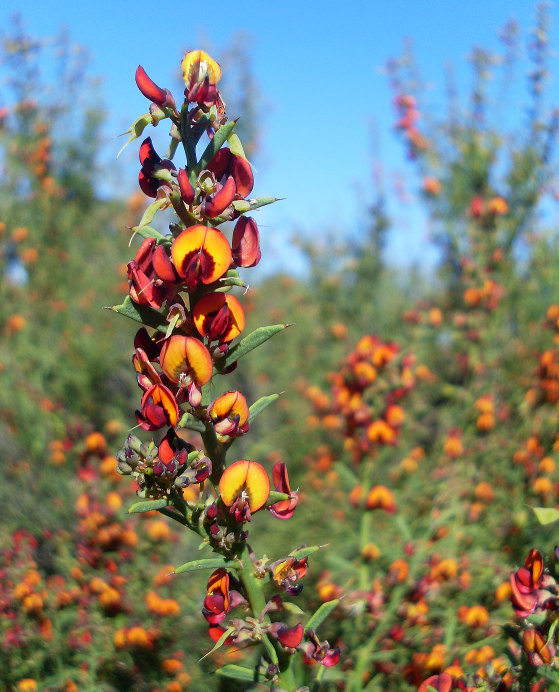

Scientific classification
- Kingdom: Plantae
- Clade: Tracheophytes
- Clade: Angiosperms
- Clade: Eudicots
- Clade: Rosids
- Order: Fabales
- Family: Fabaceae
- Subfamily: Faboideae
- Genus: Daviesia
- Species: D. physodes

Binomial name
- Daviesia physodes A.Cunn. ex G.Don

Synonyms
- Daviesia physodes A.Cunn. ex G.Don f. physodes

= Daviesia physodes =

Species of flowering plant

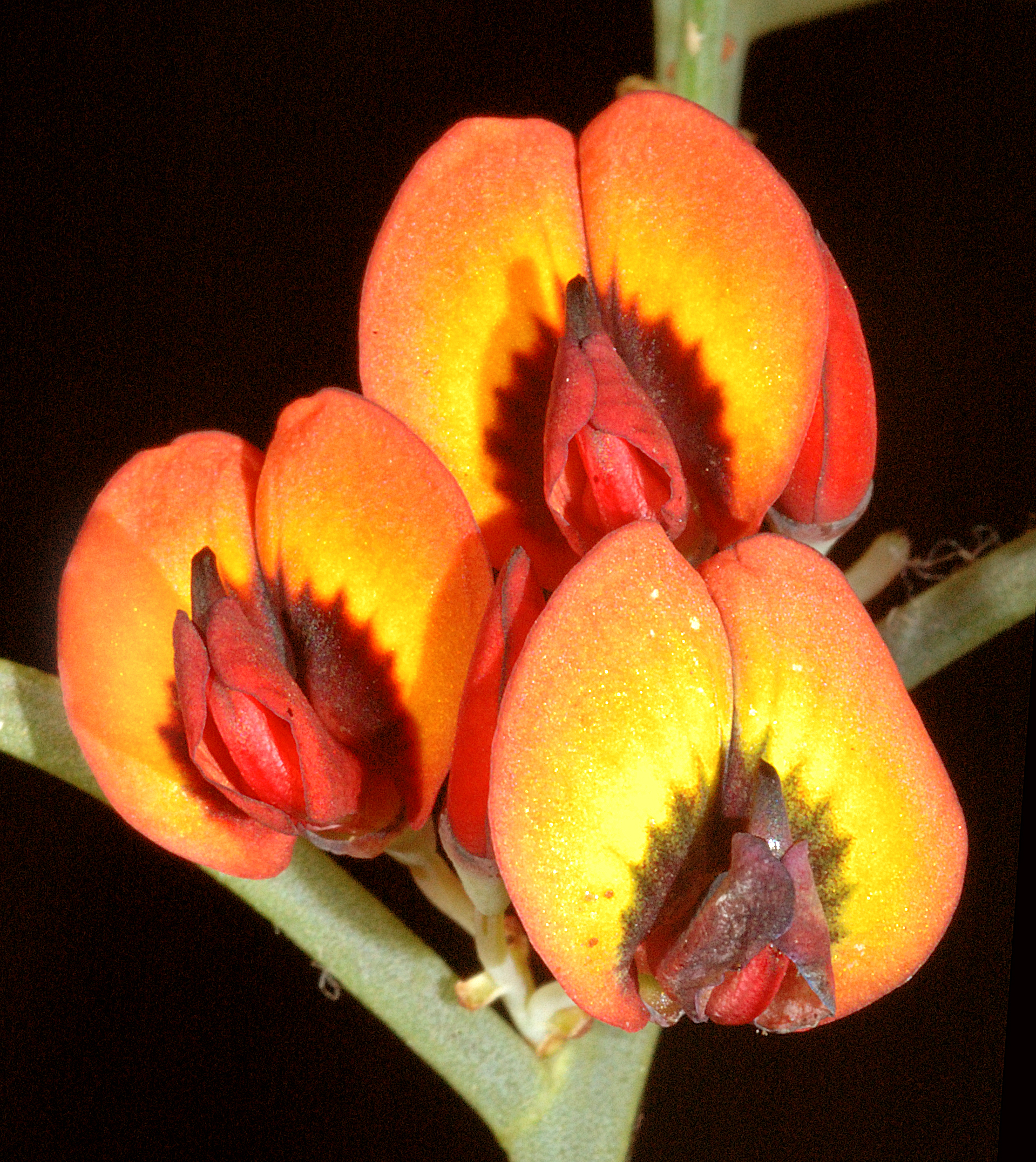
Flower detail

Daviesia physodes is a species of flowering plant in the family Fabaceae and is endemic to near-coastal areas of south-western Western Australia. It is an open shrub with vertically flattened or tapering, sharply-pointed phyllodes, and yellow and pink to red flowers.

== Description ==
Daviesia physodes is an open, glabrous, usually glaucous shrub that typically grows to a height of up to 1.8 m (5 ft 11 in). The phyllodes on the lower part of the plant are vertically flattened, wedge-shaped, up to 55 mm (2.2 in) long and 10 mm (0.39 in) high, those near the ends of the branchlets tapering and sharply pointed, up to 22 mm (0.87 in) long and 3 mm (0.12 in) wide. The flowers are arranged in groups of two to four on a peduncle about 0.5 mm (0.020 in) long, the rachis about 0.5 mm (0.020 in) long, each flower on a pedicel 1.5–3 mm (0.059–0.118 in) long. The sepals are about 1.75 mm (0.069 in) long, the upper two lobes joined for most of their length and the lower three about 0.25 mm (0.0098 in) long. The standard petal is broadly egg-shaped with a notched centre, about 7 mm (0.28 in) long and 8 mm (0.31 in) wide, yellow with pink tinge. The wings are 5.5–6.0 mm (0.22–0.24 in) long and pink to red, the keel 7.0–7.5 mm (0.28–0.30 in) long and pink to red. Flowering occurs from July to November and the fruit is an inflated, triangular pod 11–16 mm (0.43–0.63 in) long.

== Taxonomy and naming ==
Daviesia physodes was first formally described in 1832 by George Don in his book A General History of Dichlamydeous Plants from an unpublished manuscript by Allan Cunningham. The specific epithet (physodes) means "a pair of bellows", referring to the bladdery fruit of this species.

== Distribution and habitat ==
This bitter-pea grows in open forest or kwongan between Geraldton, Augusta and Narrogin in near-coastal areas of the Geraldton Sandplains, Jarrah Forest and Swan Coastal Plain biogeographic regions of south-western Western Australia.
