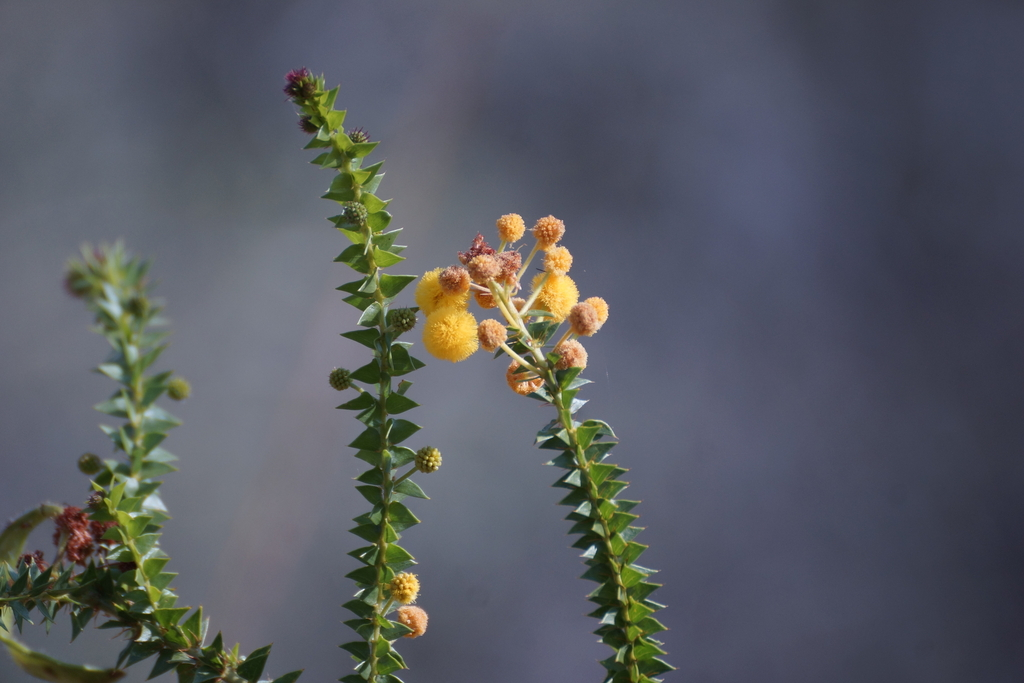

Scientific classification
- Kingdom: Plantae
- Clade: Tracheophytes
- Clade: Angiosperms
- Clade: Eudicots
- Clade: Rosids
- Order: Fabales
- Family: Fabaceae
- Subfamily: Caesalpinioideae
- Clade: Mimosoid clade
- Genus: Acacia
- Species: A. deltoidea

Binomial name
- Acacia deltoidea A.Cunn. ex G.Don
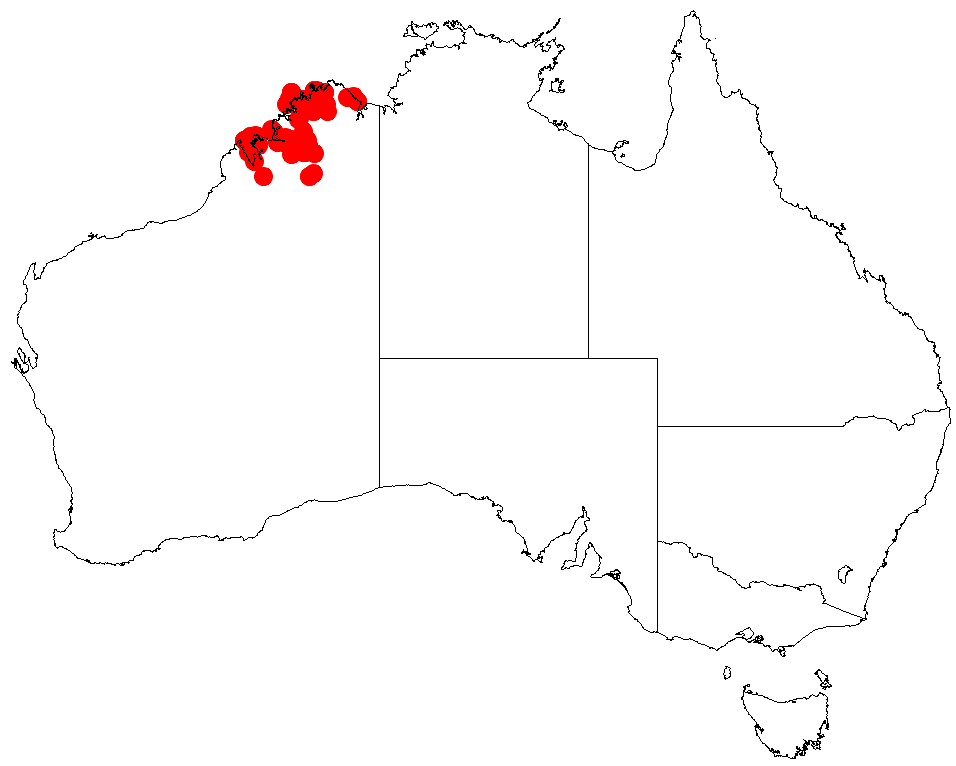
- Occurrence data from AVH

Synonyms
- Acacia deltoiden Benth. orth. var.; Acacia deltoideum Pedley orth. var.; Racosperma deltoideum (G.Don) Pedley

= Acacia deltoidea =

Species of legume

Acacia deltoidea is a species of flowering plant in the family Fabaceae and is endemic to the north of Western Australia. It is a shrub with hairy branchlets, overlapping wedge-shaped, elliptic, egg-shaped or Δ-shaped phyllodes, spherical heads of dark golden yellow flowers and oblong, thinly leathery pods.

== Description ==
Acacia deltoidea is a shrub that typically grows to a height of 1.5–3 m (4 ft 11 in – 9 ft 10 in) and has hairy branchlets. Its phyllodes are overlapping, more or less sessile, wedge-shaped, elliptic, egg-shaped or Δ-shaped with the narrower end towards the base, 6–20 mm (0.24–0.79 in) long and mostly 4–7 mm (0.16–0.28 in) wide. There is a gland on the upper edge and the phyllodes are more or less leathery and more or less sharply pointed. The flowers are borne in a spherical head in axils on a peduncle 6–25 mm (0.24–0.98 in) long, each head 5–6 mm (0.20–0.24 in) in diameter with 56 to 73 dark golden yellow flowers. Flowering time depends on species, and the pods are oblong, up to 42 mm (1.7 in) long and 10–12 mm (0.39–0.47 in) wide, thinly leathery and slightly raised over the seeds. The seeds are about 5 mm (0.20 in) long and dull dark brown with an aril on the end.

== Taxonomy ==
Acacia deltoidea was first formally described in 1832 by George Don in his book, A General History of Dichlamydeous Plants. The specific epithet (deltoidea) means 'shaped like the Greek letter δ', referring to the phyllodes.

In 1990, Richard Cowan and Bruce Maslin described two subspecies of A. deltoidea in the journal Nuytsia, and the names are accepted by the Australian Plant Census:

- Acacia deltoidea subsp. ampla R.S.Cowan & Maslin has most of its phyllodes broadest below the middle and 5–7 mm (0.20–0.28 in) wide, and flowering occurs in June and July.
- Acacia deltoidea A.Cunn. ex G.Don subsp. deltoidea has most of its phyllodes broadest at or above the middle and 4–6 mm (0.16–0.24 in), sometimes 2 mm (0.079 in) wide, and flowering mainly occurs from May to August.

== Distribution ==
This species of wattle is native to an area in the West Kimberley region of northern Western Australia from along the Bonaparte Archipelago and Napier Broome Bay areas and inland to Kimberley Downs Station, Beverley Springs Station and Phillips Range in the east. It is usually found growing in sandy soils over and around sandstone and quartzite.

Subspecies ampla is only known from a few places in the Admiralty Gulf area.

== Conservation status ==
Acacia deltoidea subsp. deltoidea is listed as "not threatened" by the Government of Western Australia Department of Biodiversity, Conservation and Attractions, but subsp. ampla is listed as "Priority Two" , meaning that it is poorly known and from one or a few locations.

== See also ==
- List of Acacia species
