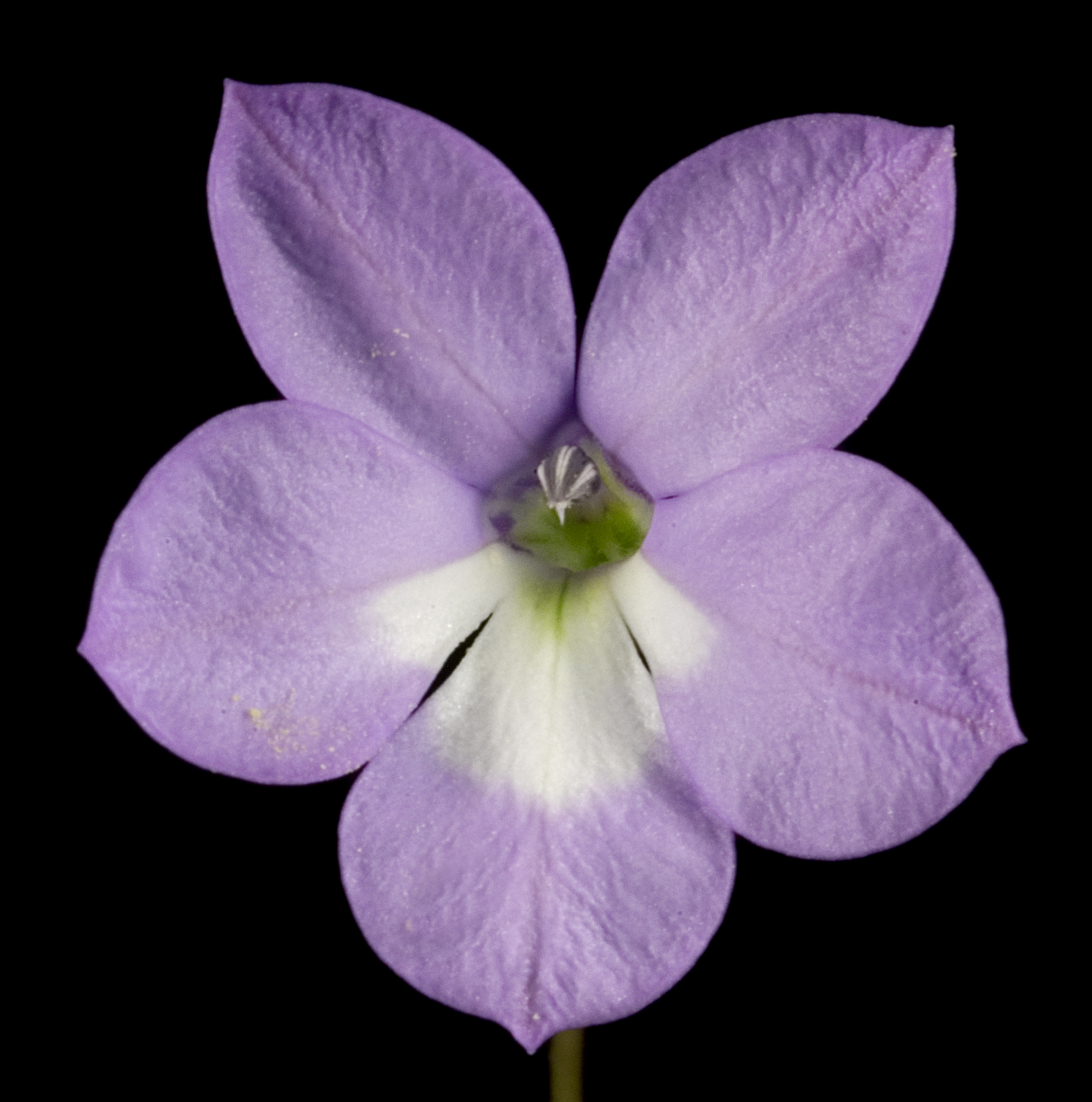

Scientific classification
- Kingdom: Plantae
- Clade: Tracheophytes
- Clade: Angiosperms
- Clade: Eudicots
- Clade: Asterids
- Order: Asterales
- Family: Campanulaceae
- Genus: Isotoma
- Species: I. scapigera

Binomial name
- Isotoma scapigera (R.Br.) G.Don

= Isotoma scapigera =

Long-scaped isotome

Species of flowering plant

Isotoma scapigera, commonly known as long-scaped isotome, is a small herbaceous plant in the family Campanulaceae native to Western Australia.

The erect, annual herb typically grows to a height of 0.05 to 0.15 metres (0.2 to 0.5 ft). It blooms between September and December, producing blue-purple flowers.

It is found in wet depressions, around salt lakes and on sand dunes in the Mid West, Wheatbelt, South West and Goldfields-Esperance regions of Western Australia where it grows in shallow sandy-clay soils.
