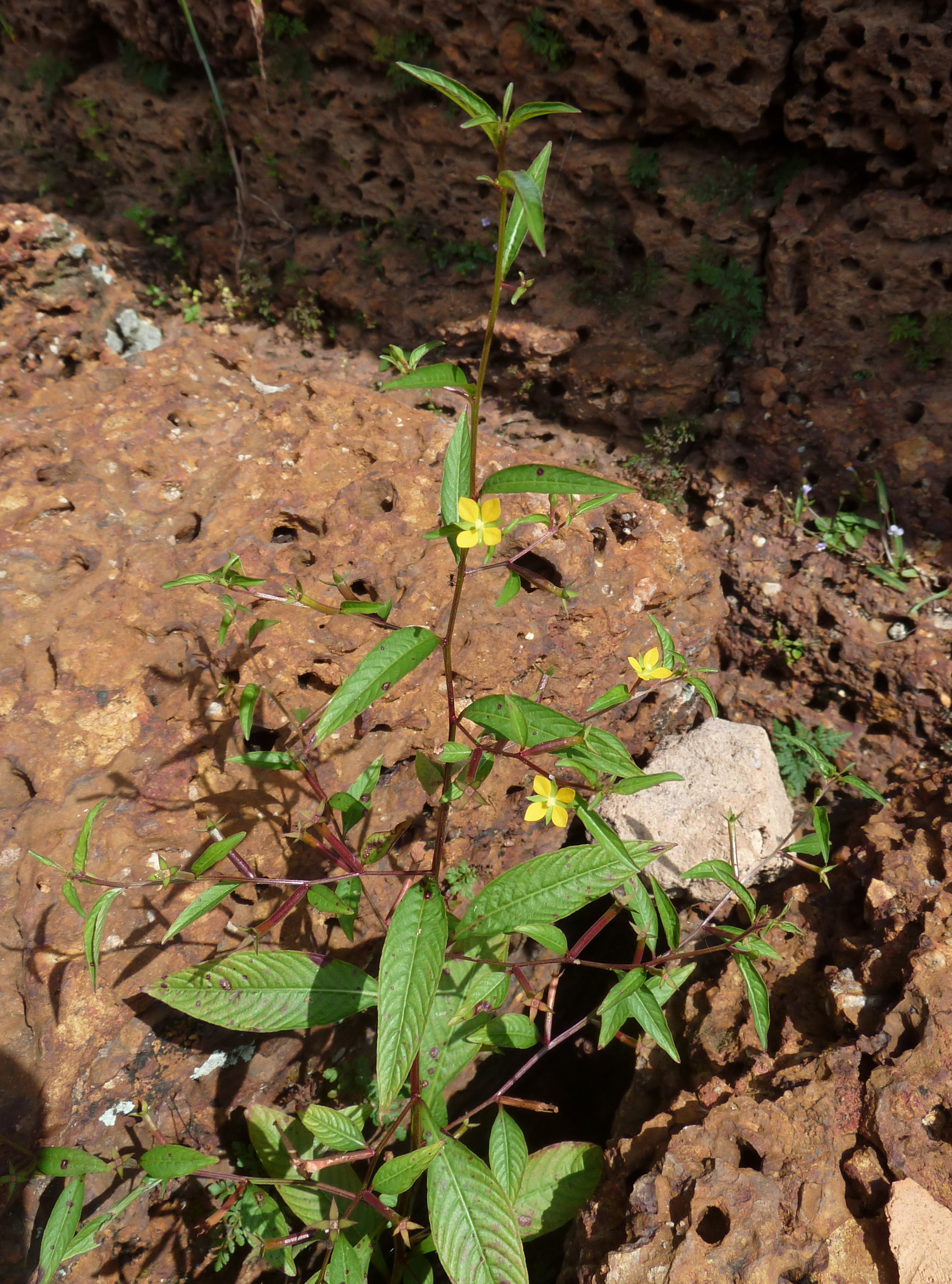
- Stem may be green or purple.
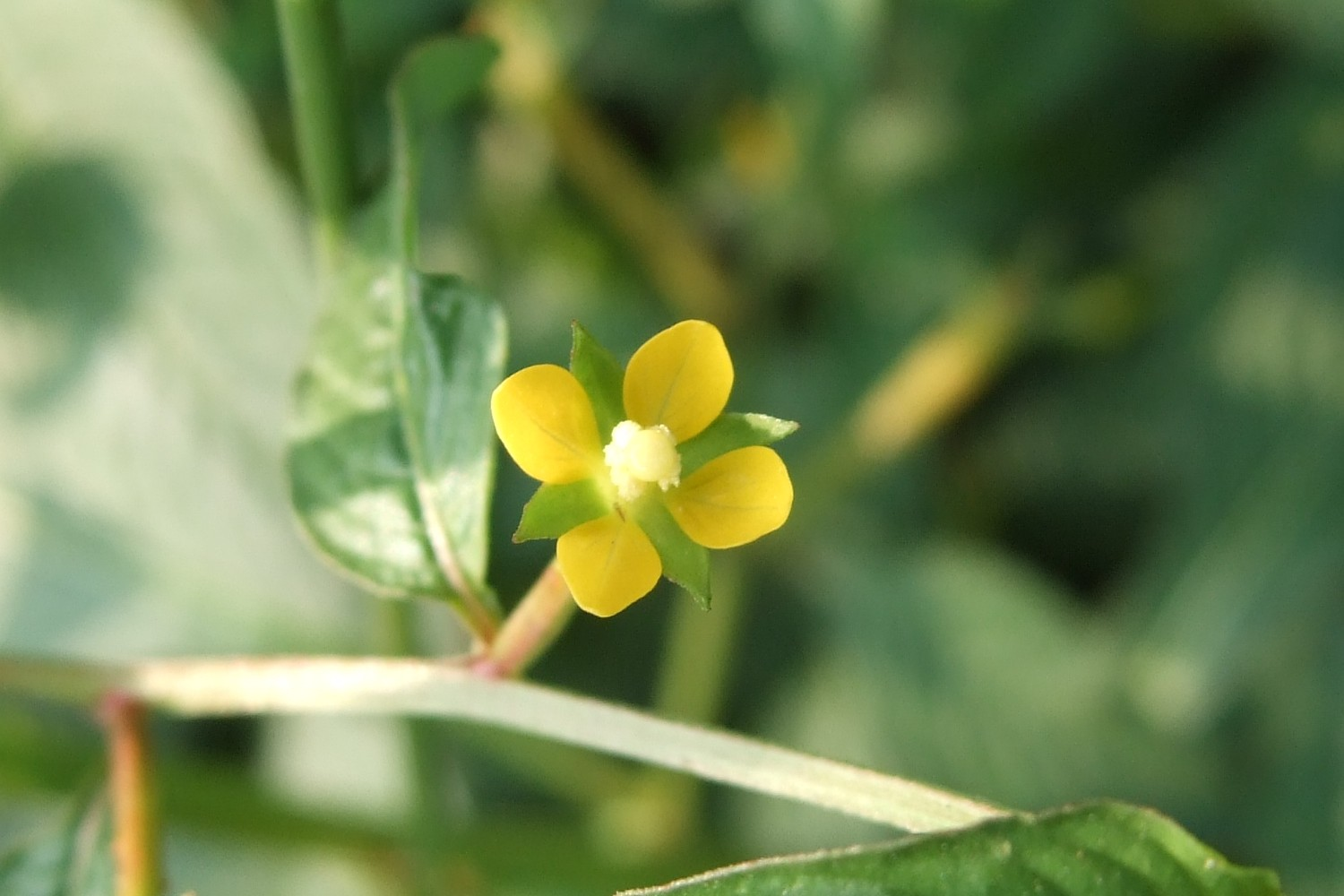
- Flower

Scientific classification
- Kingdom: Plantae
- Clade: Embryophytes
- Clade: Tracheophytes
- Clade: Angiosperms
- Clade: Eudicots
- Clade: Rosids
- Order: Myrtales
- Family: Onagraceae
- Genus: Ludwigia
- Species: L. hyssopifolia

Binomial name
- Ludwigia hyssopifolia (G.Don) Exell

Synonyms
- List: Fissendocarpa linifolia (Vahl) Bennet; Jussiaea fissendocarpa Haines; Jussiaea hyssopifolia G.Don; Jussiaea linifolia Vahl; Jussiaea micrantha Kunze; Jussiaea weddelii Micheli; Ludwigia linifolia (Vahl) R.S.Rao; Ludwigia micrantha (Kunze) H.Hara

= Ludwigia hyssopifolia =

Species of flowering plant

Ludwigia hyssopifolia, called seedbox and linear leaf water primrose, is a species of flowering plant in the genus Ludwigia, native to the New World Tropics and widely introduced to the rest of the world's tropics. A serious weed of rice paddies, a single plant can produce 250,000 seeds.
