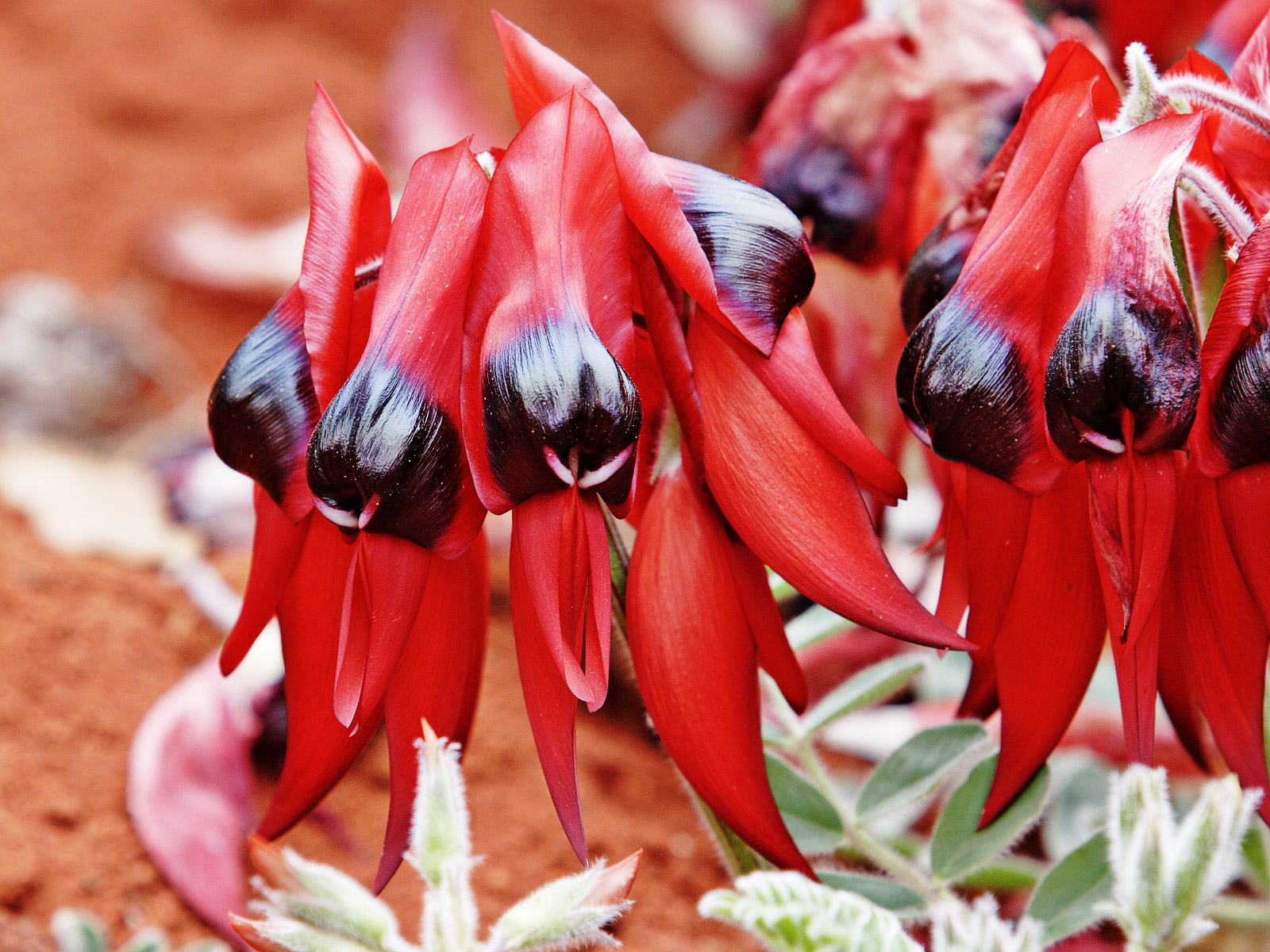
- Sturt's desert pea, at Melbourne Zoo

Scientific classification
- Kingdom: Plantae
- Clade: Tracheophytes
- Clade: Angiosperms
- Clade: Eudicots
- Clade: Rosids
- Order: Fabales
- Family: Fabaceae
- Subfamily: Faboideae
- Genus: Swainsona
- Species: S. formosa

Binomial name
- Swainsona formosa (G. Don) Joy Thomps.

Synonyms
- List: Clianthus dampieri A.Cunn. ex Lindl. nom. illeg.; Clianthus formosus (G.Don) Ford & Vickery; Clianthus speciosus var. typicus Domin not validly publ.; Donia formosa G.Don; Willdampia formosa (G.Don) A.S.George; Clianthus dampieri var. marginatus Dombrain; Clianthus dampieri var. marginatus Wickham nom. illeg.; Clianthus dampieri var. tricolor Anon.; Clianthus oxleyi A.Cunn. ex Lindl. nom. illeg.; Clianthus speciosus (G.Don) Asch. & Graebn. nom. illeg.; Clianthus speciosus subsp. marginatus (Dombrain) Asch. & Graebn.; Clianthus speciosus var. oxleyi (A.Cunn. ex Lindl.) Domin; Colutea novae-hollandiae Walp.; Donia speciosa G.Don; Kennedia speciosa A.Cunn. nom. subnud.; Swainsona atrococcinea Carrière

= Swainsona formosa =

Sturt's desert pea

Species of plant

Swainsona formosa, commonly known as Sturt's desert pea or Sturt pea, is a species of flowering plant in the family Fabaceae and is native to the Northern Territory and all continental states of Australia, with the exception of Victoria. It is a prostrate annual or short lived perennial herb with imparipinnate leaves with about 15 elliptic to egg-shaped leaflets with the narrower end towards the base, and presents two to six racemes of usually red flowers.

== Description ==
Swainsona formosa is a prostrate annual or short lived perennial herb, with several densely softly-hairy stems mostly 4–8 mm (0.16–0.31 in) wide. The leaves are mostly 100–150 mm (3.9–5.9 in) long with about 15 elliptic to egg-shaped leaflets 100–300 mm (3.9–11.8 in) long and 5–12 mm (0.20–0.47 in) wide, the end leaflet slightly longer. There are broad, densely hairy stipules, sometimes 15 mm (0.59 in) or more at the base of the petiole.

The flowers are borne in racemes about 100–150 mm (3.9–5.9 in) long with 2 to 6 usually red flowers, sometimes white or other colours, on a peduncle 50–150 mm (2.0–5.9 in) long, each flower on a shaggy-hairy pedicel 5–20 mm (0.20–0.79 in) long. The sepals are joined at the base, forming a bell-shaped tube 5–6 mm (0.20–0.24 in) long with narrowly egg-shaped lobes with thread-like tips, the lobes twice as long as the tube. The standard petal is 40–60 mm (1.6–2.4 in) long and very narrow, the base domed into a usually black, shiny boss. The wings are 35–40 mm (1.4–1.6 in) long, tapering to a narrow point, and the keel 50–60 mm (2.0–2.4 in) long and 12–15 mm (0.47–0.59 in) deep with a narrow tip. Flowering occurs from June to October, and the fruit is a hairy pod or follicle 40–90 mm (1.6–3.5 in) long, 10–12 mm (0.39–0.47 in) wide and round in cross-section, with a stalk 5–15 mm (0.20–0.59 in) long and the remains of the style about 30–40 mm (1.2–1.6 in) long.

Most forms of the plant are low-growing or prostrate, however in the Pilbara region of north-western Australia varieties growing as tall as 2 metres have been observed.

== Taxonomy and naming ==
Specimens of Sturt's desert pea were first collected by William Dampier who recorded his first sighting on 22 August 1699 on Rosemary Island. These specimens are today in the Fielding-Druce Herbarium at the University of Oxford in England.

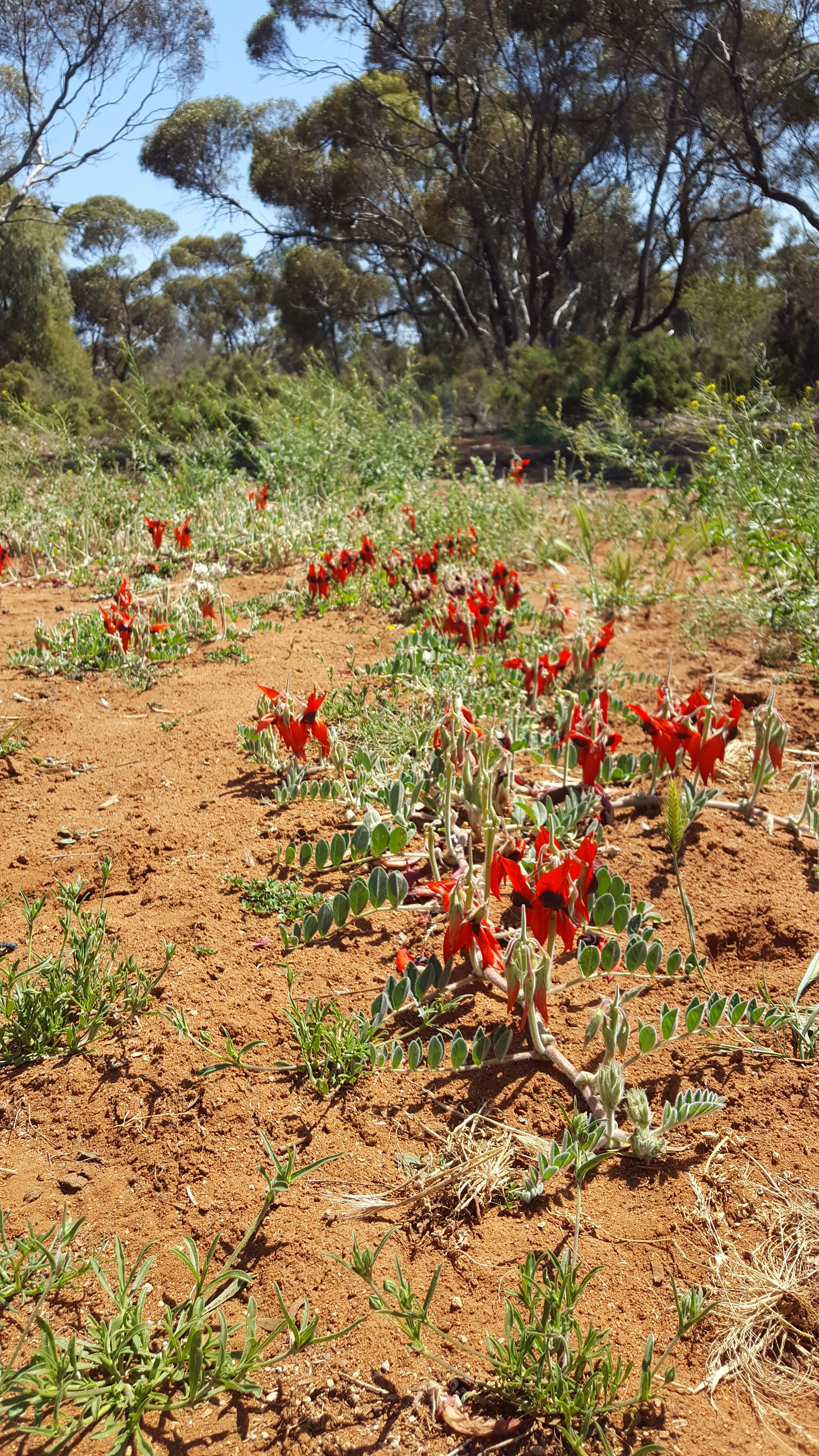
Sturt's Desert Peas at The Australian Inland Botanic Gardens.

The first formal description of the species was in 1832 by George Don, who gave it the name Donia formosa in his A General History of the Dichlamydeous Plants. In 1835, John Lindley transferred the species to Clianthus as C. dampieri, but that name was illegitimate because there was no formal description of the genus. In 1950, Neridah Clifton Ford and Joyce Winifred Vickery transferred Don's Donia formosa to Clianthus as C. formosus in Contributions from the New South Wales National Herbarium, with a description of the genus, the type species endemic to New Zealand. In 1990, Joy Thompson transferred the species to Swainsona as S. formosa, and the name is accepted by both Plants of the World Online and the Australian Plant Census. The specific epithet (formosa) means "finely formed", "handsome" or "beautiful".

In 1999, Alex George proposed to transfer the species to the monotypic genus Willdampia, but the move was not accepted.

== Distribution and habitat ==
Sturt's desert pea is widespread in arid parts of inland Australia, including in Western Australia, South Australia, the southern parts of the Northern Territory, western parts of New South Wales and in Queensland. It grows in red sandy or loamy soils in mulga woodland, near creek lines and on stony hills, sometimes in woodland and open plains.

== Common names ==
The first recorded uses of common names for Swainsona formosa (Author/publication and year of first use).:

showy donia (G. Don, 1832)
beautiful donia (G. Don, 1832)
Dampier's clianth (Veitch, 1850)
Dampier's clianthus (Hooker, 1858)
Sturt's pea (Adelaide Advertiser, 1858)
Sturt pea (de Mole, 1861)
Captain Sturt's desert pea (Aspinall, 1862)
desert pea (Anon., 1864)
Sturt's desert pea (Tenison-Woods, 1865)
glory flower (Bailey, 1883)
glory pea (Bailey, 1883)
Sturt's glory pea (Anon., 1886)
lobster claws (The Garden, 1890)
blood flower (Parker, 1898)
Dampier's glory pea (Guilfoyle, 1911)
Australian glory pea (Guilfoyle, 1911)
Dampier pea (Harris, 1980)

It is well adapted to life as a desert plant. The small seeds have a long viability, and can germinate after many years. Seeds have a hard seed coat, which protects them from harsh arid environments until the next rainfall, but inhibits germination in normal domestic environments. Growers can overcome this dormancy either by nicking the seed coat away from the 'eye' of the seed, by rubbing the seed gently between pieces of sandpaper, or by placing the seed in hot (just off-boiling) water and leaving it to soak overnight.

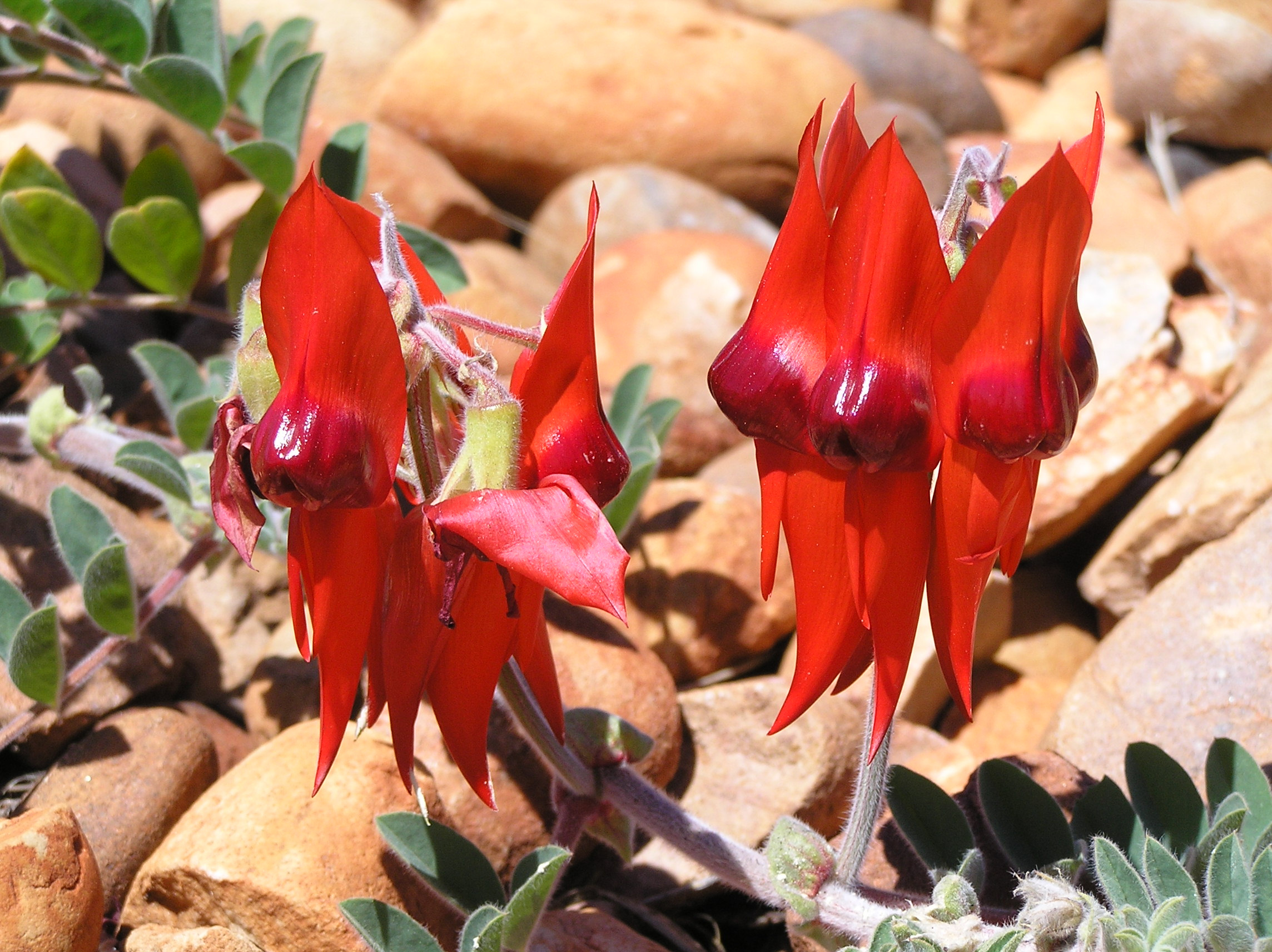
Sturt's Desert Pea, at Uluru (Ayers Rock), Australia

== Ecology ==
Flowers are bird-pollinated in the wild.

== Use as emblem and icon ==
Sturt's desert pea (described as Clianthus formosus) was adopted as the floral emblem of the state of South Australia on 23 November 1961. Its iconic status in Australia, and especially in South Australia, has ensured its use as a popular subject in artwork and photography. It appears in the logos of the Outback Communities Authority and the National Parks and Wildlife Service, South Australia together with the associated volunteer umbrella organisation, Friends of Parks. Sturt's Desert Pea has also made many appearances in prose and verse, as well as featuring in some Aboriginal legends.

Sturt's desert pea has appeared in several releases of Australian postage stamps depicting Australian floral emblems issued in 1968, 1971 and 2005. The flower also features on the logo of Charles Sturt University, which is also named after the explorer.
