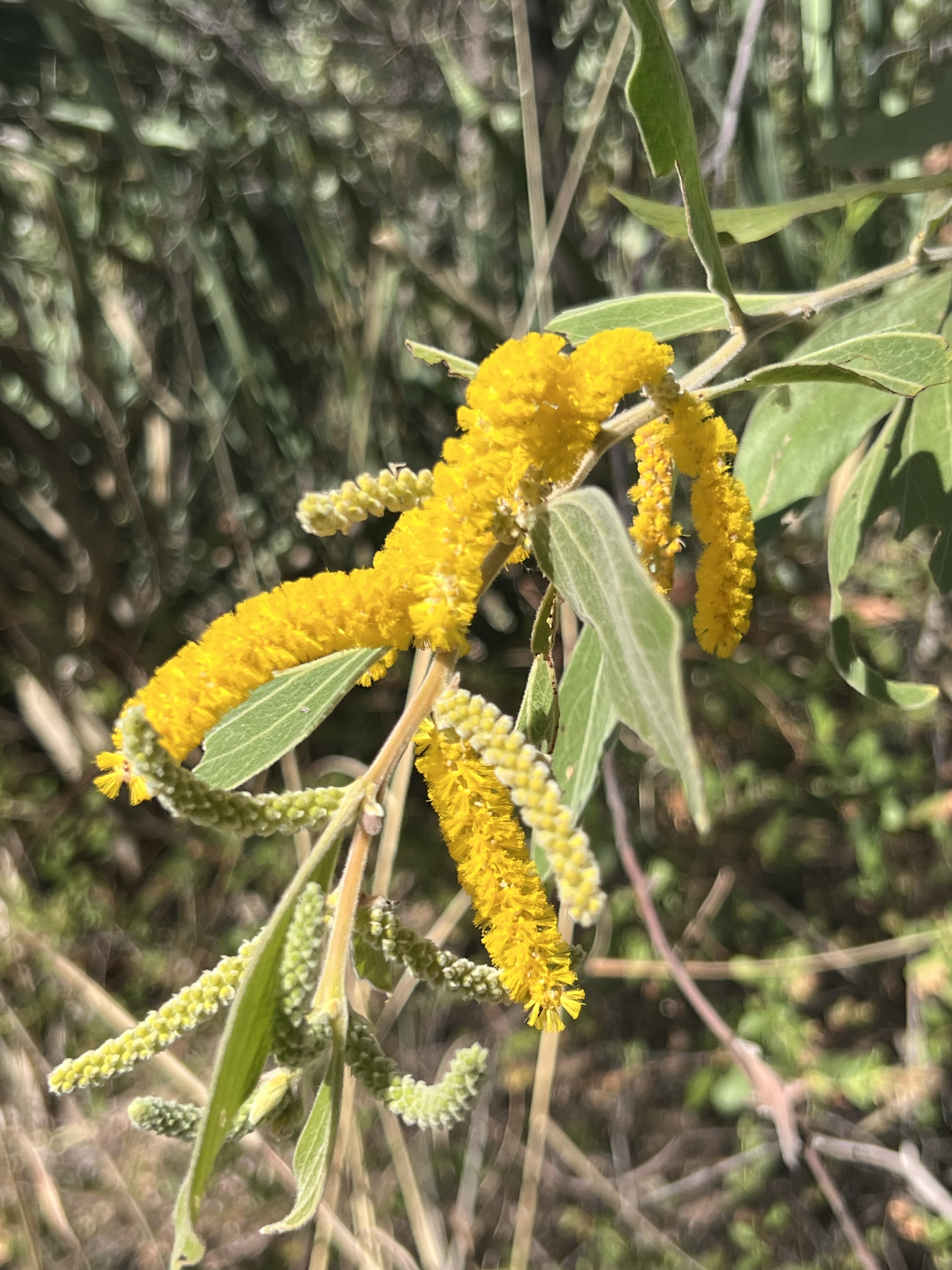

Scientific classification
- Kingdom: Plantae
- Clade: Tracheophytes
- Clade: Angiosperms
- Clade: Eudicots
- Clade: Rosids
- Order: Fabales
- Family: Fabaceae
- Subfamily: Caesalpinioideae
- Clade: Mimosoid clade
- Genus: Acacia
- Species: A. holosericea

Binomial name
- Acacia holosericea A.Cunn. ex G.Don
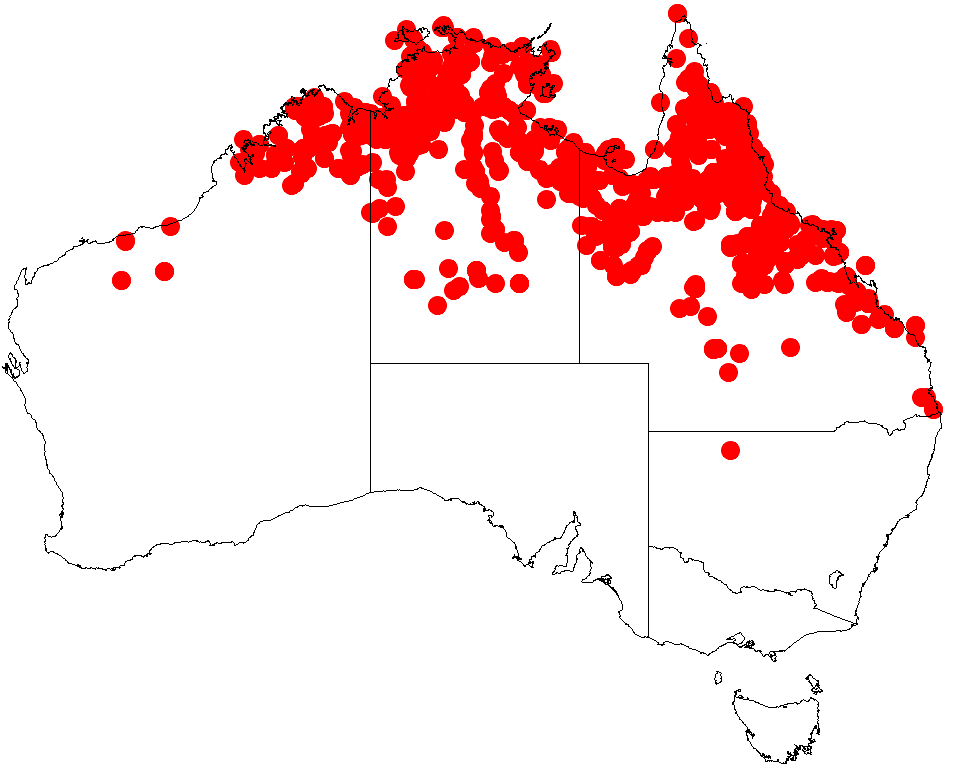
- Occurrence data from AVH

Synonyms
- Acacia holosericea var. glabrata Maiden; Acacia holosericea A.Cunn. ex G.Don var. holosericea; Acacia holosericea var. multispirea Domin; Acacia holosericea var. typica Domin nom. inval.; Acacia mangium var. holosericea (A.Cunn. ex G.Don) C.T.White; Racosperma holosericeum (G.Don) Pedley; Racosperma holosericeum var. glabratum (Maiden) Pedley; Racosperma holosericeum (G.Don) Pedley var. holosericeum

= Acacia holosericea =

Strap wattle

Species of shrub

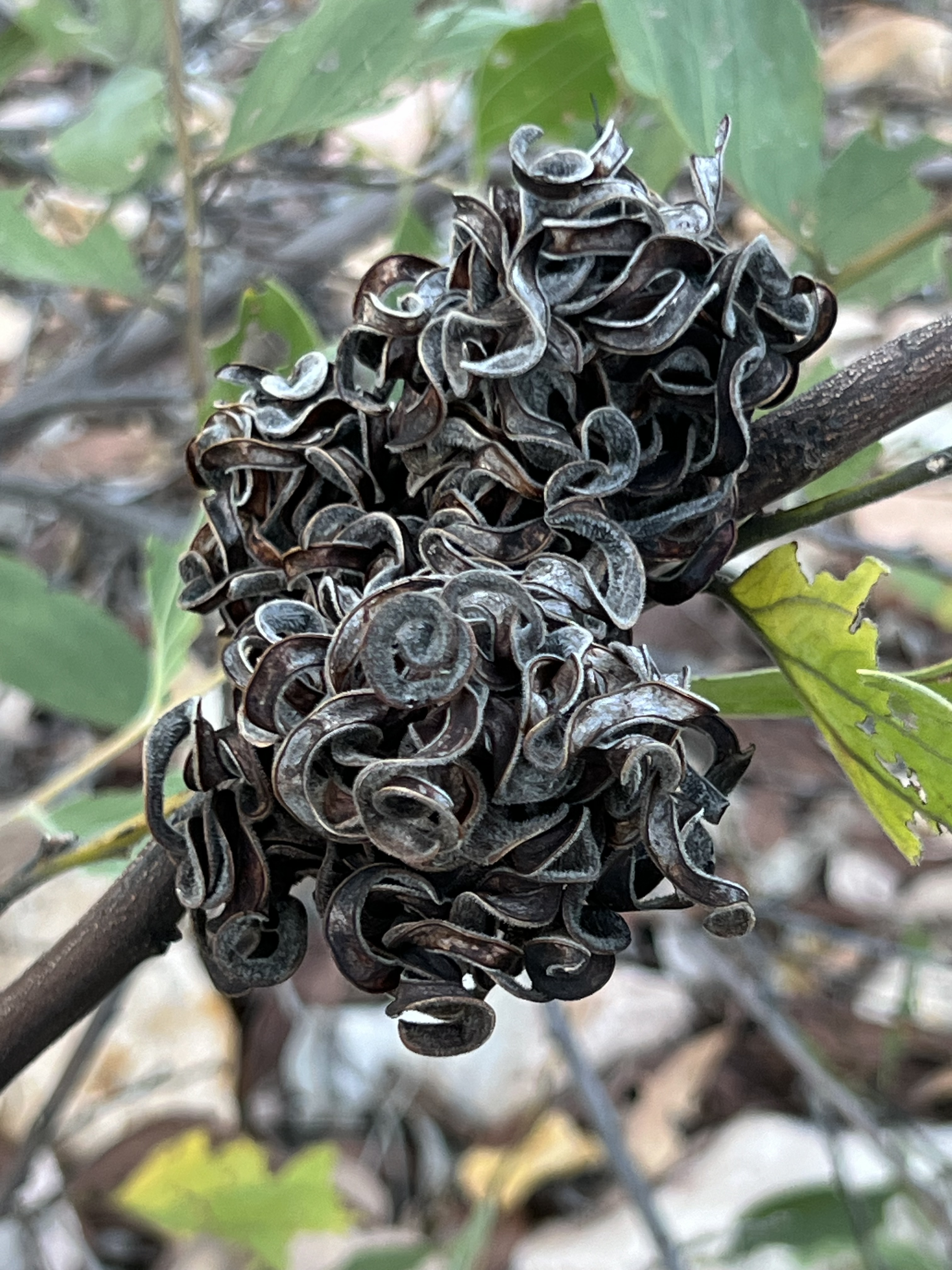
Pods

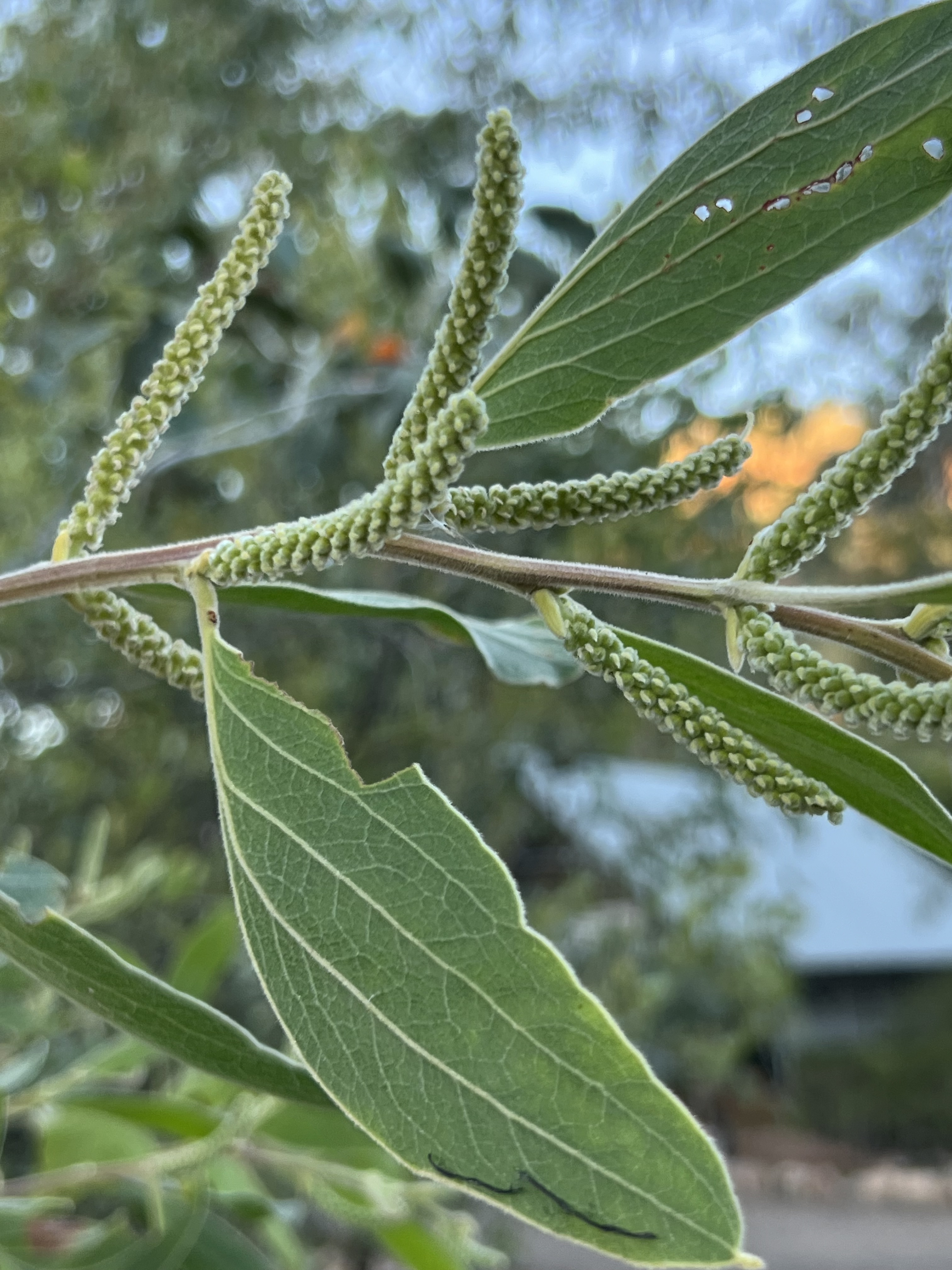
Foliage and buds

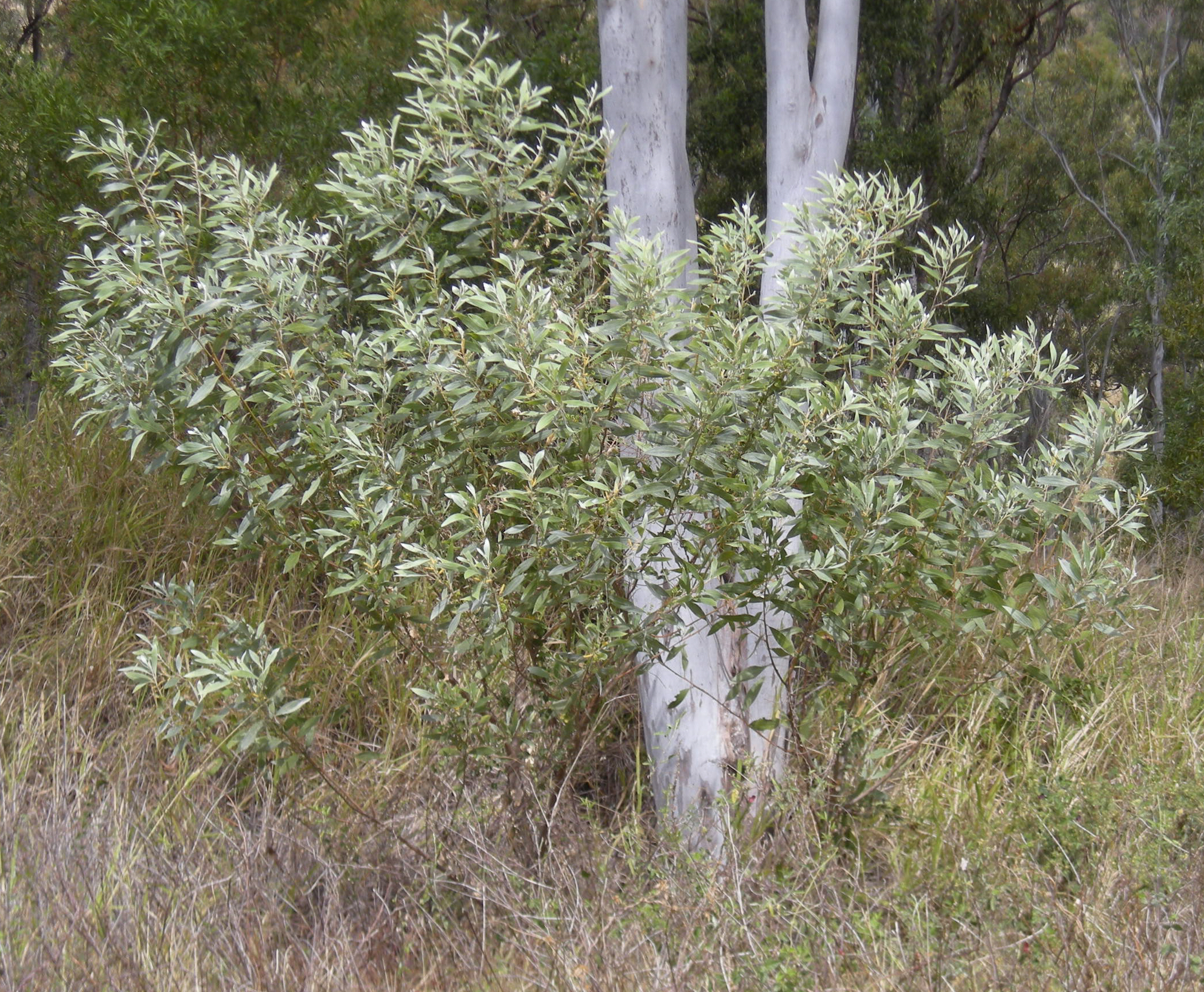
Habit

Acacia holosericea, commonly known as candelabra wattle, soapbush, silver wattle, silver-leaved wattle and silky wattle is a species of flowering plant in the family Fabaceae and is endemic to tropical northern Australia. It is a shrub or tree with narrowly elliptic phyllodes, spikes of golden yellow flowers and tightly and sometimes irregularly coiled pods that remain as entangled clumps after the seeds have been released.

== Description ==
Acacia holosericea is a shrub or tree that typically grows to 3–8 m (9.8–26.2 ft) high and 4 m (13 ft) wide, and has branchlets and young shoots covered with silvery, silky hairs, or sometimes glabraous. Its phyllodes are obliquely narrowly elliptic, 100–200 mm (3.9–7.9 in) long, 20–50 mm (0.79–1.97 in) wide and usually covered with silky hairs, usually with three to four prominent veins. The flowers are golden yellow and borne in rod-like spikes 20–40 mm (0.79–1.57 in) long on a peduncle 3–7 mm (0.12–0.28 in) long. The pods are tightly and somewhat irregularly coiled, 2.5–4 mm (0.098–0.157 in) wide, thinly crusty to leathery and more or less glabrous, remaining as entangled clumps after the seeds have been released. The seeds are oblong, 3.5 mm (0.14 in) long, shiny dark brown with a bright yellow aril.

== Taxonomy ==
Acacia holosericea was first formally described in 1832 by George Don in his book A General History of Dichlamydeous Plants from an unpublished manuscript by Allan Cunningham. In 1978, Leslie Pedley nominated the specimens collected by Cunningham at Port Keats on the Cambridge Gulf as the lectotype. The specific epithet (holosericea) means 'entirely silky'.

== Distribution and habitat ==
Candelabra wattle is widespread in northern Australia extending from Derby in Western Australia, east across the Northern Territory to near Rockhampton in eastern Queensland. Smaller populations are found in arid regions of the Pilbara in the Hamersley Range, in central parts of the Northern Territory and in south-western Queensland near Blackall. It is found in and around ephemeral watercourses growing in gravelly sand or loamy soils.

== Conservation status ==
Acacia holosericea is listed as "not threatened" by the Western Australian Government Department of Biodiversity, Conservation and Attractions, as of "least concern" under the Northern Territory Territory Parks and Wildlife Conservation Act and the Queensland Government Nature Conservation Act 1992.

== Use in horticulture ==
This species of wattle can be grown by seed, although the seeds must be scarified prior to planting. It grows quickly and well in a sunny, reasonably well drained position in most soil types. It is suitable as a feature plant or as a hedge or screen plant. It has attractive foliage and fruit, and can be grown in tropical areas.

== Uses ==
Indigenous Australians used the plant as a fish poison. The seeds of the plant are known to be edible.

== See also ==
- List of Acacia species
