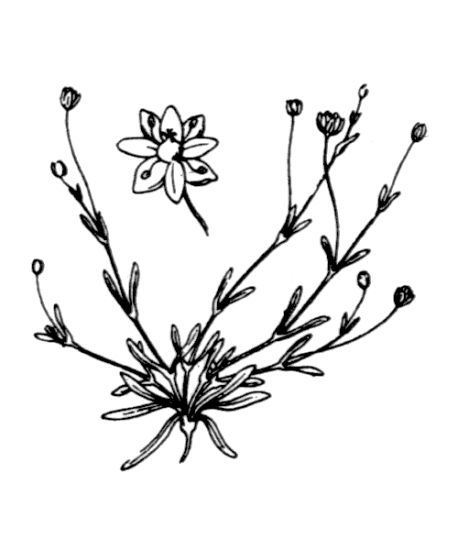

Scientific classification
- Kingdom: Plantae
- Clade: Tracheophytes
- Clade: Angiosperms
- Clade: Eudicots
- Order: Caryophyllales
- Family: Caryophyllaceae
- Genus: Sagina
- Species: S. maritima

Binomial name
- Sagina maritima Don

= Sagina maritima =

Species of flowering plant

Sagina maritima is a species of flowering plant in the family Caryophyllaceae known by the common name sea pearlwort. It is found throughout Europe, Southwest Asia, North Africa, the Canary Islands and the Azores.

== Gallery ==
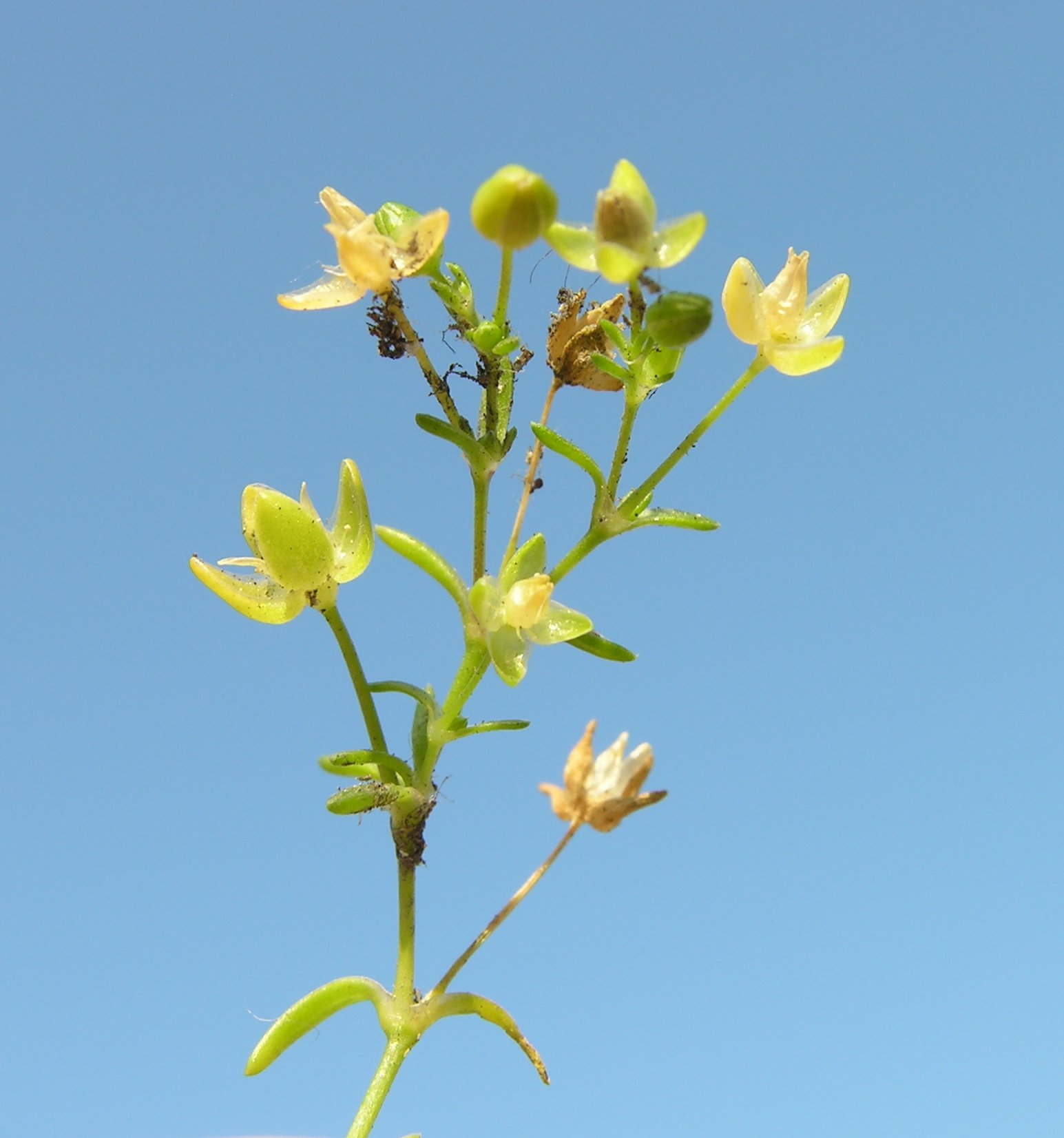
Inflorescence

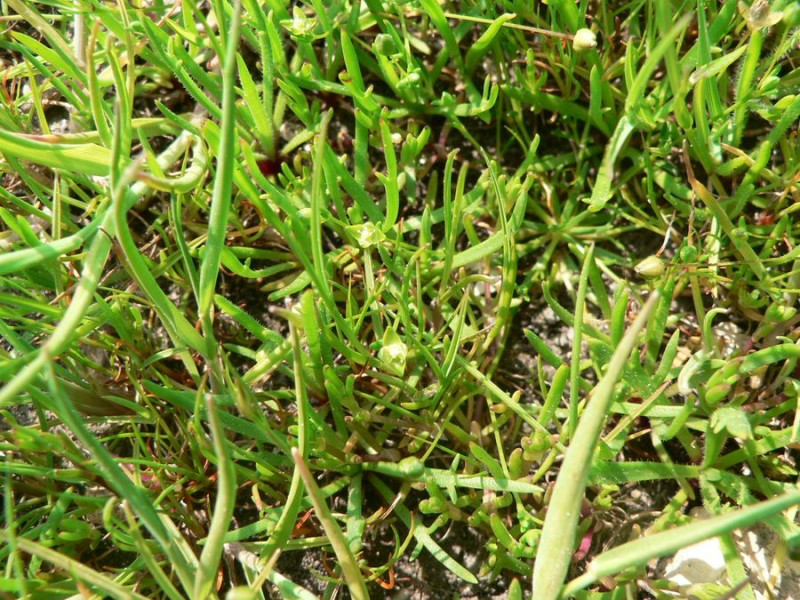
Plant

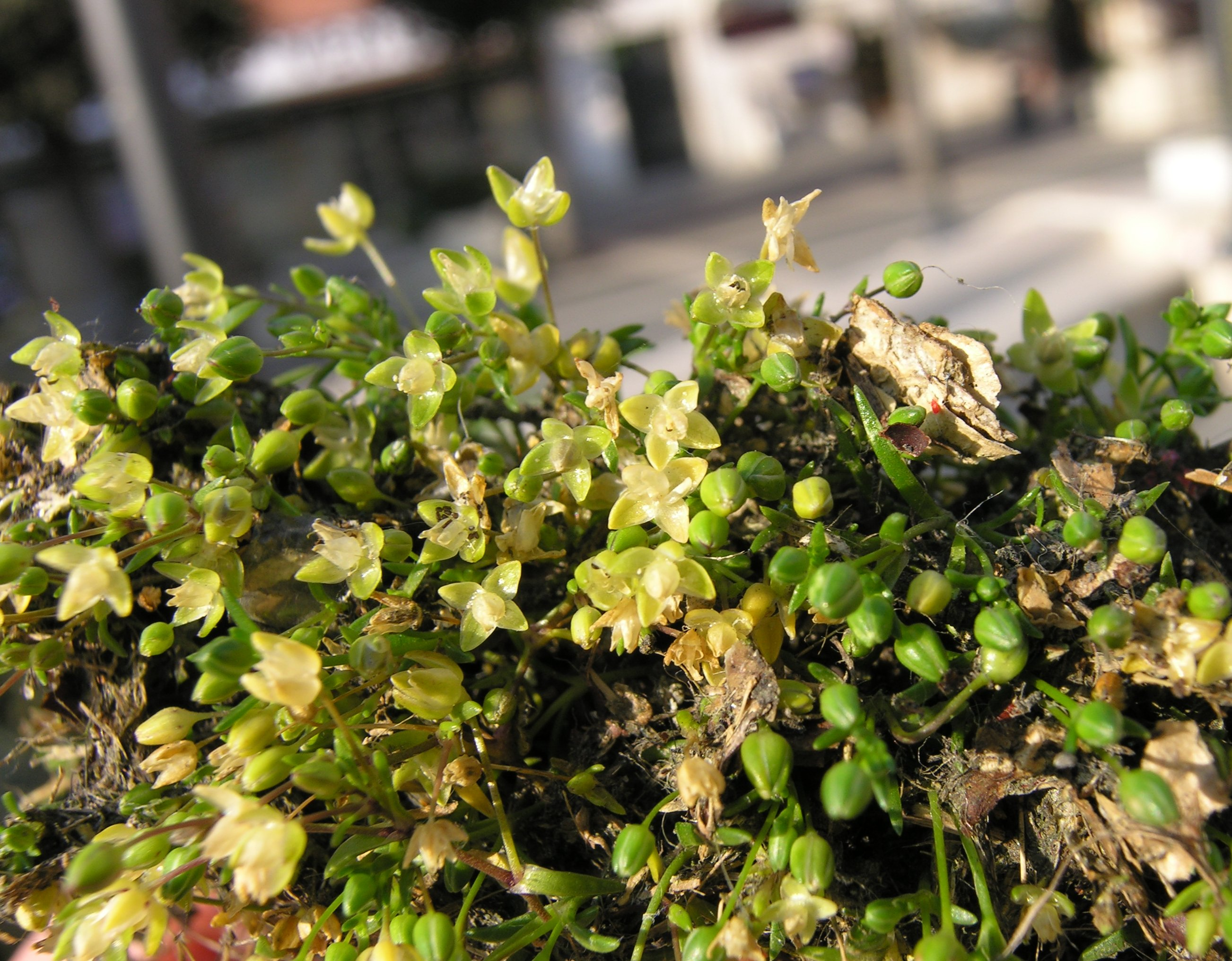
Plant
