= George Don =

Scottish botanist (1798–1856)

- Born: 29 April 1798; Doo Hillock, Forfar, Angus, Scotland
- Died: 25 February 1856 (aged 57); Kensington, London, England
- Known for: A General System of Gardening and Botany
- Parent(s): Caroline Clementina Stuart and George Don
- Relatives: David Don (brother)
- Scientific career
- Fields: Botany
- Institutions: Royal Horticultural Society
- Author abbrev. (botany): G.Don

George Don (29 April 1798 – 25 February 1856) was a Scottish botanist and plant collector.

== Life and career ==
George Don was born at Doo Hillock, Forfar, Angus, Scotland on 29 April 1798 to Caroline Clementina Stuart and George Don (b.1756), principal gardener of the Royal Botanic Garden Edinburgh in 1802. Don was the elder brother of David Don, also a botanist. He became foreman of the gardens at Chelsea in 1816. In 1821, he was sent to Brazil, the West Indies and Sierra Leone to collect specimens for the Royal Horticultural Society. Most of his discoveries were published by Joseph Sabine, although Don published several new species from Sierra Leone.

Don's main work was his four volume A General System of Gardening and Botany, published between 1832 and 1838 (often referred to as Gen. Hist., an abbreviation of the alternative title: A General History of the Dichlamydeous Plants). He revised the first supplement to Loudon's Encyclopaedia of Plants, and provided a Linnean arrangement to Loudon's Hortus Britannicus. He also wrote a monograph on the genus Allium (1832) and a review of Combretum. He died at Kensington, London, on 25 February 1856. He is buried in the parish churchyard in the centre of Forfar.

== Legacy ==
The plant species authored by George Don include:

- Acacia cyclops G.Don
  Coastal Wattle
- Acacia deltoidea G.Don
- Acacia holosericea G.Don
  Candelbra Wattle
- Acacia pendula A.Cunn. ex G.Don
  Weeping myall, Boree
- Acacia podalyriifolia G.Don
- Acacia rigens G.Don
  Nealie
- Bidens reptans G.Don
- Catharanthus roseus (L.) G.Don
  Pink Periwinkle
- Daviesia physodes G.Don
- Hoya latifolia G.Don
- Isotoma scapigera (R.Br.) G.Don
  Long-scaped Isotome
- Lagunaria patersonia (Andrews) G.Don
- Ludwigia hyssopifolia (G.Don) Exell
- Modiola caroliniana (L.) G.Don
- Physochlaina orientalis (M.Bieb.) G.Don
- Psittacanthus calyculatus (DC.) G.Don
- Sagina maritima G.Don
- Sphenotoma squarrosum (R.Br.) G.Don
- Swainsona formosa (G.Don) Joy Thomps.
- Viola pedatifida G.Don
  Prairie violet

A plant genera authored by George Don is Physochlaina G.Don

He is also honoured in the genus of a plant, Donella, which was published in Hist. Pl. Vol.11 o page 294 in 1891.

The television gardener Monty Don is, according to different sources, either George Don's four-times great-grandson or a great-nephew some generations removed.

== List of selected publications ==
- Don, George (1832). "A monograph of the genus Allium". Memoirs of the Wernerian Natural History Society. 6: 1–102.
- — (1831). A general history of the dichlamydeous plants: comprising complete descriptions of the different orders...the whole arranged according to the natural system IV vols. London: J.G. and F. Rivington.
- A general system of gardening and botany. Founded upon Miller's Gardener's dictionary, and arranged according to the natural system. 1831–1838
- Biography of The Scottish Botanist George Don 1764–1814, His Life, Times, and Contemporaries, by Scottish Author Marilyn Reid, https://www.amazon.co.uk/Scottish-Botanist-George-Don-1764-1814/dp/1492192619

== See also ==
- List of Australian plant species authored by George Don

== Bibliography ==
- Hall, Norman (1978). Botanists of the Eucalypts. CSIRO, Melbourne. ISBN 0-643-00271-5.
