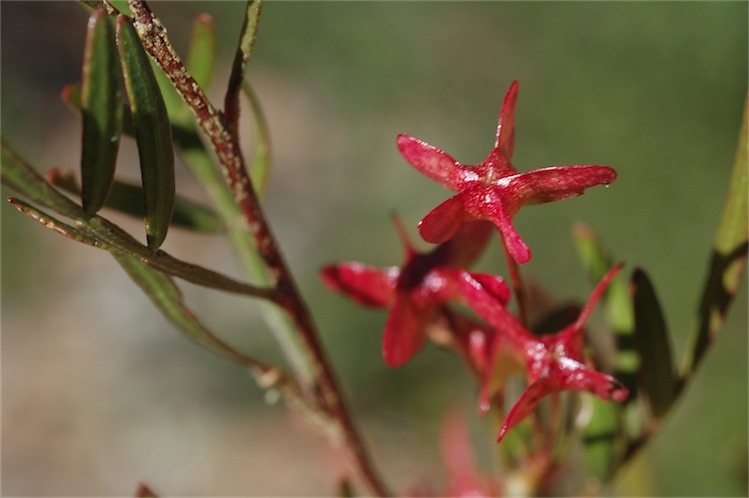
- In Goobang National Park

Scientific classification
- Kingdom: Plantae
- Clade: Tracheophytes
- Clade: Angiosperms
- Clade: Eudicots
- Clade: Rosids
- Order: Sapindales
- Family: Sapindaceae
- Genus: Dodonaea
- Species: D. heteromorpha

Binomial name
- Dodonaea heteromorpha J.G.West

Synonyms
- Dodonaea truncatiales var. heterophylla Maiden & Betche

= Dodonaea heteromorpha =

Species of shrub

Dodonaea heteromorpha is a species of plant in the family Sapindaceae and is endemic to eastern Australia. It is an erect shrub usually with simple, more or less linear leaves, flowers arranged in cymes, each flower with eight stamens, and 4-winged capsules.

== Description ==
Dodonaea heteromorpha is an erect shrub that typically grows to a height of up to 3 m (9.8 ft). Its leaves are simple, glabrous, sessile, more or less linear, 35–80 mm (1.4–3.1 in) long and about 2–5 mm (0.079–0.197 in) wide, sometimes pinnate with up to 10 leaflets 6–30 mm (0.24–1.18 in) long and 2–3 mm (0.079–0.118 in) wide. The flowers are borne in cymes, each flower on a pedicel 3.5–10 mm (0.14–0.39 in) long with four egg-shaped sepals, 1.5–2.3 mm (0.059–0.091 in) long but that fall off as the flowers mature. Each flower has eight stamens and a glabrous ovary. The fruit is a four-winged, capsule 5.0–6.5 mm (0.20–0.26 in) long and 15–25 mm (0.59–0.98 in) wide, the wings membranous or sometimes leathery, 6.5–10 mm (0.26–0.39 in) wide.

== Taxonomy and naming ==
This species was first formally described in 1905 by Joseph Maiden and Ernst Betche who gave it the name Dodonaea truncatiales var. heterophylla in the Proceedings of the Linnean Society of New South Wales from specimens collected by William Woolls. In 1984, Judith Gay West raised the variety to species status as Dodonaea heteromorpha in the journal Brunonia.

== Distribution and habitat ==
Dodonaea heteromorpha grows in semi-arid areas with ironbark mallee or in open woodland mainly west of the Great Dividing Range in south-eastern Queensland and New South Wales. There are records of the species in the Grampians from 1894, but it is now presumed to be extinct in Victoria.

== Conservation status ==
Dodonaea heteromorpha is listed as of "least concern" under the Queensland Government Nature Conservation Act 1992, but as "extinct" in Victoria under the Victorian Government Flora and Fauna Guarantee Act 1988.
