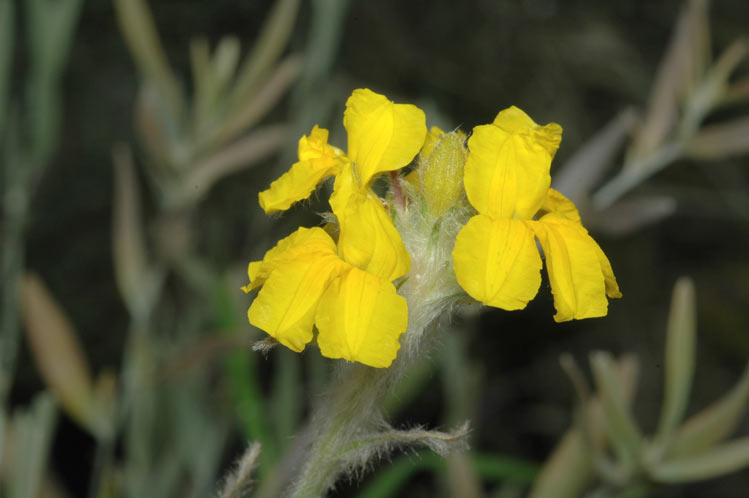
- In the ANBG

Scientific classification
- Kingdom: Plantae
- Clade: Tracheophytes
- Clade: Angiosperms
- Clade: Eudicots
- Clade: Asterids
- Order: Asterales
- Family: Goodeniaceae
- Genus: Goodenia
- Species: G. glomerata

Binomial name
- Goodenia glomerata Maiden & Betche

= Goodenia glomerata =

Species of flowering plant

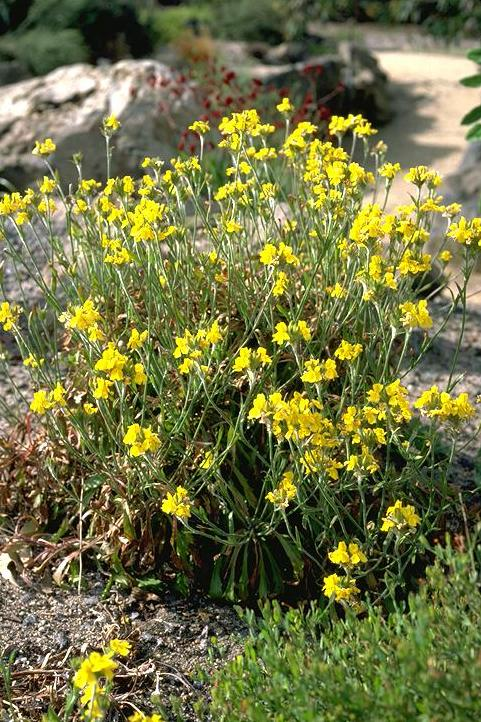
Habit

Goodenia glomerata is a species of flowering plant in the family Goodeniaceae and is endemic to the south coast of New South Wales. It is an erect, hairy herb with elliptic to lance-shaped leaves, mostly at the base of the plant, and compact spikes of hairy yellow flowers.

== Description ==
Goodenis glomerata is an erect herb that typically grows to a height of 50 cm (20 in) and has cottony yellowish to grey hairs. The leaves are mostly at the base of the plant, elliptic to lance-shaped with the narrower end towards the base, 6–200 mm (0.24–7.87 in) long and 10–22 mm (0.39–0.87 in) wide, with toothed edges. The flowers are arranged in compact spikes 120–300 mm (4.7–11.8 in) long with lance-shaped bracts 12–20 mm (0.47–0.79 in) long and bracteoles 8–15 mm (0.31–0.59 in) long. The sepals are linear to lance-shaped, 8–10 mm (0.31–0.39 in) long, the corolla yellow, 20–30 mm (0.79–1.18 in) long with cottony hairs and star-shaped hairs on the outside. The lower lobes of the corolla are 9–11 mm (0.35–0.43 in) long with wings about 2 mm (0.079 in) wide. The fruit is a cylindrical capsule 8–9 mm (0.31–0.35 in) long.

== Taxonomy ==
Goodenia glomerata was first formally described in 1900 by Joseph Maiden and Ernst Betche in the Proceedings of the Linnean Society of New South Wales.

== Distribution and habitat ==
This goodenia in swampy ground on sandstone and conglomerate from Jervis Bay to Ulladulla and inland to the Budawang Range.
