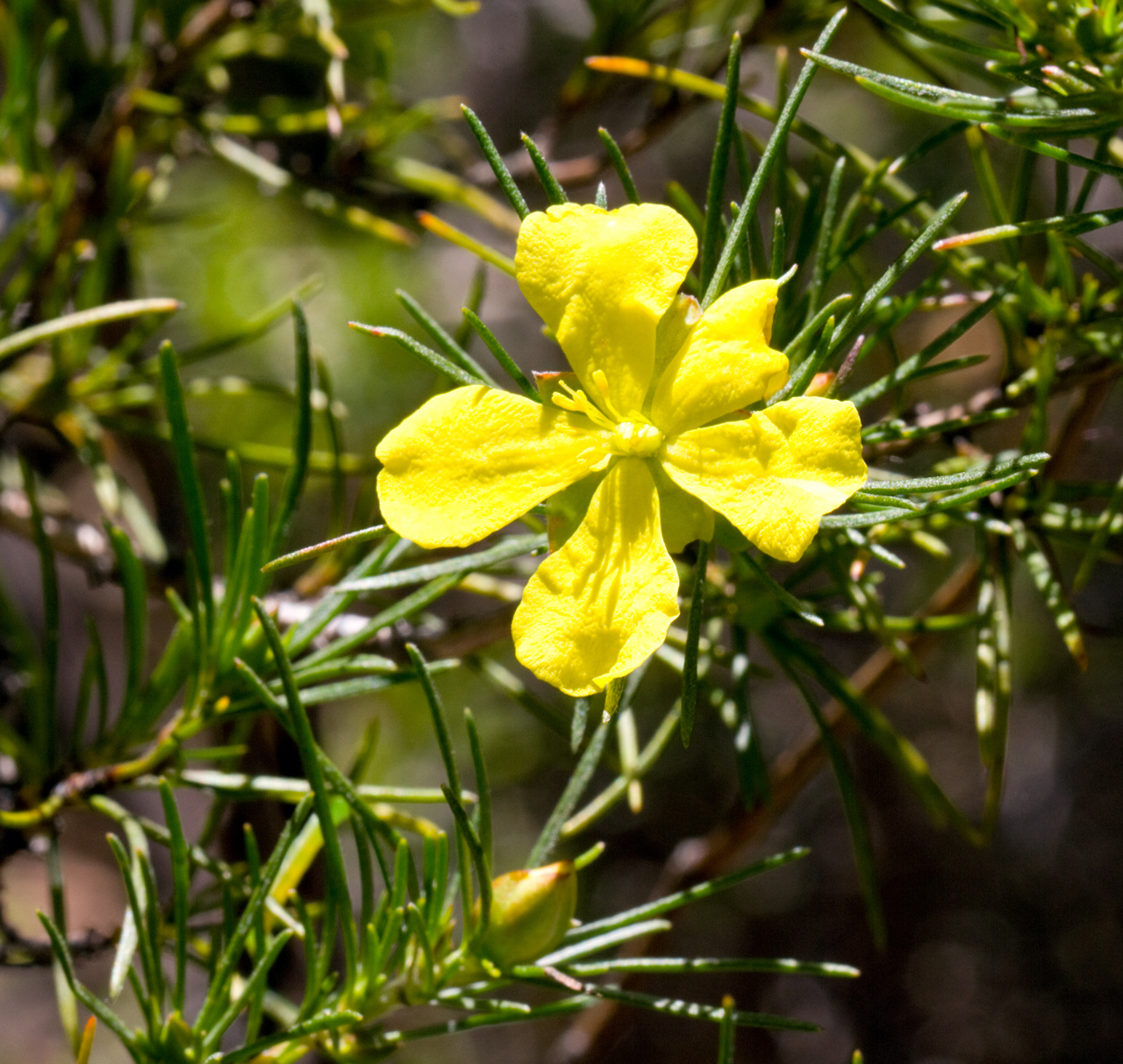
- In the Girraween National Park

Scientific classification
- Kingdom: Plantae
- Clade: Tracheophytes
- Clade: Angiosperms
- Clade: Eudicots
- Order: Dilleniales
- Family: Dilleniaceae
- Genus: Hibbertia
- Species: H. elata

Binomial name
- Hibbertia elata Maiden & Betche

= Hibbertia elata =

Species of flowering plant

Hibbertia elata is a species of flowering plant in the family Dilleniaceae and is endemic to eastern Australia. It is an open shrub with hairy stems, clustered, narrow linear to narrow lance-shaped leaves with the narrower end towards the base, and yellow flowers usually with fifteen to twenty-five stamens arranged around the three carpels.

== Description ==
Hibbertia elata is an open shrub that typically grows to a height of 1–2 m (3 ft 3 in – 6 ft 7 in), its stems usually hairy. The leaves are arranged in clusters along the stems, linear to lance-shaped with the narrower end towards the base, 10–30 mm (0.39–1.18 in) long and 1–2 mm (0.039–0.079 in) wide. The flowers are arranged on the ends of short side shoots and are sessile, with five sepals about 8 mm (0.31 in) long. The five petals are yellow, about 10 mm (0.39 in) long and there are fifteen to twenty-five stamens arranged around three glabrous carpels. Flowering occurs from summer to autumn.

== Taxonomy ==
Hibbertia elata was first formally described in 1913 by Joseph Maiden and Ernst Betche in the Proceedings of the Linnean Society of New South Wales from specimens collected near the New South Wales - Queensland border. The specific epithet (elata) means "tall".

== Distribution and habitat ==
This hibbertia grows on rocky slopes between Mudgee and Merriwa in New South Wales and near Wallangarra in Queensland.

== See also ==
- List of Hibbertia species
