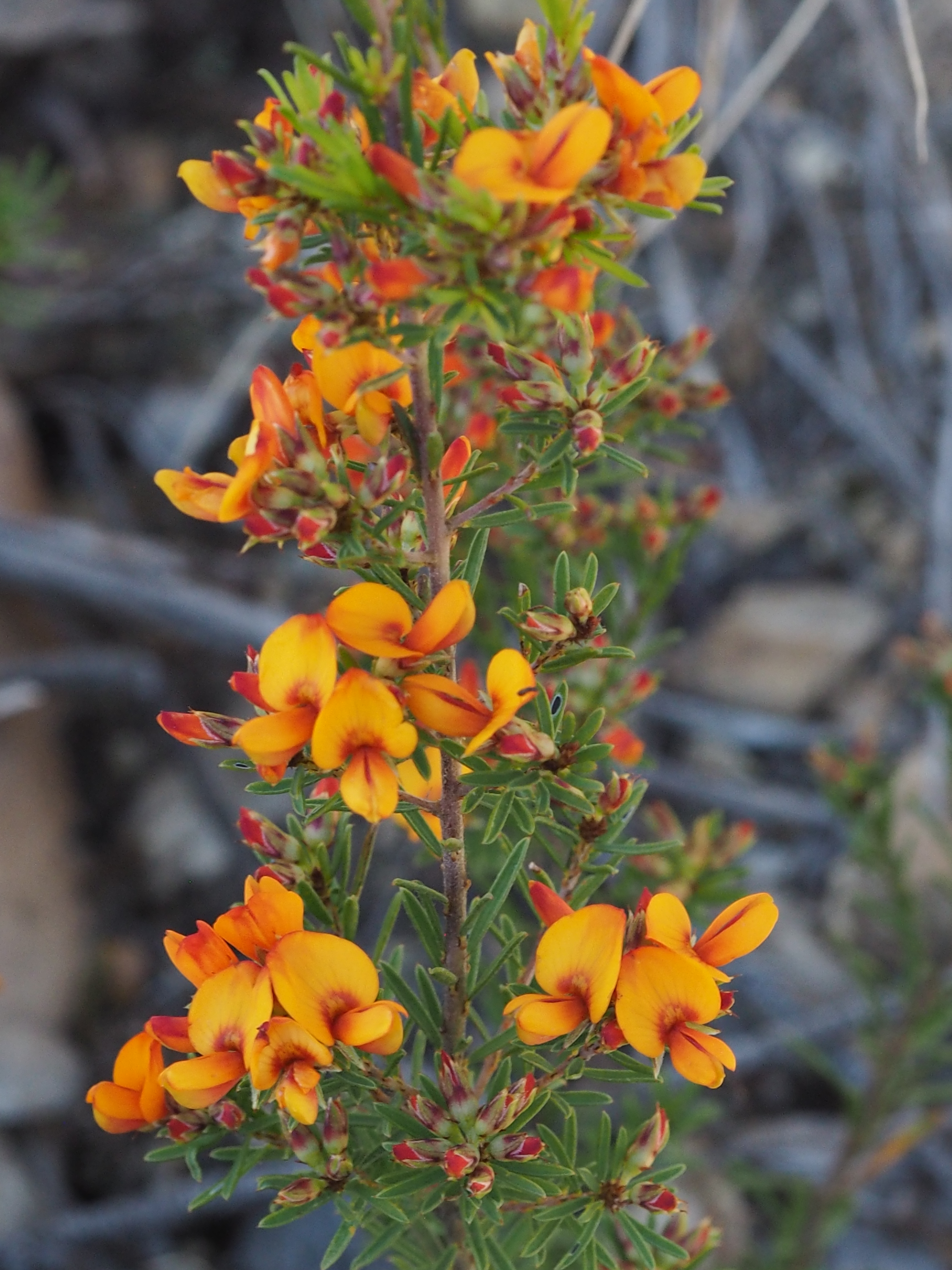
- Pultenaea campbellii

Scientific classification
- Kingdom: Plantae
- Clade: Tracheophytes
- Clade: Angiosperms
- Clade: Eudicots
- Clade: Rosids
- Order: Fabales
- Family: Fabaceae
- Subfamily: Faboideae
- Genus: Pultenaea
- Species: P. campbellii

Binomial name
- Pultenaea campbellii Maiden & Betche

= Pultenaea campbellii =

New England bush-pea

Species of flowering plant

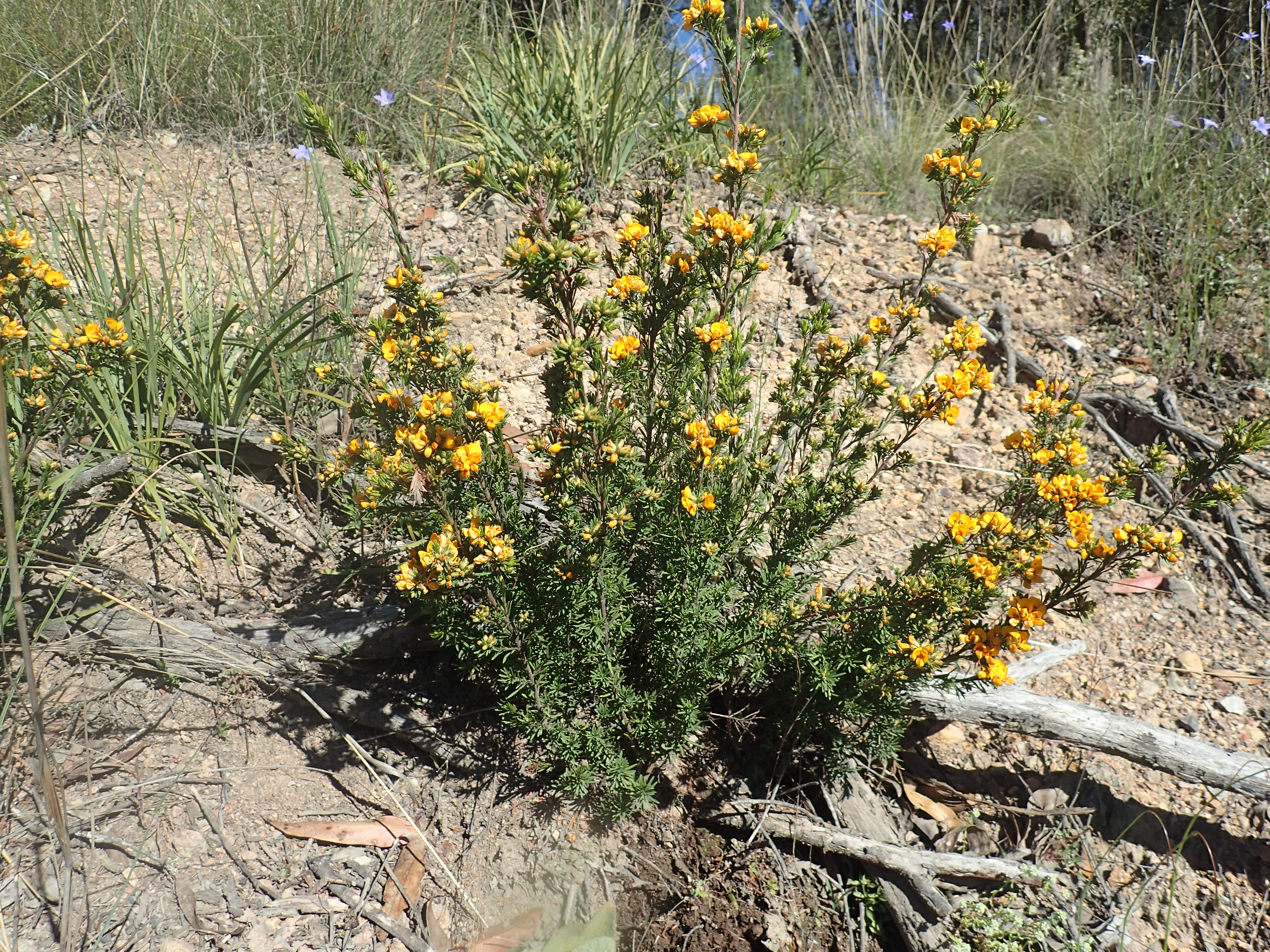
Habit near Armidale

Pultenaea campbellii commonly known as New England bush-pea or ragged bush-pea, is a species of flowering plant in the family Fabaceae and is endemic to New South Wales. It is an erect shrub with linear leaves and yellow-orange flowers arranged near the ends of branchlets.

== Description ==
Pultenaea campbellii is an erect shrub that typically grows to a height of up to 1 m (3 ft 3 in) and has stems covered with soft hairs pressed against the surface. The leaves are linear, concave, 5–10 mm (0.20–0.39 in) long and 1.0–1.5 mm (0.039–0.059 in) wide that have stipules 2–3 mm (0.079–0.118 in) long at the base and the edges rolled upwards. The flowers are borne near the ends of the branchlets in dense groups with leaves with enlarged stipules at the base of the head. The flowers are yellow-orange and 5–9 mm (0.20–0.35 in) long, each flower on a pedicel 1–2 mm (0.039–0.079 in) long with narrow egg-shaped bracteoles 1–2 mm (0.039–0.079 in) long at the base of the sepals. The sepals are 4–6 mm (0.16–0.24 in) long.

== Taxonomy and naming ==
Pultenaea campbellii was first formally described in 1899 by Joseph Maiden and Ernst Betche in Proceedings of the Linnean Society of New South Wales from specimens collected by John Fauna Campbell at "Grave-yard Creek, near Walcha" in 1898.

== Distribution and habitat ==
This pultenaea grows in forest between Glen Innes and Nundle in the New England Tableland of northern New South Wales.

== Conservation status ==
This pea was previously listed as "vulnerable" under the Australian Government Environment Protection and Biodiversity Conservation Act 1999 and the New South Wales Government Threatened Species Conservation Act 1995 but was delisted in 1999.
