= Goodenia havilandii =

Hill goodenia

Scientific classification
- Kingdom: Plantae
- Clade: Tracheophytes
- Clade: Angiosperms
- Clade: Eudicots
- Clade: Asterids
- Order: Asterales
- Family: Goodeniaceae
- Genus: Goodenia
- Species: G. havilandii

Binomial name
- Goodenia havilandii Maiden & Betche

Species of flowering plant

Goodenia havilandii, commonly known as hill goodenia, is a species of flowering plant in the family Goodeniaceae and is endemic to the drier parts of southern Australia. It is a prostrate to ascending, short-lived herb with sticky leaves and racemes of yellowish flowers with a brown centre.

== Description ==
Goodenia havilandii is a prostrate to ascending herb with stems up to 40 cm (16 in) long, densely covered with sticky glandular hairs. The leaves at the base of the plant are linear to lance-shaped, sometimes with teeth on the edges, 20–90 mm (0.79–3.54 in) long and 2–15 mm (0.079–0.591 in) wide. The flowers are arranged in racemes up to 200 mm (7.9 in) long with leaf-like bracts, each flower on a pedicel 8–15 mm (0.31–0.59 in) long. The sepals are elliptic, about 1.5 mm (0.059 in) long, the corolla yellowish with a brown centre, 3–12 mm (0.12–0.47 in) long with a few hairs on the inside. The lower lobes of the corolla are 1–3 mm (0.039–0.118 in) long with wings 0.5–1 mm (0.020–0.039 in) wide. Flowering occurs in most months and the fruit is a more or less spherical capsule 4–5 mm (0.16–0.20 in) in diameter.

== Taxonomy ==
Goodenia havilandii was first formally described in 1913 by Joseph Maiden and Ernst Betche in the Proceedings of the Linnean Society of New South Wales. The specific epithet (havilandii) honours Archdeacon Francis Ernest Haviland (1859–1945), an amateur botanist. In 1990, Roger Carolin selected the specimens collected by Haviland near Cobar in 1911 as the lectotype.

== Distribution and habitat ==
This goodenia in drier areas of southern Australia, from the inland areas of New South Wales to the southern Northern Territory, Queensland, South Australia and Western Australia.
