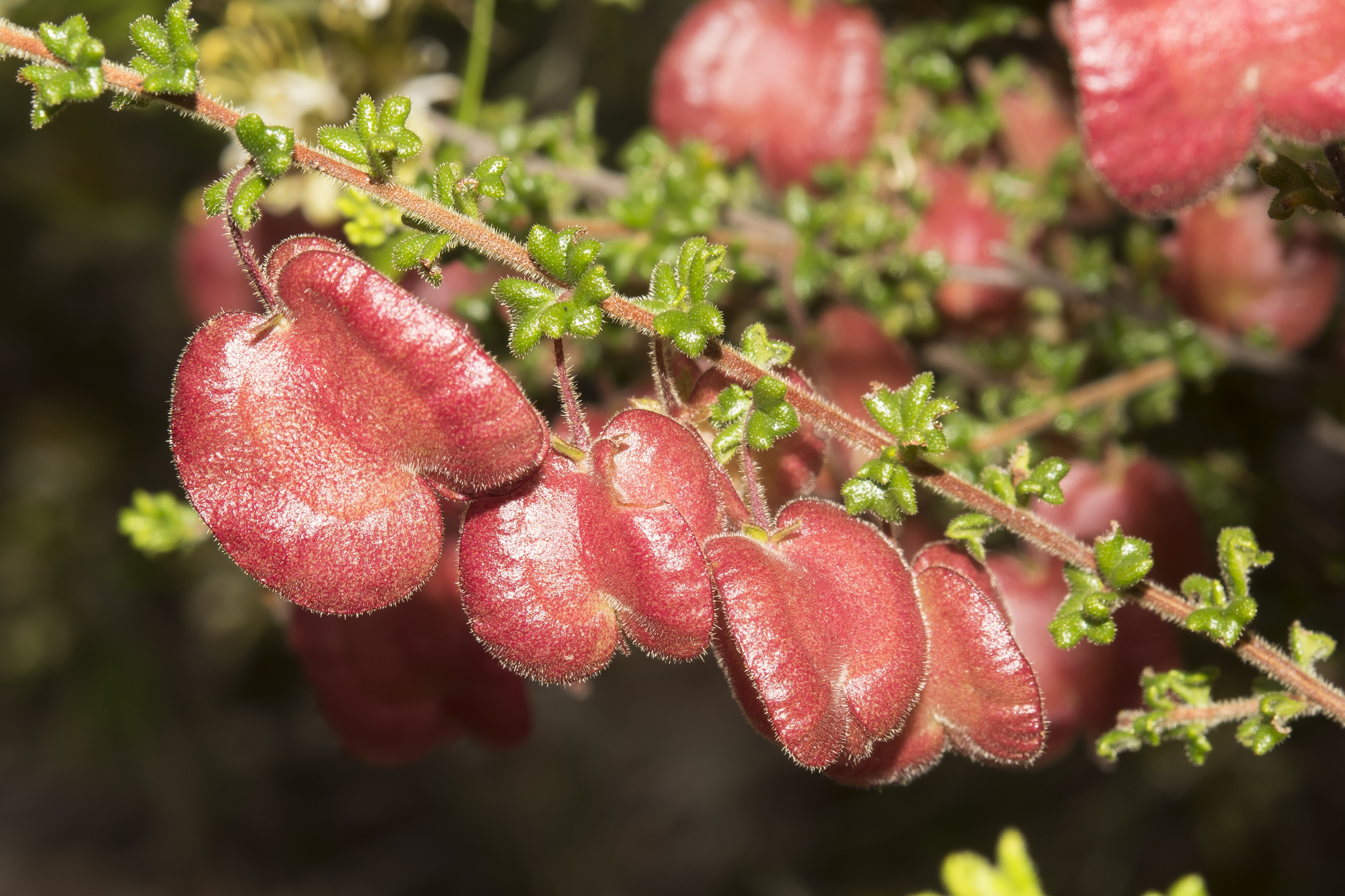
- Near Torrington

Scientific classification
- Kingdom: Plantae
- Clade: Tracheophytes
- Clade: Angiosperms
- Clade: Eudicots
- Clade: Rosids
- Order: Sapindales
- Family: Sapindaceae
- Genus: Dodonaea
- Species: D. hirsuta

Binomial name
- Dodonaea hirsuta (Maiden & Betche) Maiden & Betche

Synonyms
- Dodonaea peduncularis var. hirsuta Maiden & Betche

= Dodonaea hirsuta =

Species of shrub

Dodonaea hirsuta is a species of plant in the family Sapindaceae and is endemic to eastern Australia. It is an erect, dioecious shrub usually with simple, triangular to narrowly egg-shaped leaves with three to five wedge-shaped teeth, flowers arranged singly with four lance-shaped sepals, and 3- or 4-winged capsules.

== Description ==
Dodonaea hirsuta is an erect, dioecious shrub that typically grows to a height of up to 1.5 m (4 ft 11 in). Its leaves are simple, triangular to narrowly egg-shaped with the narrower end towards the base, 3–6 mm (0.12–0.24 in) long and 3–5 mm (0.12–0.20 in) wide, with three to five hairy wedge-shaped teeth on the end with the edges turned under. The flowers are arranged singly on a pedicel 4.5–7 mm (0.18–0.28 in) long with four lance-shaped sepals, 1.5–2.6 mm (0.059–0.102 in) long. The stamens have not been seen, but the ovary is densely covered with soft hairs. The fruit is a three- or four-winged, elliptic to spherical capsule 11–15.5 mm (0.43–0.61 in) long and 12–17 mm (0.47–0.67 in) wide, the wings leathery and 2.5–4.5 mm (0.098–0.177 in) wide.

== Taxonomy ==
This species was first formally described in 1902 by Joseph Maiden and Ernst Betche who gave it the name Dodonaea peduncularis var. hirsuta in the Proceedings of the Linnean Society of New South Wales from specimens collected by John Luke Boorman in 1901. In 1913, the same authors raised the variety to species status as Dodonaea hirsuta in a later edition of the Proceedings of the Linnean Society of New South Wales.

== Distribution and habitat ==
Dodonaea hirsuta grows in forest or heath on granite and sandstone in the Stanthorpe-Wallangarra area of south-east Queensland and the Glen Innes-Grafton areas of northern New South Wales.

== Conservation status ==
Dodonaea hirsuta is listed as "vulnerable" under the Queensland Government Nature Conservation Act 1992.
