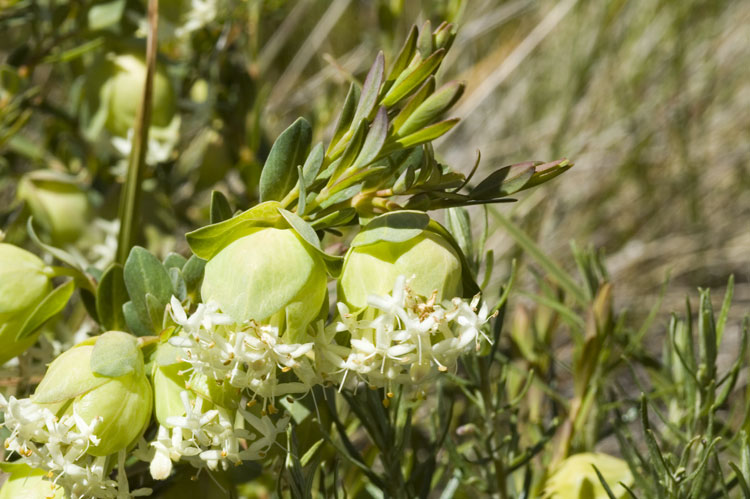

Conservation status
- Critically endangered (EPBC Act)

Scientific classification
- Kingdom: Plantae
- Clade: Tracheophytes
- Clade: Angiosperms
- Clade: Eudicots
- Clade: Rosids
- Order: Malvales
- Family: Thymelaeaceae
- Genus: Pimelea
- Species: P. bracteata

Binomial name
- Pimelea bracteata Threlfall

Synonyms
- Pimelea ligustrina var. glabra Maiden & Betche; Pimelea sp. 'B'

= Pimelea bracteata =

Species of shrub

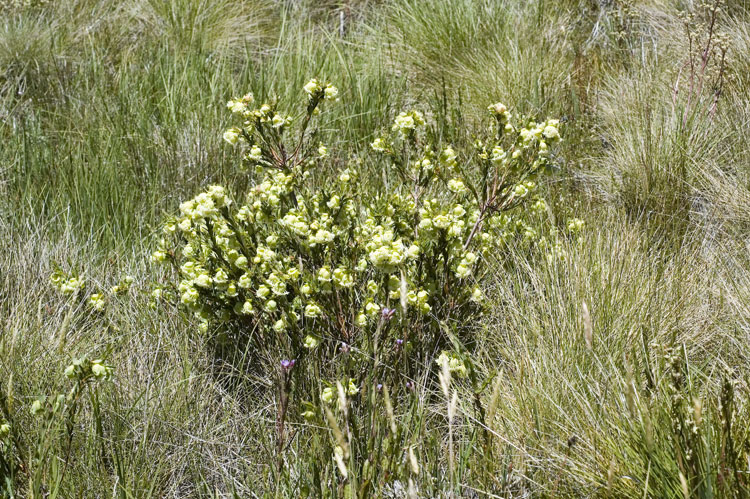
Habit in Kosciuszko National Park

Pimelea bracteata, is a species of flowering plant in the family Thymelaeaceae and is endemic to the south-west of New South Wales. It is a shrub with narrowly egg-shaped to elliptic leaves and pendulous, pale green heads of pale yellow flowers.

== Description ==
Pimelea bracteata is a shrub that typically grows to a height of 0.6–2 m (2 ft 0 in – 6 ft 7 in) and has glabrous stems. The leaves are arranged in opposite pairs, narrowly egg-shaped or narrowly lance-shaped with the narrower end towards the base, to elliptic, 5–20 mm (0.20–0.79 in) long and 2–6 mm (0.079–0.236 in) wide on a short petiole. The leaves are glabrous, the upper surface sometimes purplish and the lower surface a paler shade of green. The flowers are borne in pendulous heads on a peduncle 1–5 mm (0.039–0.197 in) long, each with 6 or 8 broadly elliptic, pale green involucral bracts 12–19 mm (0.47–0.75 in) long and 9–15 mm (0.35–0.59 in) wide surrounding a large number of pale yellow flowers. The sepals are 2–3 mm (0.079–0.118 in) long and the stamens are about the same length as the sepals. Flowering occurs from November to February.

== Taxonomy ==
This pimealea was first formally described in 1902 by Joseph Maiden and Ernst Betche who gave it the name Pimelea ligustrina var. glabra in the Proceedings of the Linnean Society of New South Wales. In 1983 S. Threlfall raised the variety to Pimelea bracteata in the journal Brunonia. The specific epithet (bracteata) means "bracteate".

== Distribution and habitat ==
Pimelea bracteata grows along watercourses and in damp places at altitudes above 1,000 m (3,300 ft) near Kiandra in the Snowy Mountains of New South Wales.

== Conservation status ==
Pimelea bracteata is listed as "critically endangered" under the Australian Government Environment Protection and Biodiversity Conservation Act 1999 and the New South Wales Government Biodiversity Conservation Act 2016. The main threats to the species are disease and habitat fragmentation caused by Phytophthora infection, and the drying of the local environment.
