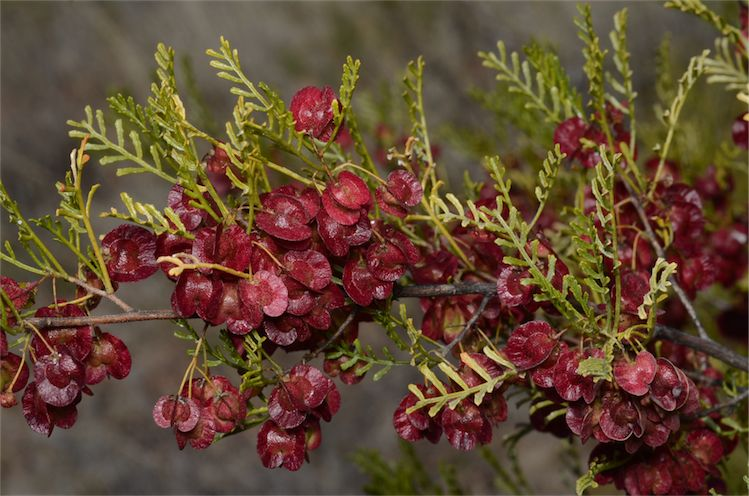

Scientific classification
- Kingdom: Plantae
- Clade: Tracheophytes
- Clade: Angiosperms
- Clade: Eudicots
- Clade: Rosids
- Order: Sapindales
- Family: Sapindaceae
- Genus: Dodonaea
- Species: D. sinuolata

Binomial name
- Dodonaea sinuolata J.G.West

= Dodonaea sinuolata =

Species of plant

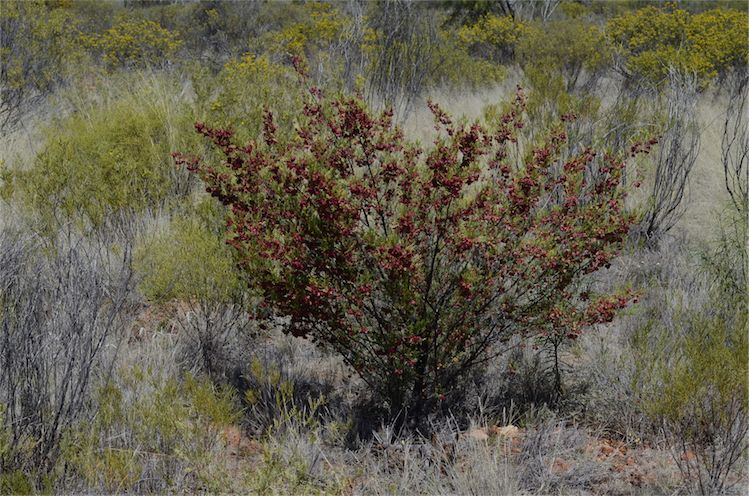
Habit (subsp. acrodenia) near Hungerford

Dodonaea sinuolata is a species of flowering plant in the family Sapindaceae and is endemic to eastern Australia. It is a dioecious, spreading shrub with imparipinnate leaves with mostly 8 to 14 side leaflets, flowers in groups of three or four flowers in axillary cymes, each flower with four sepals, eight stamens, and capsules usually with four leathery wings.

== Description ==
Dodonaea sinuolata is a spreading, dioecious shrub that typically grows to a height of up to 3 m (9.8 ft). Its leaves are imparipinnate 14–28 mm (0.55–1.10 in) long on a petiole 6–20 mm (0.24–0.79 in) long, with mostly 8 to 14 linear to lance-shaped side leaflets with the narrower end towards the base, 5–15.5 mm (0.20–0.61 in) long and 1–2 mm (0.039–0.079 in) wide, sometimes with wavy or toothed edges. The end leaflet is similar to the side leaflets, but shorter and lobe-like. The flowers are arranged in axils in cymes of 3 or 4, each flower on a pedicel 4.5–10 mm (0.18–0.39 in) long. The flowers have four egg-shaped sepals 1.7–3 mm (0.067–0.118 in) long that fall off as the flowers open. There are eight stamens and the ovary is glabrous. The fruit is a glabrous, usually four-winged, broadly elliptic capsule, 9.5–13 mm (0.37–0.51 in) long and 10–15 mm (0.39–0.59 in) wide, the wings leathery and 3–5.5 mm (0.12–0.22 in) wide.

== Taxonomy ==
Dodonaea sinuolata was first formally described in 1984 by Judith Gay West in the journal Brunonia from specimens collected near Texas in 1910 by John Luke Boorman.

In the same edition of Brunonia, West described two subspecies of D. sinuolata, and the names are accepted by the Australian Plant Census:

- Dodonaea sinuolata subsp. acrodentata J.G.West has leaves usually 17–36 mm (0.67–1.42 in) long on a petiole 9.5–20 mm (0.37–0.79 in) long.
- Dodonaea sinuolata J.G.West subsp. sinuolata has leaves usually 14–30 mm (0.55–1.18 in) long on a petiole 6–13 mm (0.24–0.51 in) long.

== Distribution and habitat ==
Subspecies acrodentata grows in red sandy loam on stony ridges in arid and semi-arid areas between Thargomindah, St George and Tambo in Queensland with an isolated occurrence near Hillston in New South Wales. Subspecies sinuolata grows in rocky sites in open forest or woodland between Scone, the Warrumbungles in New South Wales and Chinchilla in Queensland.
