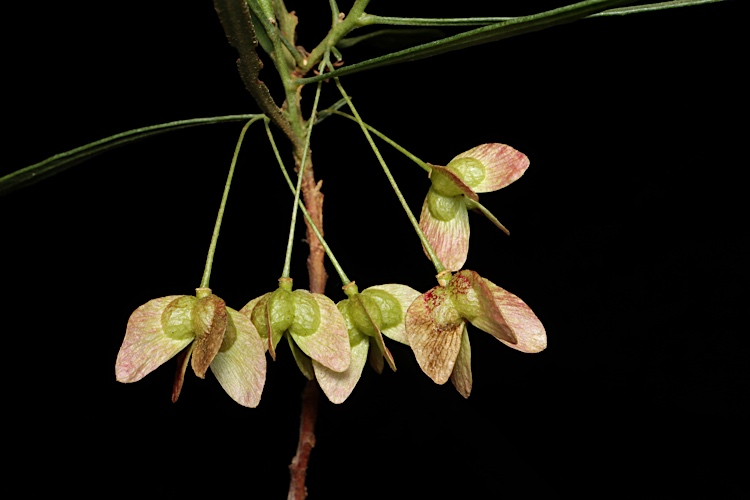
- In the Australian National Botanic Gardens

Scientific classification
- Kingdom: Plantae
- Clade: Tracheophytes
- Clade: Angiosperms
- Clade: Eudicots
- Clade: Rosids
- Order: Sapindales
- Family: Sapindaceae
- Genus: Dodonaea
- Species: D. stenophylla

Binomial name
- Dodonaea stenophylla J.G.West

= Dodonaea stenophylla =

Species of plant

Dodonaea stenophylla, commonly known as netted hopbush, is a species of flowering plant in the family Sapindaceae and is endemic to north-eastern Australia. It is an erect, dioecious shrub with simple, linear leaves, flowers in small groups in axillary cymes, each flower with four sepals, eight stamens, and capsules usually with four membranous wings.

== Description ==
Dodonaea stenophylla is an erect, dioecious shrub that typically grows to a height of up to 4 m (13 ft). Its leaves are simple, erect, and sessile or tapering to a petiole 5–7 mm (0.20–0.28 in) long, 30–105 mm (1.2–4.1 in) long, 1–2.5 mm (0.039–0.098 in) wide with the edges curved down and glabrous. The flowers are usually arranged in cymes in small groups, each flower on a pedicel 2–15 mm (0.079–0.591 in) long. The flowers have four lance-shaped or egg-shaped sepals 1.2–1.8 mm (0.047–0.071 in) long that fall off as the flowers open. There are eight stamens and the ovary is usually glabrous. The fruit is a glabrous, usually four-winged capsule, 5–11 mm (0.20–0.43 in) long and 11–15 mm (0.43–0.59 in) wide, the wings membranous and 3.5–8 mm (0.14–0.31 in) wide.

== Taxonomy ==
Dodonaea stenophylla was first formally described in 1859 by Ferdinand von Mueller in his Fragmenta Phytographiae Australiae from specimens collected near the Burnett River. The specific epithet (stenophylla) means 'narrow-leaved'.

== Distribution and habitat ==
This species of Dodonaea occurs in the Daly Waters region of the Northern Territory and is widespread in central and eastern Queensland, but is rare in the New England region of New South Wales.

== Conservation status ==
Dodonaea stenophylla is listed as of "least concern" under the Northern Territory Governemtn Territory Parks and Wildlife Conservation Act and the Queensland Government Nature Conservation Act 1992, but as "vulnerable" under the New South Wales Government Biodiversity Conservation Act 2016.
