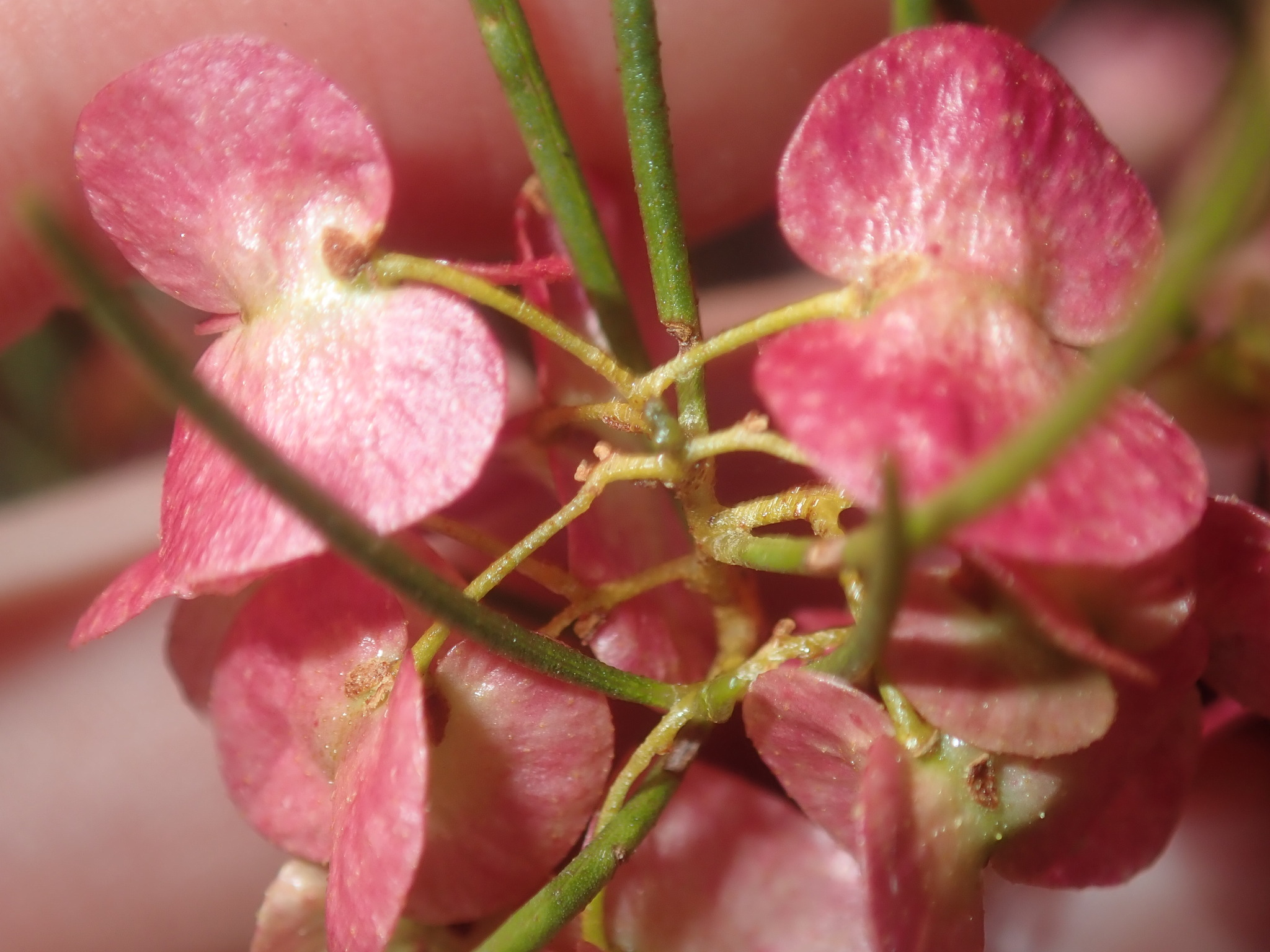

Scientific classification
- Kingdom: Plantae
- Clade: Tracheophytes
- Clade: Angiosperms
- Clade: Eudicots
- Clade: Rosids
- Order: Sapindales
- Family: Sapindaceae
- Genus: Dodonaea
- Species: D. rigida

Binomial name
- Dodonaea rigida J.G.West

= Dodonaea rigida =

Species of plant

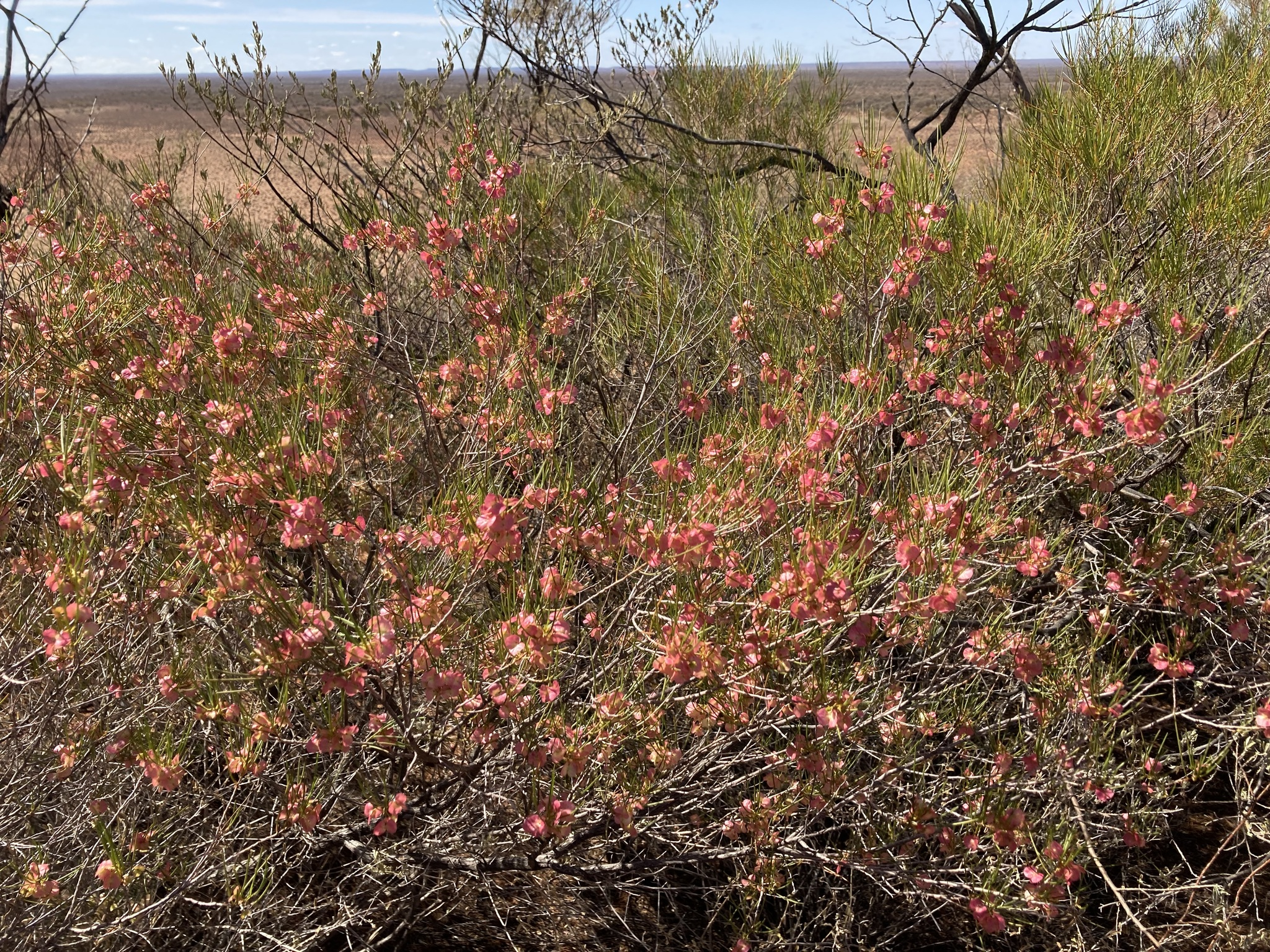
Habit near Yeo Lake Nature Reserve

Dodonaea rigida is a species of flowering plant in the family Sapindaceae and is endemic to Western Australia. It is an erect, dioecious shrub with simple, sessile rigid erect leaves, flowers in cymes of three or four in leaf axils, the flowers usually with three or four sepals, and capsules with three or four membranous wings.

== Description ==
Dodonaea rigida is an erect, dioecious shrub that typically grows to a height of up to 2 m (6 ft 7 in). Its leaves are simple, sessile, rigid, almost thread-like, sometimes sharply pointed, 34–75 mm (1.3–3.0 in) long, about 1 mm (0.039 in) wide. The flowers are arranged in cymes of three or four in leaf axils, each flower on a pedicel 4.5–7.5 mm (0.18–0.30 in) long, with three or four broadly egg-shaped sepals, 1.4–1.7 mm (0.055–0.067 in) long but that fall off as the flowers develop. The ovary is glabrous and the fruit is a three- or four-winged capsule, 10–15 mm (0.39–0.59 in) long and 14–17 mm (0.55–0.67 in) wide, the wings 4–6.5 mm (0.16–0.26 in) wide and membranous.

== Taxonomy ==
Dodonaea rigida was first formally described in 1984 by Judith Gay West in the journal Brunonia. The specific epithet (rigida) means 'hard', referring to the leaves.

== Distribution and habitat ==
This species of Dodonaea grows in sandy soil on sand dunes or rocky ridges near creeks and in sandy loam in shrubland in the Avon Wheatbelt, Coolgardie, Gascoyne, Gibson Desert, Great Victoria Desert, Little Sandy Desert, Murchison, Nullarbor and Yalgoo bioregions of Western Australia.

== Conservation status ==
Dodonaea rigida is listed as "not threatened" by the Government of Western Australia Department of Biodiversity, Conservation and Attractions.
