= Dodonaea glandulosa =

Scientific classification
- Kingdom: Plantae
- Clade: Tracheophytes
- Clade: Angiosperms
- Clade: Eudicots
- Clade: Rosids
- Order: Sapindales
- Family: Sapindaceae
- Genus: Dodonaea
- Species: D. glandulosa

Binomial name
- Dodonaea glandulosa J.G.West

Species of shrub

Dodonaea glandulosa is a species of plant in the family Sapindaceae and is endemic to inland parts of the south-west of Western Australia. It is usually an erect, spreading, dioecious shrub with imparipinnate leaves with usually 11 to 19 oblong leaflets, flowers arranged singly with five or six stamens, and oval capsules.

== Description ==
Dodonaea glandulosa is an erect, spreading, usually dioecious shrub that typically grows to a height of 20–60 cm (7.9–23.6 in). Its leaves are imparipinnate, 5–18 mm (0.20–0.71 in) long with 11 to 19 oblong to broadly egg-shaped leaflets with the narrower end towards the base, 0.8–1.8 mm (0.031–0.071 in) long and wide, on a petiole 0.5–1 mm (0.020–0.039 in) long. The flowers are borne singly on a pedicel 0.5–1 mm (0.020–0.039 in) long. The sepals are egg-shaped to lance-shaped, 1.0–2.5 mm (0.039–0.098 in) long and there are five or six, rarely seven or eight stamens, the ovary with glandular hairs and soft hairs. The fruit is an oval, rarely elliptic capsule 6–8 mm (0.24–0.31 in) long and 4–5.5 mm (0.16–0.22 in) wide without appendages.

== Taxonomy and naming ==
Dodonaea glandulosa was first formally described in 1984 by Judith Gay West in the journal Brunonia from specimens she collected 2.3 km (1.4 mi) north-west of Corrigin in 1978. The specific epithet (glandulosa) means 'gland-bearing'.

== Distribution and habitat ==
This species of Dodonaea grows in semi-arid mixed mallee scrub on undulating plains and breakaways near Kulin and an area east of Lake King-Ravensthorpe in the Mallee bioregion of inland south-west Western Australia.

== Conservation status ==
Dodonaea glandulosa is listed as "not threatened" by the Western Australian Government Department of Biodiversity, Conservation and Attractions.
