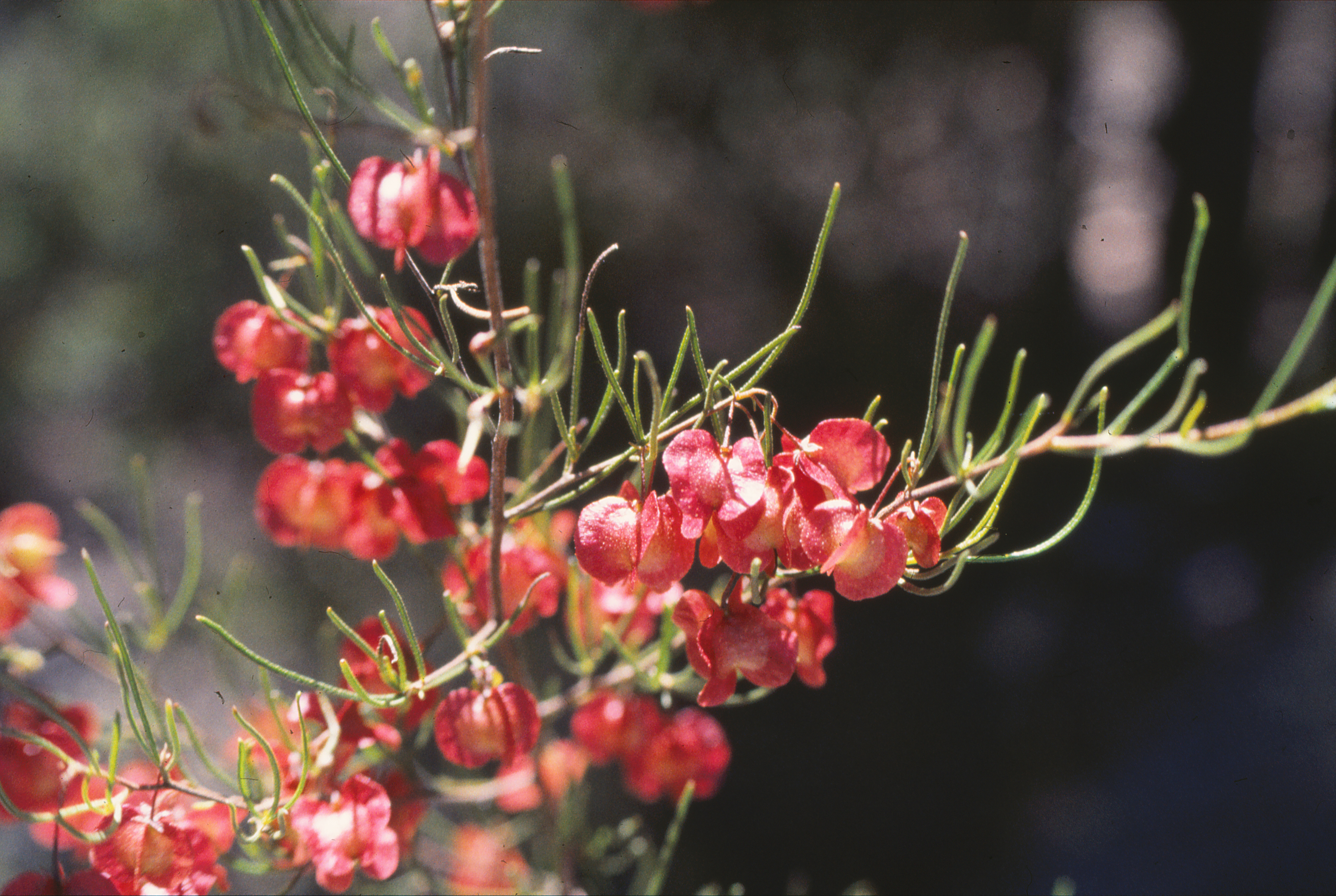
- In Girraween National Park

Scientific classification
- Kingdom: Plantae
- Clade: Tracheophytes
- Clade: Angiosperms
- Clade: Eudicots
- Clade: Rosids
- Order: Sapindales
- Family: Sapindaceae
- Genus: Dodonaea
- Species: D. falcata

Binomial name
- Dodonaea falcata J.G.West

Synonyms
- Dodonaea filifolia auct. non Hook.: Bentham, G., Flora Australiensis

= Dodonaea falcata =

Species of shrub

Dodonaea falcata is a species of plant in the family Sapindaceae and is endemic to eastern Australia. It is an erect shrub with simple, more or less linear leaves, flowers arranged in cymes of three or four, each flower with eight stamens, and 4-winged capsules.

== Description ==
Dodonaea falcata is an erect shrub that typically grows to a height of up to 2 m (6 ft 7 in). Its leaves are simple, sessile, more or less linear and curved, 25–50 mm (0.98–1.97 in) long and about 1 mm (0.039 in) wide. The flowers are borne in three- or four-flowered cymes, with egg-shaped sepals, 1.5–2.5 mm (0.059–0.098 in) long and eight stamens, the ovary with a few soft hairs. The fruit is a four-winged, capsule 9.5–12 mm (0.37–0.47 in) long and 11–14 mm (0.43–0.55 in) wide, the wings membranous, 2.5–4 mm (0.098–0.157 in) wide.

== Taxonomy and naming ==
Dodonaea falcata was first formally described in 1984 by Judith Gay West in the journal Brunonia from specimens collected by Ian Telford in 1969. The specific epithet (falcata) means 'curved like a sickle'.

== Distribution and habitat ==
Dodonaea falcata grows in forest on granite or sandstone hills between the Stanthorpe-Wallangarra area of south-eastern Queensland and the New England Tableland and between Newcastle and Kiama in New South Wales.

== Conservation status ==
Dodonaea falcata is listed as of "least concern" under the Queensland Government Nature Conservation Act 1992.
