= Joseph Edmund Carne =

Australian geologist

Joseph Edmund Carne (12 February 1855 – 23 July 1922) was an Australian geologist.

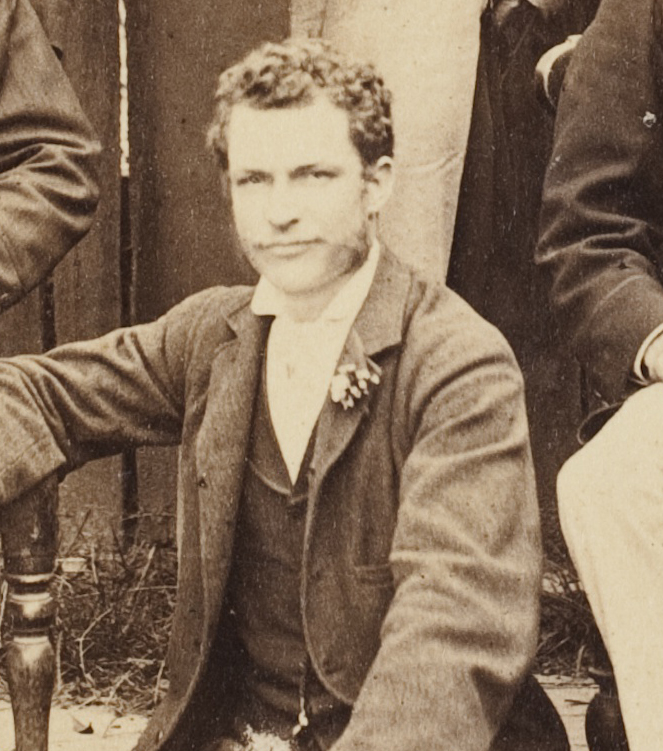
Joseph Edmund Carne, 1879

Carne was born near Urana, New South Wales, to a Cornish Australian family, and was educated at a private school at Campbelltown, New South Wales. He worked in the outback for a while before being urged by Charles Smith Wilkinson to study geology at the Sydney Technical College.

Carne participated in the Geological Survey of New South Wales (1879–1883) as assistant to Wilkinson. He became assistant government geologist in 1902 and in January 1916 succeeded E. F. Pittman as government geologist, retiring in 1919.

Carne was awarded the Clarke Medal by the Royal Society of New South Wales in 1920. The Carne River in Papua New Guinea is named in his honour. He died of disseminated sclerosis at his Strathfield home on 23 July 1922 and was buried in the Anglican section of Rookwood Cemetery.

Awards
Preceded by Leonard Rodway	Clarke Medal; 1920	Succeeded by Joseph James Fletcher
