= Arthur Henry Shakespeare Lucas =

English-born schoolmaster, scientist and publisher (1853–1936)

Arthur Henry Shakespeare Lucas (7 May 1853 – 10 June 1936) was an English-born schoolmaster, scientist and publisher who lived in Australia for over fifty years, and became the most renowned writer on Algae after William Henry Harvey

== Early life ==
Lucas was born in Stratford-on-Avon, Warwickshire, the third son of the Rev. Samuel Lucas, a Wesleyan minister, and his wife Elizabeth, née Broadhead. His father had a passion for geology and botany, and Arthur developed an interest in natural science. Lucas' early childhood was spent in Cornwall, and when he was around nine years of age a move was made to Stow on the Wold in Gloucestershire. Here Lucas went to his first private school, but soon afterwards was sent to Kingswood School in Bath, where he was given a solid education in Classics, Modern Languages, and Mathematics. Lucas went to Balliol College, Oxford in 1870, with an exhibition, and associated with many people became the most distinguished of their time. He graduated with a fourth class honours degree in 1874, following pneumonia before his final examination, but he later won the Burdett-Coutts geological scholarship in 1876. Lucas then went to London to commence a medical course, and won the entrance science scholarship to the London Hospital in Whitechapel. When Lucas was halfway through his course his widower elder brother, Thomas Pennington Lucas, was ordered to leave England due to contracting tuberculosis and went to Australia.

== School Master ==
Arthur Lucas abandoned his course, although was nevertheless awarded B. Sc. by University of London in 1879. He became a master at The Leys School, Cambridge in order to provide for his brother's three young children who remained in the UK. Lucas had previously won the gold medal at an examination for botany held by the Apothecaries Society, open to all medical students of the London schools. Lucas enjoyed his five years at The Leys school. He found the boys frank and high-spirited, fond of games and yet able to do good work in the class-rooms. Lucas played in the football team, until he broke his collar-bone, and founded a natural history society of which the whole school became members. A museum was established to which Lucas gave his father's fine collection of fossils, and also the family collection of plants, which contained 1200 out of the 1400 described species of British flowering plants and ferns. The museum grew in after years, and gained a reputation at Cambridge when one of the boys made interesting finds in the pleistocene beds of the Cam valley. The results of work done by Lucas on the Isle of Wight were published in the Geological Magazine, leading to Lucas being elected a Fellow of the Geological Society of London.

== Wesley College ==
Lucas applied in 1882 for the headmastership of Wesley College, Melbourne, but the appointment was given to Arthur Way. Later on he was appointed mathematical and science master at the same school, arrived in Melbourne at the end of January 1883, and immediately began his work.

== Newington College ==
At the end of 1892 Lucas was appointed headmaster of Newington College, Sydney. During his six years at Newington the number of pupils increased by 50 per cent and the school had much academic success. Lucas was the president of the Old Newingtonians' Union in 1897.

== Sydney Grammar School ==
In 1899 Lucas became senior mathematical and science master at the Sydney Grammar school, was acting headmaster for part of the war years, and finally headmaster from 1920 to 1923.

== University and science career ==
Lucas did not confine his life to school work, and while at Wesley College also lectured on natural science to the colleges at the University of Melbourne, and in later years lectured on physiography at the University of Sydney. He also took much interest in the various learned societies, and during his early days at Melbourne was president of the Field Naturalists Club of Victoria (which was founded by his brother) and edited the Victorian Naturalist for some years. Lucas was a member of the council of the Royal Society of Victoria, and subsequently of the Linnean Society of New South Wales, of which he also became president (1907–1909). Lucas contributed many papers to their proceedings; a list of more than 60 will be found in the Proceedings of the Linnean Society of New South Wales, vol. LXII, pp. 250–2.

He described several new species of Australian reptiles (1894–1903) with Charles Frost. He wrote with Arthur Dendy An Introduction to the Study of Botany which was published in 1892 (3rd ed. 1915), with W. H. D. Le Souef, The Animals of Australia (1909), and The Birds of Australia (1911). After retiring from school teaching at 70 years of age, Lucas became acting-professor of mathematics at the university of Tasmania for over two years. He afterwards continued his scientific studies, giving particular attention to the algae on which he was the Australian authority. His handbook, Part 1 of The Seaweeds of South Australia was issued just after his death. His large collection of algal specimens was bequeathed to the Commonwealth of Australia. It was initially stored at the CSIRO offices in Canberra and then moved for easier access by researchers to the National Herbarium of New South Wales. This move, and curation of the collection, was overseen by Valerie May.

== Family life ==
He married Charlotte Christmas on 29 July 1882 in St Cuthbert, Bedfordshire. She died in 1919. They had four daughters (one of whom died when young) Mesdames Ida Cortis-Jones and J. J. O'Keefe, Miss C. Lucas, and one son. He lived with his daughter Cortis-Jones following his widowerhood.

He developed pneumonia after collecting seaweed from rockpools at Warrnambool, Victoria in May 1936, and during the journey to his home collapsed on the train at Albury, New South Wales. He was taken to a private hospital and died on 10 June 1936. His portrait by H. A. Hanke (1935) hangs in the Assembly Hall of the Sydney Grammar School. His autobiography, A. H. S. Lucas, scientist, His Own Story, was published in 1937.

== Bibliography ==
- Lucas, Arthur Henry Shakespeare (1853–1936) at Bright Sparcs, University of Melbourne

Preceded by William Williams	Headmaster; Newington College; 1893–1898	Succeeded by Edward William Cornwall
