= Charles Smith Wilkinson =

Australian geologist

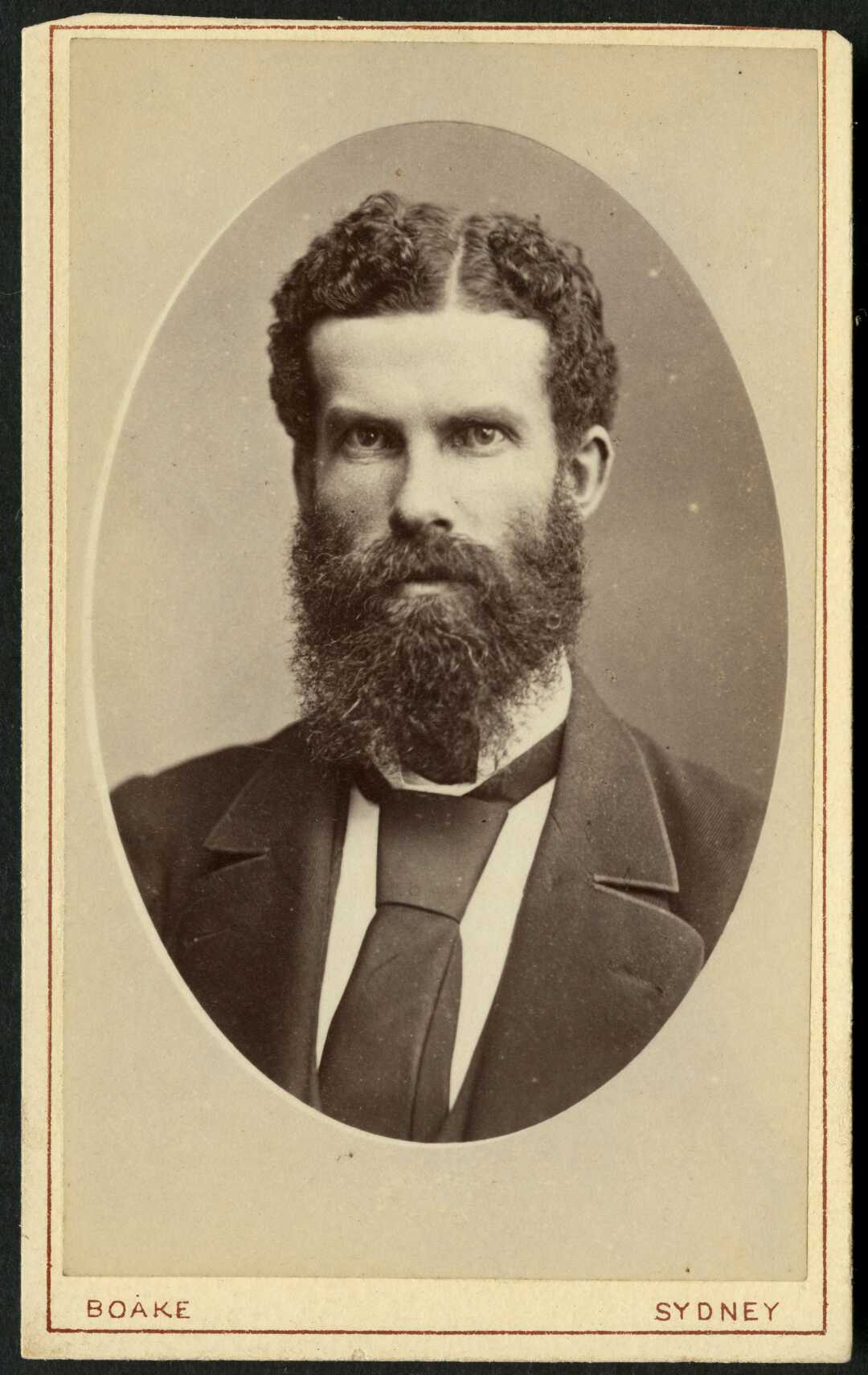
- Carte de visite by Barcroft Capel Boake
- Born: 22 August 1843; Pottersbury, Northamptonshire, England
- Died: 26 August 1891 (aged 48); Sydney, Colony of New South Wales
- Scientific career
- Fields: Geological surveyor

Charles Smith Wilkinson (22 August 1843 – 26 August 1891) was an Australian geologist. He became geological surveyor in charge in the Colony of New South Wales in 1875 and was president of the Royal Society of New South Wales in 1887.

He was described as "an unostentatious but enthusiastic worker in the science of which he was so able an exponent", and "[i]t was not only his skill us a field geologist, but also his large-hearted love of humanity, his unselfishness and unvarying courtesy, which endeared him to us, his colleagues, as well as to the whole mining community and people of New South Wales".

== Early life ==
Wilkinson was born in 1843 in Pottersbury, Northamptonshire, England, the fourth son of David Wilkinson (a civil engineer) and Elizabeth (née Bliss). His father had worked with George Stephenson on the North of England railways.

Wilkinson emigrated to the Colony of Victoria in 1852 with his family, and he continued his education with the Melbourne Collegiate School.

His brother Robert Bliss Wilkinson (1837–1928) later became a member of the New South Wales Legislative Assembly.

== Career ==
Wilkinson commenced in the geological survey office in December 1859, aged 16. In 1863 he went onto lead the survey of the Cape Otway Ranges, before replacing Richard Daintree (1832–1878) in 1866 as field assistant. He later undertook a geological survey of the Leigh River district, and finds relating to gold deposits.

Due to ill health he resigned in 1868, recovered his health in Wagga Wagga, and in 1872 became a licensed surveyor in the Colony of New South Wales. His first assignment was the tin fields in the New England area. In 1874 he was appointed geological surveyor with the Lands Department, and the next year, transferred to the new Department of Mines as the Government Geologist.

He urged Joseph Edmund Carne to study geology; subsequently in 1879, Carne joined the survey as assistant to Wilkinson.

In 1876 Wilkinson was elected a fellow of the Geological Society of London and in 1881 a fellow of the Linnean Society. He also became president of the NSW Linnean Society, and continued on strongly in various fields and endeavours in other societies.

In 1882 Edgeworth David was appointed assistant geological surveyor, and Wilkinson delegated much responsibility to him. Following Wilkinson's 1884 survey of the South Maitland geology, Wilkinson assigned David to undertake a more detailed survey about coal, which resulted in a commercial coal seam at now-Abermain, leading to discovery of the South Maitland coalfields in the Hunter Region.

In 1889 with his brother Robert and four others, Wilkinson received letters patent "for an improved appliance for injecting liquid and gaseous fuel into furnaces".

== Later life ==
On 4 May 1887, Wilkinson married Eliza Jane 'Lizzy' Leitch (the eldest daughter of John and Rachel Leitch), at her father's property Berry Jerry at Wagga Wagga. (On 26 February 1890, brother Robert married Lizzy's sister, Anne Louisa Leitch (the second daughter).)

On the morning of 26 August 1891, Wilkinson died at his residence, Erica, Burwood, Sydney, with cancer of the stomach, following a six week period of feeling unwell. He is buried in the Church of England cemetery, Enfield. He left a widow and two children.

His son pastoralist David Leitch Wilkinson died aged 41 on Friday 12 July 1929 from pneumonia, at Dalgety, New South Wales.

His wife Eliza died at Darlinghurst, Sydney, on Sunday 19 August 1934.

== Legacy ==
Much of the collection of the Geological and Mining Museum, now Earth Exchange, Sydney, was from his efforts, and he was considered an authority on Australian fossil formations.

His name was commemorated in the fossil species of an early amphibian, Platyceps wilkinsonii Stephens 1887, after making the specimen used in its original description available to William John Stephens.
