= Old Mining Museum Building =

Mining Museum (former)
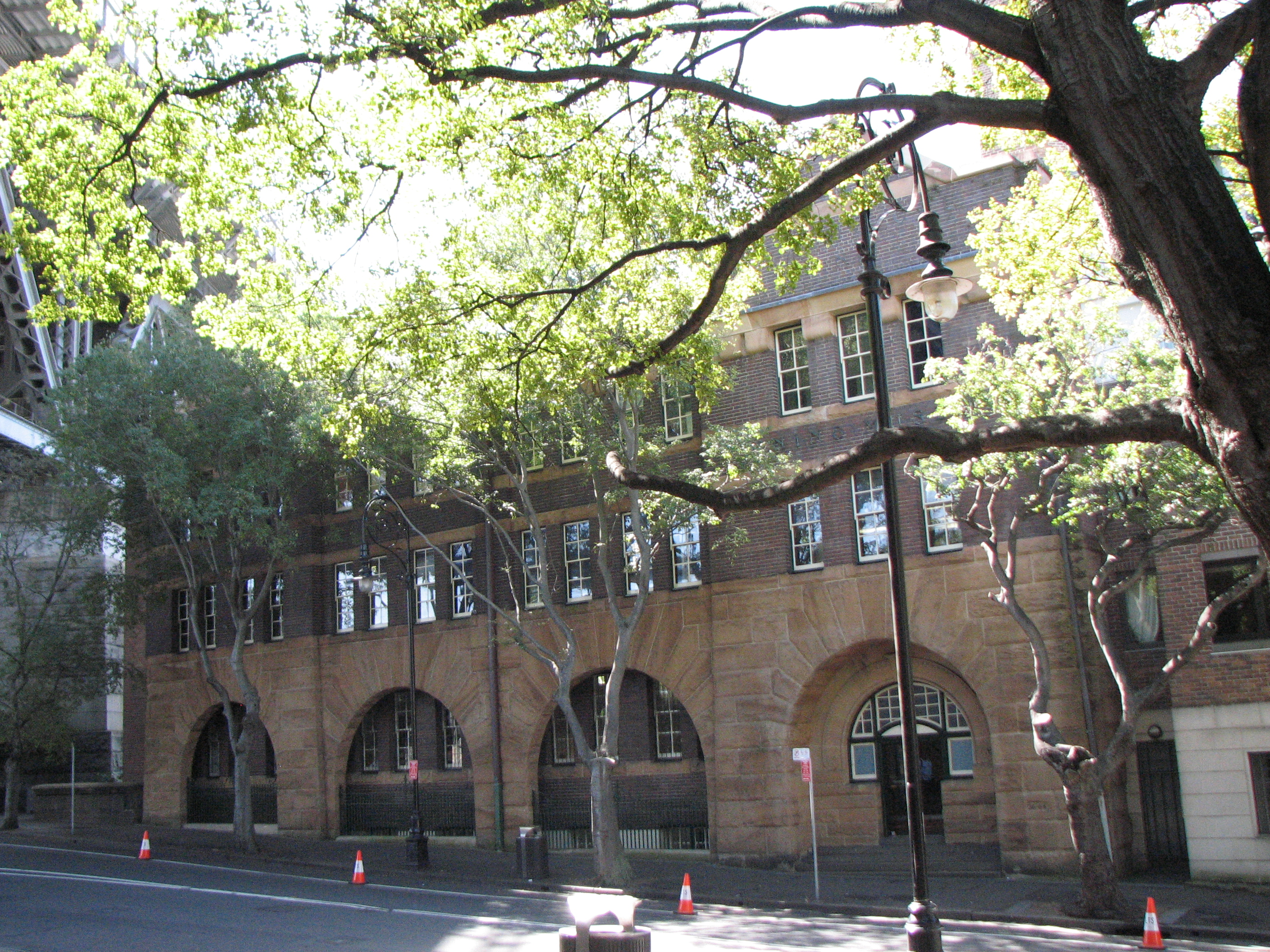
- Old Mining Museum Building

- Location within Sydney Location within Australia
- 33.8566°S 151.2085°E
- Location: 36–64 George Street, The Rocks, City of Sydney, New South Wales, Australia

History
- Built: 1902–1909

Site notes
- Architect: Walter Liberty Vernon
- Architectural style: Federation Warehouse
- Owner: Property NSW

New South Wales Heritage Register
- Official name: Mining Museum (former); Earth Exchange; Sydney Geological and Mining Museum
- Type: State heritage (built)
- Designated: 10 May 2002
- Reference no.: 1555
- Type: historic site

The Old Mining Museum building is a heritage-listed former chemical laboratory and mining museum and now commercial building located at 36–64 George Street in the inner city Sydney suburb of The Rocks in the City of Sydney local government area of New South Wales, Australia. It was designed by Walter Liberty Vernon and built from 1902 to 1909. It is also known as Mining Museum (former), Earth Exchange and Sydney Geological and Mining Museum. The property is owned by Property NSW, an agency of the Government of New South Wales. It was added to the New South Wales State Heritage Register on 10 May 2002.

== History ==
Late 18th century maps and plans of the area indicate that the site was not occupied by any buildings or other human structures.

In 1807 Meehan's map includes the site within a larger parcel of land bounded by High Street (now George Street) and the northern end of Sydney Cove, with the reference "leased to Robert Campbell Esquire" along with two adjoining parcels of land, one to the south, and the other on the western side of High Street.

By 1902 the site of an old quarry that had otherwise not been developed before. Between 1902 and 1904 the lower part of the subject building constructed on the site for a power station and workshops. In 1908 the site vested in Mines Department. Between 1908 and 1909 the upper levels of the subject building constructed for a mining museum and chemical laboratories. In 1901 the Plan of Sydney in Fitzgerald's Royal Commission indicates the present site boundaries. In 1902 plans were drawn by Government Architect Walter Vernon for an Electric Light Station and Workshop. The plan shows six level structure facing George Street and a similar structure facing Hickson Road, with an octagonal chimney stack on the northern side, and an attic level behind Romanesque style parapets and gabled roofs. In 1903, revised plans drawn by Vernon for the Electric Light Station and Workshop now shows a two level structure facing George Street and a three levels high structure facing Hickson Road, with an octagonal chimney stack 60 metres (200 ft) in height on the northern side, and simple gabled roofs. Between 1902 and 1904 the lower part of the building constructed on the site for a power station and workshops but and left unfinished and roofless, with the generating equipment never installed. By 1908 the site was vested in the NSW Mines Department. Between 1908 and 1909 the upper levels of the subject building constructed for a mining museum and chemical laboratories, and a new entrance into George Street, with the Mining Museum opening in August 1909.

By 1930 the Julian Ashton Art School moved into the vacant first floor. A museum shop was established in 1972; and in the following year the Julian Ashton Art School moved out of the building. In 1987 refurbishment plans launched but later delayed until 1989, when the building was transferred to the Geological and Mining Museum Trust, and the name changed to The Earth Exchange. In 1991 the Earth Exchange opened in March; and by 1996 the museum closed permanently. Since 1996, the building has been fitted out for offices.

Archaeological History – Land occupied by Cunnyngehams shipyard by 1840s. Current structure originally constructed as a DC Electricity Power Station between 1902–07. The building is illustrative of the then debate on electricity supply, DC current being strongly, and stubbornly, supported by Thomas Edison. Generally however AC power was universally adopted and this power station was never put into action. In 1909 it became the Mining Museum and remained so until 1995 (by which time it was known as the Earth Exchange). Since then it has generally been vacant with various proposals by the NSW Ministry for the Arts.

== Description ==
The building is a former electrical power station; built between 1902 and 1909. The principal building on the site is the Former Mining Museum and Chemical Laboratory, consisting of a six-storey building and a detached 61-metre (200 ft) high chimney stack, which has been recessed into the side of the rectangular plan of the building. The building addresses two roadways, George Street and Hickson Road. It would appear that considerable bedrock has been excavated to George Street which is approximately three storeys above Hickson Road to facilitate the building on the site. The Former Mining Museum and Chemical Laboratory building has a direct relationship with Circular Quay, George Street and Hickson Road. Positioned between these two important roadways, the building dominates the immediate precinct with its impressive chimney stack, large building scale and its fine proportions. Generally, the building is constructed with a combination of sandstone, brick and rendered facades. The roof is composed of a series of gable roofs, with central sawtooth roof lights. The internal construction is chiefly rolled steel column and beam structure with various sections concrete slab and timber floor construction.

Brick chimney – 61 metres (200 ft) high and foundations.

Style: Federation Warehouse with some distinctive Art Nouveau and Romanesque detailing.; Storeys: Five+ basement; Facade: Combination of sandstone, brick and rendered facades.; Side Rear Walls: Sandstone, brick and recent plasterboard; Internal Walls: Sandstone, brick and recent plasterboard; Floor Frame: Concrete slab and timber.; Ceilings: Plasterboard lining; Sprinkler System: Fire sprinkler system located in roof space.; Lifts: Brick lift well (south end of the building)

=== Condition ===
As at 3 May 2001, Archaeology Assessment Condition: Destroyed. Assessment Basis: Basements below George Street. Terraced into hill slope from Hickson Road.

=== Modifications and dates ===
- 1902–1904 – The lower part
- 1908–1909 – The upper levels
- 1990 – Major internal works were carried out for the reopening of the building as the Earth Exchange.

== Heritage listing ==
As at 30 March 2011, the Mining Museum and site are of State heritage significance for their historical and scientific cultural values. The site and building are also of State heritage significance for their contribution to The Rocks area which is of State Heritage significance in its own right.

The former Mining Museum and Chemical Laboratory site and building is principally significant for its historical and aesthetic significance. It demonstrates the continuous significant human activity of collecting mineral and geological objects of economic and intellectual interest, carried out for almost 90 years on this site. It is an excellent example of the Federation Warehouse style with good proportions and distinctive Romanesque and Art Nouveau detailing. It was designed by a very prominent Federation Period architect, Walter Liberty Vernon, who was the first NSW Government Architect. The design is a well considered and executed approach to the site. The building reflects the early 20th century development phase of The Rocks after the Government resumption. It is significant as an early 20th century museum building illustrating important external and internal design features. It is a very distinctive building with landmark qualities to the local area, The Rocks and Circular Quay. The place is also significant because: It is associated with numerous significant historical events at world, national and state level. It is representative of an educational and research activity that was continuous from the turn of the century to recent times in NSW. The chimney stack is a rare surviving feature in Sydney and has a high level of integrity. The building is a rare example of and inner city building that was originally designed and partially constructed as a power station and then redesigned and completed as a Museum and Chemical Laboratory. The building was associated with electricity generation supply and distribution in Sydney. It is representative of the decision to generally change from direct current (DC) supply to alternating current (AC) supply in NSW.

Mining Museum was listed on the New South Wales State Heritage Register on 10 May 2002 having satisfied the following criteria.

The place is important in demonstrating the course, or pattern, of cultural or natural history in New South Wales.

The building has historical significance as a place that demonstrates the significant human activity of collecting mineral and geological objects of economic and intellectual interest, and is associated with six significant events and at least one significant person, Walter Liberty Vernon. It is representative of both turn of the century power station and museum buildings, and is rare example of a building especially converted for activities associated with museum for collecting, curating and exhibiting the objects of a particular human activity, mining.

The place is important in demonstrating aesthetic characteristics and/or a high degree of creative or technical achievement in New South Wales.

The building is aesthetically distinctive. The building and chimney stack are very distinctive in form, style and detailing. The subject site and building, particularly the chimney stack, is very prominent in The Rocks and Circular Quay and is distinctly a strong visual feature to the local area.

The place has a strong or special association with a particular community or cultural group in New South Wales for social, cultural or spiritual reasons.

The subject site and building have a special cultural, social and educational value as a former Mining Museum and Chemical Laboratories, responsible for collecting, collating, displaying and researching minerals and geological objects. It was also responsible for educating various peoples from Miners to the General Public with different degrees of detail about minerals and geological objects. This association with the site began in 1908 and continued until 1995.

The place has potential to yield information that will contribute to an understanding of the cultural or natural history of New South Wales.

It is an important benchmark and reference type. As an original planned D C Power Station and later as a constructed public institution - a mining museum and chemical laboratory.

The place possesses uncommon, rare or endangered aspects of the cultural or natural history of New South Wales.

This item is assessed as aesthetically rare statewide.

The place is important in demonstrating the principal characteristics of a class of cultural or natural places/environments in New South Wales.

This item is assessed as scientifically representative statewide. This item is assessed as socially representative statewide.

== See also ==
- Australian non-residential architectural styles
- Metcalfe Bond Stores

== Bibliography ==
- Information supplied by Wayne Johnson, SCA.
- Higginbotham, Kass & Walker (1991). The Rocks and Millers Point Archaeological Management Plan.
- Sydney Cove Authority(SCA) (1998). SCA Register 1979-1998.
- Tropman & Tropman Architects (1996). Conservation Assessment Report of The Former Mining Museum & Chemical Laboratory, 36-64 George Street, The Rock.
