= Dorothy Carroll =

Australian geologist

Dorothy Carroll (1907–1970) was an Australian geologist.

Dorothy Carroll was born on 7 June 1907 in Western Australia. Her father was the manager of a stock company. The family lived at Bunbury, and participated in agricultural shows, stock sales and enjoyed riding.

== Early life ==
After attending Bunbury High School, Carroll earned a scholarship to attend the University of Western Australia, but because she had not fulfilled the mathematics prerequisite, studied her B.A. with a major in zoology, graduating in 1929. She later took her B.Sc. with Honours in geology, one of the first women to do so in W.A. Carroll won a scholarship to attend Imperial College in 1934, University of London, and she completed her PhD in 1936. Her thesis was on the mineralogy of soils from the goldfields of Western Australia.

== Career ==
Carroll returned to Australia, and lectured at the University of Western Australia until 1941. During World War II, she worked as a mineralogist for the Chemical laboratories of Western Australia. After accepting a position at the Linnean Society of New South Wales, she served as Secretary, in addition to lecturing at the University of Sydney.

Carroll was offered a Fellowship at Bryn Mawr College, Pennsylvania in 1951, and she used this opportunity to study chemical geological relationships within sediments and soils. She moved from Bryn Mawr to the Geochemistry and Petrology Branch of the U.S. Geological Survey in Beltsville, Maryland in 1952, which had established a sedimentary petrology laboratory, sharing a house with colleague, Marjorie Hooker.

She attended the International Sedimentological Congress in 1953, and remained in London, waiting for an immigrant visa to return to the U.S. She worked on two chapters of the book, Sedimentary Petrography for Henry B. Milner, before re-entry to the U.S. It would be another two years before she became a U.S. citizen. When the petrology lab moved its facilities to Colorado in 1958, Carroll did not relocate. She remained in the Washington D.C. area studying lab methods for the disposal of radioactive waste and ion exchange.

From 1963-1967, Carroll worked in the U.S.G.S. facilities near Menlo Park, California, which was studying marine sediments. When this lab closed in 1967 she remained in the area, studying clay mineralogy.

== Publications ==
Carroll published over 70 papers. They include-

- Carroll, D. (1936). Heavy mineral assemblages of soils from the gold fields of Western Australia. Geological magazine. 869: 503-511.
- Carroll, D. (1939). Movement of sand by wind. Geological magazine. 895: 6-23.
- Higgins, H.G. and Carroll, D. (1940). Mineralogy of some Permian sediments from Western Australia. Geological magazine. 77: 145-160.
- Carroll, D. (1940). Possibilities of heavy-mineral correlation of some Permian sedimentary rocks, New South Wales. Bulletin of the American Association of Petroleum Geologists. 24: 636-648.
- Carroll, D. (1947). Heavy residues of soils from the lower Ord river valley, Western Australia. Journal of Sedimentary Petrology. 17: 8-17.
- Carroll, D. (1952). Mineralogy of some Australian desert soils. Journal of Sedimentary Petrology. 22: 153-161.
- Carroll, D. (1958). Role of clay minerals in the transportation of iron. Geochimica et Cosmochimica Acta. 14: 1-28.
- Carroll, D. (1959). Leaching of clay minerals in a limestone environment. Geochimica et Cosmochimica Acta. 16: 83-87.
- Carroll, D. (1962). The clay minerals in Milner, H.B. Sedimentary petrography. Macmillan: New York.
- Carroll, D. (1970). Rock weathering. Plenum Press: New York.

Dorothy Carroll eventually returned to Washington, D.C. before falling ill with a cyst. She died of cancer on January 30, 1970.
