= Valerie May =

Australian botanist (1916–2007)

- Born: 8 May 1916; Brisbane, Australia
- Died: 27 June 2017 (aged 101)
- Education: University of Sydney
- Known for: marine and freshwater algology; algal taxonomy and ecology; toxic algae; water quality
- Spouse: Ern Jones
- Awards: Honorary Research Associate Royal Botanic Gardens, Sydney in 1987
- Scientific career
- Fields: Botany; Phycology; Toxic algae and water quality
- Workplaces: University of Sydney; CSIRO Fisheries Division, Cronulla; National Herbarium of New South Wales

Valerie May (8 May 1916 – 27 June 2007) was an Australian phycologist, a pioneer and noted expert on toxic algae and water quality, and an interdisciplinary scientist who undertook algal ecology studies in Australia.

== Education ==
Valerie Margaret Beresford May was the daughter of Herbert Walter and Beatrice Adele (née James) May. She commenced a chemistry degree at University of Sydney but changed to botany after taking it as a subsidiary course. She graduated with first class B. Sc. in 1936, having been awarded all the botany prizes during her studies. She was awarded M.Sc. in 1939 for a primarily self-taught study of algae, that had become her main interest. During her master's degree she had reviewed and assembled information from previous studies on algae, making this prior literature much more accessible. The topics were the life history of Ectocarpus and developing keys to the green and brown marine algae. The almost complete absence of phycology from academic study in Australia gave this work added significance.

She married Ern Jones and they had four children together.

== Career ==
May had decided to follow a career working with algae and she achieved this over 50 years. Initially, she continued to study at University of Sydney, supported by various scholarships. These were Sydney University Scientific Research and Commonwealth Research Scholarships and then a Linnean Macleay Fellowship of the Linnean Society of New South Wales. However, when she married in 1940 she was told that this funding would cease.

She therefore took up a post with CSIRO in the Fisheries Division at Cronulla in Sydney. During World War II, CSIRO was tasked to develop industrial-level agar production and she worked on identifying and cataloguing large marine algae that could be used as a source. This involved extensive fieldwork in New South Wales and Queensland. The industry ended after the war due to decline in availability of suitable seaweed and also reduced demand.

From 1960 to 1986 she was the honorary custodian of cryptogams (later renamed honorary phycologist) at the National Herbarium of South Wales, although she had used its resources while studying and working at CSIRO. A large collection of algal specimens had been bequeathed to the Commonwealth of Australia by Arthur Lucas and she arranged the transfer of the 5,000 specimens from CISRO offices in Canberra to the National Herbarium of New South Wales. She focused on the marine Rhodophyta initially and later investigated freshwater algae. In 1966, she was the first person to link cyanobacteria to production of toxins in freshwater that could kill farm animals, working with chemists to identify the toxins. Her work was largely ignored until there was a large occurrence of livestock mortality in the 1990s.

She worked as an interdisciplinary scientist with ecologists, statisticians and veterinary scientists. Her work with toxic algae was recognised internationally and she was able to advise both individuals and organisations.

== Honours ==
The new red algal genus Valeriemaya was named in her honour in 1992 as she was the first to recognised that these algae were not described.

She was awarded an honorary research associate of the Royal Botanic Gardens, Sydney in 1987.

The National Museum of Australia holds the Valerie Jones collection of microscope slides, mounted specimens and the microscope with its wooden case that she used from 1940 to 1990.

== Publications ==
She was author or co-author of a large number of publications. These include:

May, Valerie (1982) The use of epiphytic algae to indicate environmental changes. Australian Journal of Ecology 7 101-102

May, Valerie (1981) The Occurrence of Toxic Cyanophyte Blooms in Australia. Chapter in: The Water Environment:Algal Toxins and Health. eds Wayne W. Carmichael, SpringerLink pp 127–142

May, Valerie, Bennett, Isobel & T. E. Thompson (1970) Herbivore-Algal relationships on a coastal rock platform (Cape Banks, N.S.W.) Oecologia 6 1–14
