= Mary MacLean Hindmarsh =

Australian botanist (1921–2000)

Mary Hindmarsh
- Born: Mary MacLean Hindmarsh; 21 July 1921; Lismore, New South Wales
- Died: 10 April 2000 (aged 78); Australia
- Education: Lismore High School
- Alma mater: University of New England; University of Sydney
- Occupation: Botanist
- Employer: New South Wales University of Technology

Mary MacLean Hindmarsh (21 July 1921 – 10 April 2000) was an Australian botanist who worked at the New South Wales University of Technology in Ultimo as a professor of biology. A graduate of the University of New England in Armidale and the University of Sydney, she did a doctorate study on the effects of certain substances of cell division and root growth and research on a key to rainforest species south of the watershed of the Macleay River. Hindmarsh was a foundation council member of the Linnean Society of New South Wales from 1970 to 1974.

== Biography ==
On 21 July 1921, Hindmarsh was born in Lismore, New South Wales. She was the oldest of four children, with three younger sisters. Hindmarsh was raised by her grandmother following the death of her mother. She was enthusiastic about botany, and matriculated to the University of New England in Armidale in 1939 as part of its second intake of students, opting for biology. This followed her secondary education at Lismore High School. In 1943, Hindmarsh graduated with a Bachelor of Science degree in botany and geology. For a short time, she taught at private schools in Sydney for a year, and conducted a part-time job at the University of Sydney. Hindmarsh demonstrated botany that included work with former service people under the Commonwealth Reconstruction Training Scheme.

She won a three-year Linnean Macleay Fellowship at the University of Sydney from 1949 to 1953. Hindmarsh authored a doctorate study on the effects of certain substances on cell division and root growth. She did a year's worth of post-graduate research studying cell division at the Chester Beatty Research Institute of the Royal Marsden Hospital between 1953 and 1954. Hindmarsh graduated with a Doctor of Philosophy degree in 1955. That same year, she became one of two biology lecturers and the sole female botanist at the New South Wales University of Technology in Ultimo, where she built an herbarium collection for research and teaching and was internationally registered. Hindmarsh was aware of the importance of electron microscopy in biological research. She was promoted to senior lecturer of the School of Biological Sciences's botany department in 1959.

In 1972, she was promoted to associate professor of botany, and held the post until her retirement on 31 December 1977. In retirement, Hindmarsh continued conducting botanical research in the New South Wales coastal rainforest, such as working on fieldwork and research on a key to rainforest species south of the watershed of the Macleay River. She never finished her work on the project because her colleague John Waterhouse died suddenly in 1983. Hindmarsh worked on making cabinets, woodcarving and playing croquet in her spare time. She also qualified as a croquet coach and referee and was appointed a life member of the Mosman Croquet Club. Hindmarsh was also a foundation council member of the Linnean Society of New South Wales between 1970 and 1974.

== Death ==
She had systemic lupus erythemathosis for around 45 years since she was in her 30s before developing motor neurone disease in the final two years of her life. On 10 April 2000, Hindmarsh died of the disease.

== Legacy ==
Ken Anderson of The Daily Telegraph wrote of her legacy: "Mary Hindmarsh was a pioneering botanist and academic who contributed to the cause of women in science." A rector at the New South Wales University of Technology described Hindmarsh as "a pioneering botanist and academic, a conscientious and caring teacher, a fair and just administrator, and someone who made a contribution to women in science, especially at UNSW."

== Bibliography ==
- Hindmarsh, Mary Maclean (1955). A Study of the Effects of Certain Substances on Cell Division and Root Growth. University of Sydney.
