= Joseph James Fletcher =

Australian biologist

- Born: Joseph James Fletcher; 7 January 1850; Auckland
- Died: 15 May 1926 (aged 76)
- Education: Ipswich Grammar; Newington College; University of Sydney; Royal School of Mines; University College London
- Known for: Biology
- Spouse: Emma Jane (née Spencer)
- Awards: Clarke Medal, 1921
- Scientific career
- Author abbrev. (zoology): J. J. Fletcher

Joseph James Fletcher (7 January 1850 – 15 May 1926) was an Australian biologist, winner of the 1921 Clarke Medal.

His contribution to Australian herpetology is suggested to have been as an important catalyst amongst his contemporaries in assembling records and collections of Australian reptiles and amphibians, a neglected area of research. These efforts were particularly noted for his association with the Horn expedition to central Australia.

== Bibliography ==
- David Macmillan, Newington College 1863–1963 (Sydney, 1963)
- Peter Swain, Newington Across the Years 1863–1998 (Sydney, 1999)

Awards
Preceded by Joseph Edmund Carne	Clarke Medal; 1921	Succeeded by Richard Thomas Baker
