= Earth Exchange, Sydney =

Former museum in Sydney, Australia

Earth Exchange
- Former name: Geological and Mining Museum
- Established: 1909-1995
- Type: Museum

The Earth Exchange was a museum of minerals and mining located at 36-64 George Street, The Rocks in Sydney. Prior to being re-branded and adopting a new corporate board as the Earth Exchange from 1988-1995, the museum was variously known as the Geological and Mining Museum, the Mining Museum and Chemical Laboratory. The building, collection and the site are of state heritage significance.

== History ==
The museum operated under various names at 36-64 George Street from 1909-1995. The Earth Exchange was a museum that was re-birthed from the former Sydney Geological and Mining Museum under the auspices of the New South Wales Department of Mineral Resources. Located in the Rocks area of Sydney the building which housed the museum was originally designed by Walter Liberty Vernon, the first New South Wales government architect, as a single storey Electric Light Power Station for the redevelopment of the area in 1900. However, demand for electricity outstripped supply the Powerhouse was capable of ever delivering and the structure remained unused. In 1908, Vernon was asked to submit plans to convert the building into a mining museum and chemical laboratory. He re-submitted his original plans for a six-storey building and added an additional three storeys which was accepted by the government of the day

This public museum resource continued until 1991. Coinciding with a shift to convert some public assets to private enterprises, the Sydney Geological and Mining Museum became The Earth Exchange sponsored substantially by a number of mining companies and the NSW Government through an energy fund. It was one of the first museums to include 'visitor experiences' in developing technological interactivity with audiences in Sydney, including a simulated earthquake section and showcasing underground mining exhibits. However, The Earth Exchange closed in 1995 when the State Government withdrew its annual grant for administration costs. Its collection was dispersed to other public museums most notably the Australian Museum. It subsequently was used to house a number of arts organisations.

== Design of the building ==
The building was designed by the first government architect, Walter Liberty Vernon. Vernon's original plans incorporated six storeys but were reduced to one storey by the government. He re-submitted the original plans for the new museum in 1908 and added three additional storeys. The re-submitted designs were in keeping with the adjacent Federation style wool stores. Vernon used sandstone string work embedded into the predominantly red brick work and included gabled roofs.

== Transformation to The Earth Exchange ==
The Geological and Mining Museum was originally established in 1886 under the auspices of the NSW Geological survey. The collection consisted primarily of fossils, rocks and minerals - many of the petrological and paleontological specimens remained with the Department of Mineral Resources the parent of the Geological Survey. The comprehensive collection accounted for some 20,777 items

The museum was open to the public and functioned as an educational institution with an annual visitation of over 100,000 students from schools. Peak public visitation coincided with school holidays. Refurbishment plans for the museum began in 1984 to coincide with the Bicentennial planned for 1988. The opening of the refurbished museum was delayed until 1991 and rebranded as The Earth Exchange with a board of trustees including business and mining interests.

There were a number of differences that marked the newly branded Earth Exchange from its former life as the Geological and Mining Museum. Firstly, it operated as a semi-commercial operation rather than under the auspices of a public government department. Secondly, the incorporated entity's governance structure (constituted under its own Act of Parliament) included few arts or cultural representatives on the board of trustees. Thirdly, the inaugural director, a principal geologist recruited from the Department of Mineral Resources, who was responsible for the fund raising and redevelopment works, was followed by a new director appointed directly from the museum profession to complete the project and open the Museum. The Earth Exchange, like all other museums in NSW, was dependent on government support for administration and reliant on continuing sponsorship from the mining industry. The mining industry and government committed a total of some $23 million to the development of this project. Nonetheless, it was also expected to be part of the museum sector and to offer education and curatorial services and to develop and preserve its various collections. However, tension arose between The Earth Exchange and the Australian Museum when The Earth Exchange was successful, with NSW Government support, in acquiring competitively the world-class Albert Chapman minerals collection. The new director was not only an advocate of traditional museum services but was also an advocate of the value of entertainment for visitors - a relatively new and controversial concept in museology. Like all other museums, this entity at its re-birth was to some extent caught in a tension between an adherence to museological practice which demanded scholarship, balanced exhibitions and scope for debate and specialist benefactors and sponsors who were keen to showcase the benefits of the extractive industries to Australia's economy.

At the time of The Earth Exchange's entry into the museum sector, a number of other new museums entered the space. This meant that there was significant competition for visitor numbers spread among more museum attractions. The Earth Exchange's business model was predicated on high numbers of paying visitors in a culturally competitive environment. The projected visitor figures and associated income was always unlikely to be realised where entry was free at most museums. Even when subsequently museum entry fees were generally introduced, the entry fee to The Earth Exchange was double that of its competitors.

== Collection and Visitor Experience ==
The Earth Exchange had inherited a significant collection from its former incarnation. It had also acquired the valuable and prestigious Minerals Collection, specially displayed on the fifth floor of the museum. Additionally, the Earth Exchange introduced a number of interactive and immersive displays that were intended to involve visitors in simulations of earthquakes and underground mining. These immersive attractions were costly to develop and were subject to a number of ongoing technical disruptions, disappointing visitors who may have expected more from their entry fee. This became particularly problematic when a survey (1992) of visitors indicated that 73% of respondents had attended because of the entertainment elements.

The building itself was difficult to navigate given its original purpose as a powerhouse. It was designed as a vertical entity not the usual horizontal design of a museum. Visitor flow was difficult, costs associated with maintenance for interactive displays increased and turnover of exhibitions was minimal.

In addition, there was increasing dislocation between the Director and the Board of Trustees when temporary exhibitions on energy and environmental concerns were mounted .

== Controversy about the museum's future ==
There were a number of controversies surrounding The Earth Exchange even at its inception. These controversies compounded over the years 1991-1995 when The Earth Exchange was finally closed. The most significant controversies revolved around a mismatch of expectation among a number of stakeholders. The Board of Trustees were expecting The Earth Exchange to be a showcase of the value of the extractive industries; the Director of the museum was professionally aligned with concepts of museology which promoted education, debate and scholarship.

The Director was also an advocate of the value of entertainment as a way of attracting visitor numbers, which was critical given the museum's reliance on private resource provision. At the same time, Sydney was developing a number of visitor attractions where such entertainment and education could be consumed reliably and relatively cheaply compared to The Earth Exchange (The Story of Sydney, Museum of Contemporary Arts, Australian National Maritime Museum, Hyde Park Barracks, and Darling Harbour attractions).

The Earth Exchange, a creature of the Department of Minerals and Energy, lay outside the museum sector supported by the Ministry for the Arts. This was an uncomfortable position for The Earth Exchange to occupy when sponsorship started to fall away and reliance on government came to the fore. The Ministry for the Arts at the time became increasingly powerful within the government of the day and believed that the acquisition of the prized Albert Chapman Minerals Collection would have been better housed in another museum. They were reluctant to come to the aid of The Earth Exchange in the final analysis given their own growing cultural portfolio.

The Earth Exchange finally closed its doors in 1995. Its collection was re-distributed among other museums and the prized Albert Chapman Minerals Collection was acquired by the Australian Museum.

== See also ==
- Australian Museum
- Old Mining Museum Building
