= Linnean Society of New South Wales =

Australian scientific society

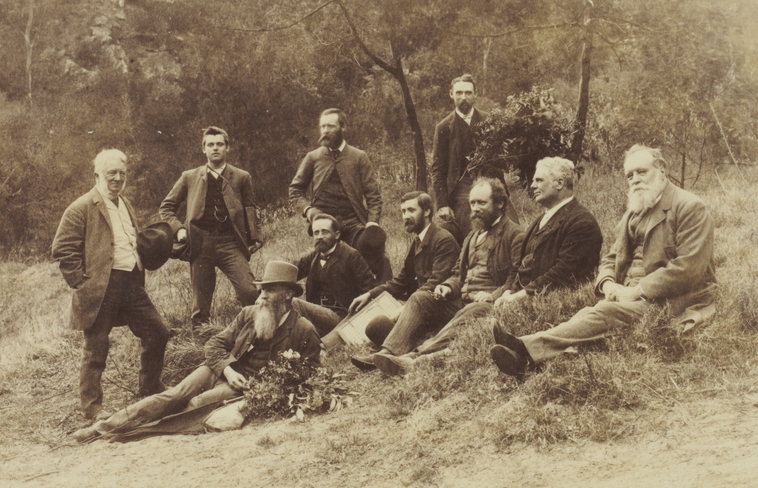
Members of the Society in 1888. Sitting, from right to left: Sir William Macleay, Dr James Cox, John Brazier, J. H. Maiden, Ernst Betche, Henry Deane. Standing, from left right: Professor W.J. Stephens, Frederick Skuse, Frank Meyrick de Meyrick, J.J. Fletcher.

The Linnean Society of New South Wales promotes the Cultivation and Study of the Science of Natural History in all its Branches and was founded in Sydney, New South Wales (Australia) in 1874 and incorporated in 1884.

== History ==
The Society succeeded the Entomological Society of New South Wales, founded in 1862 which folded in 1872, with James Charles Cox as its first president. The first issue of Proceedings was in 1875.

The establishment of the Society was largely due to the dedication and financial support of its first President, Sir William Macleay.

Joseph James Fletcher was director and librarian (this title was afterwards changed to secretary) from 1885 and edited 33 volumes of the Proceedings of the society.

In September 1882, a fire destroyed the library and a part of the scientific material of the society. The efforts of William Macleay made it possible nevertheless for the society to continue its activities.

== Macleay bursary ==
In 1903, the Society created the Macleay bursary, which has since helped many students of the University of Sydney to continue their studies and to engage of the significant research tasks in the fields of botany, zoology or geology.

These included Valerie May although it was discontinued on her marriage.

== Notable people ==
Notable members and position holders include:

- Sir William Macleay
- John William Brazier
- William Aitcheson Haswell, elected 1879
- Julian Tenison Woods, president 1880
- Charles Smith Wilkinson, president 1883–84
- Robert Kaleski, fellow.
- Joseph James Fletcher
- Arthur Henry Shakespeare Lucas, president 1907–09
- Charles Hedley, president 1909–11
- William Sutherland Dun, president 1913–14
- Richard Hind Cambage, president 1924
- Herbert James Carter, president 1925–26
- Eustace William Ferguson 1926–27
- Charles Anderson, president 1932
- Ernest Clayton Andrews, president 1937
- Arthur Bache Walkom, president 1941–42
- Ida Alison Brown, president 1945–46
- Rutherford Ness Robertson, president 1949
- Gilbert Percy Whitley, president 1963–64
- Joyce Winifred Vickery, council member 1969–78
- June Lascelles, microbiologist
- Dorothy Carroll, Society secretary (geologist)
- Mary MacLean Hindmarsh, botanist

== Journal ==
- The Proceedings of the Linnean Society of New South Wales (v.1:1875–1877 – v.138:2016)
- The Proceedings of the Linnean Society of New South Wales (more recent)

== See also ==
- Linnean Society of London
