= Judith Gay West =

Australian botanist

Judith Gay West AO (born 1949) is an Australian scientist currently working as an executive director of the Australian National Botanic Gardens. West holds a doctor of philosophy (PhD) by thesis on "A taxonomic revision of Dodonaea (Sapindaceae) in Australia". She completed her PhD in 1981 from the University of Adelaide, South Australia.

West completed her Bachelor of Science in 1970 with majors in Botany and Zoology from the University of Sydney, New South Wales. She completed her Bachelor of Science (Honours) with first class honours in Botany in 1972, also from the University of Sydney.

West has been pivotal in raising the profile of Australian plant systematics through her ongoing participation on multiple national and international associations and committees.

West's research centres on plant systematics of Australian plants, in particular morphological and breeding system evidence in combination with molecular data. West is proactive in sharing her research so as to incorporate the knowledge into interactive identification packages of nationally significant groups, including eucalypts, legumes, grevilleas, orchids and tropical rainforest plants.

She has represented Australian herbaria as the Australian Botanical Liaison Officer in 1988 with the Royal Botanic Gardens, Kew, United Kingdom.

== Awards and honours ==
In 2001, West was awarded the Nancy T Burbidge Medal by the Australian Systematic Botany Society for longstanding and significant contribution to Australian systematic botany.

In 2003, West was awarded an Officer of the Order of Australia for service to the advancement of botanical science and research, particularly in the field of plant systematics, to science administration and policy development, and to the establishment of Australia's Virtual Herbarium.

== Career ==
- 1973 – 1977 – tutor at the Botany Department, University of Adelaide, South Australia.
- 1980 – Research Scientist of the Australian National Herbarium, CSIRO Plant Industry, Canberra.
- 1987 – Australian Botanical Liaison Officer, Royal Botanic Gardens, Kew, United Kingdom.
- 1989 – 1996 – Senior Principal Research Scientist and Program Leader of the Australian Flora Resources and Management program, CSIRO Plant Industry, Canberra.
- 1989 – Director, Australian National Herbarium.
- 1994 – Directorship, Centre for Plant Biodiversity research, CSIRO Plant Industry.
- 1999 – Adjunct Professor, Division of Botany and Zoology, Australian National University, Canberra.
- 2009 – Executive Director, Australian National Botanic Gardens and head of Parks and Biodiversity Science within the Australian Government Department of the Environment.
- 2018 - Acting Director of National Parks
