= Ernst Betche =

German botanist (1851–1913)

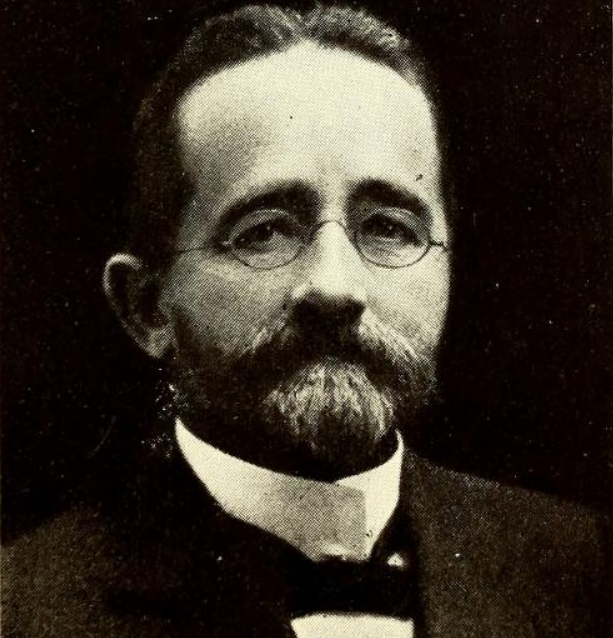
Ernst Betche 1905

Daniel Ludwig Ernst Betche (31 December 1851, in Potsdam – 28 June 1913, in Sydney) was a German-Australian horticulturist and botanist. The standard author abbreviation Betche is used to indicate this person as the author when citing a botanical name.

His mother died at his birth and he was of delicate constitution all his life. His father was sufficiently well off to send him to winter in the warmer climate of Italy.

He attended horticultural college in Potsdam and later worked at the municipal gardens in Berlin. In 1874 he began work as a gardener in the nursery of Louis van Houtte in Ghent. Around 1880, he visited Samoa, Tonga, the Marshall and Caroline Islands. From his travels in the South Seas, he issued two papers on flora native to the islands. Ferns collected in the islands were shipped to Leipzig University, and the rest of the specimens were given to botanist Ferdinand von Mueller.

In September 1881 he was hired as a collector at the Royal Botanic Garden, Sydney. In March 1897, he became a botanical assistant to Joseph Maiden. In Australia, he distinguished himself in the field of botanical systematics.

The botanical genus Betchea (now a synonym of Ackama) was named in his honor by Rudolf Schlechter.

== Principal works ==
- "Handbook of the Flora of New South Wales", 1893 (with Charles Moore).
- "A Census of New South Wales Plants", 1916 (with Joseph Maiden).
