= List of Hibbertia species =

This is a list of Hibbertia species accepted by Plants of the World Online as of November 2025:

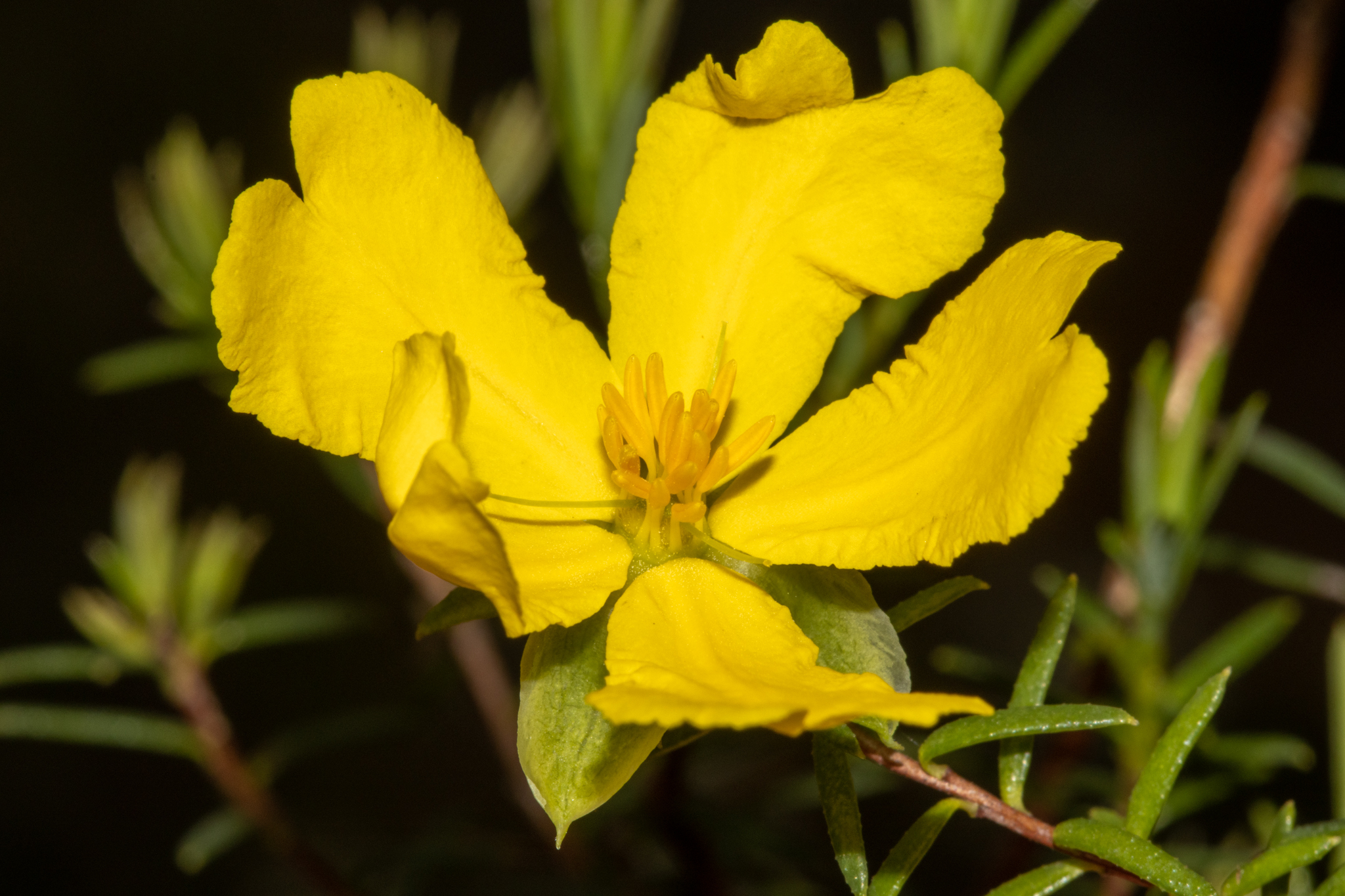
Hibbertia acutifolia

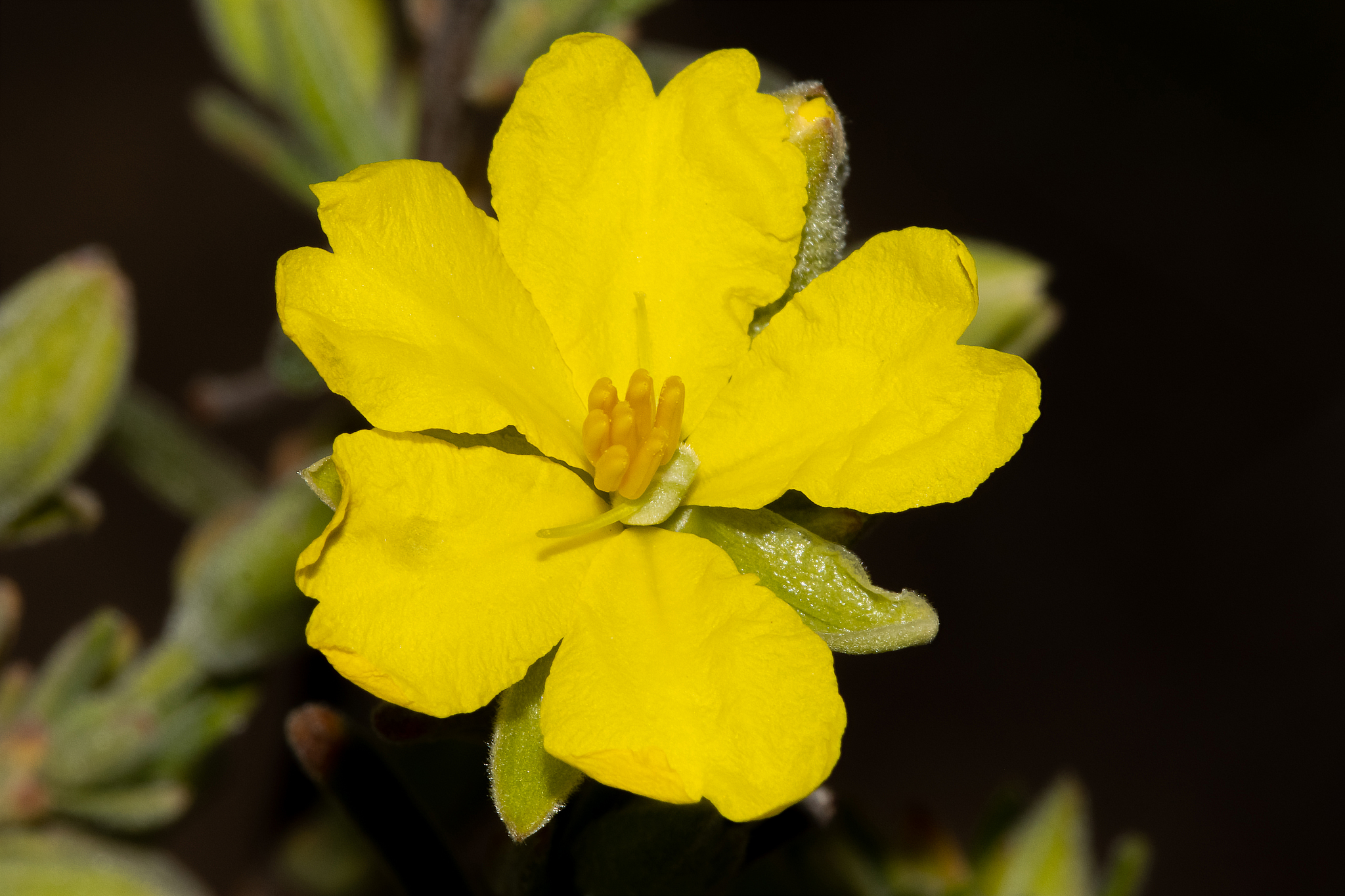
Hibbertia australis

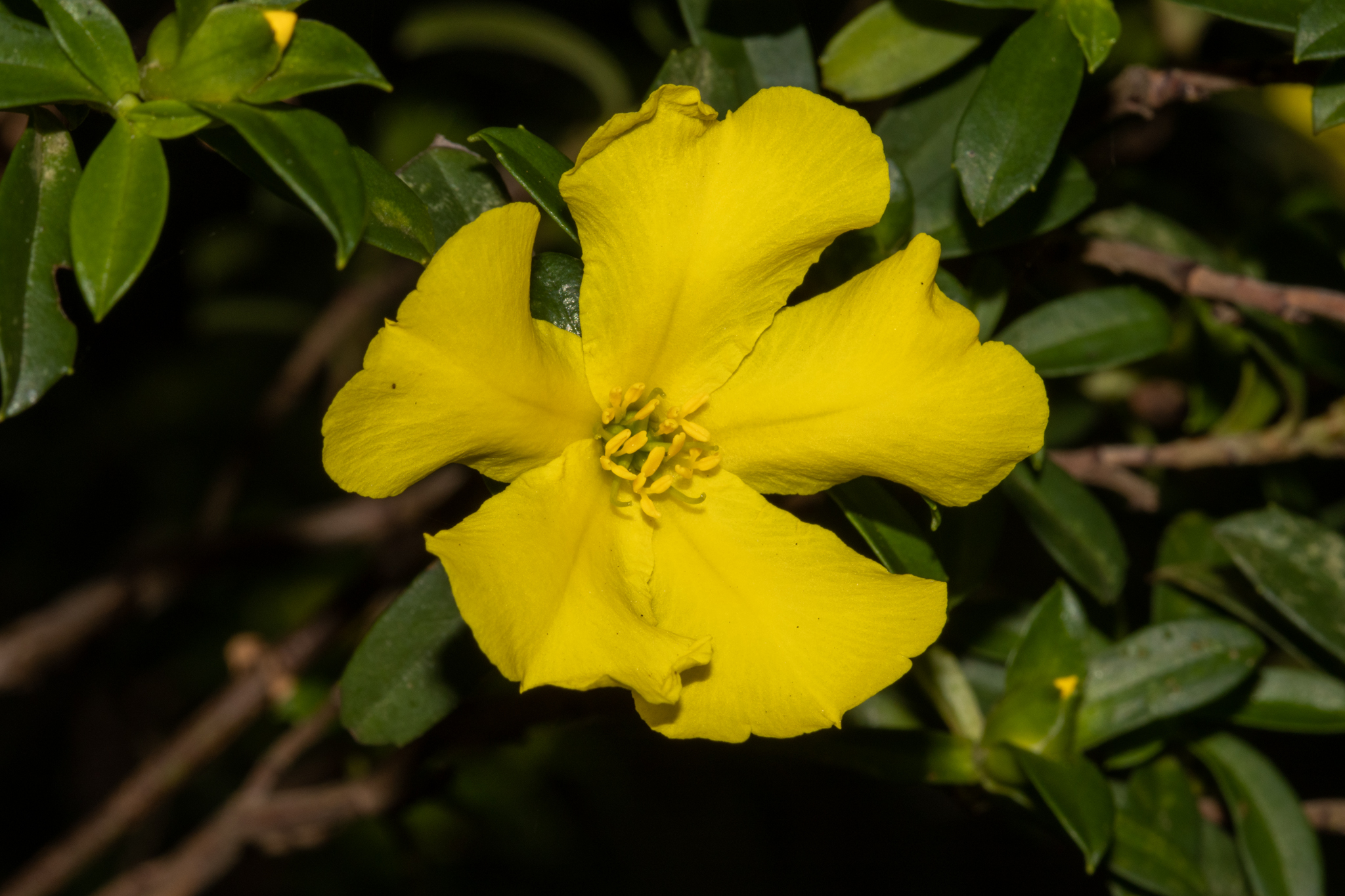
Hibbertia cuneiformis

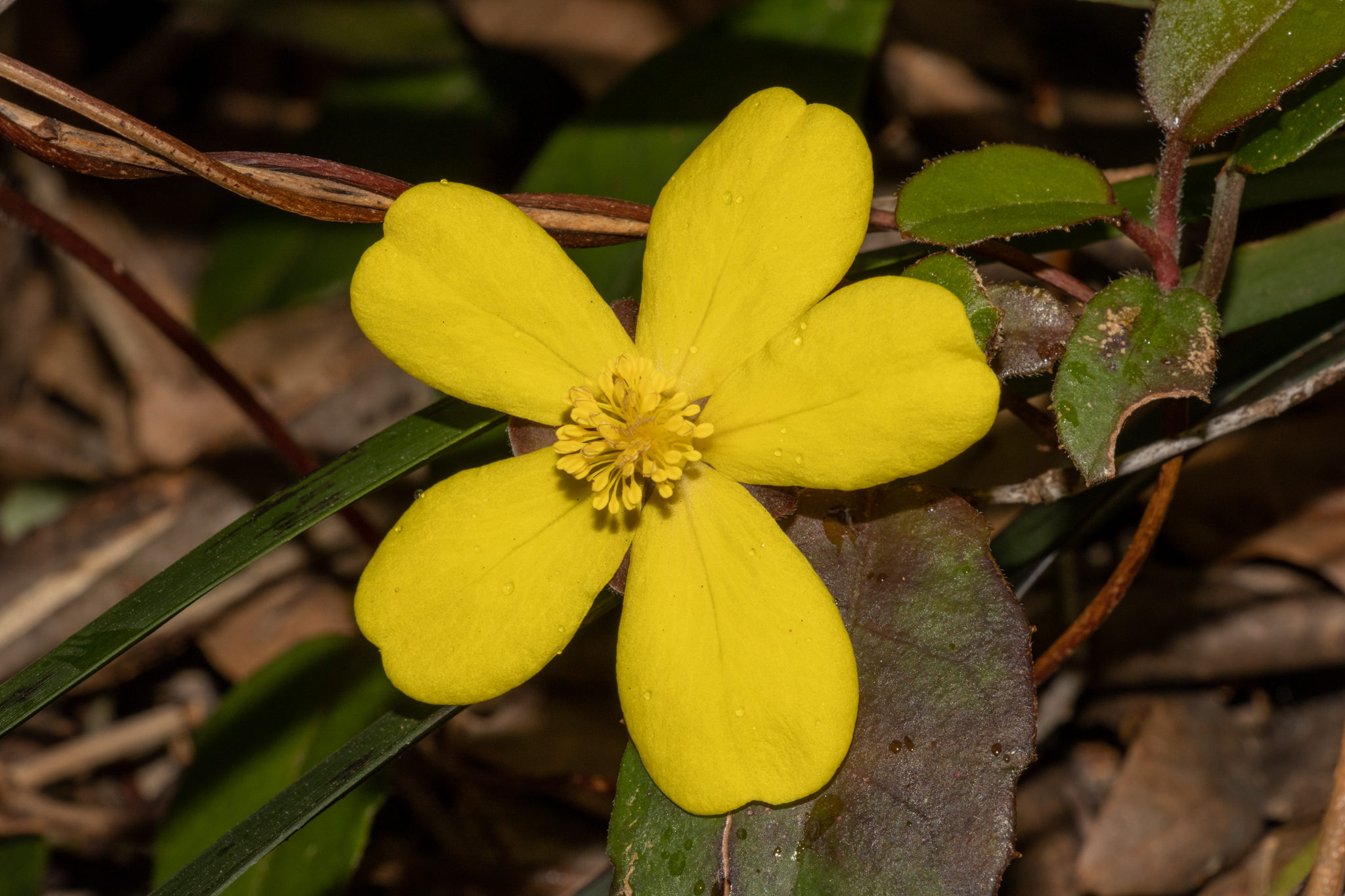
Hibbertia dentata

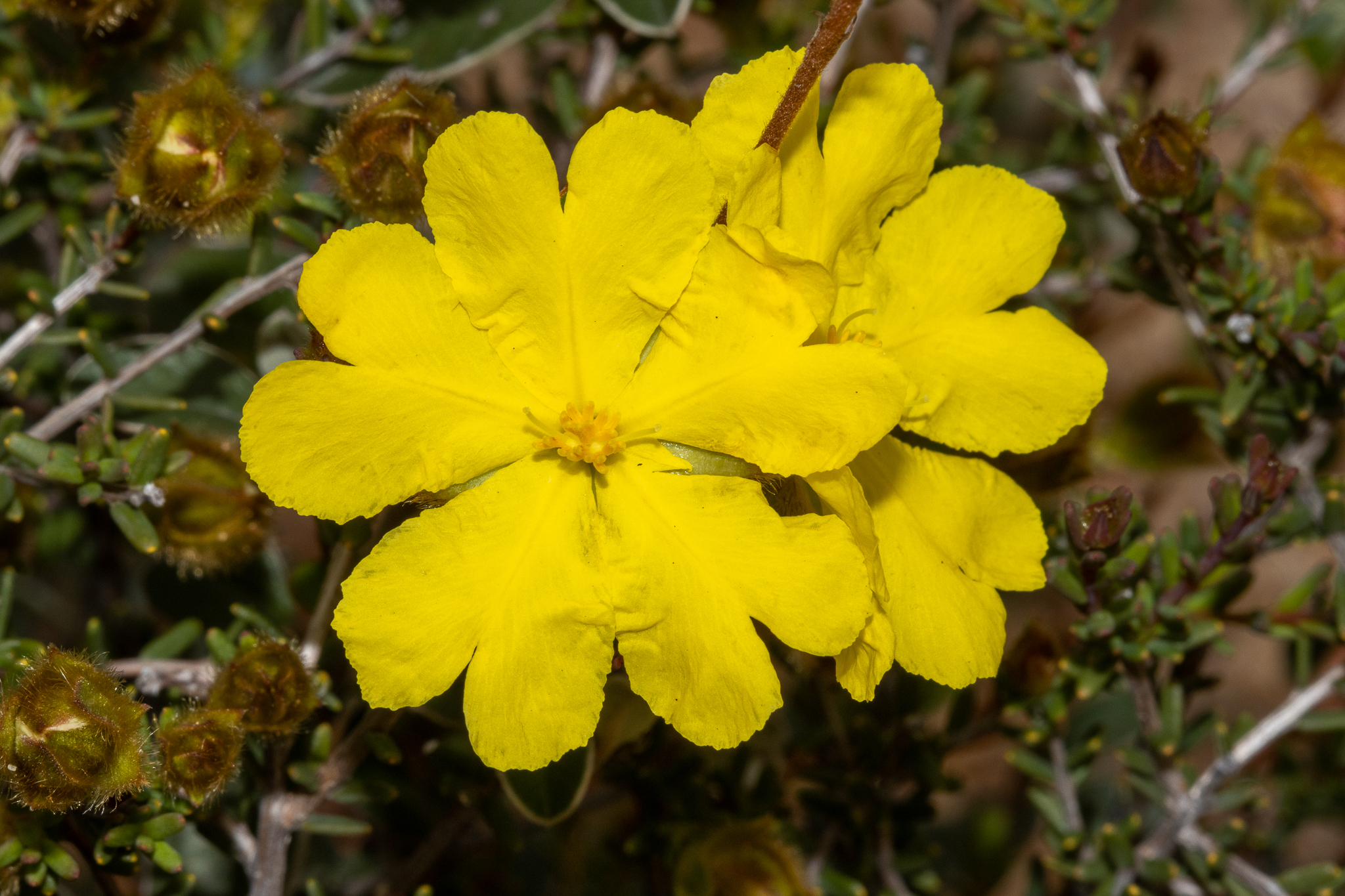
Hibbertia drummondii

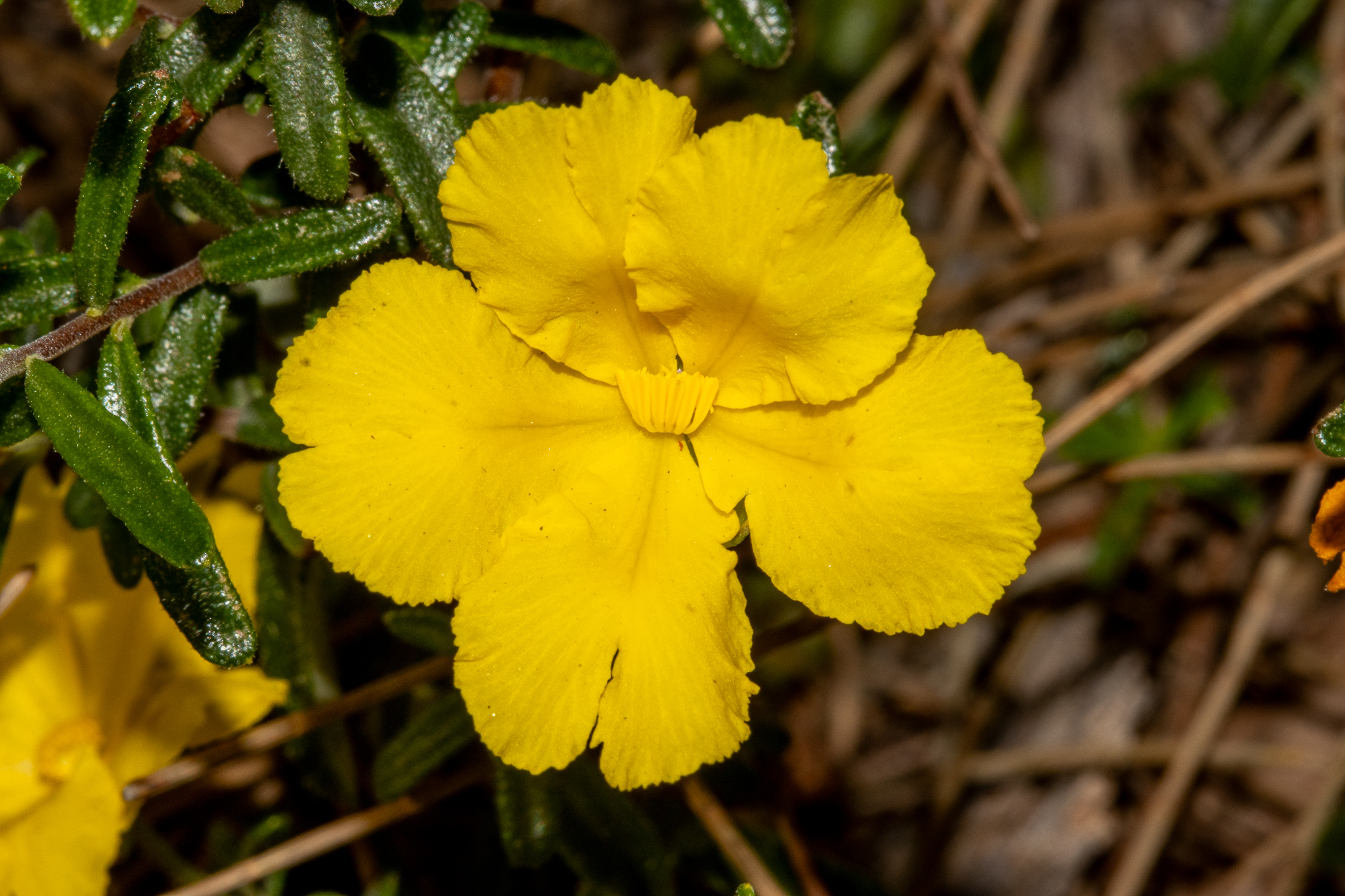
Hibbertia hypericoides

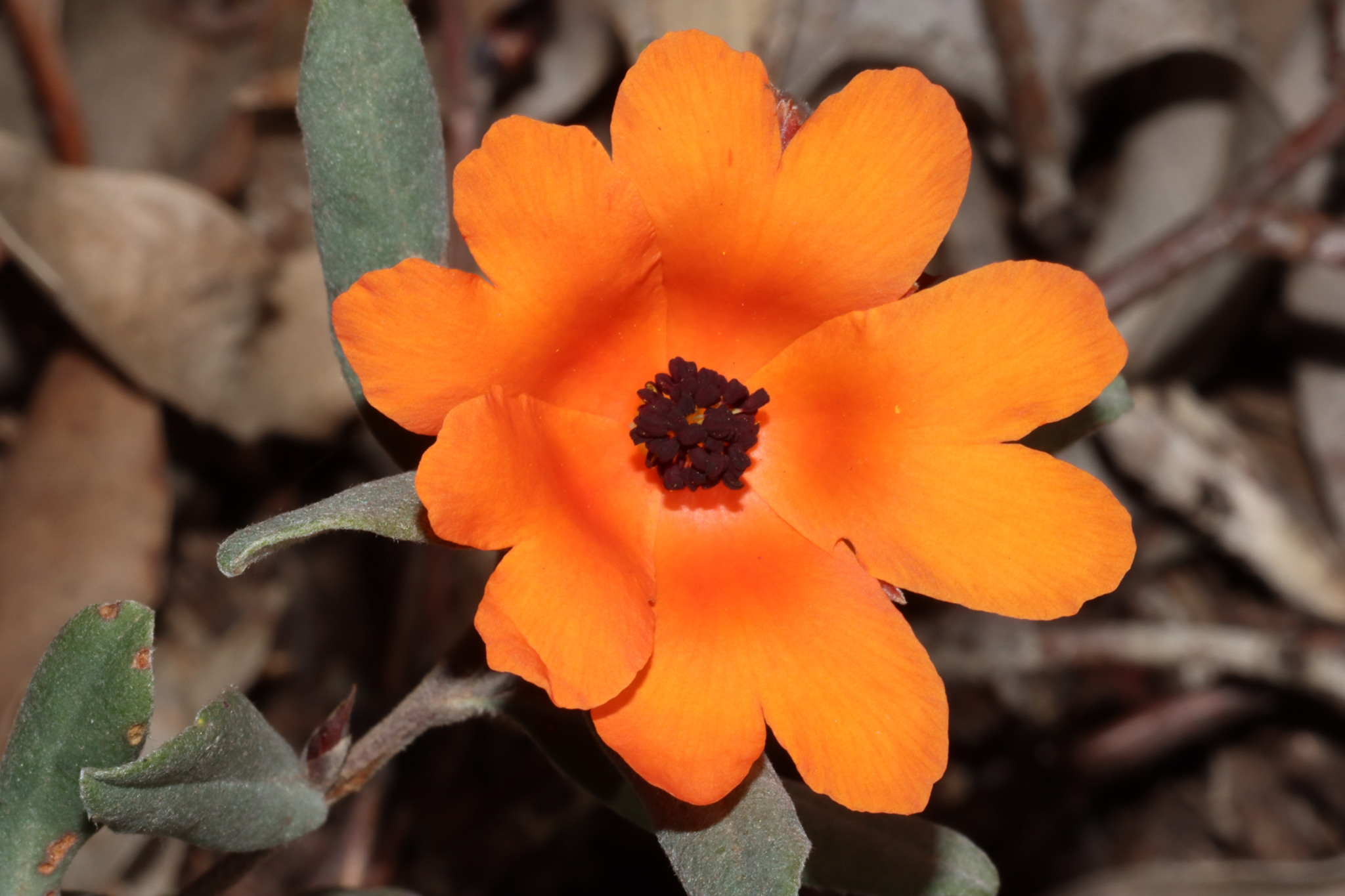
Hibbertia miniata

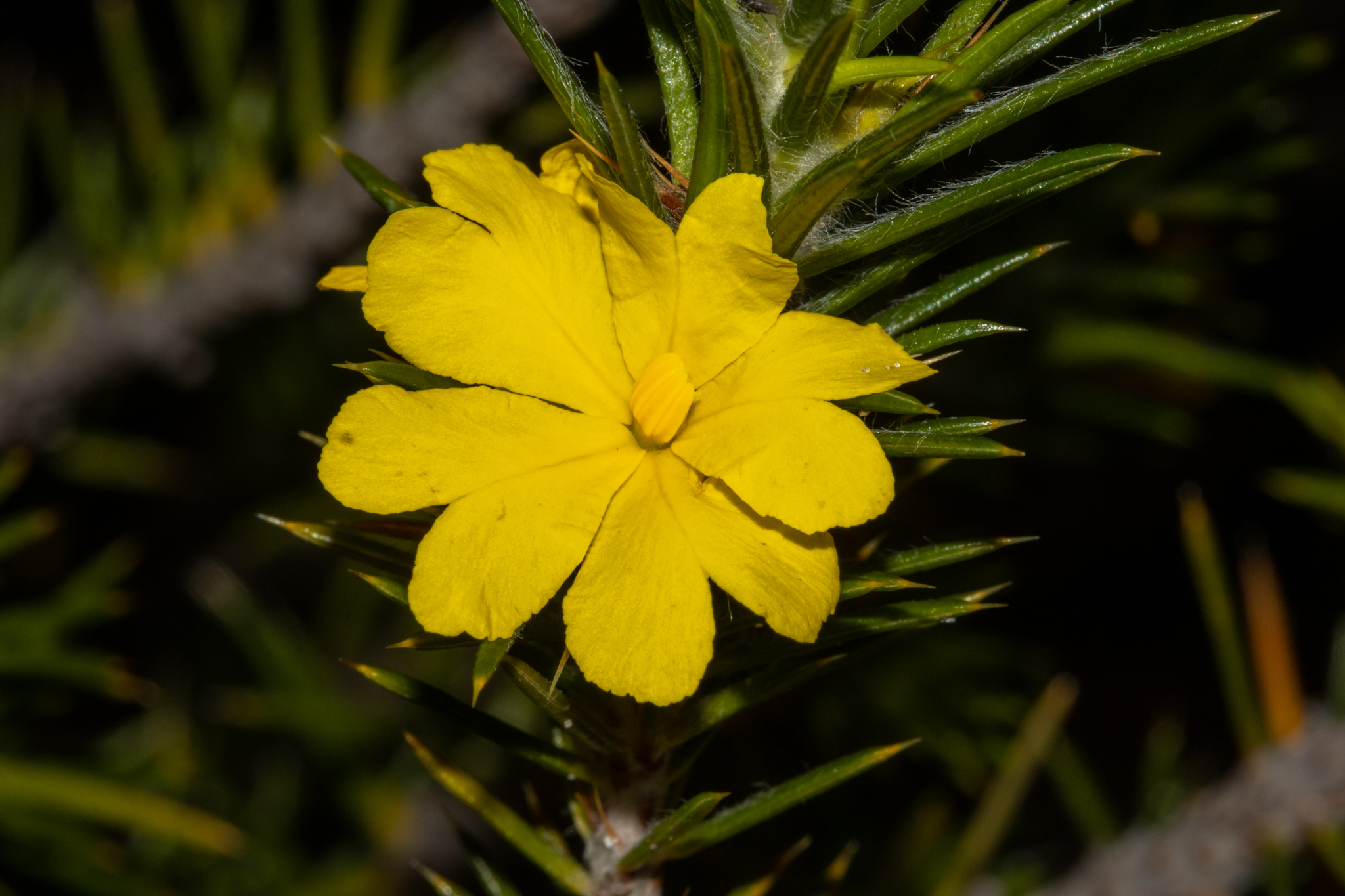
Hibbertia mucronata

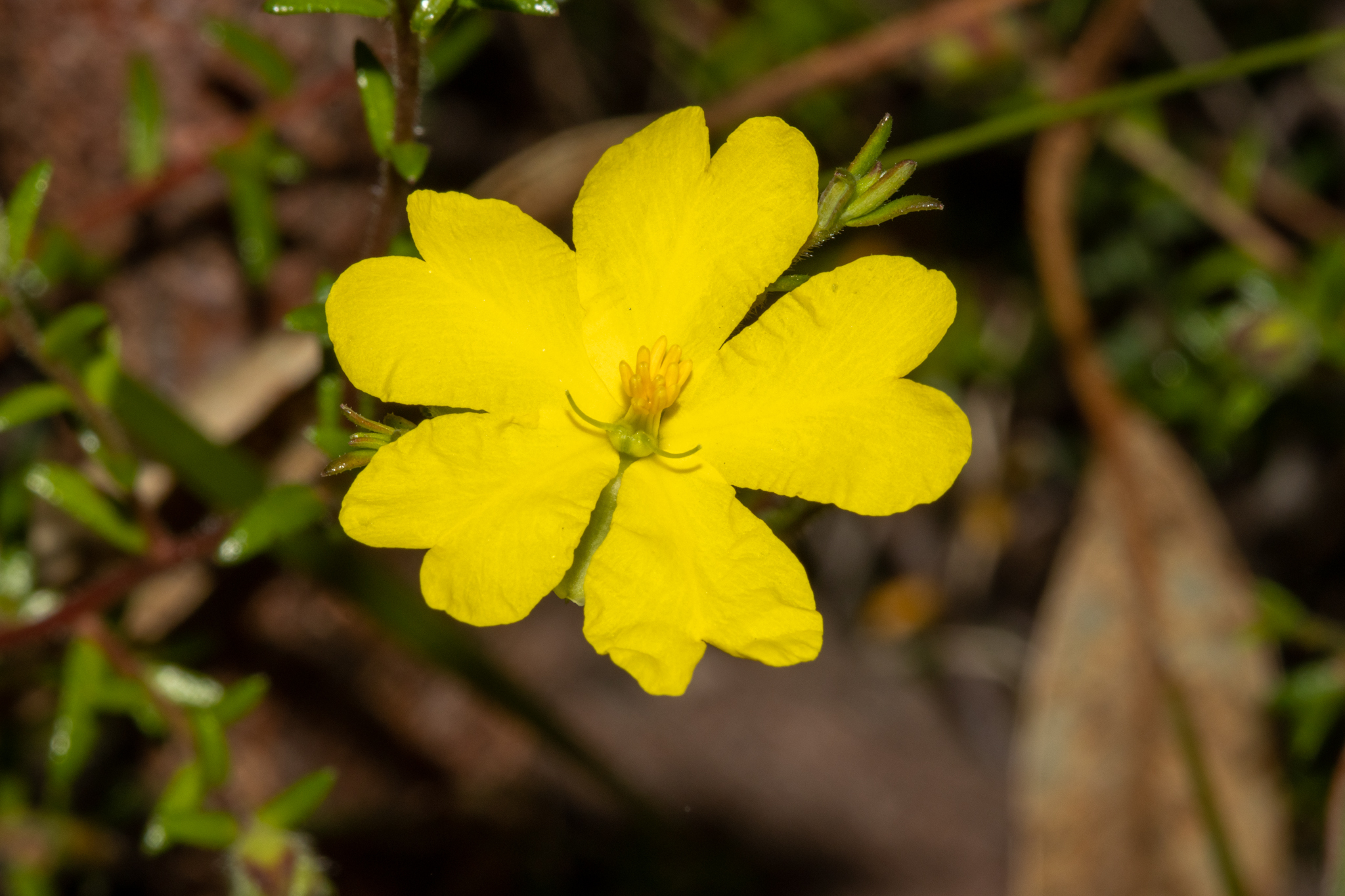
Hibbertia puberula

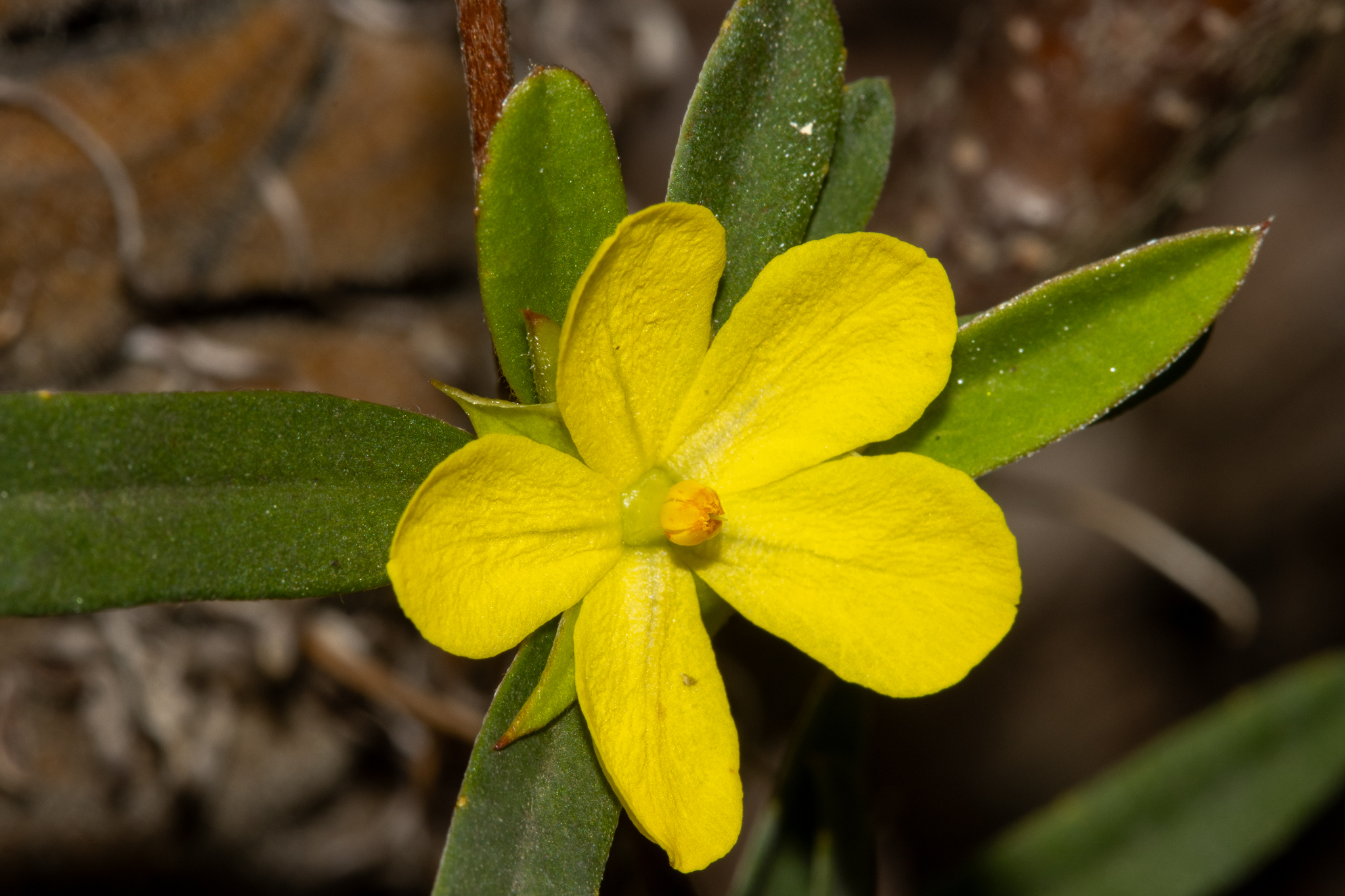
Hibbertia salicifolia

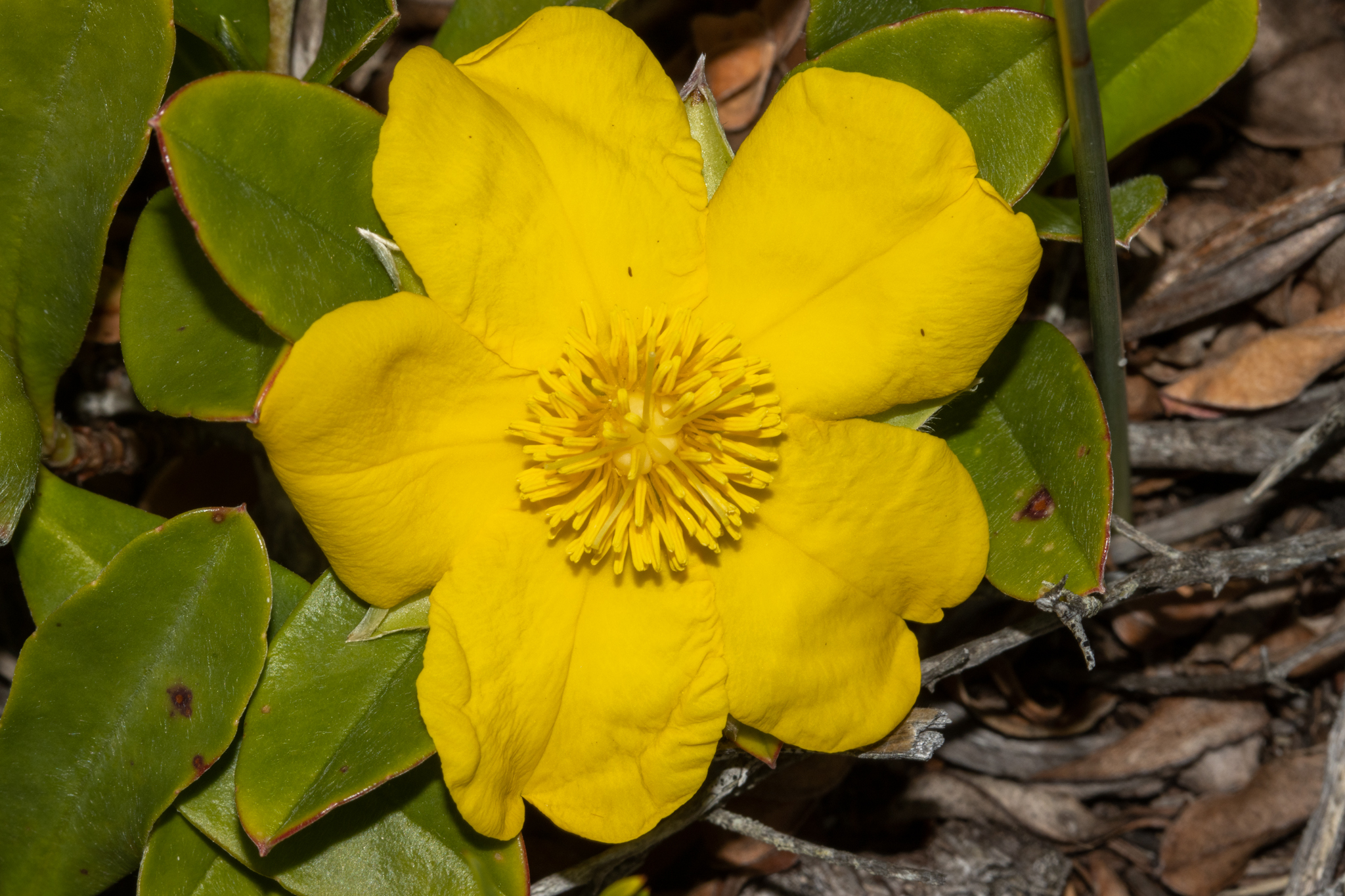
Hibbertia scandens

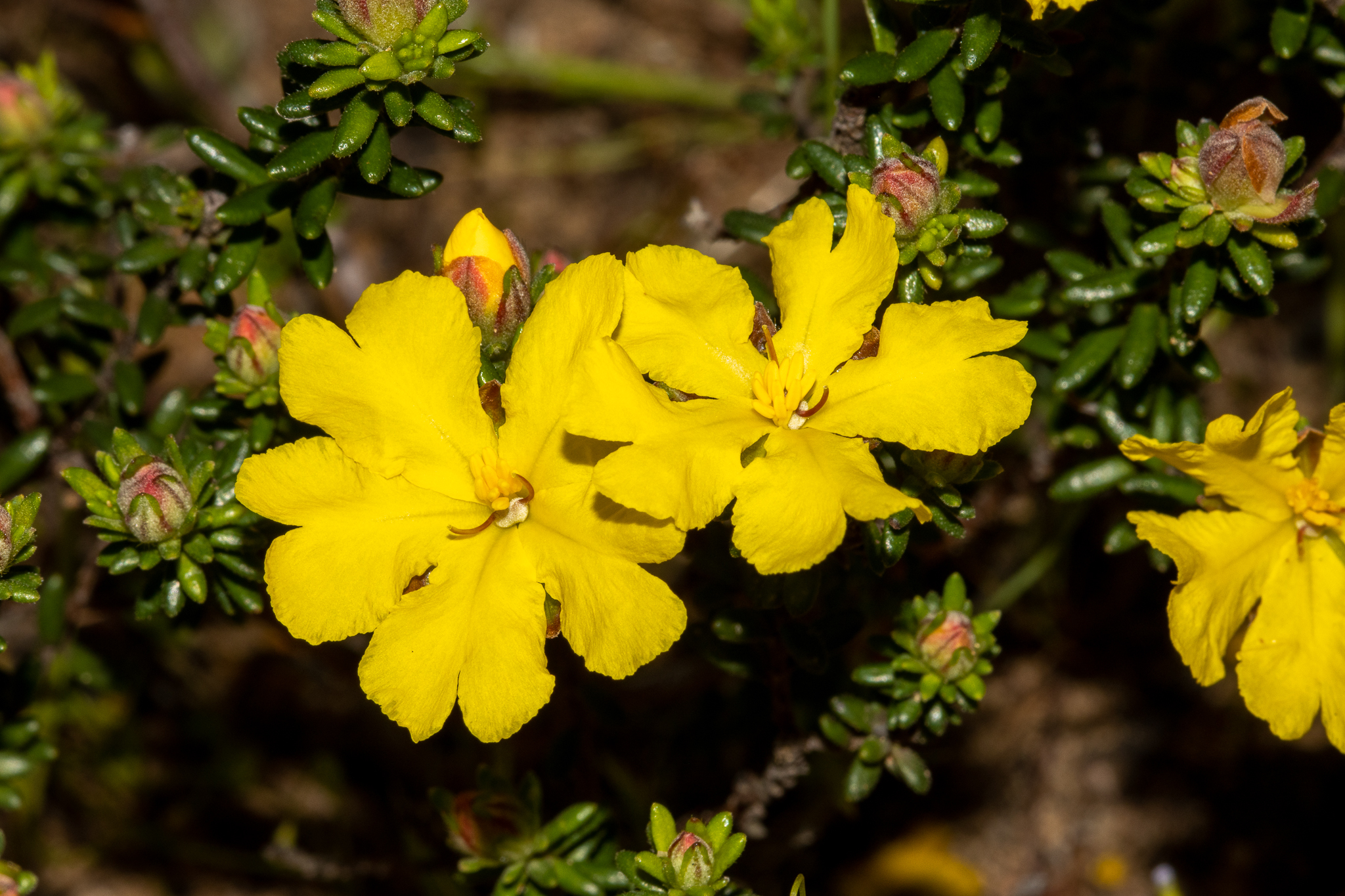
Hibbertia sericea

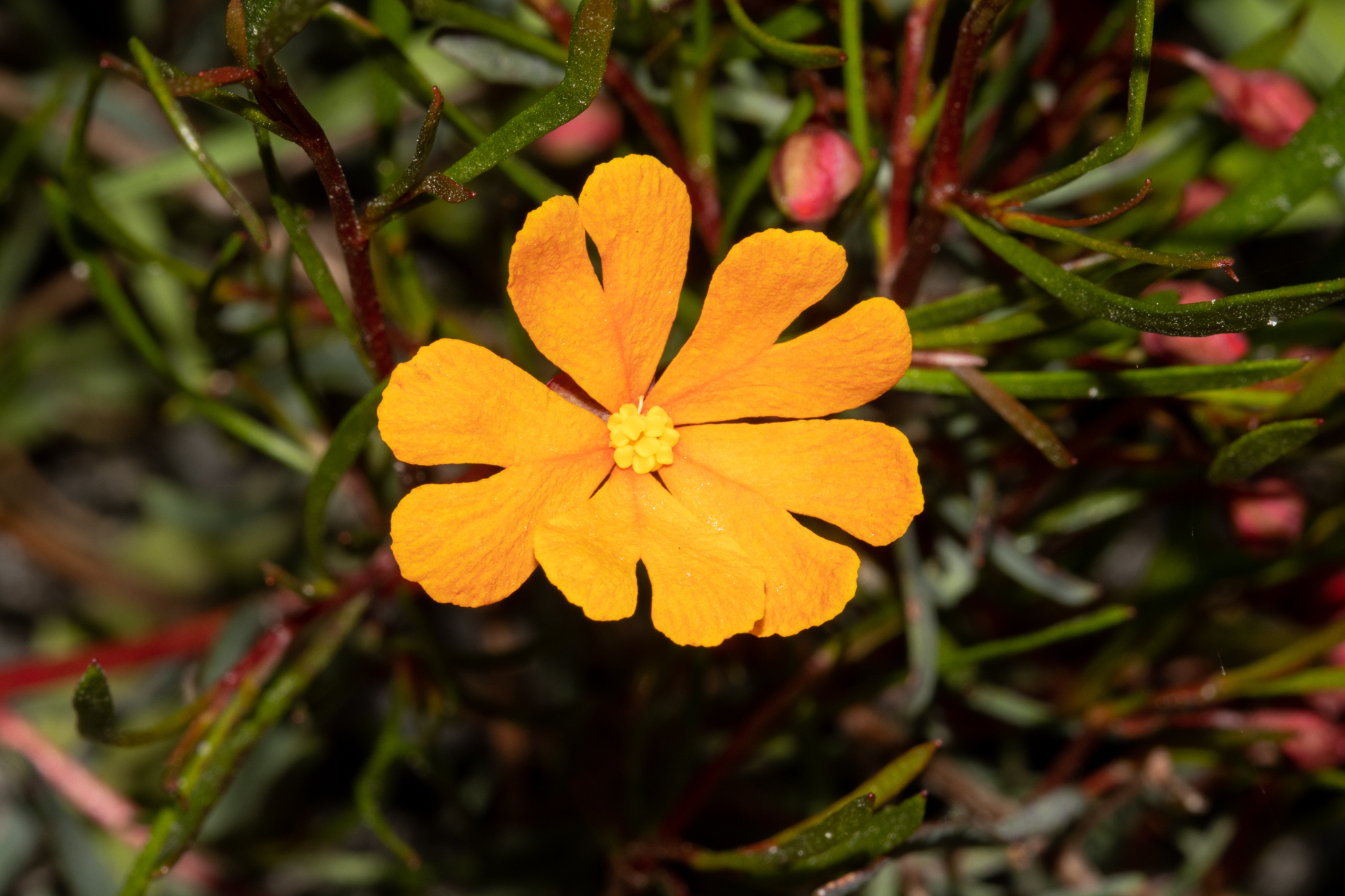
Hibbertia stellaris

- Hibbertia abyssus Wege & K.R.Thiele – Bandalup buttercup (W.A.)
- Hibbertia acaulothrix Toelken (N.S.W.)
- Hibbertia acerosa (R.Br. ex DC.) Benth. – needle-leaved guinea flower (W.A.)
- Hibbertia acicularis (Labill.) F.Muell. – prickly guinea-flower (Qld., N.S.W., Vic., Tas.)
- Hibbertia acrotoma Toelken (W.A.)
- Hibbertia acrotrichion J.R.Wheeler (W.A.)
- Hibbertia acuminata B.J.Conn (N.S.W., Qld.)
- Hibbertia acutifolia (Toelken) T.Hammer (N.S.W.)
- Hibbertia advena T.Hammer & Toelken (Qld.)
- Hibbertia alopecota Toelken (N.T.)
- Hibbertia altigena Schltr. (New Caledonia)
- Hibbertia ambita K.R.Thiele (W.A.)
- Hibbertia amplexicaulis Steud. (W.A.)
- Hibbertia ancistrophylla J.R.Wheeler (W.A.)
- Hibbertia ancistrotricha J.R.Wheeler (W.A.)
- Hibbertia andrewsiana Domin (W.A.)
- Hibbertia androsaemoides Diels (Qld.)
- Hibbertia angulata Toelken (N.T.)
- Hibbertia angustinervis (Toelken) T.Hammer (N.S.W.)
- Hibbertia appressa Toelken – trailing guinea flower (Vic., Tas.)
- Hibbertia araneolifera Toelken (Qld.)
- Hibbertia archeri T.Hammer & K.R.Thiele (W.A.)
- Hibbertia arcuata J.R.Wheeler (W.A.)
- Hibbertia arenaraia Toelken (N.S.W.)
- Hibbertia arenicola K.R.Thiele (W.A.)
- Hibbertia argentea Steud. (W.A.)
- Hibbertia arguta Toelken (Qld.)
- Hibbertia argyrochiton Toelken (N.T.)
- Hibbertia aristibracteata Toelken (N.S.W.)
- Hibbertia aristisepala Toelken (Qld.)
- Hibbertia armata Toelken (N.S.W.)
- Hibbertia arnhemica S.T.Reynolds (N.T.)
- Hibbertia aspera DC. – rough guinea-flower (Qld., N.S.W., Vic.)
  - Hibbertia aspera subsp. pilosifolia Toelken
  - Hibbertia aspera DC. subsp. aspera
- Hibbertia asterella Toelken (W.A.)
- Hibbertia atrichosepala Wege & K.R.Thiele (W.A.)
- Hibbertia aurea Steud. (W.A.)
- Hibbertia auriculiflora Toelken (N.T.)
  - Hibbertia auriculiflora Toelken subsp. auriculiflora
  - Hibbertia auriculiflora subsp. minor Toelken
- Hibbertia australis N.A.Wakef. (Vic., S.A.)
- Hibbertia avonensis J.R.Wheeler (W.A.)
- Hibbertia axillaris Toelken (W.A.)
- Hibbertia axillibarba J.R.Wheeler (W.A.)
- Hibbertia banksii (R.Br. ex DC.) Benth. (Qld., New Guinea)
  - Hibbertia banksii (R.Br. ex DC.) Benth. subsp. banksii (Qld.)
  - Hibbertia banksii subsp. sparsidentata Toelken (Qld., New Guinea)
- Hibbertia barrettiae K.R.Thiele (W.A.)
- Hibbertia basaltica A.M.Buchanan & Schah. (Tas.)
- Hibbertia baudouinii Brongn. & Gris (New Caledonia)
- Hibbertia bicarpellata Toelken (Qld.)
- Hibbertia bistrata (J.R.Wheeler) K.R.Thiele & T.Hammer (W.A.)
- Hibbertia bouletii Veillon (New Caledonia)
- Hibbertia bracteata (R.Br. ex DC.) Benth. (N.S.W.)
- Hibbertia brennanii Toelken (N.T.)
- Hibbertia brevipedunculata Toelken (W.A., N.T.)
- Hibbertia brownii Benth. (N.T.)
- Hibbertia cactifolia Toelken (N.T.)
- Hibbertia callida K.R.Thiele (W.A.)
- Hibbertia calycina (DC.) N.A.Wakef. – lesser guinea flower (N.S.W., A.C.T., Vic., Tas.)
- Hibbertia candicans (Hook.) Benth. (N.T., Qld.)
- Hibbertia capensis K.R.Thiele (W.A.)
- Hibbertia carinata J.R.Wheeler (W.A.)
- Hibbertia carnarvonensis Toelken (Qld.)
- Hibbertia caudice Toelken (N.T., Qld.)
- Hibbertia charlesii J.R.Wheeler (W.A.)
- Hibbertia chartacea J.R.Wheeler (W.A.)
- Hibbertia ciliolata Toelken (N.T.)
- Hibbertia cinerea (R.Br. ex DC.) Toelken (S.A.)
- Hibbertia circinata K.L.McDougall & G.T.Wright (N.S.W.)
- Hibbertia circularis Toelken (N.T.)
- Hibbertia circumdans B.J.Conn (N.S.W.)
- Hibbertia cistiflora N.A.Wakef. (N.S.W., Vic.)
  - Hibbertia cistiflora Toelken subsp. cistiflora
  - Hibbertia cistiflora subsp. quadristaminea Toelken
  - Hibbertia cistiflora subsp. rostrata Toelken
- Hibbertia cistifolia R.Br. ex DC. (N.T., Qld.)
- Hibbertia cistoidea (Hook.) C.T.White (N.S.W., Qld.)
- Hibbertia cockertoniana K.R.Thiele (W.A.)
- Hibbertia coloensis Toelken (N.S.W.)
- Hibbertia commutata Steud. (W.A.)
- Hibbertia complanata (R.Br. ex DC.) J.W.Horn (N.T.)
- Hibbertia comptonii Baker f. (New Caledonia)
- Hibbertia concinna F.M.Bailey (Qld.)
- Hibbertia conferta Toelken (N.S.W.)
- Hibbertia conspicua (J.Drumm. ex Harv.) Gilg – leafless hibbertia (W.A.)
- Hibbertia coriacea (Pers.) Baill. (Madagascar)
- Hibbertia covenyana B.J.Conn (N.S.W.)
- Hibbertia crassifolia (Turcz.) Benth. (W.A.)
- Hibbertia crassinervis Toelken (Qld.)
- Hibbertia cravenii J.W.Horn (N.T.)
- Hibbertia crinita Toelken (N.S.W., S.A., Vic.)
- Hibbertia crispula J.M.Black – Ooldea guinea flower (S.A., W.A.)
- Hibbertia cuneiformis (Labill.) Sm. – cut-leaf hibbertia (W.A.)
- Hibbertia cunninghamii Aiton ex Hook. (W.A.)
- Hibbertia cymosa S.T.Reynolds (Qld.)
- Hibbertia davisii K.R.Thiele (W.A.)
- Hibbertia dealbata (R.Br. ex DC.) Benth. (N.T., Qld.)
- Hibbertia decumbens Toelken (N.S.W.)
- Hibbertia demissa Toelken (N.S.W.)
- Hibbertia dentata DC. – twining guinea-flower (Qld., N.S.W., Vic.)
- Hibbertia depilipes K.R.Thiele (W.A.)
- Hibbertia deplancheana Bureaeu ex Guillamin (New Caledonia)
- Hibbertia depressa Steud. (W.A.)
- Hibbertia desmophylla (Benth.) F.Muell. (W.A.)
- Hibbertia devitata Toelken (Vic., S.A.)
- Hibbertia diamesogenos (Steud.) J.R.Wheeler (W.A.)
- Hibbertia diffusa R.Br. ex DC. – wedge guinea flower (Qld., N.S.W., Vic.)
- Hibbertia dilatata (Benth.) J.W.Horn (N.T.)
- Hibbertia dispar Toelken (N.S.W., Vic.)
- Hibbertia dracolithica K.R.Thiele (W.A.)
- Hibbertia drummondii (Turcz.) Gilg (W.A.)
- Hibbertia eatoniae Diels (W.A.)
- Hibbertia ebracteata Bureau ex Guillaumin (New Caledonia)
- Hibbertia echiifolia R.Br. ex Benth. (W.A.)
  - Hibbertia echiifolia subsp. cernua Toelken
  - Hibbertia echiifolia R.Br. ex Benth. subsp. echiifolia
  - Hibbertia echiifolia subsp. macrantha Toelken
  - Hibbertia echiifolia subsp. oligantha Toelken
  - Hibbertia echiifolia subsp. rotata Toelken
- Hibbertia eciliata Toelken (Qld.)
- Hibbertia elachophylla K.R.Thiele & T.Hammer (W.A.)
- Hibbertia elata Maiden & Betche (N.S.W., Qld.)
- Hibbertia elegans K.R.Thiele (W.A.)
- Hibbertia emarginata Guillaumin (New Caledonia)
- Hibbertia empetrifolia (DC.) Hoogland – trailing guinea-flower (Qld., N.S.W., Vic., S.A., Tas.)
- Hibbertia epeduncularis Toelken (Qld.)
- Hibbertia ericifolia Hook.f. (N.S.W., Vic., Tas.)
- Hibbertia erioclada K.R.Thiele (W.A.)
- Hibbertia exasperata (Steud.) Briq. (W.A.)
- Hibbertia expansa Toelken (Qld., N.S.W.)
- Hibbertia exponens Toelken (Vic.)
- Hibbertia exposita Toelken (Vic.)
- Hibbertia extrorsa Toelken (N.T.)
- Hibbertia exutiacies N.A.Wakef. (S.A., Qld., Vic.)
- Hibbertia fasciculata R.Br. ex DC. (N.S.W., Qld., S.A., Vic.)
- Hibbertia fasciculiflora K.R.Thiele (W.A.)
- Hibbertia favieri Veillon (New Caledonia)
- Hibbertia ferox Jackes
- Hibbertia ferruginea J.R.Wheeler (W.A.)
- Hibbertia filifolia Toelken (N.S.W., Qld.)
- Hibbertia fitzgeraldensis J.R.Wheeler (W.A.)
- Hibbertia florida Toelken (N.S.W.)
- Hibbertia fractiflexa Toelken (N.T.)
  - Hibbertia fractiflexa subsp. filicaulis Toelken
  - Hibbertia fractiflexa subsp. fractiflexa Toelken
  - Hibbertia fractiflexa subsp. serotina Toelken
- Hibbertia fruticosa Toelken (N.S.W.)
  - Hibbertia fruticosa Toelken subsp. fruticosa
  - Hibbertia fruticosa subsp. pilligaensis Toelken
- Hibbertia fulva T.Hammer (N.T.)
- Hibbertia fumana Sieber ex Toelken (N.S.W.)
- Hibbertia furfuracea (R.Br. ex DC.) Benth. (W.A.)
- Hibbertia glaberrima F.Muell. (W.A., N.T., S.A.)
- Hibbertia glabrisepala J.R.Wheeler (W.A.)
- Hibbertia glabriuscula J.R.Wheeler (W.A.)
- Hibbertia glaucophylla (Steud.) K.R.Thiele & T.Hammer (W.A.)
- Hibbertia glebosa Toelken (S.A.)
  - Hibbertia glebosa subsp. glebosa Toelken
  - Hibbertia glebosa subsp. oblonga (J.M.Black) Toelken
- Hibbertia glomerata Benth. (W.A.)
  - Hibbertia glomerata subsp. darlingensis J.R.Wheeler
  - Hibbertia glomerata subsp. ginginensis J.R.Wheeler
  - Hibbertia glomerata Benth. subsp. glomerata
- Hibbertia glomerosa (Benth.) F.Muell. (W.A.)
- Hibbertia goyderi F.Muell. (N.T.)
- Hibbertia gracilipes Benth. (W.A.)
- Hibbertia graniticola J.R.Wheeler (W.A.)
- Hibbertia grossulariifolia (Salisb.) Salisb. – gooseberry-leaved guinea-flower (W.A.)
- Hibbertia guttata Toelken (N.T.)
- Hibbertia hamulosa J.R.Wheeler (W.A.)
- Hibbertia hapalophylla K.R.Thiele & T.Hammer (W.A.)
- Hibbertia haplostemona J.W.Horn (N.T.)
- Hibbertia helianthemoides (Turcz.) F.Muell. (W.A.)
- Hibbertia hemignosta (Steud.) J.R.Wheeler (W.A.)
- Hibbertia hendersonii S.T.Reynolds (Qld.)
- Hibbertia hermanniifolia DC. (N.S.W., Vic.)
  - Hibbertia hermanniifolia DC. subsp. hermanniifolia
  - Hibbertia hermanniifolia subsp. recondita Toelken
- Hibbertia hesperia T.Hammer (W.A.)
- Hibbertia heterotricha Bureau ex Guillaumin (New Caledonia)
- Hibbertia hexandra C.T.White – tree guinea flower (N.S.W., Qld.)
- Hibbertia hibbertioides (Steud.) J.R.Wheeler (W.A.)
- Hibbertia hirsuta (Hook.) Benth. (S.A., Tas.)
- Hibbertia hirta Toelken (N.S.W.)
- Hibbertia hirticalyx Toelken (Vic., Tas.)
- Hibbertia holtzei F.Muell. (N.T.)
- Hibbertia hooglandii J.R.Wheeler (W.A.)
- Hibbertia horricomis Toelken (N.S.W.)
- Hibbertia hortiorum K.R.Thiele (W.A.)
- Hibbertia huegelii (Benth.) F.Muell. (W.A.)
- Hibbertia humifusa F.Muell. (Vic.)
  - Hibbertia humifusa subsp. debilis Toelken
  - Hibbertia humifusa subsp. erigens Toelken
  - Hibbertia humifusa Toelken subsp. humifusa
- Hibbertia humilis K.R.Thiele (W.A.)
- Hibbertia hypericoides (DC.) Benth. – yellow buttercups (W.A.)
  - Hibbertia hypericoides (DC.) Benth. subsp. hypericoides
  - Hibbertia hypericoides subsp. septentrionalis K.R.Thiele & Cockerton
- Hibbertia improna K.R.Thiele
- Hibbertia incana (Lindl.) Toelken - prickly guinea-flower (Vic.)
- Hibbertia inclusa Benth. (W.A.)
- Hibbertia incompta Toelken (N.T.)
- Hibbertia inconspicua Ostenf. (W.A.)
- Hibbertia incrassata Toelken (Qld.)
- Hibbertia incurvata Toelken (N.T.)
- Hibbertia inopinata K.R.Thiele (W.A.)
- Hibbertia intermedia (DC.) Toelken (N.S.W.)
- Hibbertia juncea (Benth.) J.W.Horn (N.T.)
- Hibbertia juniperina (Turcz.) K.R.Thiele (W.A.)
- Hibbertia kaputarensis B.J.Conn (N.S.W.)
- Hibbertia lagarophylla Toelken (N.T.)
- Hibbertia lanceolata Bureau ex Guillaumin (New Caledonia)
- Hibbertia lanulipes K.R.Thiele (W.A.)
- Hibbertia lasiopus Benth. (W.A.)
- Hibbertia laurana S.T.Reynolds (Qld.)
- Hibbertia ledifolia Benth. (W.A.)
- Hibbertia lepidocalyx J.R.Wheeler (W.A.)
  - Hibbertia lepidocalyx J.R.Wheeler subsp. lepidocalyx
  - Hibbertia lepidocalyx subsp. tuberculata J.R.Wheeler
- Hibbertia lepidota R.Br. ex DC. (W.A., N.T., Qld.)
- Hibbertia leptophylla K.R.Thiele (W.A.)
- Hibbertia leptopus Benth. (W.A.)
- Hibbertia leptotheca (J.R.Wheeler) K.R.Thiele (W.A.)
- Hibbertia leucocrossa K.R.Thiele (W.A.)
- Hibbertia lignescens Toelken (N.S.W.)
- Hibbertia ligulata Toelken (N.T.)
- Hibbertia linearis R.Br. ex DC. (N.S.W., Qld.)
- Hibbertia lineata Steud. (W.A.)
- Hibbertia lividula J.R.Wheeler (W.A.)
- Hibbertia longifolia F.Muell. (Qld.)
- Hibbertia lucens Brongn. & Gris ex Sebert & Pancher (New Caledonia, Fiji)
- Hibbertia malacophylla Toelken (Qld.)
- Hibbertia malleolacea Toelken (N.T.)
- Hibbertia margaretiae Veillon (New Caledonia)
- Hibbertia marginata B.J.Conn – bordered guinea flower (N.S.W)
- Hibbertia marrawalina Toelken (N.T.)
- Hibbertia mathinnicola Wapstra (Tas.)
- Hibbertia mediterranea Toelken (Qld.)
- Hibbertia melhanioides F.Muell. (Qld.)
- Hibbertia meridionalis (J.R.Wheeler) T.Hammer & K.R.Thiele (W.A.)
- Hibbertia micrantha K.R.Thiele & T.Hammer (W.A.)
- Hibbertia microphylla Steud. (W.A.)
- Hibbertia miniata C.A.Gardner – orange hibbertia (W.A.)
- Hibbertia minima Toelken (Qld.)
- Hibbertia minysantha Toelken (N.S.W., Qld.)
- Hibbertia mollis Toelken (W.A.)
- Hibbertia monogyna R.Br. ex DC. (N.S.W., Vic.)
- Hibbertia montana Steud. (W.A.)
- Hibbertia monticola Stanley (Qld.)
- Hibbertia moratii Veillon (New Caledonia)
- Hibbertia mucronata (Turcz.) Benth. – prickly hibbertia (W.A.)
- Hibbertia muelleri Benth. (N.T.)
- Hibbertia mulligana S.T.Reynolds (Qld.)
- Hibbertia mylnei Benth. (W.A.)
- Hibbertia nana Däniker (New Caledonia)
- Hibbertia nemorosa Toelken (Qld.)
- Hibbertia nitida (R.Br. ex DC.) Benth. (N.S.W.)
- Hibbertia notabilis Toelken – Howe guinea-flower (N.S.W., Vic.)
- Hibbertia notibractea J.R.Wheeler (W.A.)
- Hibbertia nutans Benth. – nodding guinea-flower (W.A.)
- Hibbertia nymphaea Diels (W.A.)
- Hibbertia oblongata R.Br. ex DC. (N.T., W.A.)
  - Hibbertia oblongata subsp. brevifolia Toelken (N.T., W.A.)
  - Hibbertia oblongata subsp. macrophylla Toelken (W.A.)
  - Hibbertia oblongata subsp. megalanthera Toelken (W.A.)
  - Hibbertia oblongata Toelken subsp. oblongata (W.A.)
- Hibbertia obtusibracteata Toelken (S.A.)
- Hibbertia obtusifolia DC. – hoary guinea-flower (N.S.W., A.C.T., Qld., Vic., Tas.)
- Hibbertia octandra Toelken (Qld.)
- Hibbertia oligantha J.R.Wheeler (W.A.)
- Hibbertia oligocarpa Toelken (N.T.)
- Hibbertia oligodonta S.T.Reynolds (Qld.)
- Hibbertia orbicularis Toelken (N.T.)
- Hibbertia orientalis Toelken (N.T.)
- Hibbertia ovata Steud. (W.A.)
- Hibbertia oxycraspedota Toelken & R.T.Mill. (N.S.W.)
- Hibbertia pachynemidium Toelken (N.S.W.)
- Hibbertia pachyphylla J.R.Wheeler (W.A.)
- Hibbertia paeninsularis J.M.Black (S.A.)
- Hibbertia pallidiflora Toelken (S.A., Vic.)
- Hibbertia pancerea Toelken (N.T.)
- Hibbertia pancheri (Brongn. & Gris) Briq. (New Caledonia)
- Hibbertia papillata J.R.Wheeler (W.A.)
- Hibbertia paranthera K.R.Thiele (W.A.)
- Hibbertia parvifolia Toelken (N.S.W.)
- Hibbertia parvula K.R.Thiele (W.A.)
- Hibbertia patens Toelken (Qld.)
- Hibbertia patula Guillaumin (New Caledonia)
- Hibbertia pedunculata R.Br. ex DC. (N.S.W.)
- Hibbertia pendula T.Hammer (N.T.)
- Hibbertia perfoliata Hügel ex Endl. (W.A.)
- Hibbertia perhamata Toelken (N.S.W.)
- Hibbertia persquamata Toelken (W.A., N.T.)
  - Hibbertia persquamata subsp. ampliata Toelken
  - Hibbertia persquamata subsp. persquamata Toelken
- Hibbertia pholidota S.T.Reynolds (Qld.)
- Hibbertia pilifera Toelken (N.S.W.)
- Hibbertia pilosa Steud. – hairy guinea-flower (W.A.)
- Hibbertia pilulis Toelken (N.T.)
- Hibbertia planifolia Toelken (N.S.W.)
- Hibbertia platyphylla Toelken (S.A.)
  - Hibbertia platyphylla subsp. halmaturina Toelken
  - Hibbertia platyphylla subsp. major Toelken
  - Hibbertia platyphylla subsp. platyphylla Toelken
- Hibbertia podocarpifolia Schltr. (New Caledonia)
- Hibbertia polyancistra K.R.Thiele (W.A.)
- Hibbertia polystachya Benth. (W.A.)
- Hibbertia porcata Toelken (N.S.W., Vic.)
- Hibbertia porongurupensis J.R.Wheeler & Hoogland (W.A.)
- Hibbertia potentilliflora F.Muell. ex Benth. (W.A.)
- Hibbertia praemorsa Toelken (N.S.W.)
- Hibbertia praestans (Craven & Dunlop) J.W.Horn (N.T.)
- Hibbertia priceana J.R.Wheeler (W.A.)
- Hibbertia proberae K.R.Thiele (W.A.)
- Hibbertia procumbens (Labill.) DC. (Tas., Vic., N.S.W.)
- Hibbertia prolata K.R.Thiele (W.A.)
- Hibbertia propinqua K.R.Thiele (W.A.)
- Hibbertia prorufa Toelken (N.S.W.)
- Hibbertia prostrata Hook. (S.A., Vic., Tas.)
- Hibbertia psilocarpa J.R.Wheeler (W.A.
- Hibbertia pubens K.R.Thiele (W.A.)
- Hibbertia puberula Toelken (N.S.W.)
  - Hibbertia puberula Toelken subsp. extensa Toelken
  - Hibbertia puberula Toelken subsp. glabrescens Toelken
  - Hibbertia puberula Toelken subsp. puberula
- Hibbertia pulchella (Brongn. & Gris) Schltr. (New Caledonia)
- Hibbertia pulchra Ostenf. (W.A.)
  - Hibbertia pulchra var. acutibractea J.R.Wheeler
  - Hibbertia pulchra var. crassinervia J.R.Wheeler
  - Hibbertia pulchra Ostenf. var. pulchra
- Hibbertia pungens Benth. (W.A.)
- Hibbertia pustulata Toelken (N.S.W.)
- Hibbertia pustulifolia Toelken & R.T.Mill. (N.S.W.)
- Hibbertia quadricolor Domin (W.A.)
- Hibbertia racemosa (Endl.) Gilg – stalked guinea-flower (W.A.)
- Hibbertia radians (Toelken) T.Hammer (S.A.)
- Hibbertia rasilis Toelken (N.S.W.)
- Hibbertia remanens K.R.Thiele & T.Hammer (W.A.)
- Hibbertia reticulata Toelken (Qld.)
- Hibbertia rhynchocalyx Toelken (N.S.W.)
- Hibbertia riparia (R.Br. ex DC.) Hoogland – erect guinea-flower (Qld., N.S.W., Vic., Tas.)
- Hibbertia robur K.R.Thiele (W.A.)
- Hibbertia rostellata Turcz. (W.A.)
- Hibbertia rubescens Vieill. ex Guillaumin (New Caledonia)
- Hibbertia rufa N.A.Wakef. – brown guinea flower (N.S.W., Vic., Tas.)
- Hibbertia rufociliata Toelken (Qld.)
- Hibbertia salicifolia (DC.) F.Muell. (N.S.W., Qld.)
- Hibbertia saligna R.Br. ex DC. (N.S.W.)
- Hibbertia samaria Toelken (N.S.W.)
- Hibbertia sandifordiae K.R.Thiele (W.A.)
- Hibbertia scabra R.Br. ex Benth. (N.T.)
- Hibbertia scabrifolia Toelken (W.A.)
- Hibbertia scandens (Willd.) Dryand. – climbing guinea-flower or snake vine (N.S.W., Qld., New Guinea)
  - Hibbertia scandens var. glabra (Maiden) C.T.White
  - Hibbertia scandens var. oxyphylla Domin
  - Hibbertia scandens (Willd.) Dryand. var. scandens
- Hibbertia scopata Toelken (W.A.)
- Hibbertia scopulicola T.Hammer (N.T.)
- Hibbertia sejuncta K.R.Thiele & Nge (W.A.)
- Hibbertia selkii Keighery (W.A.)
- Hibbertia semipilosa K.R.Thiele (W.A.)
- Hibbertia sericea (R.Br. ex DC.) Benth. – silky guinea-flower (S.A., Vic., Tas. Qld.)
- Hibbertia sericosepala K.R.Thiele (W.A.)
- Hibbertia serpyllifolia R.Br. ex DC. (Qld.)
- Hibbertia serrata Hotchk. – serrate-leaved guinea-flower (W.A.)
- Hibbertia sessiliflora Toelken (S.A., Vic.)
- Hibbertia setifera Toelken (S.A., Vic.)
- Hibbertia silvestris Diels (W.A.)
- Hibbertia simkiniae K.R.Thiele (W.A.)
- Hibbertia simulans Toelken (N.S.W.)
- Hibbertia singularis Toelken (N.S.W.)
- Hibbertia solanifolia Toelken (N.T.)
- Hibbertia spanantha Toelken & A.F.Rob. – Julian's hibbertia (N.S.W.)
- Hibbertia spathulata N.A.Wakef. (N.S.W., Vic.)
  - Hibbertia spathulata N.A.Wakef. subsp. spathulata
  - Hibbertia spathulata subsp. pleioclada Toelken
- Hibbertia spectabilis K.R.Thiele (W.A.)
- Hibbertia sphenandra (F.Muell. & Tate) J.W.Horn (W.A., N.T.)
- Hibbertia spicata F.Muell. (W.A.)
- Hibbertia squarrosa K.R.Thiele (W.A.)
- Hibbertia stellaris Endl. – star guinea-flower, orange stars (W.A.)
- Hibbertia stelligera (C.T.White) Toelken (Qld.)
- Hibbertia stenophylla J.R.Wheeler (W.A.)
- Hibbertia stichodonta Toelken (N.S.W.)
- Hibbertia stirlingii C.T.White (Qld.)
- Hibbertia stowardii S.Moore (W.A.)
- Hibbertia striata (Steud.) K.R.Thiele (W.A.)
- Hibbertia stricta (DC.) R.Br. ex F.Muell. (N.S.W., Qld.)
  - Hibbertia stricta subsp. furculata Toelken
  - Hibbertia stricta (DC.) R.Br. ex F.Muell. subsp. stricta
- Hibbertia strigosa Toelken
- Hibbertia subglabra K.R.Thiele (W.A.)
- Hibbertia subvaginata (Steud.) F.Muell. (W.A.)
- Hibbertia subvillosa (Domin) K.R.Thiele & T.Hammer (W.A.)
- Hibbertia succuneata Toelken (N.S.W.)
- Hibbertia suffrutescens Toelken (W.A.)
- Hibbertia sulcata Toelken (N.T.)
- Hibbertia sulcinervis Toelken (N.S.W.)
- Hibbertia superans Toelken (N.S.W.)
- Hibbertia surcularis Toelken (N.S.W., Qld.)
- Hibbertia synandra F.Muell. (Qld.)
- Hibbertia taeniophylla Toelken (Qld.)
- Hibbertia tenuifolia Toelken (N.S.W., Qld.)
- Hibbertia tenuis Toelken & R.J.Bates (S.A.)
- Hibbertia tomentosa R.Br. ex DC. (N.T.)
- Hibbertia tontoutensis Guillaumin (New Caledonia)
- Hibbertia torulosa Toelken (Vic.)
- Hibbertia trachyphylla Schltr. (New Caledonia)
- Hibbertia trichocalyx J.R.Wheeler (W.A.)
- Hibbertia tricornis Toelken (N.T.)
- Hibbertia tridentata Toelken (N.T.)
- Hibbertia triquetra T.Hammer (N.T.)
- Hibbertia truncata Toelken – Port Campbell guinea-flower (Vic.)
- Hibbertia tuberculata K.R.Thiele (W.A.)
- Hibbertia tuberculipilosa Toelken (N.S.W.)
- Hibbertia turleyana J.R.Wheeler (W.A.)
- Hibbertia ulicifolia (Benth.) J.R.Wheeler (W.A.)
- Hibbertia uncinata (Benth.) F.Muell. (W.A.)
- Hibbertia vaginata (Benth.) F.Muell. (W.A.)
- Hibbertia velutina R.Br. ex Benth. (Qld.)
- Hibbertia verrucosa Benth. (W.A.)
- Hibbertia vestita A.Cunn. ex Benth. – hairy guinea-flower (Qld., N.S.W.)
  - Hibbertia vestita var. thymifolia Benth.
  - Hibbertia vestita Benth. var. vestita
- Hibbertia vieillardii (Brongn. & Gris) Gilg (New Caledonia)
- Hibbertia villifera Tepper ex Toelken (S.A.)
- Hibbertia villosa B.J.Conn (N.S.W.)
- Hibbertia virgata R.Br. ex DC. (S.A., N.S.W., Vic., Tas.)
- Hibbertia wandoo (J.R.Wheeler) T.Hammer & K.R.Thiele (W.A.)
- Hibbertia wagapii Gilg (New Caledonia)
- Hibbertia wheelerae K.R.Thiele (W.A.)
- Hibbertia woronorana Toelken (N.S.W.)
- Hibbertia xenandra K.R.Thiele (W.A.)
