= Hibbertia pancerea =

Scientific classification
- Kingdom: Plantae
- Clade: Tracheophytes
- Clade: Angiosperms
- Clade: Eudicots
- Order: Dilleniales
- Family: Dilleniaceae
- Genus: Hibbertia
- Species: H. pancerea

Binomial name
- Hibbertia pancerea Toelken

Species of plant

Hibbertia pancerea is a species of flowering plant in the family Dilleniaceae and is endemic to Kakadu National Park. It is a spreading shrub foliage densely covered with shield-like scales, that has elliptic leaves and yellow flowers arranged singly in leaf axils with 26 to 30 stamens arranged in bundles around two carpels.

== Description ==
Hibbertia pancerea is a spreading shrub that typically grows to a height of 1.5 m (4 ft 11 in) with dense, scaly foliage. The leaves are elliptic, 15–25 mm (0.59–0.98 in) long and 10–15 mm (0.39–0.59 in) wide on a petiole 0.6–1.2 mm (0.024–0.047 in) long. The flowers are arranged singly in leaf axils, each flower on a peduncle 6–11 mm (0.24–0.43 in) long, with lance-shaped bracts 5.5–7.1 mm (0.22–0.28 in) long. The five sepals are joined at the base, the outer sepal lobes 7.3–8 mm (0.29–0.31 in) wide and the inner lobes 5.1–5.8 mm (0.20–0.23 in) wide. The five petals are broadly egg-shaped with the narrower end towards the base, yellow, 14–16 mm (0.55–0.63 in) long and there are 26 to 30 stamens arranged in bundles around the two carpels, each carpel with two ovules. Flowering has been observed in February and March.

== Taxonomy ==
Hibbertia pancerea was first formally described in 2010 by Hellmut R. Toelken in the Journal of the Adelaide Botanic Gardens from specimens collected by David L. Jones in 1984 at Lightning Dreaming in Kakadu National Park. The specific epithet (pancerea) means "with medieval mail of armour", referring to the large scales covering the plant.

== Distribution and habitat ==
This hibbertia grows in shrubland and forest, amongst sandstone rocks and occurs on the top of the escarpment of the northern Arnhem Land plateau in Kakadu National Park.

== Conservation status ==
Hibbertia pancerea is classified as "vulnerable" under the Territory Parks and Wildlife Conservation Act 1976.

== See also ==
- List of Hibbertia species
