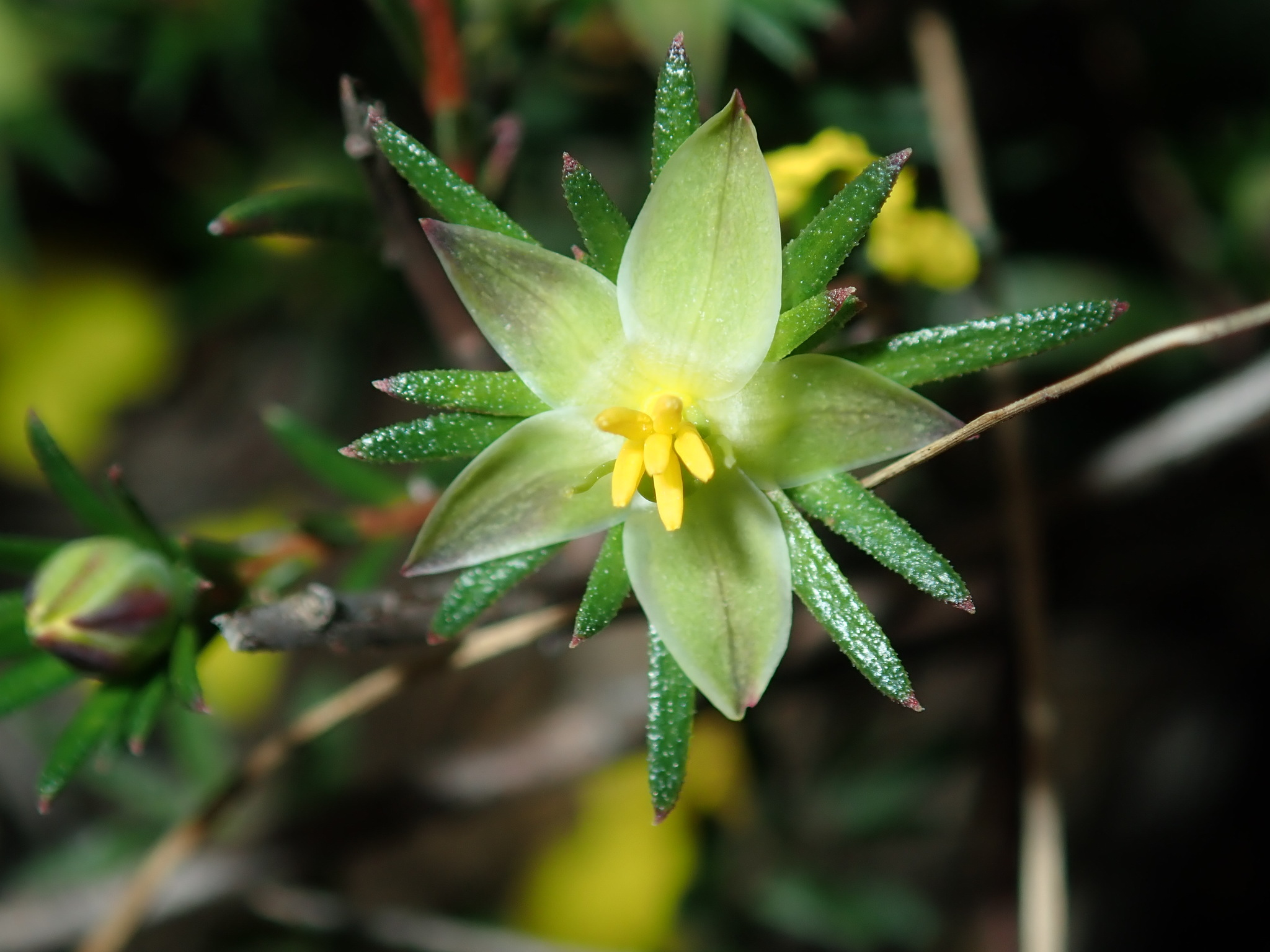

Scientific classification
- Kingdom: Plantae
- Clade: Tracheophytes
- Clade: Angiosperms
- Clade: Eudicots
- Order: Dilleniales
- Family: Dilleniaceae
- Genus: Hibbertia
- Species: H. cistifolia

Binomial name
- Hibbertia cistifolia R.Br. ex DC.

= Hibbertia cistifolia =

Species of plant

Hibbertia cistifolia is a species of flowering plant in the family Dilleniaceae and is endemic to northern Australia. It is a prostrate to low-lying sub-shrub with trailing, wiry stems, hairy foliage, oblong to elliptic leaves and yellow flowers arranged in leaf axils, with forty to fifty-eight stamens arranged around the two carpels.

== Description ==
Hibbertia cistifolia is a prostrate to low-lying sub-shrub that typically grows to a height of up to 30 cm (12 in), its stems wiry and the foliage covered with rosette-like hairs. The leaves are mostly oblong or elliptic to lance-shaped with the narrower end towards the base, 20–40 mm (0.79–1.57 in) long and 5.0–12.5 mm (0.20–0.49 in) wide on a petiole 0.2–2.4 mm (0.0079–0.0945 in) long. The flowers are arranged singly in leaf axils on a wiry peduncle 25–35 mm (0.98–1.38 in) long, with linear to lance-shaped bracts 3–4.5 mm (0.12–0.18 in) long. The five sepals are joined at the base, the two outer sepal lobes 8.5–10.4 mm (0.33–0.41 in) long and the inner lobes 6.4–7.2 mm (0.25–0.28 in) long. The five petals are broadly egg-shaped with the narrower end towards the base, yellow, 8–15 mm (0.31–0.59 in) long with a deep notch at the tip. There are forty to fifty-eight stamens arranged around the two carpels, each carpel with two ovules. Flowering occurs from December to June.

== Taxonomy ==
Hibbertia cistifolia was first formally described in 1817 by Augustin Pyramus de Candolle in his Regni Vegetabilis Systema Naturale from an unpublished description by Robert Brown.

== Distribution and habitat ==
This hibbertia grows in woodland on sandy flats and gravelly slopes in the north of the Northern Territory and on Cape York Peninsula in Queensland.

== Conservation status ==
Goodenia cistifolia is classified as of "least concern" under the Northern Territory Government Territory Parks and Wildlife Conservation Act 1976 and the Queensland Government Nature Conservation Act 1992.

== See also ==
- List of Hibbertia species
