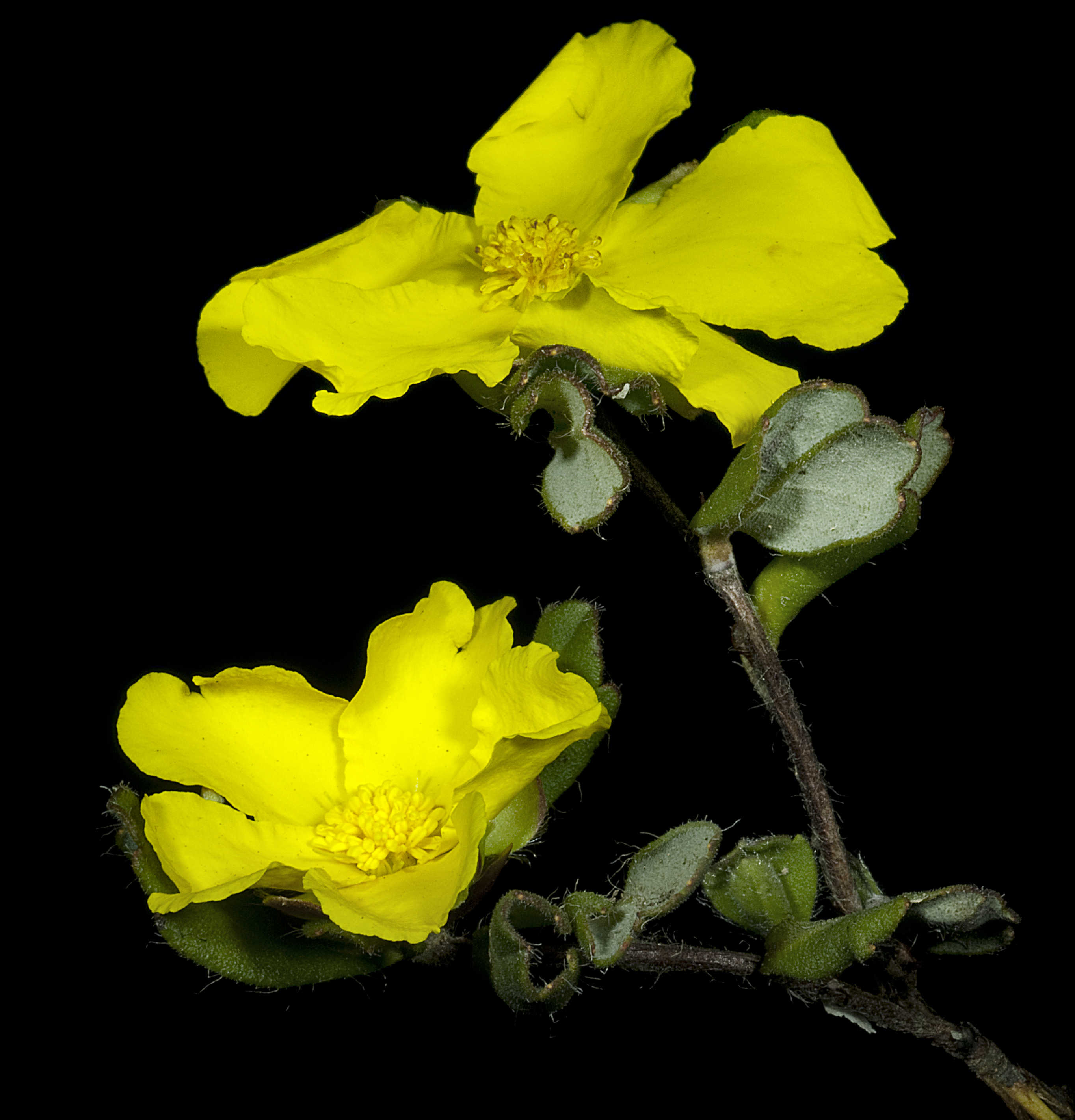

Scientific classification
- Kingdom: Plantae
- Clade: Tracheophytes
- Clade: Angiosperms
- Clade: Eudicots
- Order: Dilleniales
- Family: Dilleniaceae
- Genus: Hibbertia
- Species: H. quadricolor

Binomial name
- Hibbertia quadricolor Domin

Synonyms
- Hibbertia quadricolor Domin var. quadricolor

= Hibbertia quadricolor =

Species of flowering plant

Hibbertia quadricolor is a species of flowering plant in the family Dilleniaceae and is endemic to the south-west of Western Australia. It is a sprawling to ascending shrub that typically grows to a height of 10–50 cm (3.9–19.7 in) and produces yellow flowers between July and October.

This species was first formally described in 1923 by Karel Domin in the journal Vestnik Kralovske Ceske Spolecnosti Nauk, Trida Matematiko-Prirodevedecke from specimens collected by Arthur Dorrien-Smith. The specific epithet (quadricolor) means "four-coloured", and refers to each of the leaves, bracts, sepals and young leaves being a different colour.

Hibbertia quadricolor grows on ridges, hills and flats in the Jarrah Forest biogeographic region of south-western Western Australia.

== See also ==
- List of Hibbertia species
