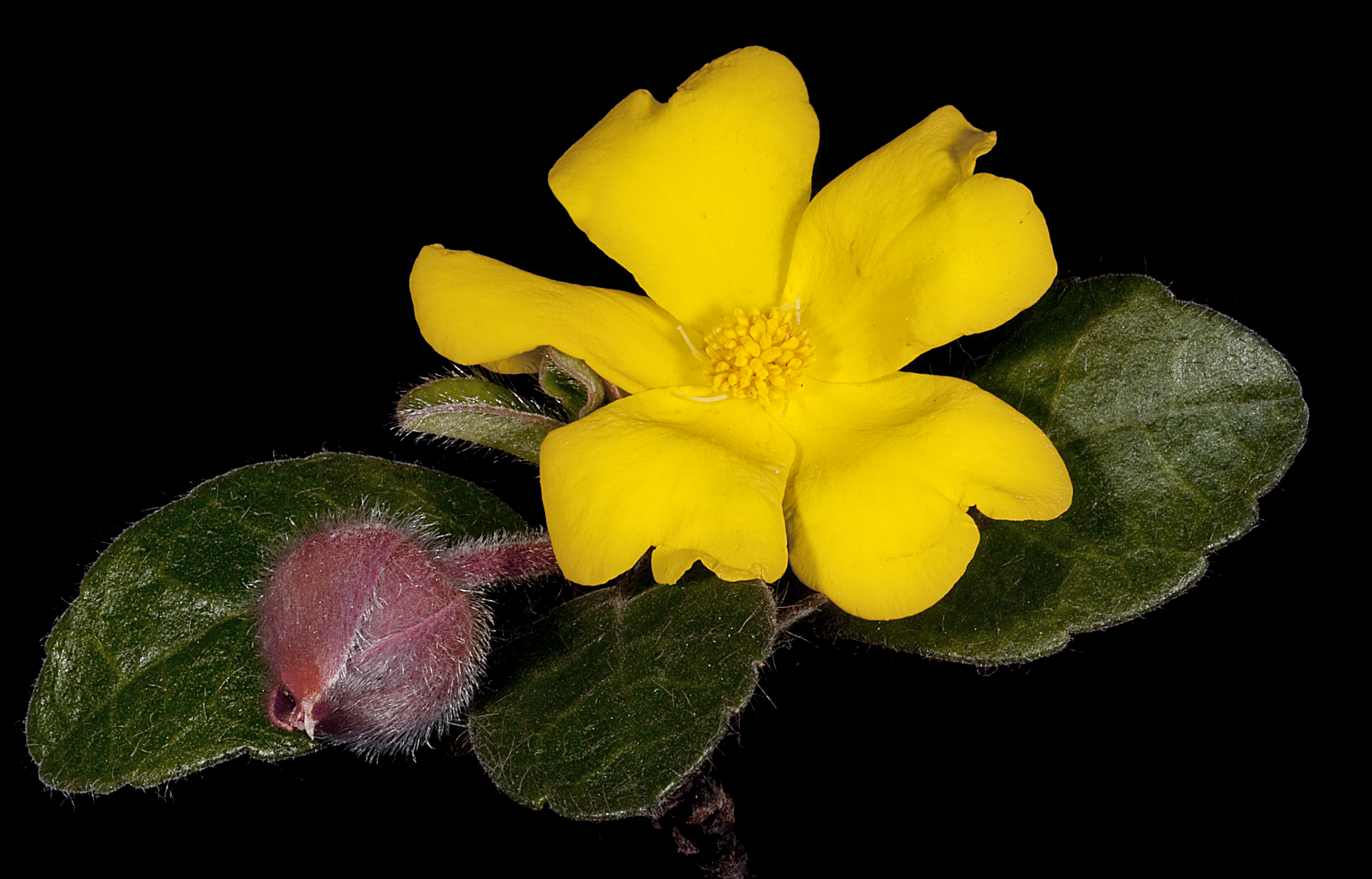

Scientific classification
- Kingdom: Plantae
- Clade: Tracheophytes
- Clade: Angiosperms
- Clade: Eudicots
- Order: Dilleniales
- Family: Dilleniaceae
- Genus: Hibbertia
- Species: H. lasiopus

Binomial name
- Hibbertia lasiopus Benth.

= Hibbertia lasiopus =

Species of flowering plant

Hibbertia lasiopus is a species of flowering plant in the family Dilleniaceae, and is endemic to the south-west of Western Australia. It is a prostrate, ascending, sometimes erect shrub that typically grows to a height of 10–50 cm (3.9–19.7 in). It was first formally described in 1863 by George Bentham in Flora Australiensis from specimens collected from the Swan River Colony by James Drummond. The specific epithet (lasiopus) means "shaggy foot", referring to the flowers' hairy peduncles.

Hibbertia lasiopus grows in soils derived from laterite in the Avon Wheatbelt, Jarrah Forest and Swan Coastal Plain biogeographic regions of south-western Western Australia. It is classified as "not threatened" by the Western Australian Government Department of Parks and Wildlife.

== See also ==
- List of Hibbertia species
