= Hibbertia pilulis =

Scientific classification
- Kingdom: Plantae
- Clade: Tracheophytes
- Clade: Angiosperms
- Clade: Eudicots
- Order: Dilleniales
- Family: Dilleniaceae
- Genus: Hibbertia
- Species: H. pilulis

Binomial name
- Hibbertia pilulis Toelken

Species of plant

Hibbertia pilulis is a species of flowering plant in the family Dilleniaceae and is endemic to Arnhem Land in the Northern Territory. It is a straggly shrub with hairy foliage, elliptic leaves and yellow flowers arranged singly in leaf axils with 34 to 46 stamens arranged in bundles around two carpels.

== Description ==
Hibbertia pilulis is a straggly shrub that typically grows to a height of up to 2 m (6 ft 7 in) with hairy foliage. The leaves are elliptic, mostly 10–30 mm (0.39–1.18 in) long and 0.8–1.8 mm (0.031–0.071 in) wide with the edges rolled under, on a petiole 0.2–0.6 mm (0.0079–0.0236 in) long. The flowers are arranged on the ends of the branches, each flower on a thread-like peduncle 14.3–43.2 mm (0.56–1.70 in) long, with linear bracts 1.3–1.6 mm (0.051–0.063 in) long at the base. The five sepals are joined at the base, the two outer sepal lobes 2.6–2.9 mm (0.10–0.11 in) wide and the inner lobes 4.6–5.1 mm (0.18–0.20 in) wide. The five petals are broadly egg-shaped with the narrower end towards the base, yellow, 9.5–11.7 mm (0.37–0.46 in) long and there are 34 to 46 stamens arranged in bundles around the two carpels, each carpel with two ovules. Flowering occurs from December to June.

== Taxonomy ==
Hibbertia pilulis was first formally described in 2010 by Hellmut R. Toelken in the Journal of the Adelaide Botanic Gardens from specimens collected by Clyde Dunlop in 1980 in Deaf Adder Gorge. The specific epithet (pilulis) means "small balls", referring to the small spherical flower buds on long peduncles.

== Distribution and habitat ==
This hibbertia grows in scrub vegetation on top of the Arnhem Land Sandstone Plateau in the northern part of the Northern Territory.

== Conservation status ==
Hibbertia pilulis is classified as of "least concern" under the Territory Parks and Wildlife Conservation Act 1976.

== See also ==
- List of Hibbertia species
