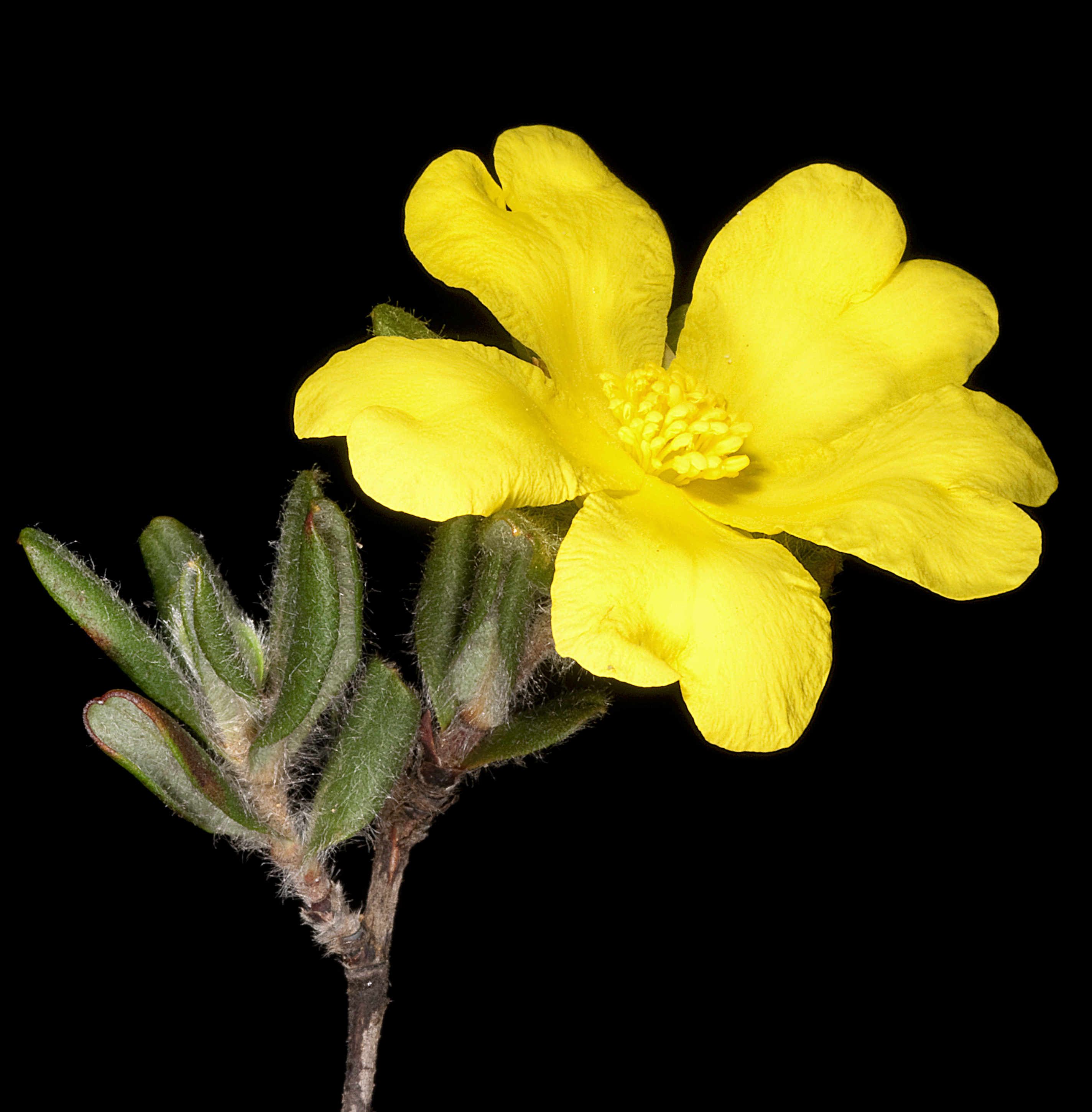

Scientific classification
- Kingdom: Plantae
- Clade: Tracheophytes
- Clade: Angiosperms
- Clade: Eudicots
- Order: Dilleniales
- Family: Dilleniaceae
- Genus: Hibbertia
- Species: H. mylnei

Binomial name
- Hibbertia mylnei Benth.

= Hibbertia mylnei =

Species of plant

Hibbertia mylnei is a shrub in the Dilleniaceae family, native to Western Australia. It was originally described by George Bentham in 1863. The plant's yellow flowers are seen in July to September.

== See also ==
- List of Hibbertia species
