= Hibbertia hirsuta =

Scientific classification
- Kingdom: Plantae
- Clade: Tracheophytes
- Clade: Angiosperms
- Clade: Eudicots
- Order: Dilleniales
- Family: Dilleniaceae
- Genus: Hibbertia
- Species: H. hirsuta

Binomial name
- Hibbertia hirsuta (Hook.) Benth.

Species of flowering plant

Hibbertia hirsuta is a species of flowering plant in the family Dilleniaceae, and is endemic to southern Australia. It is a small, slender, prostrate shrub with sparsely hairy foliage, narrow elliptic leaves and small yellow flowers with a single petal, usually only a single stamen and two carpels.

== Description ==
Hibbertia hirsuta is a slender, prostrate shrub that typically grows to a height of up to 15 cm (5.9 in) and has thin, wiry branches. The leaves are narrow elliptic, 3.5–5 mm (0.14–0.20 in) long and 0.9–1.3 mm (0.035–0.051 in) wide on a petiole up to 0.4 mm (0.016 in) long. The flowers are arranged singly in leaf axils and on the ends of short side shoots, and are sessile. The three outer sepals are lance-shaped, 4.0–4.4 mm (0.16–0.17 in) long and the two inner sepals are elliptic and slightly shorter. There is only a single linear, yellow petal 3.2–3.7 mm (0.13–0.15 in) long shielding a single stamen, or rarely two. There are two carpels, each with two ovules.

== Taxonomy ==
This species was formally described in 1836 by William Jackson Hooker and was given the name Pleurandra hirsuta in the Companion to the Botanical Magazine from specimens collected by James Backhouse "near Hobart Town". In 1963, George Bentham changed the name to Hibbertia hirsuta in Flora Australiensis.

== Distribution and habitat ==
Hibbertia hirsuta grows in grassland, woodland and heath, in northern Tasmania and south-eastern South Australia.

== See also ==
- List of Hibbertia species
