= Hibbertia tomentosa =

Scientific classification
- Kingdom: Plantae
- Clade: Tracheophytes
- Clade: Angiosperms
- Clade: Eudicots
- Order: Dilleniales
- Family: Dilleniaceae
- Genus: Hibbertia
- Species: H. tomentosa

Binomial name
- Hibbertia tomentosa Toelken

Species of flowering plant

Hibbertia tomentosa is a species of flowering plant in the family Dilleniaceae and is endemic to the Northern Territory. It is a small, spreading to low-lying shrub with its foliage covered with rosette-like hairs, and has linear leaves and yellow flowers arranged singly on the ends of short side branches, with fourteen to twenty stamens arranged in bundles around two densely scaly carpels.

== Description ==
Hibbertia tomentosa is a spreading to low-lying shrublet that typically grows to a height of up to 50 cm (20 in) and has foliage covered with rosette-like hairs. The leaves are linear, mostly 4–12 mm (0.16–0.47 in) long, 1–3 mm (0.039–0.118 in) wide and sessile or on a petiole up to 0.3 mm (0.012 in) long. The flowers are arranged singly on the ends of short side branches on a thread-like peduncle 3.6–10.7 mm (0.14–0.42 in) long, with linear bracts 2.5–4 mm (0.098–0.157 in) long at the base. The five sepals are joined at the base, the three outer sepal lobes 4.0–4.5 mm (0.16–0.18 in) long and 1.7–1.9 mm (0.067–0.075 in) wide, and the inner lobes shorter but broader. The five petals are narrow egg-shaped with the narrower end towards the base, yellow, 2.8–5.7 mm (0.11–0.22 in) long with a divided tip. There are fourteen to twenty stamens arranged in bundles around two densely scaly carpels, each carpel with two ovules. Flowering occurs from January to June.

== Taxonomy ==
Hibbertia tomentosa was first formally described in 1817 by Augustin Pyramus de Candolle from an unpublished description by Robert Brown. De Candolle's description was published in his Regni Vegetabilis Systema Naturale. The specific epithet (tomentosa) means "tomentose".

== Distribution ==
This hibbertia often grows on sandstone escarpments and is found on the Arnhem Land Plateau in the Northern Territory.

== Conservation status ==
Hibbertia tomentosa is classified as "least concern" under the Northern Territory Government Northern Territory Government Territory Parks and Wildlife Conservation Act 1976.

== See also ==
- List of Hibbertia species
