= Hibbertia ligulata =

Scientific classification
- Kingdom: Plantae
- Clade: Tracheophytes
- Clade: Angiosperms
- Clade: Eudicots
- Order: Dilleniales
- Family: Dilleniaceae
- Genus: Hibbertia
- Species: H. ligulata

Binomial name
- Hibbertia ligulata Toelken

Species of plant

Hibbertia ligulata is a species of flowering plant in the family Dilleniaceae and is endemic to the Northern Territory. It is a shrublet with hairy, wiry branches, linear leaves, and single yellow flowers arranged in leaf axils with twelve stamens arranged in bundles around the two carpels.

== Description ==
Hibbertia ligulata is a shrublet with erect, hairy, wiry branches and that typically grows to a height of up to 20 cm (7.9 in). The leaves are linear, 10–18 mm (0.39–0.71 in) long and 0.5–0.7 mm (0.020–0.028 in) wide and sessile or on a petiole up to 0.3 mm (0.012 in) long. The flowers are arranged singly near the ends of shoots on a thread-like peduncle 5.8–6.7 mm (0.23–0.26 in) long, with linear bracts 3.8–4.6 mm (0.15–0.18 in) long. The five sepals are joined at the base, the two outer sepal lobes linear to lance-shaped, about 4.5 mm (0.18 in) long and the inner lobes oblong to lance-shaped and 3.5–3.8 mm (0.14–0.15 in) long. The five petals are egg-shaped with the narrower end towards the base, yellow, 4.3–4.7 mm (0.17–0.19 in) long and there are twelve stamens arranged in five groups around the two carpels, each carpel with two ovules.

== Taxonomy ==
Hibbertia ligulata was first formally described in 2010 by Hellmut R. Toelken in the Journal of the Adelaide Botanic Gardens from specimens collected on Munmarlary Station in 1973. The specific epithet (ligulata) means "strap-shaped", referring to the shape of the bracts.

== Distribution and habitat ==
This hibbertia grows in forest at the base of the Arnhem Land Plateau.

== Conservation status ==
Hibbertia incurvata is classified as "data deficient" under the Territory Parks and Wildlife Conservation Act 1976.

== See also ==
- List of Hibbertia species
