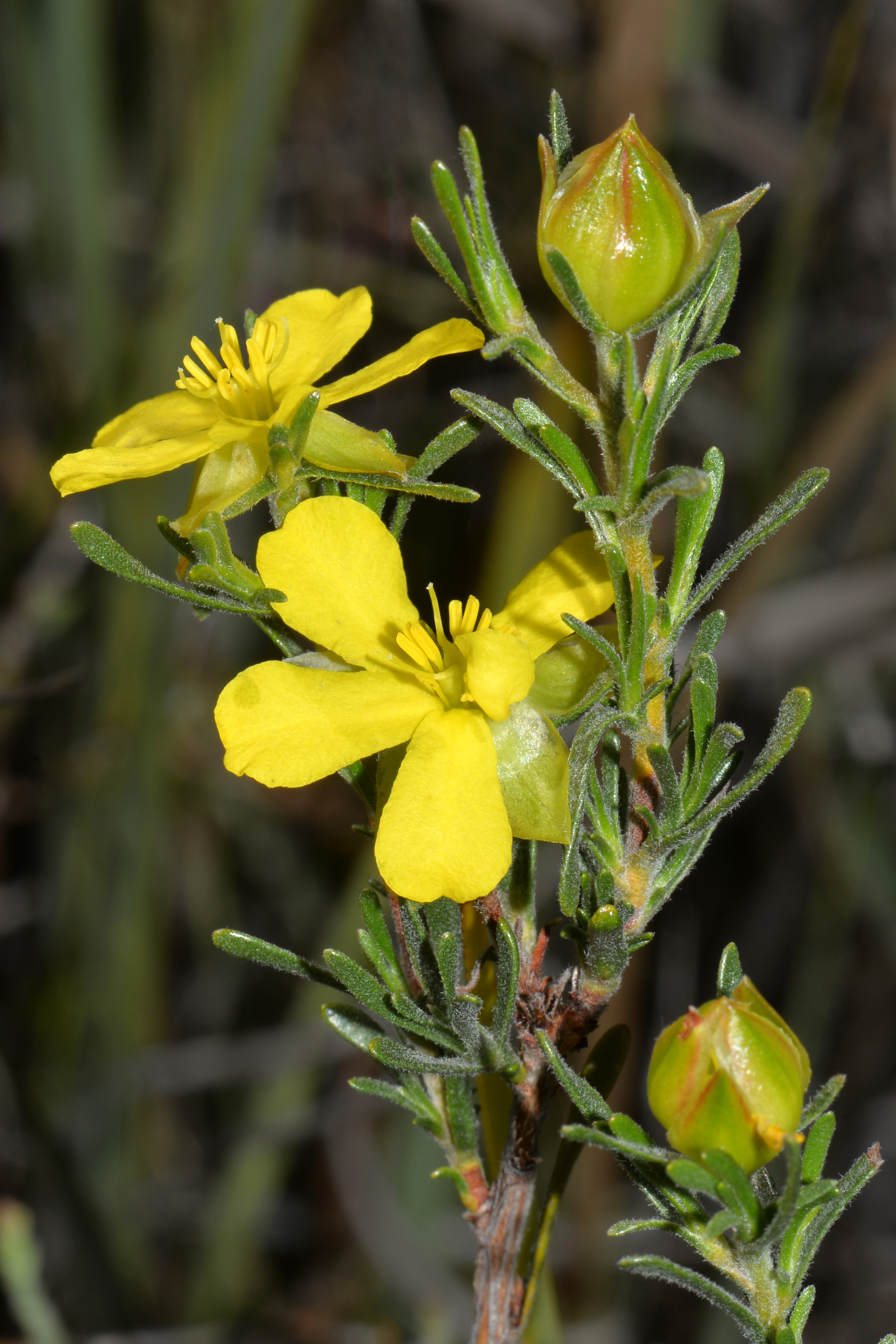

Scientific classification
- Kingdom: Plantae
- Clade: Tracheophytes
- Clade: Angiosperms
- Clade: Eudicots
- Order: Dilleniales
- Family: Dilleniaceae
- Genus: Hibbertia
- Species: H. inclusa

Binomial name
- Hibbertia inclusa Benth.

= Hibbertia inclusa =

Species of flowering plant

Hibbertia inclusa is a species of flowering plant in the family Dilleniaceae and is endemic to the south-west of Western Australia. It is an erect, spreading shrub that typically grows to a height of 20–90 cm (7.9–35.4 in). It was first formally described in 1863 by George Bentham in Flora Australiensis from specimens collected from the Swan River Colony by James Drummond. The specific epithet (inclusa) means "enclosed", referring to the flowers being enclosed in floral bracts.

Hibbertia inclusa grows in claypans, floodplains, ridges and dunes in the Avon Wheatbelt, Coolgardie, Esperance Plains, Jarrah Forest, Mallee, Swan Coastal Plain and Warren biogeographic regions of south-western Western Australia. It is classified as "not threatened" by the Western Australian Government Department of Parks and Wildlife.

== See also ==
- List of Hibbertia species
