= Hibbertia brennanii =

Scientific classification
- Kingdom: Plantae
- Clade: Tracheophytes
- Clade: Angiosperms
- Clade: Eudicots
- Order: Dilleniales
- Family: Dilleniaceae
- Genus: Hibbertia
- Species: H. brennanii

Binomial name
- Hibbertia brennanii Toelken

Species of flowering plant

Hibbertia brennanii is a species of flowering plant in the family Dilleniaceae and is endemic to the Arnhem Land escarpment. It is a low, spreading sub-shrub with hairy foliage, elliptic to lance-shaped leaves and pale yellow flowers arranged singly in leaf axils, with ten to twelve stamens arranged in groups around the two carpels.

== Description ==
Hibbertia brennanii is a low, spreading sub-shrub that typically grows to a height of up to 30 cm (12 in), its foliage more or less densely hairy, the branches wiry at first, later stiffly woody. The leaves are elliptic to lance-shaped with the narrower end towards the base, mostly 3–9 mm (0.12–0.35 in) long and 1.5–4.5 mm (0.059–0.177 in) wide on a petiole up to 0.6 mm (0.024 in) long. The flowers are arranged singly in leaf axils on a stiff, thread-like peduncle 3.4–6.6 mm (0.13–0.26 in) long, with linear bracts 1.6–2 mm (0.063–0.079 in) long. The five sepals are joined at the base, the two outer sepal lobes 2.8–3.5 mm (0.11–0.14 in) long and the inner lobes 3.2–3.7 mm (0.13–0.15 in) long. The five petals are egg-shaped to wedge-shaped with the narrower end towards the base, pale yellow, 3.6–4.2 mm (0.14–0.17 in) long with two lobes. There are ten to twelve stamens arranged in groups around the two carpels, each carpel with two ovules. Flowering occurs from March to May.

== Taxonomy ==
Hibbertia brennanii was first formally described in 2010 by Hellmut R. Toelken in the Journal of the Adelaide Botanic Gardens from specimens collected by Kym G. Brennan in Kakadu National Park in 1999. The specific epithet (brennanii) honours the collector of the type specimens.

== Distribution and habitat ==
This hibbertia grows in rock crevices in heath on top of the Arnhem Land escarpment in the Northern Territory.

== Conservation status ==
Goodenia brennanii is classified as "vulnerable" under the Northern Territory Government Territory Parks and Wildlife Conservation Act 1976 and is threatened by human activities and inappropriate fire regimes.

== See also ==
- List of Hibbertia species
