= Hibbertia circularis =

Scientific classification
- Kingdom: Plantae
- Clade: Tracheophytes
- Clade: Angiosperms
- Clade: Eudicots
- Order: Dilleniales
- Family: Dilleniaceae
- Genus: Hibbertia
- Species: H. circularis

Binomial name
- Hibbertia circularis Toelken

Species of plant

Hibbertia circularis is a species of flowering plant in the family Dilleniaceae and is endemic to the northern part of the Northern Territory. It is a perennial herb with prostrate, trailing branches, elliptic to more or less round leaves, and yellow flowers arranged in leaf axils, with thirty stamens arranged in groups around the two carpels.

== Description ==
Hibbertia circularis is a perennial herb with prostrate, trailing branches up to 40 cm (16 in) long and sparsely hairy. The leaves are elliptic to more or less round, 15–25 mm (0.59–0.98 in) long and 15–21 mm (0.59–0.83 in) wide on a petiole 0.8–1.5 mm (0.031–0.059 in) long. The flowers are arranged singly or in pairs, in leaf axils on a thread-like peduncle 10–15 mm (0.39–0.59 in) long, with egg-shaped bracts 1.1–1.6 mm (0.043–0.063 in) long. The five sepals are joined at the base, the two outer sepal lobes 2.2–2.5 mm (0.087–0.098 in) long and the inner lobes 3–3.3 mm (0.12–0.13 in) long. The five petals are egg-shaped with the narrower end towards the base, yellow, 3.8–5.6 mm (0.15–0.22 in) long with a deep notch at the tip. There are thirty stamens and three or four staminodes arranged in groups around the two carpels, each carpel with two ovules. Flowering has been observed in February and March.

== Taxonomy ==
Hibbertia circularis was first formally described in 2010 by Hellmut R. Toelken in the Journal of the Adelaide Botanic Gardens from specimens collected by Ian Cowie near Mount Howship in 2000. The specific epithet (circularis) refers to the almost round leaves.

== Distribution and habitat ==
This hibbertia grows in sand between rocks in woodland in western Arnhem Land escarpment in the Northern Territory.

== Conservation status ==
Goodenia circularis is only known from three collections and is classified as "data deficient" under the Northern Territory Government Territory Parks and Wildlife Conservation Act 1976.

== See also ==
- List of Hibbertia species
