= Hibbertia scabra =

Scientific classification
- Kingdom: Plantae
- Clade: Tracheophytes
- Clade: Angiosperms
- Clade: Eudicots
- Order: Dilleniales
- Family: Dilleniaceae
- Genus: Hibbertia
- Species: H. scabra

Binomial name
- Hibbertia scabra R.Br. ex Benth.

Species of flowering plant

Hibbertia scabra is a species of flowering plant in the family Dilleniaceae and is endemic to the north of the Northern Territory. It is a small shrub with hairy foliage, linear to narrow elliptical leaves and yellow flowers arranged singly near the ends of branches with about fifty stamens arranged around two densely scaly carpels.

== Description ==
Hibbertia scabra is a shrub that typically grows to a height of 20 m (66 ft) and has its foliage covered with scales and rosette-like hairs. The leaves are linear to narrow elliptic, mostly 9.5–18 mm (0.37–0.71 in) long and 1–2 mm (0.039–0.079 in) wide on a petiole up to 1.2 mm (0.047 in) long. The flowers are arranged singly near the ends of branches, each flower on a wiry peduncle 12.8–22.5 mm (0.50–0.89 in) long, with linear bracts 2.4–2.6 mm (0.094–0.102 in) long at the base. The five sepals are joined at the base, the two outer sepal lobes 5.4–8.5 mm (0.21–0.33 in) long and 2.2–3.3 mm (0.087–0.130 in) wide, and the inner lobes slightly shorter but broader. The five petals are egg-shaped with the narrower end towards the base, yellow, 5.5–11.6 mm (0.22–0.46 in) long and there are about fifty stamens arranged around two densely scaly carpels, each carpel with two ovules. Flowering occurs from March to April.

== Taxonomy ==
Hibbertia scabra was first formally described in 1863 by George Bentham in Flora Australiensis from specimens collected by Robert Brown (botanist, born 1773) on the north coast of Northern Australia. The specific epithet (scabra) means "rough".

== Distribution and habitat ==
This hibbertia grows in woodland in a few locations in northern Arnhem Land in the Northern Territory.

== Conservation status ==
Hibbertia scabra is classified as "near threatened" under the Territory Parks and Wildlife Conservation Act 1976.

== See also ==
- List of Hibbertia species
