= Hibbertia velutina =

Scientific classification
- Kingdom: Plantae
- Clade: Tracheophytes
- Clade: Angiosperms
- Clade: Eudicots
- Order: Dilleniales
- Family: Dilleniaceae
- Genus: Hibbertia
- Species: H. velutina

Binomial name
- Hibbertia velutina R.Br. ex Benth.

Species of flowering plant

Hibbertia velutina is a species of flowering plant in the family Dilleniaceae and is endemic to Queensland. It is a shrub with foliage covered with rosette-like hairs, elliptic leaves, and yellow flowers with thirty to thirty-six stamens arranged in bundles around two densely scaly carpels.

== Description ==
Hibbertia velutina is a shrub that typically grows to a height of less than 1 m (3 ft 3 in) and has foliage covered with rosette-like hairs. The leaves are elliptic, mostly 35–60 mm (1.4–2.4 in) long and 10–20 mm (0.39–0.79 in) wide on a petiole 3–4 mm (0.12–0.16 in) long. The flowers are arranged singly in leaf axils on an erect peduncle 10–18 mm (0.39–0.71 in) long, with linear bracts 3.7–6.2 mm (0.15–0.24 in) long at the base. The five sepals are joined at the base, the three outer sepal lobes 9.2–14.6 mm (0.36–0.57 in) long and 3.8–4.3 mm (0.15–0.17 in) wide, and the inner lobes shorter but broader. The five petals are narrow egg-shaped with the narrower end towards the base, yellow, 6.8–10.4 mm (0.27–0.41 in) long with two lobes on the end. There are thirty to thirty-six stamens arranged in bundles around two densely scaly carpels, each carpel with three or four ovules. Flowering occurs from May to December.

== Taxonomy ==
Hibbertia velutina was first formally described in 1863 by George Bentham from an unpublished description by Robert Brown. Bentham's description was published in Flora Australiensis. The specific epithet (tomentosa) means "velvety".

== Distribution and habitat ==
This hibbertia grows in near-coastal forest or woodland and is apparently restricted to the Byfield National Park.

== Conservation status ==
Hibbertia velutina is classified as "least concern" under the Queensland Government Nature Conservation Act 1992.

== See also ==
- List of Hibbertia species
