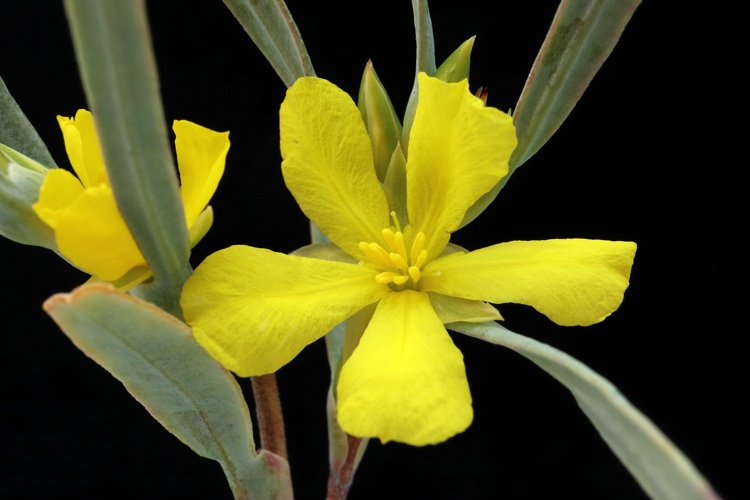
- In the Australian National Botanic Gardens

Scientific classification
- Kingdom: Plantae
- Clade: Tracheophytes
- Clade: Angiosperms
- Clade: Eudicots
- Order: Dilleniales
- Family: Dilleniaceae
- Genus: Hibbertia
- Species: H. vaginata

Binomial name
- Hibbertia vaginata (Benth.) F.Muell.

= Hibbertia vaginata =

Species of flowering plant

Hibbertia vaginata is a species of flowering plant in the family Dilleniaceae and is endemic to the south-west of Western Australia. It is an erect, spreading shrub that typically grows to a height of 20–75 cm (7.9–29.5 in).

It was first formally described in 1863 by George Bentham who gave it the name Candollea vaginata in Flora Australiensis from specimens collected by James Drummond. In 1880, Ferdinand von Mueller changed the name to Hibbertia vaginata in Fragmenta Phytographiae Australiae. The specific epithet (vaginata) means "sheathed", referring to the leaf base.

This hibbertia grows in sandy or gravelly soils in the Jarrah Forest, Swan Coastal Plain and Warren biogeographical regions of south-western Western Australia.

Hibbertia vaginata is classified as "not threatened" by the Western Australian Government Department of Parks and Wildlife.

== See also ==
- List of Hibbertia species
