= Hibbertia sulcata =

Scientific classification
- Kingdom: Plantae
- Clade: Tracheophytes
- Clade: Angiosperms
- Clade: Eudicots
- Order: Dilleniales
- Family: Dilleniaceae
- Genus: Hibbertia
- Species: H. sulcata

Binomial name
- Hibbertia sulcata Toelken

Species of flowering plant

Hibbertia sulcata is a species of flowering plant in the family Dilleniaceae and is only known from a single specimen collected in Arnhem Land in the Northern Territory. It is a small, sprawling shrub with wiry branches, linear leaves and yellow flowers arranged singly or in pairs in leaf axils with 22 to 24 stamens arranged in groups around two densely scaly carpels.

== Description ==
Hibbertia sulcata is a shrub that typically grows to a height of up to 20 cm (7.9 in) and has wiry branches and scaly foliage. The leaves are linear, mostly 20–35 mm (0.79–1.38 in) long, 1.2–1.6 mm (0.047–0.063 in) wide and more or less sessile. The flowers are arranged singly or in pairs in leaf axils on a thread-like peduncle 3.3–5.7 mm (0.13–0.22 in) long, with linear bracts about 1 mm (0.039 in) long at the base. The five sepals are joined at the base, the two outer sepal lobes 2–2.5 mm (0.079–0.098 in) long and 2 mm (0.079 in) wide, and the inner lobes longer and broader. The five petals are wedge-shaped with two lobes, yellow, 4.2–5.6 mm (0.17–0.22 in) long and there are 22 to 24 stamens arranged around the two densely scaly carpels, each carpel with two ovules.

== Taxonomy ==
Hibbertia sulcata was first formally described in 2010 by Hellmut R. Toelken in the Journal of the Adelaide Botanic Gardens from a specimen collected in north-eastern Arnhem Land in 2002. The specific epithet (sulcata) means "furrowed", referring to the edges of the leaves.

== Distribution ==
This hibbertia is only known from a single specimen collected from the Gudjekbinj outstation.

== Conservation status ==
Hibbertia sulcata is classified as "data deficient" under the Northern Territory Government Northern Territory Government Territory Parks and Wildlife Conservation Act 1976.

== See also ==
- List of Hibbertia species
