= Hibbertia extrorsa =

Scientific classification
- Kingdom: Plantae
- Clade: Tracheophytes
- Clade: Angiosperms
- Clade: Eudicots
- Order: Dilleniales
- Family: Dilleniaceae
- Genus: Hibbertia
- Species: H. extrorsa

Binomial name
- Hibbertia extrorsa Toelken

Species of plant

Hibbertia extrorsa is a species of flowering plant in the family Dilleniaceae and is endemic to a restricted part of the Northern Territory. It is a small, spreading shrub with hairy foliage, linear to elliptic leaves, and yellow flowers arranged in leaf axils with about thirty stamens arranged in groups around the two carpels.

== Description ==
Hibbertia extrorsa is a spreading shrublet that typically grows to a height of 40 cm (16 in) with its foliage covered with rosette-like hairs. The leaves are linear to elliptic, 9–18 mm (0.35–0.71 in) long and 1–2.5 mm (0.039–0.098 in) wide on an indistinct petiole up to 1.4 mm (0.055 in) long. The flowers are arranged singly or in pairs in leaf axils on a thin peduncle 1.3–3.4 mm (0.051–0.134 in) long, with a lance-shaped bract 1.9–2.3 mm (0.075–0.091 in) long. The five sepals are joined at the base, the two outer sepal lobes 3.1–3.5 mm (0.12–0.14 in) long and the inner lobes slightly shorter. The five petals are wedge-shaped, yellow, 2.8–3.4 mm (0.11–0.13 in) long and there are about thirty stamens arranged in groups around the two, sometimes three carpels, each carpel with two or three ovules. Flowering has been observed in March and April.

== Taxonomy ==
Hibbertia extrorsa was first formally described in 2010 by Hellmut R. Toelken in the Journal of the Adelaide Botanic Gardens from specimens collected in 1990. The specific epithet (extrorsa) means "turned away from the centre" and refers to the curved sepal lobes.

== Distribution and habitat ==
This hibbertia grows in sand on sandstone in woodland in a small area of Arnhem Land in the Northern Territory.

== Conservation status ==
Goodenia extrorsa is classified as "near threatened" under the Territory Parks and Wildlife Conservation Act 1976.

== See also ==
- List of Hibbertia species
