= Hibbertia graniticola =

Conservation status
- Priority Three — Poorly Known Taxa (DEC)

Scientific classification
- Kingdom: Plantae
- Clade: Tracheophytes
- Clade: Angiosperms
- Clade: Eudicots
- Order: Dilleniales
- Family: Dilleniaceae
- Genus: Hibbertia
- Species: H. graniticola

Binomial name
- Hibbertia graniticola J.R.Wheeler

Species of flowering plant

Hibbertia graniticola is a species of flowering plant in the family Dilleniaceae and is endemic to the south-west of Western Australia. It is a shrub with thick, linear leaves and yellow flowers borne singly on the ends of branchlets, with seventeen to thirty stamens arranged around the two or three carpels.

== Description ==
Hibbertia graniticola is a shrub that typically grows to a height of 1.5 m (4 ft 11 in) with the foliage densely covered with minute hairs. The leaves are thick, linear, 10–20 mm (0.39–0.79 in) long and 1.2–1.5 mm (0.047–0.059 in) wide on a petiole 1–1.5 mm (0.039–0.059 in) long with the edges rolled down and fused to the midrib. The flowers are 20–35 mm (0.79–1.38 in) wide, borne singly on the ends of branchlets and sessile, with inconspicuous leaf-like bracts 9–12 mm (0.35–0.47 in) long. The five sepals are joined at the base, elliptic, the outer sepals 4–8 mm (0.16–0.31 in) long and the inner sepals 7–11 mm (0.28–0.43 in) wide. The five petals are yellow, egg-shaped with the narrower end towards the base, 14–20 mm (0.55–0.79 in) long with a notch at the tip. There are seventeen to thirty stamens arranged around the two or three carpels, each carpel containing ten ovules. Flowering occurs from August to September.

== Taxonomy ==
Hibbertia graniticola was first formally described in 1994 by Judy Wheeler in the journal Nuytsia from specimens she collected near Warralakin in 1988. The specific epithet (graniticola) refers to the usual habit of this species, apparently restricted to granite outcrops.

== Distribution and habitat ==
This hibbertia grows in sandy pockets on granite outcrops near Warralakin in the Avon Wheatbelt biogeographic region of south-western Western Australia.

== Conservation status ==
Hibbertia graniticola is classified as "Priority Three" by the Government of Western Australia Department of Parks and Wildlife meaning that it is poorly known and known from only a few locations but is not under imminent threat.

== See also ==
- List of Hibbertia species
