= Hibbertia turleyana =

Conservation status
- Priority Two — Poorly Known Taxa (DEC)

Scientific classification
- Kingdom: Plantae
- Clade: Tracheophytes
- Clade: Angiosperms
- Clade: Eudicots
- Order: Dilleniales
- Family: Dilleniaceae
- Genus: Hibbertia
- Species: H. turleyana

Binomial name
- Hibbertia turleyana J.R.Wheeler

Species of flowering plant

Hibbertia turleyana is a species of flowering plant in the family Dilleniaceae and is endemic to a small area in the south of Western Australia. It is a low-lying shrub with more or less glabrous, linear leaves and bright yellow flowers with eight or nine stamens in a single group on one side of two densely hairy carpels.

== Description ==
Hibbertia turleyana is a low-lying, multi-stemmed shrub that typically grows to a height of up to 30 cm (12 in) and has more or less glabrous foliage. The leaves are linear, mostly 10–25 mm (0.39–0.98 in) long and 0.8–1.3 mm (0.031–0.051 in) wide on a petiole 0.5–1.0 mm (0.020–0.039 in) long. The flowers are usually arranged singly, sometimes in pairs, in leaf axils on a reddish peduncle 6–15 mm (0.24–0.59 in) long with hairy, narrow egg-shaped bracts 1–2 mm (0.039–0.079 in) long. The five sepals are joined at the base, mostly 5–6 mm (0.20–0.24 in) long, the outer sepals 2–3 mm (0.079–0.118 in) wide and the inner sepals 3–4 mm (0.12–0.16 in) wide. The five petals are bright yellow, egg-shaped with the narrower end towards the base and mostly 5–8 mm (0.20–0.31 in) long with a notch at the tip. There are eight, sometimes nine stamens fused at the base on one side of the two densely hairy carpels that each contain two ovules.

== Taxonomy ==
Hibbertia turleyana was first formally described in 2004 Judith R. Wheeler in the journal Nuytsia from specimens she collected in Helms Arboretum 2000. The specific epithet (turleyana) honours Coral Turley of Esperance, "in appreciation of her assistance".

== Distribution and habitat ==
This hibbertia grows in heath and mallee shrubland and is apparently restricted to a small area just north of Esperance in the Esperance Plains and Mallee biogeographic regions of Western Australia.

== Conservation status ==
Hibbertia turleyana is listed as "Priority Two" by the Western Australian Government Department of Biodiversity, Conservation and Attractions, meaning that it is poorly known and from only one or a few locations.

== See also ==
- List of Hibbertia species
