= Hibbertia nutans =

Nodding guinea flower

Scientific classification
- Kingdom: Plantae
- Clade: Tracheophytes
- Clade: Angiosperms
- Clade: Eudicots
- Order: Dilleniales
- Family: Dilleniaceae
- Genus: Hibbertia
- Species: H. nutans

Binomial name
- Hibbertia nutans Benth.

Species of flowering plant

Hibbertia nutans, commonly known as nodding guinea flower, is a species of flowering plant in the family Dilleniaceae and is endemic to the south-west of Western Australia. It is an erect shrub that typically grows to a height of 0.2–1.0 m (7.9 in – 3 ft 3.4 in) and flowers between August and October producing yellow flowers. It was first formally described in 1863 by George Bentham in Flora Australiensis from specimens collected in 1843 by James Drummond in the Swan River Colony. The specific epithet (nutans) means "nodding".

Hibbertia nutans grows on rocky granite slopes and on granite rocks in the Avon Wheatbelt and Mallee biogeographic regions of south-western Western Australia.

== See also ==
- List of Hibbertia species
