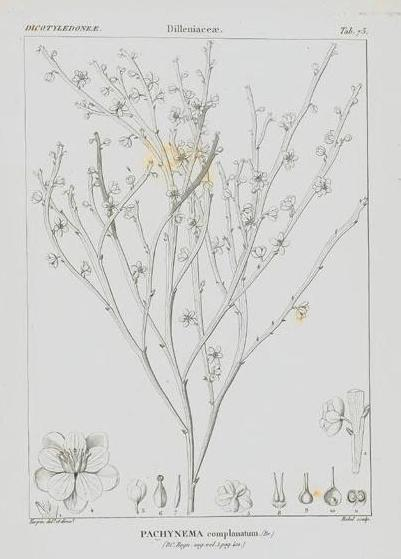
- Illustration of Pachynema complanatum from de Candolle's Icones selectae plantarum quas in systemate universali

Scientific classification
- Kingdom: Plantae
- Clade: Tracheophytes
- Clade: Angiosperms
- Clade: Eudicots
- Order: Dilleniales
- Family: Dilleniaceae
- Genus: Hibbertia
- Species: H. complanata

Binomial name
- Hibbertia complanata (R.Br. ex DC.) J.W.Horn

Synonyms
- Pachynema complanatum R.Br. ex DC.

= Hibbertia complanata =

Species of plant

Hibbertia complanata is a species of flowering plant in the family Dilleniaceae and is endemic to the Northern Territory. It is a sub-shrub with two forms of erect, flattened stems, elliptic leaves and pinkish or creamy-white flowers arranged in leaf axils, with seven or eight stamens.

== Description ==
Hibbertia complanata is an erect, rhizome-forming sub-shrub that typically grows to a height of up to 1.5 m (4 ft 11 in) and has two forms of stems. Shorter stems have many flattened branchlets mostly 3–10 mm (0.12–0.39 in) wide, longer stems have fewer, much narrower branchlets. The leaves are elliptic with teeth on the sides near the base, 15–25 mm (0.59–0.98 in) long on a petiole 2–5 mm (0.079–0.197 in) long. The flowers are arranged singly in leaf axils on a peduncle 1–3 mm (0.039–0.118 in) long. The five sepals are egg-shaped to more or less round, 3.5–5.5 mm (0.14–0.22 in) long, the five petals pinkish or creamy-white, broadly elliptic to round, 3.5–5 mm (0.14–0.20 in) long with wavy edges. There are seven or eight stamens and two staminodes arranged around the two carpels. Flowering occurs from March to September.

== Taxonomy ==
This species was first formally described in 1817 by Augustin Pyramus de Candolle in his Regni Vegetabilis Systema Naturale from an unpublished description by Robert Brown and was given the name Pachynema complanatum. In 2009, James W. Horn changed the name to Hibbertia complanata in the International Journal of Plant Sciences on the basis of phylogenetic studies.

== Distribution and habitat ==
Hibbertia complanata is relatively common in savanna in well-drained soil in the northern part of the Northern Territory.

== Conservation status ==
Hibbertia complanata is classified as of "least concern" under the Northern Territory Government Territory Parks and Wildlife Conservation Act 1976.

== See also ==
- List of Hibbertia species
