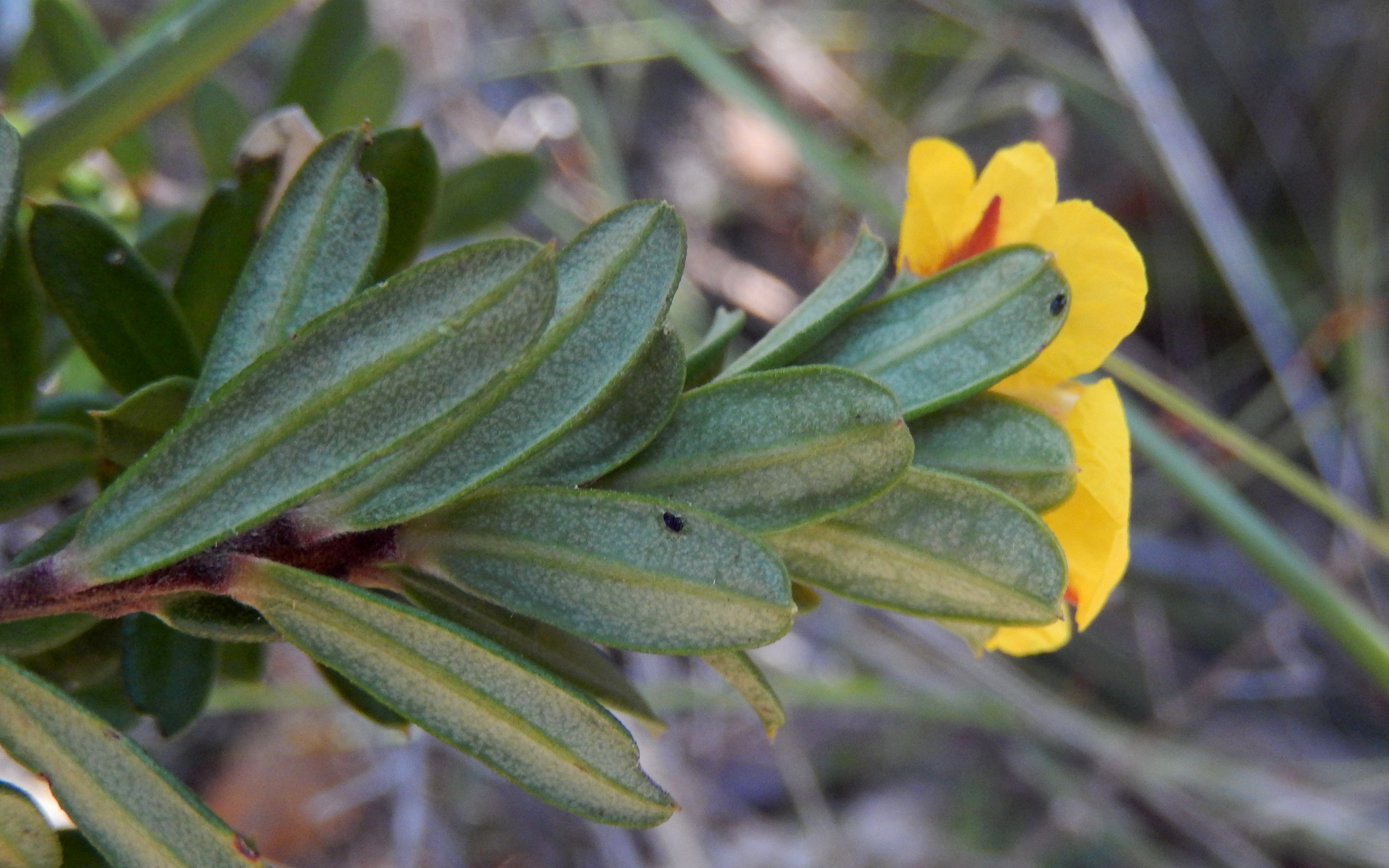
- In Ku-ring-gai Chase National Park

Scientific classification
- Kingdom: Plantae
- Clade: Tracheophytes
- Clade: Angiosperms
- Clade: Eudicots
- Order: Dilleniales
- Family: Dilleniaceae
- Genus: Hibbertia
- Species: H. bracteata

Binomial name
- Hibbertia bracteata (R.Br. ex DC.) Benth.

= Hibbertia bracteata =

Species of flowering plant

Hibbertia bracteata is a species of flowering plant, in the family Dilleniaceae and is endemic to eastern New South Wales. It is a shrub with lance-shaped to oblong leaves and yellow flowers with about sixteen stamens arranged on one side of the two carpels.

== Description ==
Hibbertia bracteata is an erect, openly-branched shrub with glabrous branches that typically grows to a height of up to 100 cm (39 in). The leaves are lance-shaped with the narrower end towards the base, to oblong, 10–30 mm (0.39–1.18 in) long and 4–7 mm (0.16–0.28 in) wide with a small point on the end. The flowers are arranged in leaf axils or on the ends of branchlets and are sessile. Each flower sits on a ring of brown bracts. The sepals are 12–15 mm (0.47–0.59 in) long and densely silky-hairy, the petals yellow and about 10 mm (0.39 in) long. There are about sixteen stamens arranged on one side of the two silky-hairy carpels. Flowering occurs from late winter to summer.

== Taxonomy ==
This species was first described in 1817 by Augustin Pyramus de Candolle and given the name Pleurandra bracteata in Regni Vegetabilis Systema Naturale, from an unpublished description by Robert Brown (botanist, born 1773). In 1863, George Bentham changed the name to Hibbertia bracteata in Flora Australiensis.

== Distribution and habitat ==
Hibbertia bracteata is widespread in heath and forest in the Sydney district and in the Blue Mountains.
