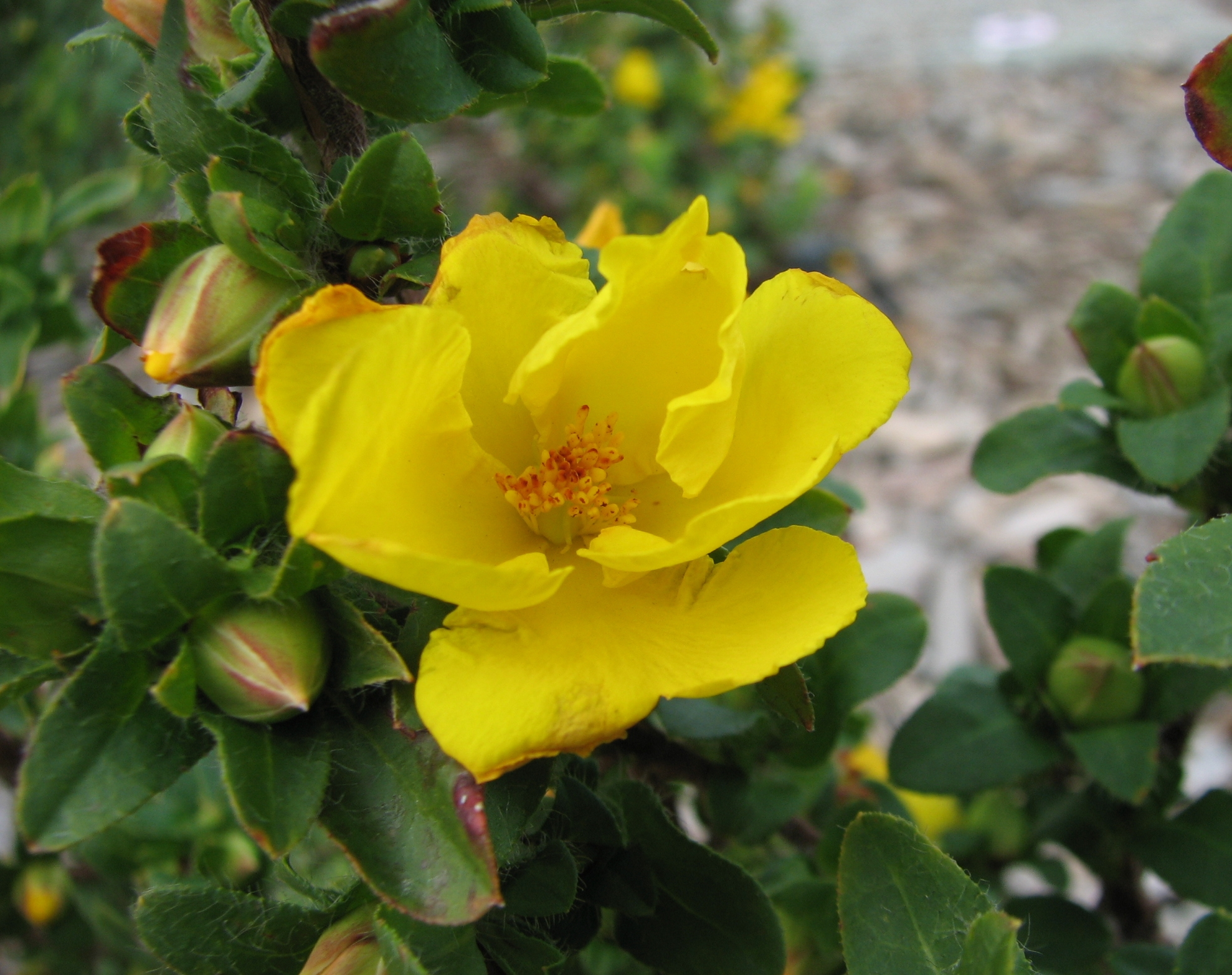
- Hibbertia serrata 'Sunshine'

Scientific classification
- Kingdom: Plantae
- Clade: Tracheophytes
- Clade: Angiosperms
- Clade: Eudicots
- Order: Dilleniales
- Family: Dilleniaceae
- Genus: Hibbertia
- Species: H. serrata

Binomial name
- Hibbertia serrata Hotchk.

= Hibbertia serrata =

Species of flowering plant

Hibbertia serrata, commonly known as serrate-leaved guinea-flower, is a species of flowering plant in the family Dilleniaceae and is endemic to the south-west of Western Australia. It is an erect shrub with softly-hairy foliage, elliptic to wedge-shaped leaves and yellow flowers with about twenty stamens arranged around two or three glabrous carpels.

== Description ==
Hibbertia serrata is an erect shrub that typically grows to a height of 0.1–1.5 m (3.9 in – 4 ft 11.1 in) and has softly-hairy foliage. The leaves are arranged alternately, elliptic to wedge-shaped, 50–90 mm (2.0–3.5 in) long and 12–27 mm (0.47–1.06 in) wide with a prominent mid-vein on the lower surface, the edges serrated. The flowers are sessile and arranged in leaf axils with two or three brown bracteoles 3.5 mm (0.14 in) long at the base. The five sepals are egg-shaped, 6–9 mm (0.24–0.35 in) long and softly hairy and the five petals are yellow, about 8 mm (0.31 in) long and broadly egg-shaped with the narrower end towards the base. There are about twenty stamens free from each other around the two or three glabrous carpels, each carpel with two ovules. Flowering occurs from August to December.

== Taxonomy ==
Hibbertia serrata was first formally described in 1954 by Arland Tillotson Hotchkiss based on plant material he collected in Pemberton in 1953. The specific epithet (serrata) means "saw-edged", referring to the leaves.

== Distribution and habitat ==
Serrate-leaved guinea-flower grows in a range of habitats in grey or black sand over limestone, laterite or granite-based soils. It occurs in the Jarrah Forest, Swan Coastal Plain and Warren biogeographic regions in the far south-west of Western Australia.

== Conservation status ==
This hibbertia is classified as "not threatened" by the Government of Western Australia Department of Biodiversity, Conservation and Attractions.
