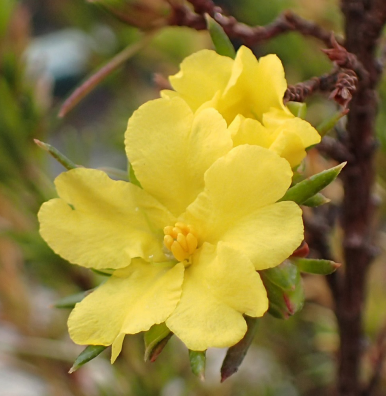
- Hibbertia mathinnicola flower

Scientific classification
- Kingdom: Plantae
- Clade: Tracheophytes
- Clade: Angiosperms
- Clade: Eudicots
- Order: Dilleniales
- Family: Dilleniaceae
- Genus: Hibbertia
- Species: H. mathinnicola

Binomial name
- Hibbertia mathinnicola Wapstra

= Hibbertia mathinnicola =

Species of flowering plants

Hibbertia mathinnicola is a species of Dilleniaceae endemic to Tasmania. It has a restricted distribution, only appearing on ridgelines and adjacent slopes of a Tasmanian sedentary substrate known as the Mathinna supergroup.

== Description ==
Hibbertia mathinnicola is an erect shrub which is typically between 0.3–0.6 m (1 ft 0 in – 2 ft 0 in) high. It is a multi-stemmed shrub that is generally dense and compact with a well-developed taproot. Its branches are typically short with lateral shoots. The leaves alternate, but are closely clustered together, and exhibit a dark green colour when fresh. They may appear yellow in highly exposed situations, but this is rare. Its petioles are very short, and its lamina is typically between 10–15 mm (0.39–0.59 in) long.

Its flowers are sessile and solitary, with paired bracts. Sepals are imbricate and light green, with occasional patches of a purple-brown colour, typically measuring around 4.5–6.5 mm (0.18–0.26 in) long. The flowering petals are bright yellow and easily detached during early stages.

== Taxonomy ==
Hibbertia mathinnicola was first formally described in 2021 by Mark Wapstra in the journal Swainsona from specimens collected in the Scamander Forest Reserve in 1983. The specific epithet (mathinnicola) means "mathinna dweller", referring to the Tasmanian substrate known as the Mathinna Supergroup, to where this species is restricted.

== Habitat and distribution ==
Hibbertia mathinnicola is native to the Northeast region of Tasmania. It has limited distribution and grows primarily in the subtropical biome. The species most commonly occurs in dry schlerophyll forest areas dominated by Eucalyptus sieberi. The understory of the area is very open, occurring at altitudes between 110–375 m (361–1,230 ft). Its distribution is heavily restricted. The species can only be found within the Hinterlands of the northeast coast, between Scamander and St Helens. Its total range of habitat is estimated to be approximately 95 km^{2} (37 sq mi), with a total area of occupancy of 0.43 km^{2} (0.17 sq mi). The abundance within this area is estimated to be above 15000 total plants.

== Threats and conservation ==
Hibbertia mathinnicola is only found on public lands in the Hinterlands area. Some small populations can be seen within legislative reserves, but most of the population is on public land. These sites are currently designated as Future Potential Production Forests (FPPF). This land is a land class described in the Forestry act 2014 as: Land established to secure 'wood bank' to provide for future sustainable forestry production in Tasmania. This puts Hibbertia mathinnicola at risk of forestry activity. It is also at risk of being trampled, as well as outcompeted by other plants and weeds.
