= Hibbertia cinerea =

Scientific classification
- Kingdom: Plantae
- Clade: Tracheophytes
- Clade: Angiosperms
- Clade: Eudicots
- Order: Dilleniales
- Family: Dilleniaceae
- Genus: Hibbertia
- Species: H. cinerea

Binomial name
- Hibbertia cinerea (R.Br. ex DC.) Toelken

Species of flowering plant

Hibbertia cinerea is a species of flowering plant in the family Dilleniaceae and is endemic to the southern part of the Eyre Peninsula in South Australia. It is a densely-branched, hairy shrub with narrow elliptic to lance-shaped leaves, and yellow flowers arranged on the ends of branchlet, with nine to twelve stamens arranged in a group on one side of the two carpels.

== Description ==
Hibbertia cinerea is a shrub that typically grows to a height of 0.3–1.2 m (1 ft 0 in – 3 ft 11 in) and is densely branched, the foliage covered with star-like hairs. The leaves are narrow elliptic to lance-shaped with the narrower end towards the base, mostly 6–10 mm (0.24–0.39 in) long and 2.5–4 mm (0.098–0.157 in) wide on a petiole 0.4–1.2 mm (0.016–0.047 in) long. The flowers are arranged on the ends of branchlets on a peduncle 3.5–6 mm (0.14–0.24 in) long, with linear bracts 2.8–5.1 mm (0.11–0.20 in) long. The five sepals are greyish-green and joined at the base, the two outer sepal lobes 3.1–5.2 mm (0.12–0.20 in) long and the inner lobes slightly shorter. The five petals are broadly egg-shaped with the narrower end towards the base, yellow, 5.2–12 mm (0.20–0.47 in) long with a shallow notch at the tip. There are nine to twelve stamens arranged in one group alongside the two carpels, each carpel with two ovules. Flowering occurs from August to December.

== Taxonomy ==
This species was first formally described in 1817 by Augustin Pyramus de Candolle in his book Regni Vegetabilis Systema Naturale and was given the name Pleurandra cinerea from an unpublished description by Robert Brown. In 1998, Hellmut R. Toelken changed the name to Hibbertia cinerea in the Journal of the Adelaide Botanic Gardens. The specific epithet (cinerea) means "ash-covered" or "grey".

== Distribution and habitat ==
This hibbertia grows in sandy soil in coastal scrub or low mallee vegetation on the southern tip of the Eyre Peninsula in South Australia.

== See also ==
- List of Hibbertia species
