= Hibbertia intermedia =

Scientific classification
- Kingdom: Plantae
- Clade: Tracheophytes
- Clade: Angiosperms
- Clade: Eudicots
- Order: Dilleniales
- Family: Dilleniaceae
- Genus: Hibbertia
- Species: H. intermedia

Binomial name
- Hibbertia intermedia (DC.) Toelken

Synonyms
- Pleurandra intermedia DC.

Species of flowering plant

Hibbertia intermedia is a species of flowering plant in the family Dilleniaceae and is endemic to New South Wales. It is a small shrublet with linear to narrow oblong leaves and yellow flowers usually with seven to nine stamens arranged in a single cluster.

== Description ==
Hibbertia intermedia is a shrublet with wiry, prostrate to low-lying branches and that typically grows to a height of up to 15 cm (5.9 in). The leaves are linear to narrow oblong, 2–4 mm (0.079–0.157 in) long and about 1 mm (0.039 in) wide on a petiole 0.2–0.7 mm (0.0079–0.0276 in) long. The flowers are arranged singly on the ends of branches on a stalk 2–5 mm (0.079–0.197 in) long with one or two linear to triangular bracts 1.8–2.8 mm (0.071–0.110 in) long at the base. The sepals are joined at the base, the outer lobes 4.5–5.1 mm (0.18–0.20 in) long the inner lobes slightly shorter. The petals are yellow, broadly egg-shaped with the narrower end towards the base, up to 6.8 mm (0.27 in) long with two lobes. There are seven to nine stamens in a single cluster on one side of the two hairy carpels, each carpel with two to four ovules. Flowering occurs from November to March.

== Taxonomy ==
This species was described in 1817 by Augustin Pyramus de Candolle who gave it the name Pleurandra intermedia in his Regni Vegetabilis Systema Naturale. In 2012 Hellmut R. Toelken changed the name to Hibbertia intermedia in the Journal of the Adelaide Botanic Gardens.

== Distribution and habitat ==
Hibbertia intermedia usually grows on west slopes in heath, scub or woodland on the Central Tablelands and Central Coast of New South Wales.
