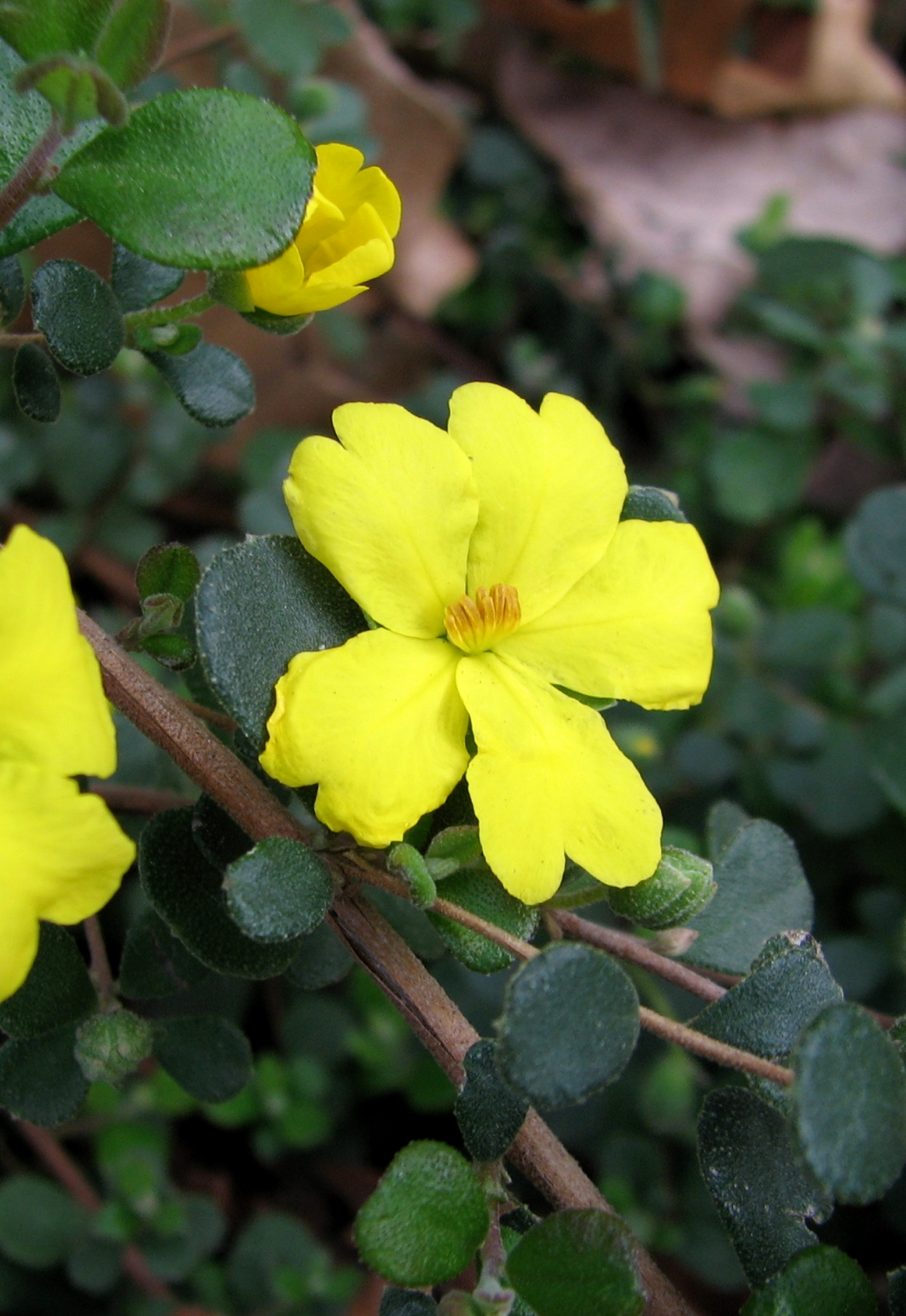
- In the Royal Botanic Gardens, Melbourne

Scientific classification
- Kingdom: Plantae
- Clade: Tracheophytes
- Clade: Angiosperms
- Clade: Eudicots
- Order: Dilleniales
- Family: Dilleniaceae
- Genus: Hibbertia
- Species: H. truncata

Binomial name
- Hibbertia truncata Toelken

= Hibbertia truncata =

Species of flowering plant

Hibbertia truncata, commonly known as Port Campbell guinea-flower, is a species of flowering plant in the family Dilleniaceae and is endemic to Victoria in Australia. It is a prostrate to low-lying shrub with hairy foliage, broadly egg-shaped leaves with the narrower end towards the base, and yellow flowers with ten to twelve stamens joined in a single cluster on one side of two hairy carpels.

== Description ==
Hibbertia truncata is a prostrate to low-lying shrub that typically grows to a height of up to 40 cm (16 in) and has hairy foliage. Its leaves are broadly egg-shaped with the narrower end towards the base, mostly 3.5–16 mm (0.14–0.63 in) long and 2–12 mm (0.079–0.472 in) wide on a petiole 0.4–1.2 mm (0.016–0.047 in) long. The flowers are mostly arranged singly on the end of side branches on a peduncle 3–16 mm (0.12–0.63 in) long with a linear bract 1.3–1.5 mm (0.051–0.059 in) long at the base. The five sepal are 3.6–5.5 mm (0.14–0.22 in) long and joined at the base. The petals are yellow, egg-shaped with the narrower end towards the base, 6.0–10.6 mm (0.24–0.42 in) long with ten to twelve stamens fused at the base on one side of two carpels, each carpel with five or six ovules. Flowering occurs from September to November.

== Taxonomy ==
Hibbertia truncata was first formally described in 1998 by Hellmut R. Toelken in the Journal of the Adelaide Botanic Gardens. The specific epithet (truncata) means "truncated" and refers to the leaf tips.

== Distribution and habitat ==
This hibbertia usually grows in coastal heath on limestone in a few places between Peterborough and Port Campbell in Victoria, and is locally common.

== See also ==
- List of Hibbertia species
