= Hibbertia malleolacea =

Scientific classification
- Kingdom: Plantae
- Clade: Tracheophytes
- Clade: Angiosperms
- Clade: Eudicots
- Order: Dilleniales
- Family: Dilleniaceae
- Genus: Hibbertia
- Species: H. malleolacea

Binomial name
- Hibbertia malleolacea Toelken

Species of plant

Hibbertia malleolacea is a species of flowering plant in the family Dilleniaceae and is endemic to the northern parts of the Northern Territory. It is a straggly shrub with hairy foliage, elliptic leaves, and yellow flowers arranged in leaf axils with 28 to 32 stamens arranged in bundles around three carpels.

== Description ==
Hibbertia malleolacea is a straggly shrub with few branches and that typically grows to a height of up to 1 m (3 ft 3 in) high, the foliage covered with rosette-like hairs. The leaves are elliptic to lance-shaped with the narrower end towards the base, 10–20 mm (0.39–0.79 in) long and 2–4.5 mm (0.079–0.177 in) wide on a petiole 0.2–1.2 mm (0.0079–0.0472 in) long. The flowers are arranged at the ends of branches on a thread-like peduncle 6–16 mm (0.24–0.63 in) long, with linear to lance-shaped bracts 1.1–1.4 mm (0.043–0.055 in) long. The five sepals are joined at the base, the two outer sepal lobes 2.4–2.9 mm (0.094–0.114 in) long and the inner lobes 4.2–4.5 mm (0.17–0.18 in) long. The five petals are broadly egg-shaped with the narrower end towards the base, yellow, 4.4–5.8 mm (0.17–0.23 in) long and there are 28 to 32 stamens arranged in bundles around the three carpels, each carpel with two ovules. Flowering occurs from December to June.

== Taxonomy ==
Hibbertia malleolacea was first formally described in 2010 by Hellmut R. Toelken in the Journal of the Adelaide Botanic Gardens from specimens collected near Jabiru in 1980. The specific epithet (malleolacea) means "like a mallet", referring to the shape of the peduncle.

== Distribution and habitat ==
This hibbertia grows in sandstone crevices in heath on the Arnhem Land Plateau.

== Conservation status ==
Hibbertia malleolacea is classified as of "least concern" under the Territory Parks and Wildlife Conservation Act 1976.

== See also ==
- List of Hibbertia species
