= Hibbertia orientalis =

Scientific classification
- Kingdom: Plantae
- Clade: Tracheophytes
- Clade: Angiosperms
- Clade: Eudicots
- Order: Dilleniales
- Family: Dilleniaceae
- Genus: Hibbertia
- Species: H. orientalis

Binomial name
- Hibbertia orientalis Toelken

Synonyms
- Hibbertia heterotricha Toelken nom. illeg.; Hibbertia melhanioides auct. non F.Muell.: Jessup, L.W. (2007)

Species of plant

Hibbertia orientalis is a species of flowering plant in the family Dilleniaceae and is endemic to Finch Island and White Islet in the Sir Edward Pellew Group. It is a small shrub with wiry branches, narrow lance-shaped leaves with the narrower end towards the base, and yellow flowers arranged singly on the ends of branchlets with 30 to 36 stamens arranged around two carpels.

== Description ==
Hibbertia orientalis is a shrub that typically grows to a height of 0.5 m (1 ft 8 in) with spreading wiry, angled, densely hairy branches. The leaves are lance-shaped with the narrower end towards the base, 9–16 mm (0.35–0.63 in) long and 2.5–4.5 mm (0.098–0.177 in) wide on a petiole 0.5–2 mm (0.020–0.079 in) long. The flowers are arranged on the ends of the branchlets, each flower on a stiff, thread-like peduncle 4.5–9.4 mm (0.18–0.37 in) long, with lance-shaped bracts 2.5–3.3 mm (0.098–0.130 in) long. The five sepals are joined at the base and 3.6–5.2 mm (0.14–0.20 in) long, the outer sepal lobes 2.4–2.7 mm (0.094–0.106 in) wide and the inner lobes 3.6–3.8 mm (0.14–0.15 in) wide. The five petals are broadly egg-shaped with the narrower end towards the base, yellow, 7.1–7.6 mm (0.28–0.30 in) long and there are 30 to 36 stamens arranged around the two carpels, each carpel with two ovules. Flowering has been observed in May.

== Taxonomy ==
Hibbertia orientalis was first formally described in 2010 by Hellmut R. Toelken in the Journal of the Adelaide Botanic Gardens from specimens collected in 1977 on White Islet in the Sir Edward Pellew Group. The specific epithet (orientalis) means "eastern", referring to the distribution of this species compared to similar hibbertias.

== Distribution and habitat ==
This hibbertia grows is only known from Finch Island and White Islet in the Sir Edward Pellew Group off the coast of the Northern Territory.

== Conservation status ==
Hibbertia orientalis is classified as of "data deficient" under the Territory Parks and Wildlife Conservation Act 1976.

== See also ==
- List of Hibbertia species
