= Hibbertia reticulata =

Scientific classification
- Kingdom: Plantae
- Clade: Tracheophytes
- Clade: Angiosperms
- Clade: Eudicots
- Order: Dilleniales
- Family: Dilleniaceae
- Genus: Hibbertia
- Species: H. reticulata

Binomial name
- Hibbertia reticulata Toelken

Species of flowering plant

Hibbertia reticulata is a species of flowering plant in the family Dilleniaceae and is endemic to north Queensland. It is a shrub with spreading branches, egg-shaped leaves with the narrower end towards the base, and yellow flowers arranged singly in leaf axils, with 32 to 48 stamens arranged in two or three groups around the two densely hairy carpels.

== Description ==
Hibbertia reticulata is a shrub that typically grows to a height of up to 2 m (6 ft 7 in) and has erect to spreading branches. The leaves are egg-shaped with the narrower end towards the base, mostly 15–50 mm (0.59–1.97 in) long and 10–20 mm (0.39–0.79 in) wide on a petiole 2–5 mm (0.079–0.197 in) long. The flowers are arranged singly in leaf axils near the ends of branches, each flower on a stiff peduncle 10.8–24.6 mm (0.43–0.97 in) long, with narrow oblong to spatula-shaped bracts 3.3–6.2 mm (0.13–0.24 in) long and 0.6–1.2 mm (0.024–0.047 in) wide near the base. The five sepals are joined at the base, the outer lobes 10.8–12.4 mm (0.43–0.49 in) long and 4.8–6.4 mm (0.19–0.25 in) wide, the inner lobes shorter but broader. The five petals are yellow, egg-shaped with the narrower end towards the base, 8.7–11.4 mm (0.34–0.45 in) long with a small notch at the tip, and there are between 32 and 48 stamens arranged in two or three groups around the two densely hairy carpels, each with four to six ovules. Flowering occurs from June to September.

== Taxonomy ==
Hibbertia reticulata was first formally described in 2012 by Hellmut R. Toelken in the Journal of the Adelaide Botanic Gardens from specimens collected by Barry John Conn and Andrew N.L. Doust near Tozer Gap in 1993. The specific epithet (reticulata) refers to the leaf veins, especially of young leaves.

== Distribution and habitat ==
This hibbertia mainly occurs on the Iron Range in northern Queensland, where it grows in open forest and woodland.

== See also ==
- List of Hibbertia species
