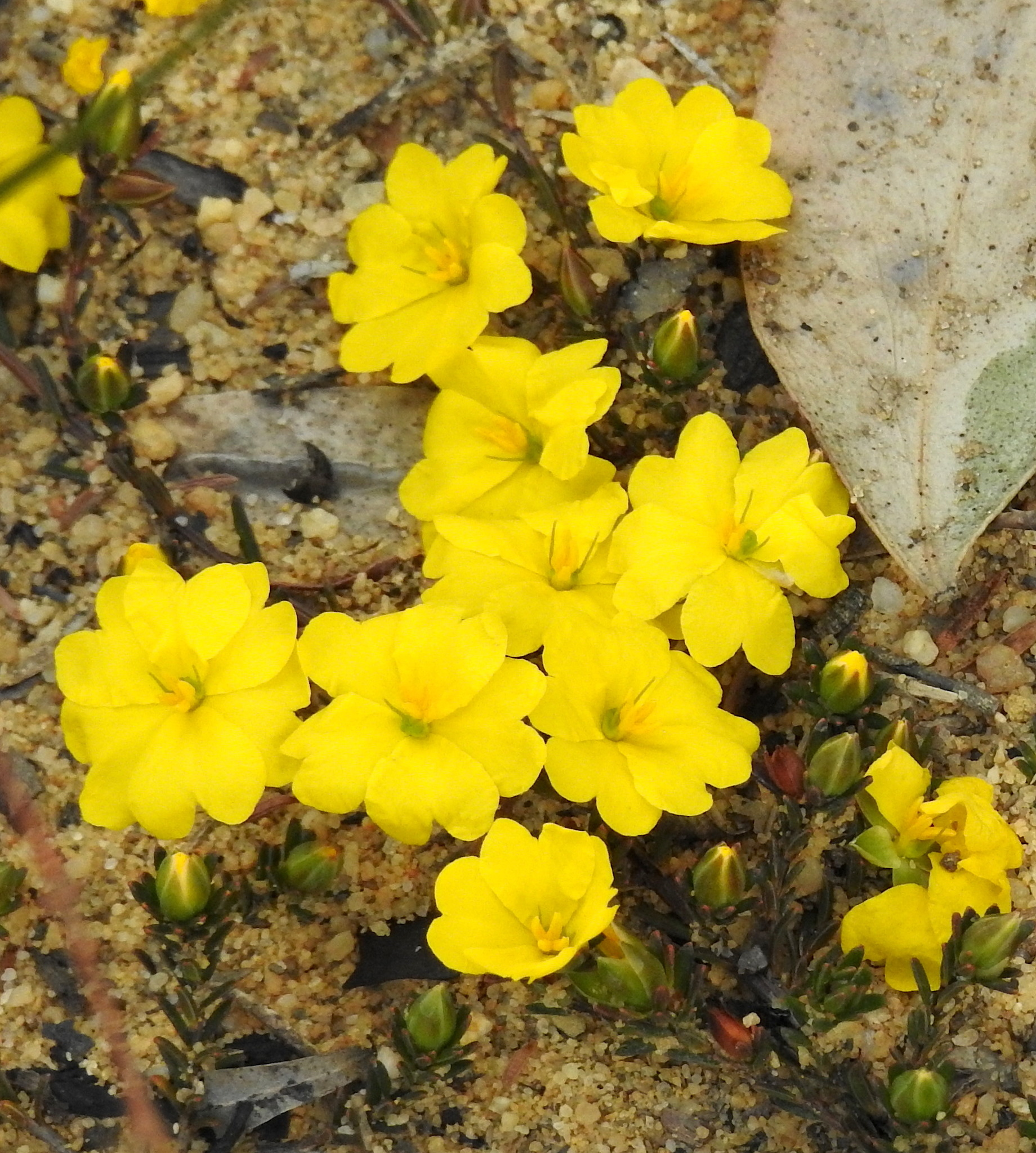

Scientific classification
- Kingdom: Plantae
- Clade: Tracheophytes
- Clade: Angiosperms
- Clade: Eudicots
- Order: Dilleniales
- Family: Dilleniaceae
- Genus: Hibbertia
- Species: H. pustulata

Binomial name
- Hibbertia pustulata Toelken

= Hibbertia pustulata =

Species of plant

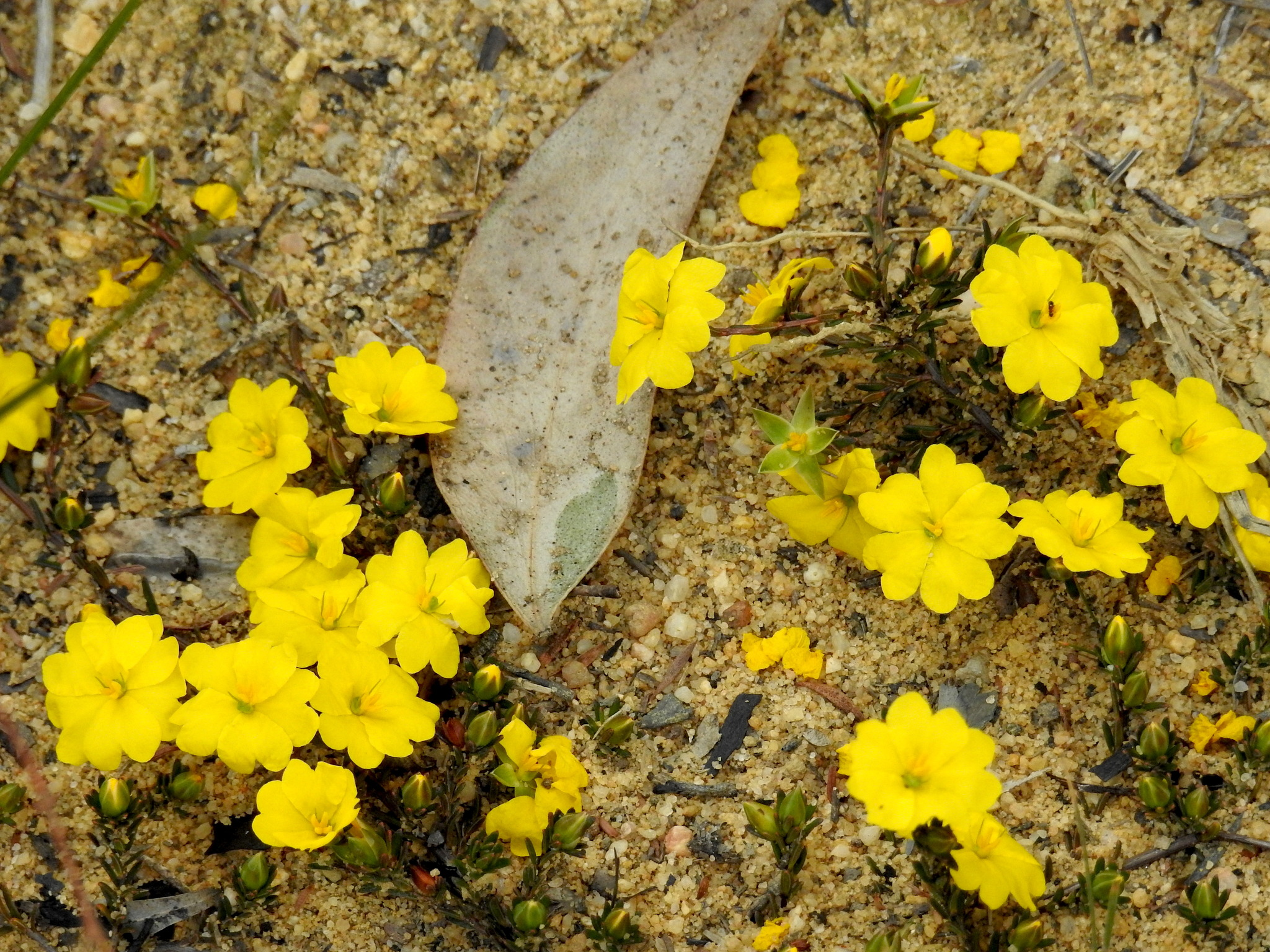
Habit

Hibbertia pustulata is a species of flowering plant in the family Dilleniaceae and is endemic to the Blue Mountains area in New South Wales. It is a small, low-lying shrub with more or less glabrous foliage, more or less linear leaves, and yellow flowers usually arranged singly on the ends of stems, the flowers with four stamens on one side of two glabrous carpels.

== Description ==
Hibbertia pustulata is a small shrub that typically grows to a height of up to 15 cm (5.9 in) and has more or less glabrous foliage. The leaves are more or less linear, mostly 6.0–7.5 mm (0.24–0.30 in) long, 0.6–0.8 mm (0.024–0.031 in) wide on a petiole 0.2–0.6 mm (0.0079–0.0236 in) long and with the edges rolled under. The flowers are arranged singly on the ends of branches with a triangular bract 0.7–1.1 mm (0.028–0.043 in) long at the base. The five sepals are joined at the base, the outer sepal lobes 5.9–6.3 mm (0.23–0.25 in) long and 2.5–2.6 mm (0.098–0.102 in) wide, the inner sepal lobes 3.2–3.4 mm (0.13–0.13 in) wide. The five petals are yellow, egg-shaped with the narrower end towards the base with a notch at the tip, 7.6–9.3 mm (0.30–0.37 in) long and there are four stamens fused at the base on one side of the two carpels, each carpel with four to six ovules. Flowering mainly occurs from August to October.

== Taxonomy ==
Hibbertia pustulata was first formally described in 2012 by Hellmut R. Toelken in the Journal of the Adelaide Botanic Gardens from specimens collected in Leura in 2006. The specific epithet (pustulata) means "pustulate".

== Distribution and habitat ==
This hibbertia grows in swampy heathland near creek lines and occurs in the Blue Mountains and Wollemi National Parks in central eastern New South Wales.

== See also ==
- List of Hibbertia species
