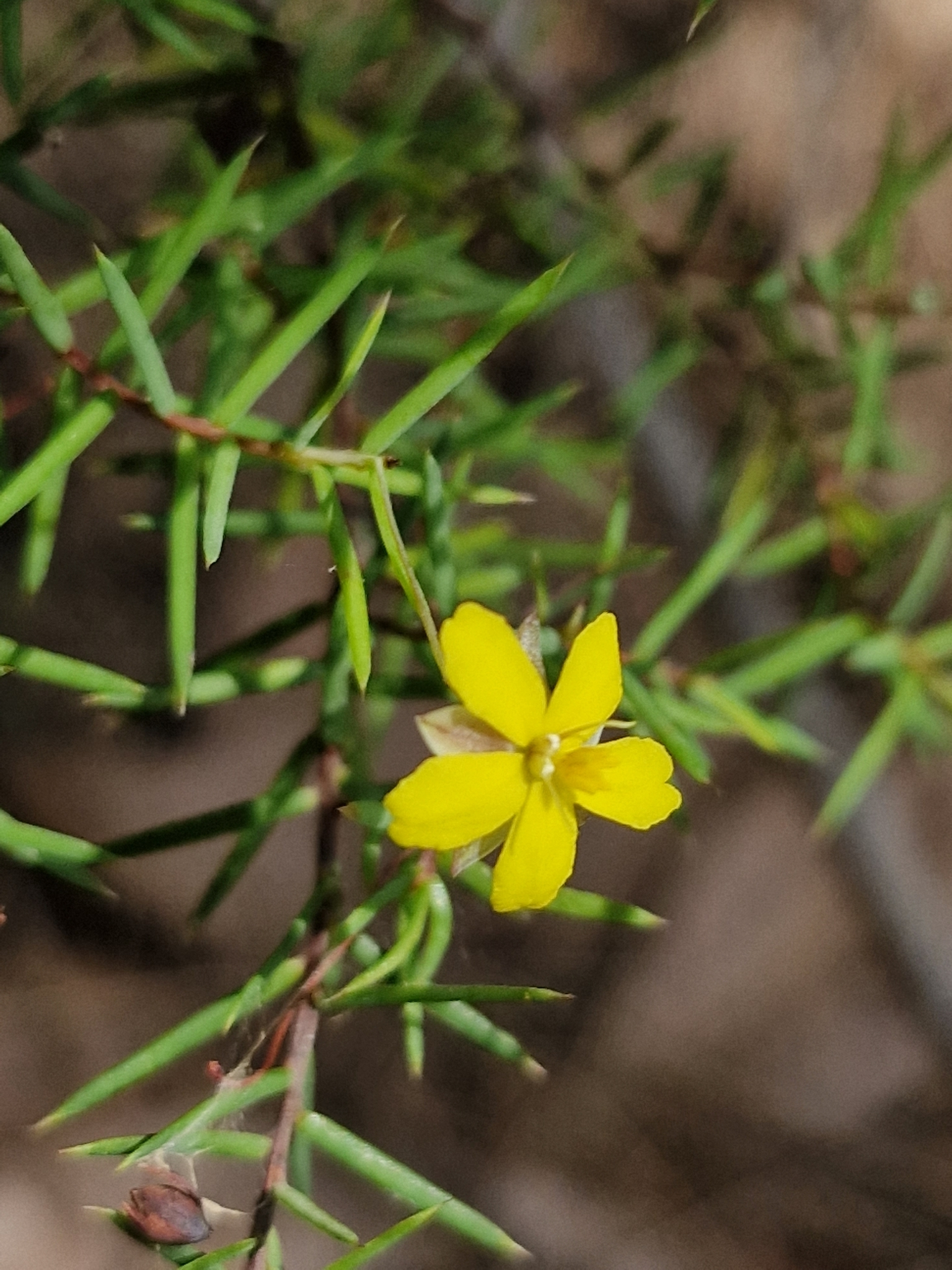
- In Heathcote National Park

Scientific classification
- Kingdom: Plantae
- Clade: Tracheophytes
- Clade: Angiosperms
- Clade: Eudicots
- Order: Dilleniales
- Family: Dilleniaceae
- Genus: Hibbertia
- Species: H. woronorana

Binomial name
- Hibbertia woronorana Toelken

= Hibbertia woronorana =

Species of flowering plant

Hibbertia woronorana is a species of flowering plant in the family Dilleniaceae and is endemic to a restricted area of New South Wales. It is a shrub with glabrous foliage, linear leaves with the edges curved downwards, and yellow flowers with five or six stamens joined at the base on one side of two softly-hairy carpels.

== Description ==
Hibbertia woronorana is a shrub that typically grows to a height of up to 1 m (3 ft 3 in) with glabrous foliage and many stiff, woody branches and stems. The leaves are linear, mostly 7–9 mm (0.28–0.35 in) long, 0.6–0.7 mm (0.024–0.028 in) wide on a petiole 0.2–0.5 mm (0.0079–0.0197 in) long, and with the edges curved downwards. The flowers are arranged singly on the ends of branches with linear bracts 0.6–0.8 mm (0.024–0.031 in) long at the base. The five sepal are joined at the base, the outer lobes 4.0–4.3 mm (0.16–0.17 in) long and 1.2–1.5 mm (0.047–0.059 in) wide, the inner lobes broader. The petals are yellow, lance-shaped with the narrower end towards the base, 3.9–5.0 mm (0.15–0.20 in) long with five or six stamens fused at the base on one side of two softly-hairy carpels, each carpel usually with two ovules. Flowering occurs from September to December.

== Taxonomy ==
Hibbertia woronorana was first formally described in 2012 by Hellmut R. Toelken in the Journal of the Adelaide Botanic Gardens from specimens collected by Ruurd Dirk Hoogland near the Woronora River. The specific epithet (woronorana) refers to the Woronora River, near where this species mainly occurs.

== Distribution and habitat ==
This hibbertia grows on rocky sandstone slopes along the mid and lower reaches of the Woronora River in New South Wales.

== See also ==
- List of Hibbertia species
