= Hibbertia suffrutescens =

Scientific classification
- Kingdom: Plantae
- Clade: Tracheophytes
- Clade: Angiosperms
- Clade: Eudicots
- Order: Dilleniales
- Family: Dilleniaceae
- Genus: Hibbertia
- Species: H. suffrutescens

Binomial name
- Hibbertia suffrutescens Toelken

Species of flowering plant

Hibbertia suffrutescens is a species of flowering plant in the family Dilleniaceae and is endemic to the Northern Kimberley region of Western Australia. It is a small shrub with wiry branches, narrowly lance-shaped leaves with the narrower end towards the base, and yellow flowers arranged singly along the branches, with 30 to 36 stamens arranged in groups around two densely scaly carpels.

== Description ==
Hibbertia suffrutescens is a shrub that typically grows to a height of up to 30 cm (12 in) and has only slightly woody main stems, and wiry branches, the foliage covered with rosette-like hairs. The leaves are narrowly lance-shaped with the narrower end towards the base, mostly 15–25 mm (0.59–0.98 in) long and 3–6 mm (0.12–0.24 in) wide on a petiole up to 0.5 mm (0.020 in) long. The flowers are arranged singly in leaf axils, each flower on a thread-like peduncle 8–12 mm (0.31–0.47 in) long, with narrowly lance-shaped to triangular bracts at the base. The five sepals are joined at the base, the two outer sepal lobes 4.0–4.5 mm (0.16–0.18 in) long and 2.1–2.7 mm (0.083–0.106 in) wide, and the inner lobes longer and broader. The five petals are broadly egg-shaped with the narrower end towards the base, yellow, 7.1–9.3 mm (0.28–0.37 in) long and there are 30 to 36 stamens arranged around the two densely scaly carpels, each carpel with two ovules.

== Taxonomy ==
Hibbertia suffrutescens was first formally described in 2010 by Hellmut R. Toelken in the Journal of the Adelaide Botanic Gardens from specimens collected near Kalumburu in 1985. The specific epithet (suffrutescens) means "slightly woody", referring to the shoots.

== Distribution and habitat ==
This hibbertia grows in sandy soil and in sandstone crevices in woodland in the Northern Kimberley region of northern Western Australia.

== Conservation status ==
Hibbertia suffrutescens is classified as "not threatened" by the Government of Western Australia Department of Parks and Wildlife.

== See also ==
- List of Hibbertia species
