= Hibbertia incompta =

Scientific classification
- Kingdom: Plantae
- Clade: Tracheophytes
- Clade: Angiosperms
- Clade: Eudicots
- Order: Dilleniales
- Family: Dilleniaceae
- Genus: Hibbertia
- Species: H. incompta

Binomial name
- Hibbertia incompta Toelken

Species of plant

Hibbertia incompta is a species of flowering plant in the family Dilleniaceae and is endemic to the Northern Territory. It is a weakly stemmed, often prostrate shrublet with hairy foliage, linear to elliptic leaves, and yellow flowers arranged in leaf axils with 45 to 60 stamens arranged in groups around the two or three carpels.

== Description ==
Hibbertia incompta is a weakly stemmed, often prostrate shrublet that typically grows to a height of up to 30 cm (12 in) and has hairy foliage. The leaves are linear to elliptic, 35–70 mm (1.4–2.8 in) long and 3–8 mm (0.12–0.31 in) wide and sessile or on a petiole up to 3 mm (0.12 in) long. As the leaves age, the edges roll under and the leaves become narrower. The flowers are arranged singly in leaf axils on a thick peduncle 15–25 mm (0.59–0.98 in) long, with linear bracts about 2.5 mm (0.098 in) long. The five sepals are joined at the base, the two outer sepal lobes 9.3–10.2 mm (0.37–0.40 in) long and the inner lobes slightly longer. The five petals are wedge-shaped to egg-shaped with the narrower end towards the base, yellow, about 9 mm (0.35 in) long. There are 45 to 60 stamens arranged in groups around the two or three carpels, each carpel with four ovules.

== Taxonomy ==
Hibbertia incompta was first formally described in 2010 by Hellmut R. Toelken in the Journal of the Adelaide Botanic Gardens from specimens collected near Jabiru in 1981. The specific epithet (incompta) means "inelegant", referring to the wildly spreading hairs on the lower side of the leaves.

== Distribution and habitat ==
This hibbertia grows in woodland in sandy soil below the Arnhem Land Plateau in the northern part of the Northern Territory.

== Conservation status ==
Hibbertia incompta is classified as "data deficient" under the Territory Parks and Wildlife Conservation Act 1976.

== See also ==
- List of Hibbertia species
