= Hibbertia stelligera =

Scientific classification
- Kingdom: Plantae
- Clade: Tracheophytes
- Clade: Angiosperms
- Clade: Eudicots
- Order: Dilleniales
- Family: Dilleniaceae
- Genus: Hibbertia
- Species: H. stelligera

Binomial name
- Hibbertia stelligera Toelken

Species of flowering plant

Hibbertia stelligera is a species of flowering plant in the family Dilleniaceae and is endemic to Queensland. It is a small, multi-stemmed shrub with linear leaves and yellow flowers arranged singly near the ends of branches, with 20 to 32 stamens arranged in bundles around two densely scaly carpels.

== Description ==
Hibbertia stelligera is a multi-stemmed shrub that typically grows to a height of up to 50 cm (20 in) and has its foliage covered with rosette-like hairs. The leaves are linear, mostly 7–19 mm (0.28–0.75 in) long and 0.8–2.2 mm (0.031–0.087 in) wide on a petiole 0.2–0.6 mm (0.0079–0.0236 in) long. The flowers are arranged singly at the end of branches or in leaf axils, each flower on a thread-like peduncle 6–9 mm (0.24–0.35 in) long, with oblong bracts at the base. The five sepals are joined at the base, the two outer sepal lobes 2.4–2.8 mm (0.094–0.110 in) long and 2.3–2.7 mm (0.091–0.106 in) wide, and the inner lobes longer and broader. The five petals are egg-shaped with the narrower end towards the base, yellow, 6.4–11.2 mm (0.25–0.44 in) long and there are 20 to 32 stamens arranged in groups around the two densely scaly carpels, each carpel with two ovules.

== Taxonomy ==
This hibbertia was first formally described in 1936 by Cyril Tenison White who gave it the name Hibbertia stirlingii f. stelligera in the Proceedings of the Royal Society of Queensland from specimens collected in 1934 by Leonard John Brass near Ravenshoe at an altitude of 3,000 ft (910 m). In 2010, Hellmut R. Toelken raised the form to species status as Hibbertia stelligera. The specific epithet (stelligera) means "star-bearing".

== Distribution and habitat ==
This hibbertia grows in woodland with a heathy understorey in northern Queensland.

== Conservation status ==
Hibbertia stelligera is classified as "least concern" under the Queensland Government Nature Conservation Act 1992.

== See also ==
- List of Hibbertia species
