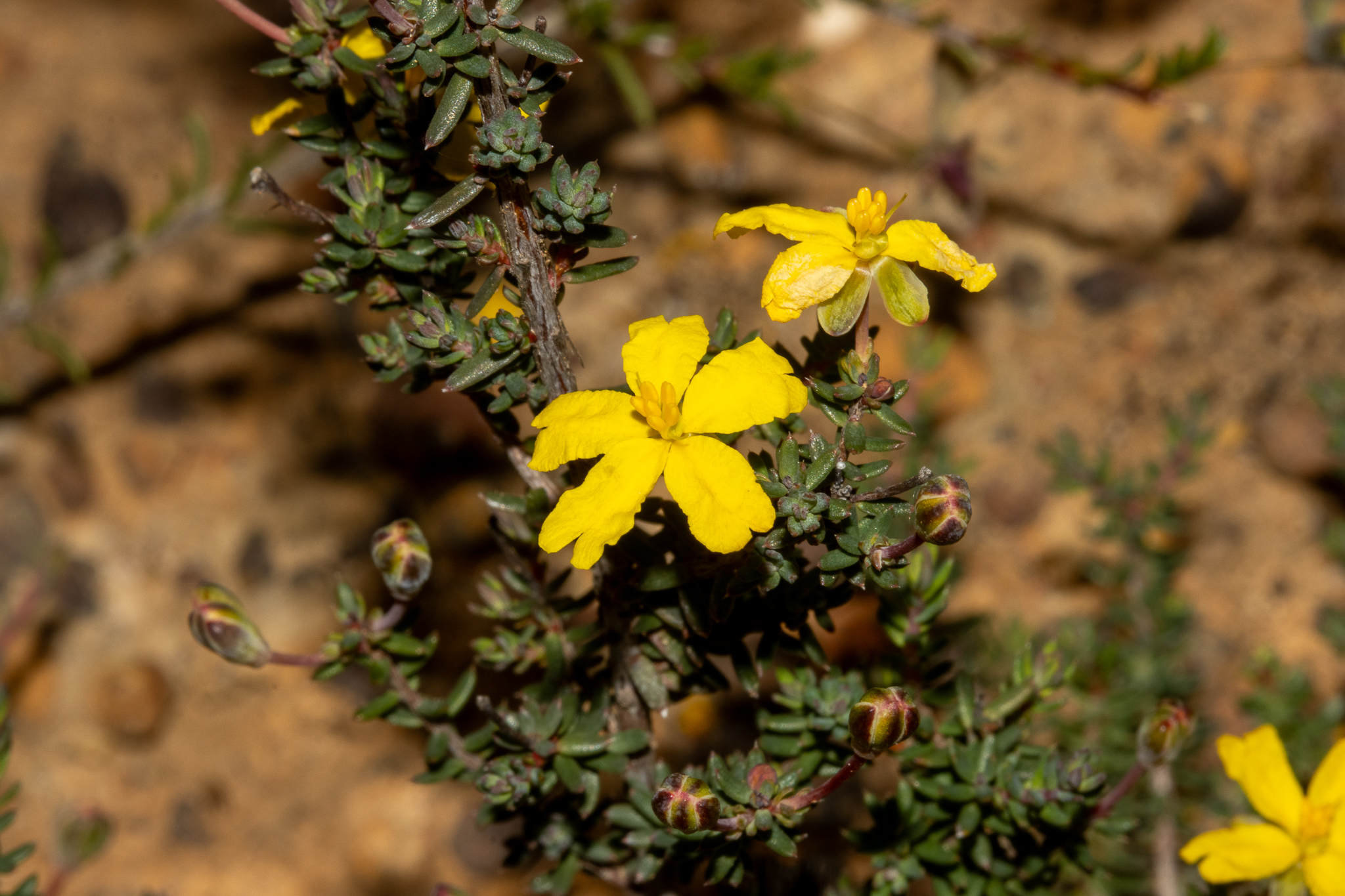

Scientific classification
- Kingdom: Plantae
- Clade: Tracheophytes
- Clade: Angiosperms
- Clade: Eudicots
- Order: Dilleniales
- Family: Dilleniaceae
- Genus: Hibbertia
- Species: H. obtusibracteata

Binomial name
- Hibbertia obtusibracteata Toelken

= Hibbertia obtusibracteata =

Species of plant

Hibbertia obtusibracteata is a species of flowering plant in the family Dilleniaceae and is endemic to Kangaroo Island in South Australia. It is a much-branched shrub with linear leaves and bright yellow flowers, usually with six stamens arranged in a cluster on one side of two glabrous carpels.

== Description ==
Hibbertia obtusibracteata is a shrub that typically grows to a height of 15–40 cm (5.9–15.7 in) with many spreading to low-lying branches. The leaves are linear, 2.8–4.4 mm (0.11–0.17 in) long and 0.4–0.6 mm (0.016–0.024 in) wide on a petiole 0.1–0.3 mm (0.0039–0.0118 in) long, with the edges rolled under. The flowers are arranged on short side shoots on a peduncle 4.4–19.5 mm (0.17–0.77 in) long, with a rounded bract 0.6–1.6 mm (0.024–0.063 in) long on the peduncle. The five sepals are 3.4–4.8 mm (0.13–0.19 in) long, oblong to egg-shaped, tinged red and glabrous and the five petals are yellow and egg-shaped with the narrower end towards the base, 4.2–6.6 mm (0.17–0.26 in) long. There are usually six stamens in a single cluster on one side of the two glabrous carpels.

== Taxonomy ==
Hibbertia obtusibracteata was first formally described in 1995 by Hellmut R. Toelken in the Journal of the Adelaide Botanic Gardens from specimens collected on Kangaroo Island by Robert John Bates in 1986. The specific epithet (obtusibracteata) refers to the obtuse bracts of this species.

== Distribution and habitat ==
This hibbertia only occurs on Kangaroo Island where it grows in scrub and heath.

== See also ==
- List of Hibbertia species
