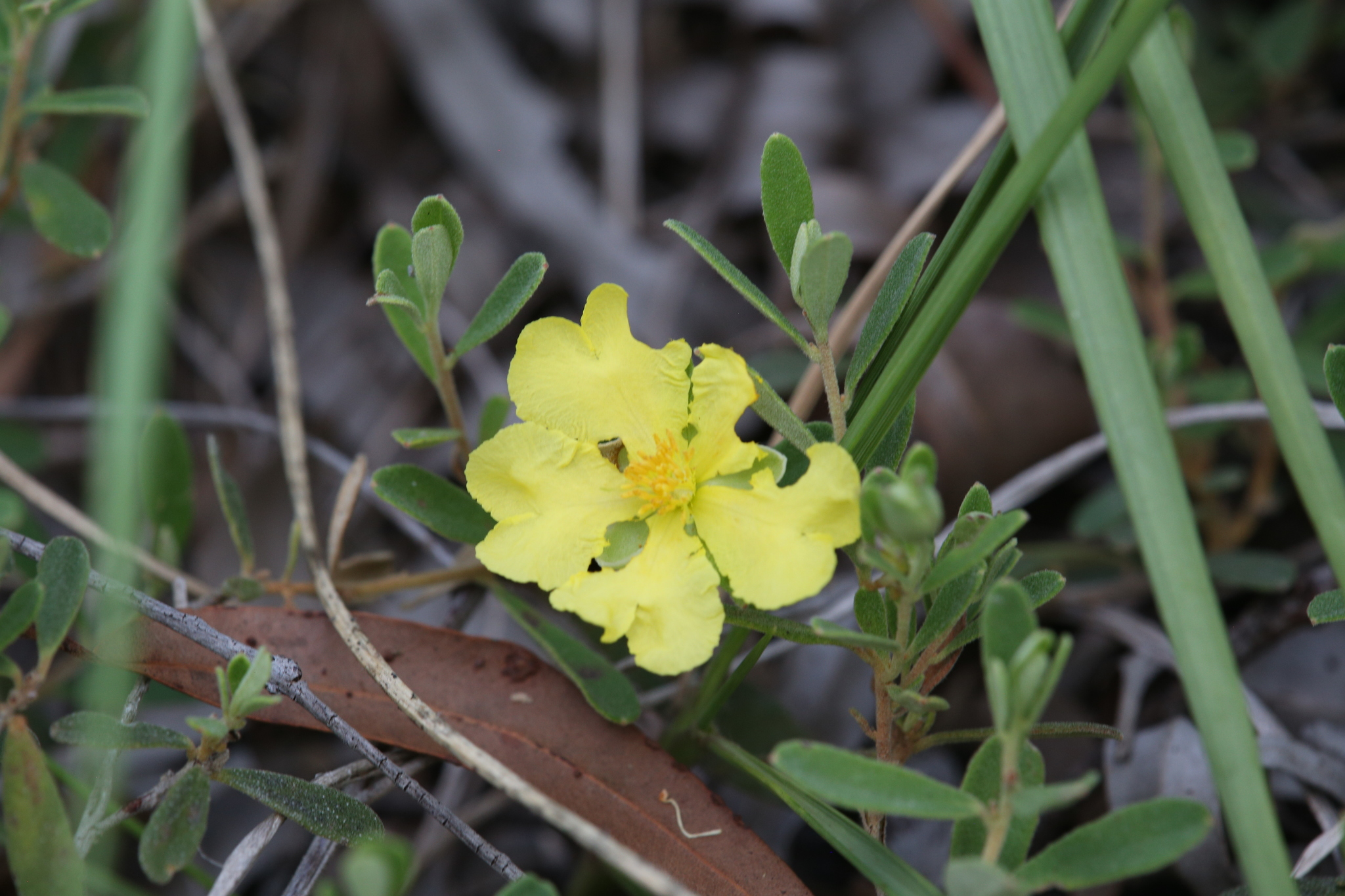

Scientific classification
- Kingdom: Plantae
- Clade: Tracheophytes
- Clade: Angiosperms
- Clade: Eudicots
- Order: Dilleniales
- Family: Dilleniaceae
- Genus: Hibbertia
- Species: H. araneolifera

Binomial name
- Hibbertia araneolifera Toelken

= Hibbertia araneolifera =

Species of flowering plant

Hibbertia araneolifera is a species of flowering plant in the family Dilleniaceae and is endemic to Queensland. It is a small shrub with wiry branches, narrow elliptic to lance-shaped leaves and yellow flowers arranged singly in leaf axils, with forty to forty-four stamens arranged around the three carpels.

== Description ==
Hibbertia araneolifera is a small shrub that typically grows to a height of 20–60 cm (7.9–23.6 in), its branches and leaves covered with rosette-like bundles of hairs. The leaves are narrow elliptic to lance-shaped with the narrower end towards the base, 8–20 mm (0.31–0.79 in) long and 3.5–6.5 mm (0.14–0.26 in) wide on a petiole 0.4–1.5 mm (0.016–0.059 in) long. The flowers are arranged singly in leaf axils mainly towards the ends of branchlets on a peduncle 5.2–8.3 mm (0.20–0.33 in) long, with linear to lance-shaped bracts 1.8–3.1 mm (0.071–0.122 in) long. The five sepals are joined at the base, the two outer sepal lobes 6.1–6.5 mm (0.24–0.26 in) long and the inner lobes distinctly shorter. The five petals are egg-shaped with the narrower end towards the base, yellow, 7.5–9.1 mm (0.30–0.36 in) long and there are forty to forty-four stamens arranged around the three carpels, each carpel with two ovules. Flowering occurs from May to September.

== Taxonomy ==
Hibbertia araneolifera was first formally described in 2010 by Hellmut R. Toelken in the Journal of the Adelaide Botanic Gardens from specimens collected by Stanley Thatcher Blake near Isabella Falls in 1970. The specific epithet (araneolifera) means "spider-small-bearing", referring to the hairs on the leaves that resemble spiders carrying hundreds of young on their backs.

== Distribution and habitat ==
This hibbertia grows on stony ridges in forest in northern Queensland.

== Conservation status ==
Hibbertia araneolifera is classified as of "least concern" under the Queensland Government Nature Conservation Act 1992.

== See also ==
- List of Hibbertia species
