= Hibbertia guttata =

Scientific classification
- Kingdom: Plantae
- Clade: Tracheophytes
- Clade: Angiosperms
- Clade: Eudicots
- Order: Dilleniales
- Family: Dilleniaceae
- Genus: Hibbertia
- Species: H. guttata

Binomial name
- Hibbertia guttata Toelken

Species of plant

Hibbertia guttata is a species of flowering plant in the family Dilleniaceae and is endemic to the Northern Territory. It is a straggly shrub with moderately to densely hairy foliage, linear to elliptic leaves, and yellow flowers arranged in leaf axils with 28 to 36 stamens arranged in groups around the three carpels.

== Description ==
Hibbertia guttata is a straggly shrub that typically grows to a height of 1.0 m (3 ft 3 in) with few branches and moderately to densely hairy foliage. The leaves are linear to elliptic, 20–35 mm (0.79–1.38 in) long and 1.9–4.0 mm (0.075–0.157 in) wide on a petiole 0.3–1.0 mm (0.012–0.039 in) long. The flowers are arranged singly in leaf axils on a peduncle 13–34 mm (0.51–1.34 in) long, with triangular bracts 3.2–5.3 mm (0.13–0.21 in) long. The five sepals are joined at the base, the two outer sepal lobes 5.8–8.1 mm (0.23–0.32 in) long and the inner lobes up to twice as long as the inner lobes. The five petals are egg-shaped with the narrower end towards the base, yellow, 9.8–12.3 mm (0.39–0.48 in) long. There are twenty-eight to thirty-six stamens arranged in groups with a few staminodes, around the three carpels, each carpel with two ovules.

== Taxonomy ==
Hibbertia guttata was first formally described in 2010 by Hellmut R. Toelken in the Journal of the Adelaide Botanic Gardens from specimens collected by Lyndley Craven on the Arnhem Land Plateau in 1973. The specific epithet (guttata) means "spotted", referring to the pale scales scattered over the whole plant.

== Distribution and habitat ==
This hibbertia grows in woodland and shrubland, often in sheltered places between rocks, in Kakadu National Park and Arnhem Land in the northern part of the Northern Territory.

== Conservation status ==
Hibbertia guttata is classified as "near threatened" under the Territory Parks and Wildlife Conservation Act 1976.

== See also ==
- List of Hibbertia species
