= Hibbertia scopata =

Scientific classification
- Kingdom: Plantae
- Clade: Tracheophytes
- Clade: Angiosperms
- Clade: Eudicots
- Order: Dilleniales
- Family: Dilleniaceae
- Genus: Hibbertia
- Species: H. scopata

Binomial name
- Hibbertia scopata Toelken

Species of flowering plant

Hibbertia scopata is a species of flowering plant in the family Dilleniaceae and is endemic to the Northern Kimberley region of Western Australia. It is a small shrub with wiry branches, lance-shaped leaves with the narrower end towards the base, and yellow flowers arranged singly along the branches, with thirteen to fifteen stamens arranged in groups around two densely scaly carpels.

== Description ==
Hibbertia scopata is a shrub that typically grows to a height of up to 30 cm (12 in) and has few main stems and wiry branches, the foliage covered with rosette-like hairs. The leaves are lance-shaped with the narrower end towards the base, mostly 4–8 mm (0.16–0.31 in) long and 3.0–5.5 mm (0.12–0.22 in) wide on a petiole 0.4–0.8 mm (0.016–0.031 in) long. The flowers are arranged singly in leaf axils, each flower on a thread-like peduncle 3.1–4.6 mm (0.12–0.18 in) long, with linear to lance-shaped bracts at the base. The five sepals are joined at the base, the two outer sepal lobes 4.6–5.2 mm (0.18–0.20 in) long and 2.4–2.6 mm (0.094–0.102 in) wide, and the inner lobes slightly shorter. The five petals are egg-shaped with the narrower end towards the base, yellow, 4.5–4.9 mm (0.18–0.19 in) long and there are thirteen to fifteen stamens arranged in groups around the two densely scaly carpels, each carpel with two ovules.

== Taxonomy ==
Hibbertia scopata was first formally described in 2010 by Hellmut R. Toelken in the Journal of the Adelaide Botanic Gardens from specimens collected near the mouth of the Drysdale River in 1993. The specific epithet (scopata) means "densely covered with bristly hairs".

== Distribution and habitat ==
This hibbertia grows in sandstone crevices near the Drysdale River mouth in the Northern Kimberley region of northern Western Australia.

== Conservation status ==
Hibbertia scopata is classified as "not threatened" by the Government of Western Australia Department of Parks and Wildlife.

== See also ==
- List of Hibbertia species
