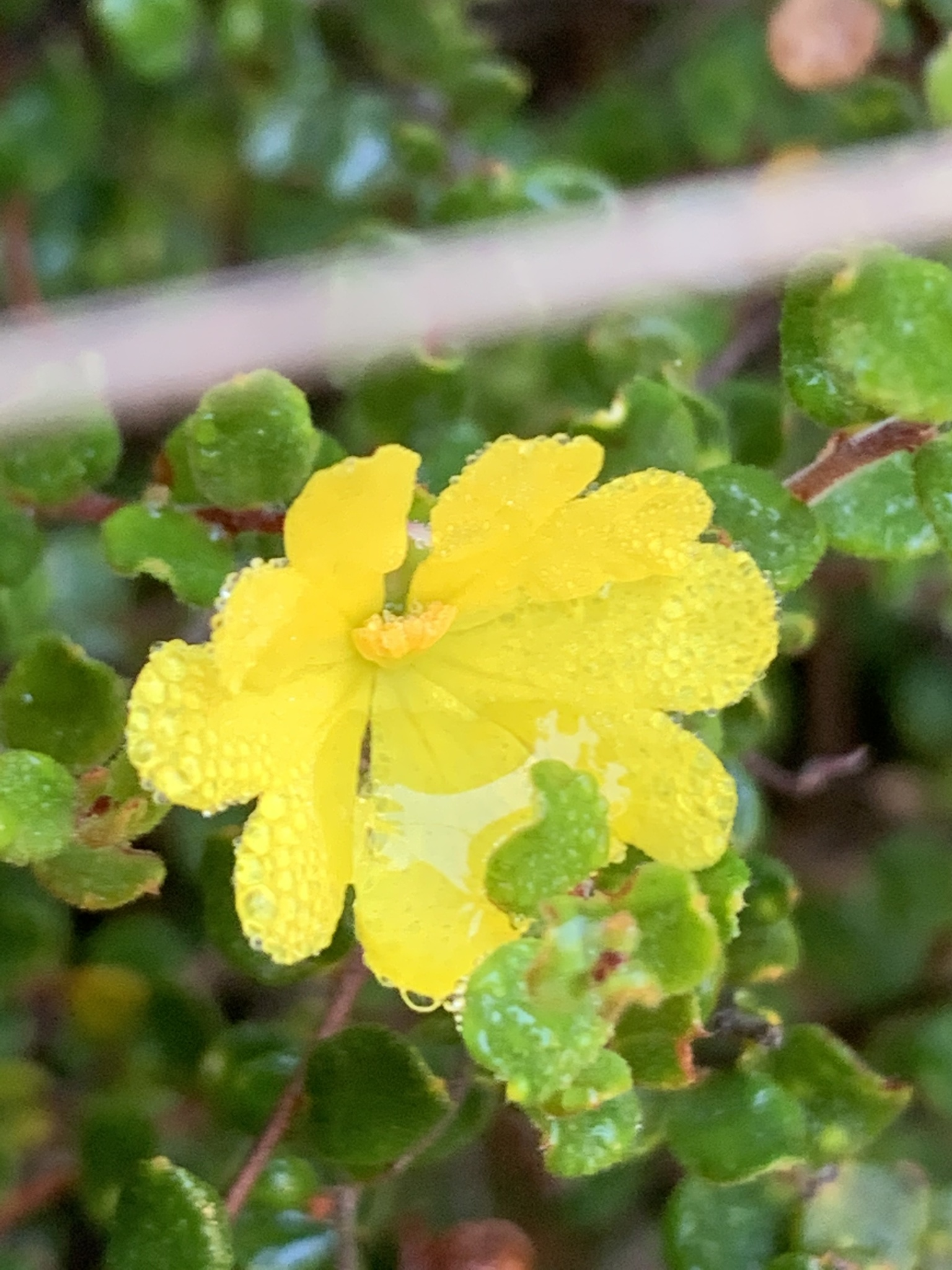
- In the Blue Mountains National Park

Scientific classification
- Kingdom: Plantae
- Clade: Tracheophytes
- Clade: Angiosperms
- Clade: Eudicots
- Order: Dilleniales
- Family: Dilleniaceae
- Genus: Hibbertia
- Species: H. decumbens

Binomial name
- Hibbertia decumbens Toelken

= Hibbertia decumbens =

Species of flowering plant

Hibbertia decumbens is a species of flowering plant in the family Dilleniaceae and is endemic to a restricted area of New South Wales. It is a spreading, almost prostrate shrub with hairy foliage, egg-shaped to almost round leaves, and yellow flowers usually with nine to twelve stamens arranged in a group on one side of two carpels.

== Description ==
Hibbertia decumbens is a spreading to almost prostrate shrub that typically grows to a height of up to 40 cm (16 in), the foliage covered with simple and star-like hairs. The leaves are egg-shaped with the narrower end towards the base to almost round, 4–8.5 mm (0.16–0.33 in) long and 2.5–6 mm (0.098–0.236 in) wide on a petiole 0.4–1.0 mm (0.016–0.039 in) long. The flowers are arranged on the ends of branchlets on a peduncle 5–10 mm (0.20–0.39 in) long, with linear bracts 1.1–1.5 mm (0.043–0.059 in) long. The five sepals are joined at the base, the sepal lobes 3.3–4.4 mm (0.13–0.17 in) long. The five petals are egg-shaped to wedge-shaped with the narrower end towards the base, bright yellow, 3.8–7.2 mm (0.15–0.28 in) long with a notch at the tip. There are usually nine to twelve stamens arranged in one group alongside the two woolly-hairy carpels, each carpel with two ovules. Flowering occurs from October to January.

== Taxonomy ==
Hibbertia decumbens was first formally described in 1998 by Hellmut R. Toelken in the Journal of the Adelaide Botanic Gardens from specimens collected near Wentworth Falls in 1987. The specific epithet (decumbens) means prostrate, but with rising tips.

== Distribution and habitat ==
This hibbertia grows on sandstone ledges in a few locations in the Blue Mountains.

== See also ==
- List of Hibbertia species
