= Hibbertia marrawalina =

Scientific classification
- Kingdom: Plantae
- Clade: Tracheophytes
- Clade: Angiosperms
- Clade: Eudicots
- Order: Dilleniales
- Family: Dilleniaceae
- Genus: Hibbertia
- Species: H. marrawalina

Binomial name
- Hibbertia marrawalina Toelken

Species of plant

Hibbertia marrawalina is a species of flowering plant in the family Dilleniaceae and is endemic to a restricted part of the Northern Territory. It is a shrublet with scaly foliage, wiry branches, narrow linear leaves, and yellow flowers arranged singly in leaf axils with fifteen to eighteen stamens and about seven staminodes arranged in bundles around two scaly carpels.

== Description ==
Hibbertia marrawalina is a straggly shrub with many wiry branches and that typically grows to a height of up to 30 cm (12 in) high, the foliage covered with shield-shaped scales. The leaves are narrow linear, 30–45 mm (1.2–1.8 in) long, 0.6–0.8 mm (0.024–0.031 in) wide and more or less sessile. The flowers are arranged singly in leaf axils near the ends of branches on a stiff peduncle 5.3–10.6 mm (0.21–0.42 in) long, with linear to triangular bracts 0.9–1.2 mm (0.035–0.047 in) long. The five sepals are joined at the base, the two outer sepal lobes 3.1–3.5 mm (0.12–0.14 in) long and the inner lobes 3.6–4.1 mm (0.14–0.16 in) long. The five petals are wedge-shaped to egg-shaped with the narrower end towards the base, yellow, 4.6–5.9 mm (0.18–0.23 in) long and there are fifteen to eighteen stamens and about seven staminodes arranged in bundles around the two scaly carpels, each carpel with two ovules. Flowering occurs in April.

== Taxonomy ==
Hibbertia marrawalina was first formally described in 2010 by Hellmut R. Toelken in the Journal of the Adelaide Botanic Gardens from specimens collected in Nitmiluk National Park in 2002. The specific epithet (marrawalina) means "belonging to the Marrawal Plateau", where this species is apparently endemic.

== Distribution and habitat ==
This hibbertia grows in tall woodland in sandy soil on the Marrawal Plateau on the boundary of the Kakadu and Nitmiluk National Parks in the northern part of the Northern Territory.

== Conservation status ==
Hibbertia marrawalina is classified as "data deficient" under the Territory Parks and Wildlife Conservation Act 1976.

== See also ==
- List of Hibbertia species
