= Hibbertia stichodonta =

Scientific classification
- Kingdom: Plantae
- Clade: Tracheophytes
- Clade: Angiosperms
- Clade: Eudicots
- Order: Dilleniales
- Family: Dilleniaceae
- Genus: Hibbertia
- Species: H. stichodonta

Binomial name
- Hibbertia stichodonta Toelken

Species of flowering plant

Hibbertia stichodonta is a species of flowering plant in the family Dilleniaceae and is endemic to coastal New South Wales. It is a small, spreading shrub with a few wiry, hairy branches, linear to oblong leaves and yellow flowers with 22 to 30 stamens arranged around three hairy carpels.

== Description ==
Hibbertia stichodonta is a shrub that typically grows to a height of up to 30 cm (12 in) and has a few spreading, wiry, hairy branches. The leaves are linear to oblong, mostly 4.5–7.5 mm (0.18–0.30 in) long and 0.7–1 mm (0.028–0.039 in) wide on a petiole 0.2–0.5 mm (0.0079–0.0197 in) long. The flowers are arranged singly on the ends of the branches and are sessile with linear, leaf-like bracts mostly 3.0–4.5 mm (0.12–0.18 in) long at the base. The five sepals are joined at the base, the outer sepal lobes 7–8 mm (0.28–0.31 in) long and about 3 mm (0.12 in) wide, the inner lobes broader. The five petals are broadly egg-shaped with the narrower end towards the base, yellow, up to 10.4 mm (0.41 in) long with 22 to 30 stamens arranged around three hairy carpels, each carpel with four ovules. Flowering occurs from September to November.

== Taxonomy ==
Hibbertia stichodonta was first formally described in 2013 by Hellmut R. Toelken in the Journal of the Adelaide Botanic Gardens from specimens collected near Budgewoi in 1993. The specific epithet (stichodonta) "in-rows-toothed" referring to teeth on the lower sides of the leaves.

== Distribution and habitat ==
This hibbertia grows in forest on low hills on the North and Central Coasts of New South Wales.

== See also ==
- List of Hibbertia species
