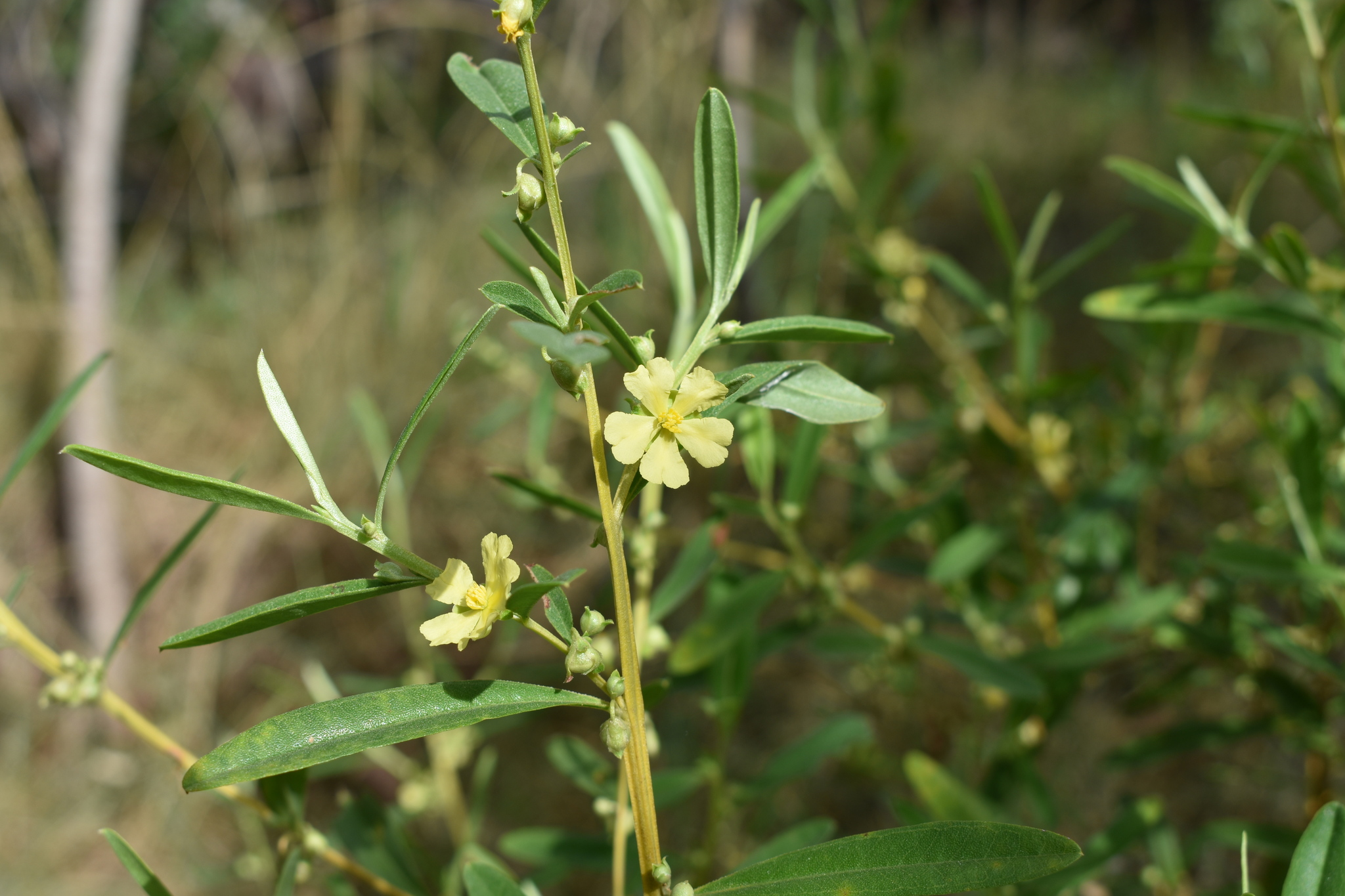

Scientific classification
- Kingdom: Plantae
- Clade: Tracheophytes
- Clade: Angiosperms
- Clade: Eudicots
- Order: Dilleniales
- Family: Dilleniaceae
- Genus: Hibbertia
- Species: H. brevipedunculata

Binomial name
- Hibbertia brevipedunculata Toelken

= Hibbertia brevipedunculata =

Species of flowering plant

Hibbertia brevipedunculata is a species of flowering plant in the family Dilleniaceae and is endemic to northern Australia. It grows as a sub-shrub with hairy foliage, linear to lance-shaped leaves with the narrow end towards the base, and yellow flowers arranged singly on the ends of branches or short side shoots, with thirty to forty-four stamens arranged in bundles around the two carpels.

== Description ==
Hibbertia brevipedunculata is a multi-stemmed sub-shrub that typically grows to a height of up to 60 cm (24 in), its branches ribbed below the leaf axils and its foliage more or less densely hairy or scaly. The leaves are linear to lance-shaped with the narrower end towards the base, mostly 15–35 mm (0.59–1.38 in) long and 1.2–4.5 mm (0.047–0.177 in) wide on a petiole up to 1.2 mm (0.047 in) long. The flowers are arranged singly on the ends of the main branches or on short side-shoots on a stout peduncle 4–8 mm (0.16–0.31 in) long, with egg-shaped to lance-shaped or oblong bracts 1.6–2.2 mm (0.063–0.087 in) long. The five sepals are joined at the base, the two outer sepal lobes 3.3–5.1 mm (0.13–0.20 in) long and the inner lobes 4.8–7.5 mm (0.19–0.30 in) long. The five petals are broadly egg-shaped with the narrower end towards the base, yellow, 7.4–15.7 mm (0.29–0.62 in) long with two lobes. There are thirty to forty-four stamens arranged in bundles around the two carpels, each carpel with four ovules. Flowering mainly occurs from December to June.

== Taxonomy ==
Hibbertia brevipedunculata was first formally described in 2010 by Hellmut R. Toelken in the Journal of the Adelaide Botanic Gardens from specimens collected by Norman Byrnes in the Adelaide River area in 1972. The specific epithet (brevipedunculata) means "short-pedunculate".

== Distribution and habitat ==
This hibbertia grows in woodland, often in soil derived from sandstone or granite, and occurs in north-western Western Australia and central northern Northern Territory. It is widespread in the Daly River region.

== Conservation status ==
Goodenia brevipedunculata is classified as "least concern" under the Northern Territory Government Territory Parks and Wildlife Conservation Act 1976.

== See also ==
- List of Hibbertia species
