= Hibbertia tricornis =

Scientific classification
- Kingdom: Plantae
- Clade: Tracheophytes
- Clade: Angiosperms
- Clade: Eudicots
- Order: Dilleniales
- Family: Dilleniaceae
- Genus: Hibbertia
- Species: H. tricornis

Binomial name
- Hibbertia tricornis Toelken

Species of flowering plant

Hibbertia tricornis is a species of flowering plant in the family Dilleniaceae and is only known from a three specimens collected in Arnhem Land in the Northern Territory. It is a small, more or less prostrate shrublet with a few delicate, wiry branches, elliptic leaves and yellow flowers arranged singly in leaf axils with 19 to 24 stamens arranged in groups around two densely scaly carpels.

== Description ==
Hibbertia tricornis is a more or less prostrate shrublet that typically grows to a height of up to 20 cm (7.9 in) and has a few delicate, wiry branches, and foliage covered with rosette-like hairs. The leaves are elliptic, mostly 5.5–15 mm (0.22–0.59 in) long and 5–10 mm (0.20–0.39 in) wide on a petiole 0.7–2.2 mm (0.028–0.087 in) long. The flowers are arranged singly in leaf axils on a thread-like peduncle 4.5–10 mm (0.18–0.39 in) long, with elliptic bracts 2.6–3.5 mm (0.10–0.14 in) long at the base. The five sepals are joined at the base, the two outer sepal lobes 3.5–3.8 mm (0.14–0.15 in) long and about 1 mm (0.039 in) wide, and the inner lobes about 2.5 mm (0.098 in) wide. The five petals are wedge-shaped, yellow, 7.6–8.9 mm (0.30–0.35 in) long with a deep notch at the tip and there are 19 to 24 stamens arranged around the two densely scaly carpels, each carpel with two ovules.

== Taxonomy ==
Hibbertia tricornis was first formally described in 2010 by Hellmut R. Toelken in the Journal of the Adelaide Botanic Gardens from a specimen collected by Clyde Robert Dunlop on Mount Brockman on the edge of the Arnhem Land escarpment in 1978. The specific epithet (tricornis) means "three-horned", referring to the bract and outer sepal lobes.

== Distribution ==
This hibbertia is only known from three specimens collected from the type location where they were growing between rocks in woodland.

== Conservation status ==
Hibbertia tricornis is classified as "vulnerable" under the Northern Territory Government Northern Territory Government Territory Parks and Wildlife Conservation Act 1976.

== See also ==
- List of Hibbertia species
