= Hibbertia oligocarpa =

Scientific classification
- Kingdom: Plantae
- Clade: Tracheophytes
- Clade: Angiosperms
- Clade: Eudicots
- Order: Dilleniales
- Family: Dilleniaceae
- Genus: Hibbertia
- Species: H. oligocarpa

Binomial name
- Hibbertia oligocarpa Toelken

Species of plant

Hibbertia oligocarpa is a species of flowering plant in the family Dilleniaceae and is only known from a single specimen collected near a waterfall near Gunbalanya in the Northern Territory. It is a shrublet with trailing stems, narrow elliptic leaves and yellow flowers with 46 to 58 stamens arranged in groups around four carpels.

== Description ==
Hibbertia oligocarpa is a shrublet has only a few trailing or scrambling stems. The foliage is covered with bundled, rosette-like hairs. The leaves are narrow elliptic, 6.5–13 mm (0.26–0.51 in) long and 2.5–3.5 mm (0.098–0.138 in) wide on a petiole 0.2–1.1 mm (0.0079–0.0433 in) long, with the edges curved downwards. The flowers are arranged singly, sometimes in clusters on short side shoots on a peduncle 6–10 mm (0.24–0.39 in) long, with linear bracts 1.5–2.2 mm (0.059–0.087 in) long at the base of the peduncle. The five sepals are joined at the base and densely scaly on the outside, the two outer sepal lobes 2.8–3.5 mm (0.11–0.14 in) long and the three inner lobes 4.3–4.9 mm (0.17–0.19 in) long. The five petals are yellow and egg-shaped with the narrower end towards the base, 5.2–7.6 mm (0.20–0.30 in) long. There are 46 to 58 stamens in bundles around four carpels, each with two ovules. Flowering has been observed in May.

== Taxonomy ==
Hibbertia oligocarpa was first formally described in 2010 by Hellmut R. Toelken in the Journal of the Adelaide Botanic Gardens from specimens collected near Gunbalanya (formerly known as Oenpelli) by Joseph Zvonko Weber in 1988. The specific epithet (oligocarpa) means "few-fruited".

== Distribution and habitat ==
This hibbertia is only known from the type collection that was growing over rocks near a waterfall near Gunbalanya in the Northern Territory.

== See also ==
- List of Hibbertia species
