= Hibbertia fractiflexa =

Scientific classification
- Kingdom: Plantae
- Clade: Tracheophytes
- Clade: Angiosperms
- Clade: Eudicots
- Order: Dilleniales
- Family: Dilleniaceae
- Genus: Hibbertia
- Species: H. fractiflexa

Binomial name
- Hibbertia fractiflexa Toelken

Species of plant

Hibbertia fractiflexa is a species of flowering plant in the family Dilleniaceae and is endemic to the Northern Territory. It is a small, multi-stemmed shrub with hairy foliage, elliptic leaves, and yellow flowers arranged in leaf axils with sixteen to twenty-two stamens arranged in groups around the two carpels.

== Description ==
Hibbertia fractiflexa is a multi-stemmed shrublet that typically grows to a height of 80 cm (31 in) with long, wiry, scrambling shoots. The leaves are elliptic, 10–40 mm (0.39–1.57 in) long and 2–10 mm (0.079–0.394 in) wide on a petiole 0.3–2.0 mm (0.012–0.079 in) long. The flowers are arranged singly, in pairs or three in leaf axils on a thread-like peduncle 8.6–23.7 mm (0.34–0.93 in) long, with triangular bracts 0.8–1.6 mm (0.031–0.063 in) long. The five sepals are joined at the base, the two outer sepal lobes 2.5–3.5 mm (0.098–0.138 in) long 1.8–2.1 mm (0.071–0.083 in) wide, and the inner lobes narrower. The five petals are wedge-shaped, yellow, 4.7–9.3 mm (0.19–0.37 in) long and there are sixteen to twenty-two stamens arranged in groups around the two carpels, each carpel with two ovules.

== Taxonomy ==
Hibbertia fractiflexa was first formally described in 2010 by Hellmut R. Toelken in the Journal of the Adelaide Botanic Gardens from specimens collected by Glenn Mitchell Wightman and Clyde Robert Dunlop near Waterfall Creek in 1984. The specific epithet (fractiflexa) means "zigzag" referring to the shape of the long shoots.

In the same journal, Toelken described four subspecies and the names are accepted by the Australian Plant Census:

- Hibbertia fractiflexa subsp. brachyblastis Toelken has leaves 3.5–6 mm (0.14–0.24 in) wide with sixteen to twenty scales across the middle part of the upper leaf surface, sixteen to twenty stamens and flowers from December to June;
- Hibbertia fractiflexa subsp. filicaulis Toelken has leaves 1.1–2.2 mm (0.043–0.087 in) wide and flowers from February to June;
- Hibbertia fractiflexa Toelken subsp. fractiflexa has leaves 3.5–6 mm (0.14–0.24 in) wide with twelve to sixteen scales across the middle part of the upper leaf surface and flowers from November to June;
- Hibbertia fractiflexa subsp. serotina Toelken is similar to subspecies brachyblastis but has twenty-four to twenty-six stamens and flowers in May.

== Distribution and habitat ==
This hibbertia grows in the northern part of the Northern Territory. Subspecies brachyblastis usually grows in rocky places in woodland in Kakadu National Park, subsp. filicaulis among boulders in scrub, woodland and forest on the western escarpment of the Arnhem Land Plateau, subsp. fractiflexa on rocky slopes and sandstone outcrops in woodland on the lower slopes of the western escarpment of the Arnhem Land Plateau and subsp. serotina on steep, rocky slopes in woodland in Litchfield National Park.

== Conservation status ==
Subspecies brachyblastis and fractiflexa are classified as of "least concern" and subspecies filicaulis and serotina as "data deficient" under the Territory Parks and Wildlife Conservation Act 1976.

== See also ==
- List of Hibbertia species
