= Hibbertia cactifolia =

Scientific classification
- Kingdom: Plantae
- Clade: Embryophytes
- Clade: Tracheophytes
- Clade: Spermatophytes
- Clade: Angiosperms
- Clade: Eudicots
- Order: Dilleniales
- Family: Dilleniaceae
- Genus: Hibbertia
- Species: H. cactifolia

Binomial name
- Hibbertia cactifolia Toelken

Species of flowering plant

Hibbertia cactifolia is a species of flowering plant in the family Dilleniaceae and is endemic to the Arnhem Land escarpment. It is a multi-stemmed shrublet with hairy foliage, oblong to elliptic leaves and yellow flowers arranged singly in leaf axils, with twenty-six to twenty-eight stamens arranged in groups around the two carpels.

== Description ==
Hibbertia cactifolia is a spreading to prostrate shrublet that typically grows to a height of up to 30 cm (12 in), its foliage more or less densely hairy. The leaves are oblong to elliptic, mostly 5.5–14 mm (0.22–0.55 in) long and 1–3 mm (0.039–0.118 in) wide on a petiole up to 0.5 mm (0.020 in) long. The flowers are arranged singly in leaf axils on a thread-like peduncle 7.2–15.6 mm (0.28–0.61 in) long, with lance-shaped bracts 3.4–4.5 mm (0.13–0.18 in) long. The five sepals are joined at the base, the two outer sepal lobes 3.9–4.6 mm (0.15–0.18 in) long and the inner lobes 3.3–4.2 mm (0.13–0.17 in) long. The five petals are egg-shaped to wedge-shaped with the narrower end towards the base, yellow, 4.4–5.2 mm (0.17–0.20 in) long with two lobes. There are twenty-six to twenty-eight stamens arranged in groups around the two carpels, each carpel with two ovules. Flowering occurs from December to June.

== Taxonomy ==
Hibbertia cactifolia was first formally described in 2010 by Hellmut R. Toelken in the Journal of the Adelaide Botanic Gardens from specimens collected by Lyndley Craven in Katherine Gorge in 1981. The specific epithet (cactifolia) means "cactus-leaved", referring to the hairs on the leaves, appearing like cactus leaves under the microscope.

== Distribution and habitat ==
This hibbertia grows in sandy soil in open forest in the south-western part of the Arnhem Land escarpment in the Northern Territory.

== Conservation status ==
Goodenia cactifolia is classified as "least concern" under the Northern Territory Government Territory Parks and Wildlife Conservation Act 1976.

== See also ==
- List of Hibbertia species
