= Hibbertia oxycraspedota =

Scientific classification
- Kingdom: Plantae
- Clade: Tracheophytes
- Clade: Angiosperms
- Clade: Eudicots
- Order: Dilleniales
- Family: Dilleniaceae
- Genus: Hibbertia
- Species: H. oxycraspedota

Binomial name
- Hibbertia oxycraspedota Toelken & R.T.Mill.

Species of plant

Hibbertia oxycraspedota is a species of flowering plant in the family Dilleniaceae and is endemic to New South Wales. It is a small shrub with linear to lance-shaped leaves and yellow flowers arranged singly on the ends of branchlets, with usually seven stamens in a single cluster on one side of two carpels.

== Description ==
Hibbertia oxycraspedota is a shrub that typically grows to a height of up to 40 cm (16 in) and has moderately hairy young foliage. The leaves are linear to lance-shaped, 5.4–6.5 mm (0.21–0.26 in) long and 0.5–0.8 mm (0.020–0.031 in) wide on a petiole 0.2–0.5 mm (0.0079–0.0197 in) long. The flowers are arranged singly on the ends of branchlets and short side shoots and sessile with a few linear bracts 2.8–3.4 mm (0.11–0.13 in) long at the base. The five sepals are joined at the base, the outer sepal lobes 1.5–1.8 mm (0.059–0.071 in) wide and the inner lobes 2.3–2.8 mm (0.091–0.110 in) wide. The five petals are broadly egg-shaped with the narrower end towards the base, yellow, 5.2–6.3 mm (0.20–0.25 in) long and there are usually seven stamens arranged in a bundle on one side of the two carpels, each carpel with four ovules. Flowering mainly occurs from August to October.

== Taxonomy ==
Hibbertia oxycraspedota was first formally described in 2012 by Hellmut R. Toelken and R.T. Miller in the Journal of the Adelaide Botanic Gardens from specimens collected in 2005 in Heathcote National Park. The specific epithet (oxycraspedota) means "sharp-edged", referring to the leaves.

== Distribution and habitat ==
This hibbertia grows in sandy soil on sandstone, often in moist places on the Central Coast of New South Wales.

== See also ==
- List of Hibbertia species
