= Hibbertia caudice =

Scientific classification
- Kingdom: Plantae
- Clade: Tracheophytes
- Clade: Angiosperms
- Clade: Eudicots
- Order: Dilleniales
- Family: Dilleniaceae
- Genus: Hibbertia
- Species: H. caudice

Binomial name
- Hibbertia caudice Toelken

Species of flowering plant

Hibbertia caudice is a species of flowering plant in the family Dilleniaceae and is endemic to northern Australia. It is a shrub with wiry stems, hairy foliage, elliptic to lance-shaped leaves with the narrower end towards the base, and yellow flowers arranged in leaf axils, mostly with twenty-four to twenty-six stamens arranged in groups around the two carpels.

== Description ==
Hibbertia caudice is a shrub that typically grows to a height of up to 40 cm (16 in) but sometimes to 1 m (3 ft 3 in), its stems wiry and the foliage covered with rosette-like hairs or shield-like scales. The leaves are elliptic to lance-shaped with the narrower end towards the base, 8.2–76.2 mm (0.32–3.00 in) long and 2.1–25.6 mm (0.083–1.008 in) wide on a petiole 0.3–1.5 mm (0.012–0.059 in) long. The flowers are arranged singly or in pairs in leaf axils on a thread-like peduncle 10–18 mm (0.39–0.71 in) long, with broadly egg-shaped bracts 1.2–1.6 mm (0.047–0.063 in) long. The five sepals are joined at the base, the two outer sepal lobes 2.8–4.2 mm (0.11–0.17 in) long and the inner lobes 4.8–5.5 mm (0.19–0.22 in) long. The five petals are broadly egg-shaped with the narrower end towards the base, yellow, 9–12.5 mm (0.35–0.49 in) long with a deep notch at the tip. There are twenty-four to twenty-six stamens arranged in groups around the two carpels, each carpel with two ovules. Flowering mainly occurs from March to November.

== Taxonomy ==
Hibbertia caudice was first formally described in 2010 by Hellmut R. Toelken in the Journal of the Adelaide Botanic Gardens from specimens collected by Glen Wightmann in Nhulunbuy in 1988. The specific epithet (caudice) means "with rootstock".

== Distribution and habitat ==
This hibbertia grows in woodland, often above creek banks and is widespread and common in the north of the Northern Territory, including on Bathurst and Melville Islands, and on Cape York Peninsula in Queensland.

== Conservation status ==
Goodenia caudice is classified as of "least concern" under the Northern Territory Government Territory Parks and Wildlife Conservation Act 1976 and the Queensland Government Nature Conservation Act 1992.

== See also ==
- List of Hibbertia species
