= Hibbertia angulata =

Scientific classification
- Kingdom: Plantae
- Clade: Tracheophytes
- Clade: Angiosperms
- Clade: Eudicots
- Order: Dilleniales
- Family: Dilleniaceae
- Genus: Hibbertia
- Species: H. angulata

Binomial name
- Hibbertia angulata Toelken

Species of plant

Hibbertia angulata is a species of flowering plant in the family Dilleniaceae and is endemic to a restricted area in the Northern Territory. It is an erect sub-shrub with sessile, linear leaves and yellow flowers arranged singly in leaf axils, with seventeen to nineteen stamens arranged in bundles around the three carpels.

== Description ==
Hibbertia angulata is an erect sub-shrub that typically grows to a height of up to 20 cm (7.9 in), its stems covered with star-shaped hairs. The leaves are sessile, linear with the edges rolled under, 8–35 mm (0.31–1.38 in) long and 0.8–2 mm (0.031–0.079 in) wide. The flowers are arranged singly in leaf axils at the ends of branchlets on a peduncle 3.5–14 mm (0.14–0.55 in) long, with almost cylindrical bracts 4–6 mm (0.16–0.24 in) long. The five sepals are joined at the base, the two outer sepal lobes 4.4–5.3 mm (0.17–0.21 in) long and the inner lobes 4.1–4.7 mm (0.16–0.19 in) long. The five petals are egg-shaped with the narrower end towards the base, yellow, 4–5.2 mm (0.16–0.20 in) long and there are seventeen to nineteen stamens arranged in five bundles around the three carpels, each carpel with two ovules. Flowering occurs from November to December.

== Taxonomy ==
Hibbertia angulata was first formally described in 2010 by Hellmut R. Toelken in the Journal of the Adelaide Botanic Gardens from specimens collected by Paul Irwin Forster near Berry Springs, Northern Territory in 1989. The specific epithet (angulata) means "angled", referring to the shape of the flower buds.

== Distribution and habitat ==
This hibbertia grows in forest and woodland on the Cox Peninsula west of Darwin in the Northern Territory.

== Conservation status ==
Goodenia angulata is classified as "near threatened" under the Northern Territory Government Territory Parks and Wildlife Conservation Act 1976.

== See also ==
- List of Hibbertia species
