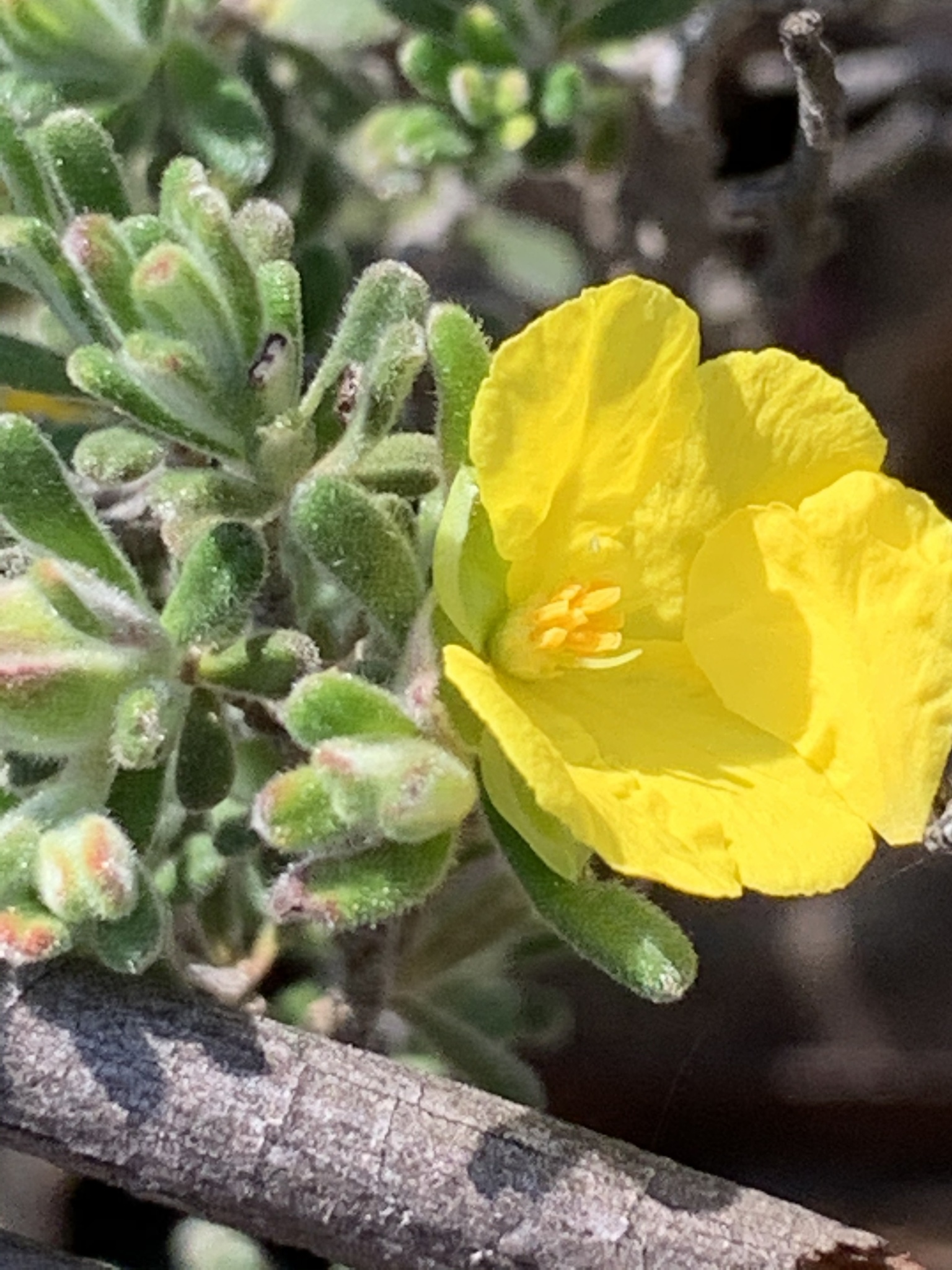

Scientific classification
- Kingdom: Plantae
- Clade: Tracheophytes
- Clade: Angiosperms
- Clade: Eudicots
- Order: Dilleniales
- Family: Dilleniaceae
- Genus: Hibbertia
- Species: H. horricomis

Binomial name
- Hibbertia horricomis Toelken

= Hibbertia horricomis =

Flower

Hibbertia horricomis is a species of flowering plant in the family Dilleniaceae and is endemic to a restricted area of New South Wales. It is a small, erect to spreading shrub with hairy foliage, linear to elliptic leaves, and yellow flowers with about twenty stamens arranged around the two hairy carpels.

== Description ==
Hibbertia horricomis is an erect to spreading shrub that typically grows to a height of up to 30 cm (12 in) with hairy foliage. The leaves are linear to elliptic, 3–7 mm (0.12–0.28 in) long and about 1 mm (0.039 in) wide with a pimply upper surface. The flowers are arranged singly on the ends of the branchlets and are sessile. The five sepals are joined at the base, the two outer sepal lobes egg-shaped, 6.8–7.3 mm (0.27–0.29 in) long and the inner lobes slightly shorter. The five petals are egg-shaped with the narrower end towards the base, yellow, 7.5–9.5 mm (0.30–0.37 in) long. There are twenty to twenty-four stamens arranged around two hairy carpels, each carpel with four ovules.

== Taxonomy ==
Hibbertia horricomis was first formally described in 2013 by Hellmut R. Toelken in the Journal of the Adelaide Botanic Gardens from specimens collected in Deua National Park in 1984. The specific epithet (horricomis) means "bristly", referring to the stiff spreading hairs on the leaves and branches.

== Distribution and habitat ==
This hibbertia grows in open forest on ridges and steep slopes in Deua National Park on the Southern Tablelands of New South Wales.

== See also ==
- List of Hibbertia species
