= Hibbertia eciliata =

Scientific classification
- Kingdom: Plantae
- Clade: Tracheophytes
- Clade: Angiosperms
- Clade: Eudicots
- Order: Dilleniales
- Family: Dilleniaceae
- Genus: Hibbertia
- Species: H. eciliata

Binomial name
- Hibbertia eciliata Toelken

Species of plant

Hibbertia eciliata is a species of flowering plant in the family Dilleniaceae and is endemic to a restricted area of Queensland. It is a sparsely-branched shrub with densely hairy foliage, elliptic and yellow flowers arranged singly on the ends of branchlets, with between fifty and fifty-four stamens arranged in groups around the two carpels.

== Description ==
Hibbertia eciliata is a sparsely-branched, densely hairy shrub that typically grows to a height of 50 cm (20 in). The leaves are elliptic, 8–18 mm (0.31–0.71 in) long and 3.5–5.7 mm (0.14–0.22 in) wide on a petiole 0.4–1.6 mm (0.016–0.063 in) long. The flowers are arranged singly on the ends of branchlets on a thick peduncle 4–6.5 mm (0.16–0.26 in) long, with linear to elliptic bracts 5.5–5.5 mm (0.22–0.22 in) long. The five sepals are joined at the base, the three outer sepal lobes about 8 mm (0.31 in) long and the inner lobes 6.4–6.8 mm (0.25–0.27 in) long. The five petals are broadly egg-shaped with the narrower end towards the base, yellow, 7.2–9.8 mm (0.28–0.39 in) long with a deep notch at the tip. There are fifty to fifty-four stamens and a few staminodes arranged in groups around the two carpels, each carpel with two ovules. Flowering has been observed in May.

== Taxonomy ==
Hibbertia eciliata was first formally described in 2010 by Hellmut R. Toelken in the Journal of the Adelaide Botanic Gardens from specimens collected near Cape Flattery in 1990. The specific epithet (eciliata) means "without cilia".

== Distribution and habitat ==
This hibbertia grows on undulating sand dunes and is only known from the type location.

== Conservation status ==
Goodenia eciliata is classified as of "least concern" under the Queensland Government Nature Conservation Act 1992.

== See also ==
- List of Hibbertia species
