= Hibbertia porcata =

Scientific classification
- Kingdom: Plantae
- Clade: Tracheophytes
- Clade: Angiosperms
- Clade: Eudicots
- Order: Dilleniales
- Family: Dilleniaceae
- Genus: Hibbertia
- Species: H. porcata

Binomial name
- Hibbertia porcata Toelken

Species of plant

Hibbertia porcata is a species of flowering plant in the family Dilleniaceae and is endemic to south-eastern continental Australia. It is a small, low-lying to prostrate shrub with linear leaves and yellow flowers with fifteen to twenty-five stamens arranged around three hairy carpels.

== Description ==
Hibbertia porcata is a low-lying to prostrate shrub that typically grows to a height of 25–45 cm (9.8–17.7 in) with branches up to 50 cm (20 in) long. The leaves are linear, mostly 4–6 mm (0.16–0.24 in) long and 0.5–0.8 mm (0.020–0.031 in) wide on a petiole 0.3–1.2 mm (0.012–0.047 in) long. The leaves are sparsely hairy on the upper surface, the lower surface is glabrous and the edges are rolled under. The flowers are arranged singly on the ends of the branches on a peduncle 4–10 mm (0.16–0.39 in) long. There are linear bracts mostly 4–6 mm (0.16–0.24 in) long and the five sepals are 5.5–7 mm (0.22–0.28 in) and joined at the base with lobes of varying dimensions. The five petals are broadly egg-shaped with the narrower end towards the base, yellow, about 11 mm (0.43 in) long with fifteen to twenty-five stamens and sometimes a few staminodes arranged around the three hairy carpels, each carpel with four to six ovules.

== Taxonomy ==
Hibbertia porcata was first formally described in 2013 by Hellmut R. Toelken in the Journal of the Adelaide Botanic Gardens from specimens collected by Erwin Gauba near Lake George in 1949. The specific epithet (porcata) means "ridged", referring to the tip of the sepal lobes.

== Distribution and habitat ==
This hibbertia is only known from a few specimens collected in eucalypt woodland on the Central and Southern Tablelands and South West Slopes of New South Wales, and a single record from near Christmas Hills in Victoria.

== See also ==
- List of Hibbertia species
