= Hibbertia malacophylla =

Scientific classification
- Kingdom: Plantae
- Clade: Tracheophytes
- Clade: Angiosperms
- Clade: Eudicots
- Order: Dilleniales
- Family: Dilleniaceae
- Genus: Hibbertia
- Species: H. malacophylla

Binomial name
- Hibbertia malacophylla Toelken

Species of plant

Hibbertia malacophylla is a species of flowering plant in the family Dilleniaceae and is endemic to Queensland. It is a spreading shrub with densely hairy foliage, elliptic leaves, and single yellow flowers arranged in leaf axils with 50 to 55 stamens arranged around the two carpels.

== Description ==
Hibbertia malacophylla is a densely hairy shrub with spreading branches and that typically grows up to 0.8 m (2 ft 7 in) high and 1.5 m (4 ft 11 in) wide. The leaves are elliptic to lance-shaped with the narrower end towards the base, 20–35 mm (0.79–1.38 in) long and 8–15 mm (0.31–0.59 in) wide on a petiole 1.5–3.0 mm (0.059–0.118 in) long. The flowers are arranged singly in leaf axils on a stiff peduncle 5.8–14.2 mm (0.23–0.56 in) long, with linear to lance-shaped bracts 3.2–5.6 mm (0.13–0.22 in) long. The five sepals are joined at the base, the three outer sepal lobes 8.2–8.9 mm (0.32–0.35 in) long and the inner lobes 7.3–8.4 mm (0.29–0.33 in) long. The five petals are broadly egg-shaped with the narrower end towards the base, yellow, 6.4–10.1 mm (0.25–0.40 in) long and there are 50 to 55 stamens and up to twelve staminodes arranged around the two carpels, each carpel with three or four ovules. Flowering occurs from February to August.

== Taxonomy ==
Hibbertia malacophylla was first formally described in 2010 by Hellmut R. Toelken in the Journal of the Adelaide Botanic Gardens from specimens collected near Port Curtis in 1977. The specific epithet (malacophylla) means "soft-leaved", referring to densely silky-hairy leaves.

== Distribution and habitat ==
This hibbertia grows on granite outcrops in forest on the Many Peaks Range near Gladstone.

== Conservation status ==
Hibbertia malacophylla is classified as "least concern" under the Queensland Government Nature Conservation Act 1992.

== See also ==
- List of Hibbertia species
