= Hibbertia axillaris =

Scientific classification
- Kingdom: Plantae
- Clade: Tracheophytes
- Clade: Angiosperms
- Clade: Eudicots
- Order: Dilleniales
- Family: Dilleniaceae
- Genus: Hibbertia
- Species: H. axillaris

Binomial name
- Hibbertia axillaris Toelken

Species of flowering plant

Hibbertia axillaris is a species of flowering plant in the family Dilleniaceae and is endemic to northern Western Australia. It is usually a multi-stemmed shrublet with ridged branchlets, foliage covered with scales and rosette-like hairs and mostly elliptic to lance-shaped leaves. The flowers are arranged singly in leaf axils, with forty-two to fifty stamens arranged around the three carpels.

== Description ==
Hibbertia axillaris is usually a multi-stemmed shrublet with ridged branchlets, that typically grows to a height of up to 30 cm (12 in). Its foliage is more or less densely covered with rosette-like hairs and scales. The leaves are mostly elliptic to lance-shaped with the narrower end towards the base, 25–40 mm (0.98–1.57 in) long and 6–9 mm (0.24–0.35 in) wide on a petiole 1.6–3.2 mm (0.063–0.126 in) long. The flowers are arranged singly in leaf axils on a thin peduncle 7.5–10 mm (0.30–0.39 in) long, with linear bracts about 2 mm (0.079 in) long. The five sepals are joined at the base, the two outer sepal lobes 3.2–4.1 mm (0.13–0.16 in) long and the inner lobes 42–4.6 mm (1.65–0.18 in) long. The five petals are broadly egg-shaped with the narrower end towards the base, 8.3–9.6 mm (0.33–0.38 in) long with two lobes. There are forty-two to fifty stamens arranged in groups around the two densely scaly carpels, each carpel with three or four ovules. Flowering occurs around June.

== Taxonomy ==
Hibbertia axillaris was first formally described in 2010 by Hellmut R. Toelken in the Journal of the Adelaide Botanic Gardens from specimens collected near Mitchell Falls in 1985. The specific epithet (axillaris) means "axillary", referring to the flowers.

== Distribution and habitat ==
This hibbertia is only known from the type specimen that was growing in sandy soil near a stream in woodland in the Kimberley region in northern Western Australia .

== See also ==
- List of Hibbertia species
