= Hibbertia scabrifolia =

Scientific classification
- Kingdom: Plantae
- Clade: Tracheophytes
- Clade: Angiosperms
- Clade: Eudicots
- Order: Dilleniales
- Family: Dilleniaceae
- Genus: Hibbertia
- Species: H. scabrifolia

Binomial name
- Hibbertia scabrifolia Toelken

Species of flowering plant

Hibbertia scabrifolia is a species of flowering plant in the family Dilleniaceae and is endemic to the Northern Kimberley region of Western Australia. It is a shrub with low-lying branches, linear leaves and yellow flowers usually arranged singly near the ends of branches, usually with 20 to 22 stamens arranged in bundles around two densely scaly carpels.

== Description ==
Hibbertia scabrifolia is a shrub that typically grows to a height of up to 60 cm (24 in) and has many low-lying branches, the foliage covered with rosette-like hairs. The leaves are linear, mostly 6–13 mm (0.24–0.51 in) long and 1.1–2.0 mm (0.043–0.079 in) wide on a petiole up to 0.8 mm (0.031 in) long. The lower surface of the leaves is densely hairy. The flowers are arranged singly on the ends of branches, each flower on a thread-like peduncle 6.5–14.7 mm (0.26–0.58 in) long, with egg-shaped bracts at the base. The five sepals are joined at the base, the two outer sepal lobes 2.3–2.8 mm (0.091–0.110 in) long and 2.4–2.8 mm (0.094–0.110 in) wide, and the inner lobes longer and broader. The five petals are narrow wedge-shaped with the narrower end towards the base, yellow, 2.5–3.3 mm (0.098–0.130 in) long and there are 20 to 22 stamens arranged in bundles around the two densely scaly carpels, each carpel with two ovules.

== Taxonomy ==
Hibbertia scabrifolia was first formally described in 2010 by Hellmut R. Toelken in the Journal of the Adelaide Botanic Gardens from specimens collected on Theda Station in 1985. The specific epithet (scabrifolia) means "rough-leaved".

== Distribution and habitat ==
This hibbertia grows eucalypt woodland in the Northern Kimberley region of northern Western Australia.

== Conservation status ==
Hibbertia scabrifolia is classified as "not threatened" by the Government of Western Australia Department of Parks and Wildlife.

== See also ==
- List of Hibbertia species
