= Hibbertia argyrochiton =

Scientific classification
- Kingdom: Plantae
- Clade: Tracheophytes
- Clade: Angiosperms
- Clade: Eudicots
- Order: Dilleniales
- Family: Dilleniaceae
- Genus: Hibbertia
- Species: H. argyrochiton

Binomial name
- Hibbertia argyrochiton Toelken

Species of flowering plant

Hibbertia argyrochiton is a species of flowering plant in the family Dilleniaceae and is endemic to northern parts of the Northern Territory. It is a shrub densely covered with scales and has elliptic to lance-shaped leaves, and yellow flowers usually arranged singly in leaf axils, with twenty to twenty-four stamens arranged in groups around the two carpels.

== Description ==
Hibbertia argyrochiton is a shrub that typically grows to a height of up to 40 cm (16 in), its foliage densely covered with often overlapping scales. The leaves are elliptic to lance-shaped, 8.5–20 mm (0.33–0.79 in) long and 4.5–8 mm (0.18–0.31 in) wide on a petiole up to 1.5 mm (0.059 in) long. The flowers are usually arranged singly in leaf axils, sometimes in pairs on short side shoots on a strap-like peduncle 6–9 mm (0.24–0.35 in) long, with lance-shaped bracts 1.5–3 mm (0.059–0.118 in) long. The five sepals are joined at the base, the two outer sepal lobes 3.5–4 mm (0.14–0.16 in) long and the inner lobes slightly shorter. The five petals are egg-shaped to wedge-shaped with the narrower end towards the base, yellow, 4.5–6 mm (0.18–0.24 in) long and deeply lobed. There are twenty to twenty-four stamens arranged in groups around the two carpels, each carpel with two ovules. Flowering mainly occurs from February to June.

== Taxonomy ==
Hibbertia argyrochiton was first formally described in 2010 by Hellmut R. Toelken in the Journal of the Adelaide Botanic Gardens from specimens collected by Lyndley Craven on the Arnhem Plateau in 1973. The specific epithet (argyrochiton) is derived from Greek and means "a silvery coat of armour", referring to the scales on the foliage.

== Distribution and habitat ==
This hibbertia grows in shallow sand in rock crevices in woodland in the northern parts of the Northern Territory.

== Conservation status ==
Goodenia argyrochiton is classified as of "least concern" under the Northern Territory Government Territory Parks and Wildlife Conservation Act 1976 and is locally frequent in Kakadu National Park.

== See also ==
- List of Hibbertia species
