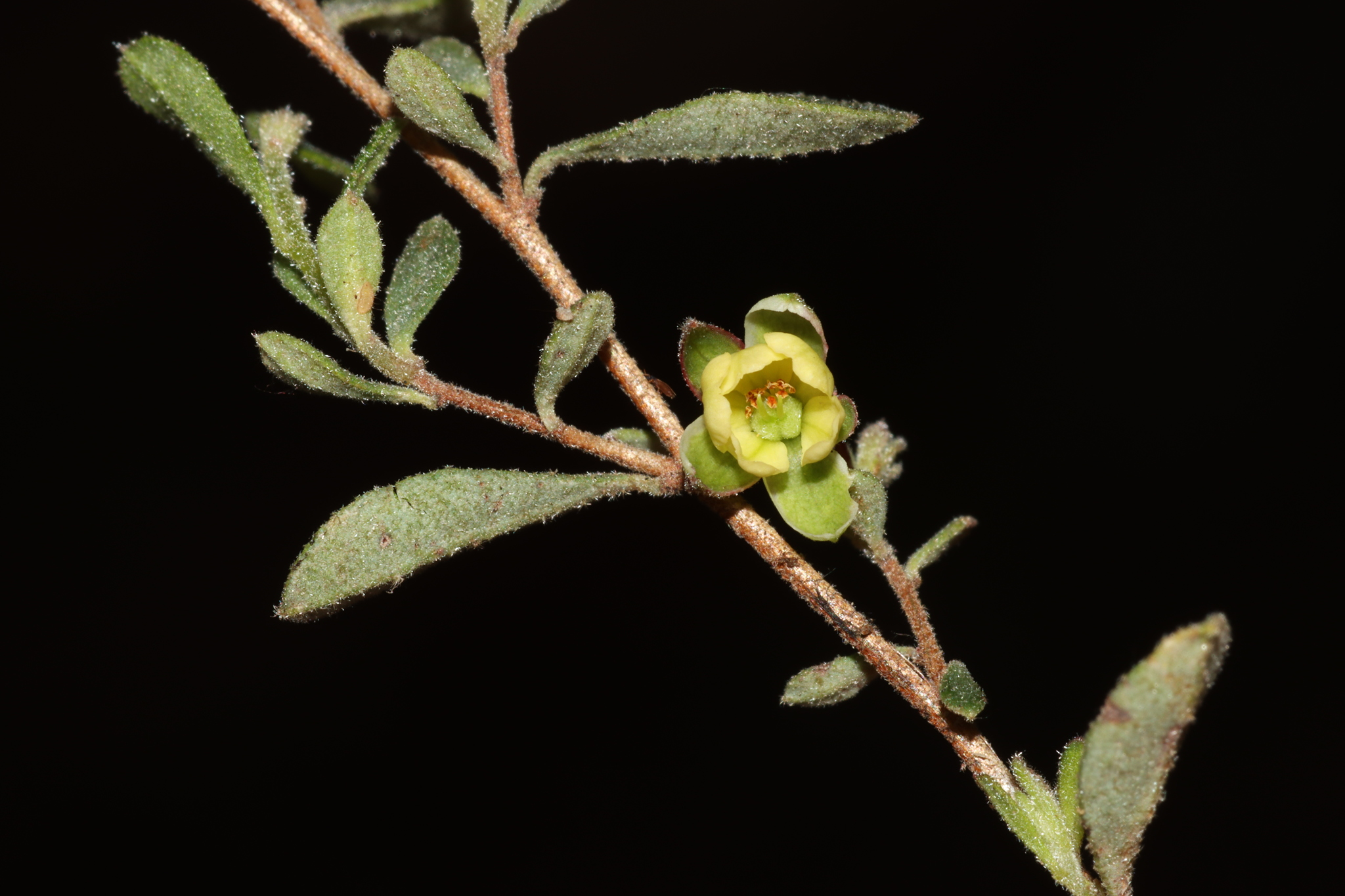

Scientific classification
- Kingdom: Plantae
- Clade: Tracheophytes
- Clade: Angiosperms
- Clade: Eudicots
- Order: Dilleniales
- Family: Dilleniaceae
- Genus: Hibbertia
- Species: H. pallidiflora

Binomial name
- Hibbertia pallidiflora Toelken

= Hibbertia pallidiflora =

Species of flowering plant

Hibbertia pallidiflora is a species of flowering plant in the family Dilleniaceae and is endemic to south-eastern continental Australia. It is usually a small, dense shrub with hairy branches, egg-shaped to lance-shaped leaves with the narrower end towards the base, and cream-coloured to pale yellow flowers with eight to thirteen stamens joined at the base on one side of two carpels.

== Description ==
Hibbertia pallidiflora is usually a dense shrub that typically grows to a height of up to 1.5 m (4 ft 11 in) and has hairy, scrambling branches. The leaves are egg-shaped to lance-shaped with the narrower end towards the base, 2.3–10.4 mm (0.091–0.409 in) long, 0.9–6.5 mm (0.035–0.256 in) wide on a petiole 0.2–0.9 mm (0.0079–0.0354 in) long, and with the edges more or less turned down. The flowers are arranged singly on the ends of side shoots on a peduncle 2–9.5 mm (0.079–0.374 in) long with a single linear to lance-shaped bract 1.2–2.2 mm (0.047–0.087 in) long at the base. The five sepal are joined at the base, the lobes 2.1–3.9 mm (0.083–0.154 in) wide, the inner lobes slightly shorter than the outer ones. The petals are cream-coloured to pale yellow, egg-shaped with the narrower end towards the base, 1.3–2.5 mm (0.051–0.098 in) long with eight to thirteen stamens joined at the base, on one side of the two carpels, each carpel usually with two ovules. Flowering mostly occurs from August to November.

== Taxonomy ==
Hibbertia pallidiflora was first formally described in 1995 by Hellmut R. Toelken in the Journal of the Adelaide Botanic Gardens from specimens he collected near on the southern Yorke Peninsula in 1994.

== Distribution and habitat ==
This hibbertia grows in temporarily flooded areas and in scrub vegetation near the coast and occurs in south-eastern South Australia, including the Yorke and Fleurieu Peninsulas and Kangaroo Island. It is sometimes recorded in south-western Victoria.

== See also ==
- List of Hibbertia species
