= Hibbertia echiifolia =

Scientific classification
- Kingdom: Plantae
- Clade: Tracheophytes
- Clade: Angiosperms
- Clade: Eudicots
- Order: Dilleniales
- Family: Dilleniaceae
- Genus: Hibbertia
- Species: H. echiifolia

Binomial name
- Hibbertia echiifolia R.Br. ex Benth.

Species of plant

Hibbertia echiifolia is a species of flowering plant in the family Dilleniaceae and is endemic to northern Australia. It is a variable shrub with elliptic to lance-shaped or oblong leaves and yellow flowers arranged singly in leaf axils, with twenty-nine to forty-five stamens arranged around the three carpels.

== Description ==
Hibbertia echiifolia is a sometimes spreading shrub that typically grows to a height of 0.2–3.5 m (7.9 in – 11 ft 5.8 in), its branches covered with scale-like hairs. The leaves are elliptic to lance-shaped or oblong, 5–73 mm (0.20–2.87 in) long and 1–17 mm (0.039–0.669 in) wide and sessile or on a petiole up to 1 mm (0.039 in) long. The flowers are arranged singly in up to three leaf axils at the ends of branchlets and sessile or on a thick peduncle up to 23 mm (0.91 in) long, with lance-shaped bracts 3.5–11 mm (0.14–0.43 in) long. The five sepals are joined at the base, the two outer sepal lobes 3–14 mm (0.12–0.55 in) long and the inner lobes longer. The five petals are egg-shaped with the narrower end towards the base, yellow, 7–17 mm (0.28–0.67 in) long with two lobes on the end. There are twenty-nine to forty-five stamens of differing lengths arranged in groups around the three carpels, each carpel with two ovules. Flowering occurs from April to July.

== Taxonomy and naming ==
Hibbertia echiifolia was first formally described in 1863 by George Bentham in Flora Australiensis from an unpublished description by Robert Brown. The specific epithet (echiifolia) means "leaves similar to those of plants in the genus Echium".

In 2010, Hellmut Toelken described five subspecies and the names are accepted by the Australian Plant Census:

- Hibbertia echiifolia subsp. cernua Toelken has more or less glabrous branches, more or less sessile flowers and sepal lobes 6–8 mm (0.24–0.31 in) long;
- Hibbertia echiifolia R.Br. ex Benth. subsp. echiifolia has branches covered with scale-like hairs, flowers on thick peduncles and inner and outer sepal lobes 6–8 mm (0.24–0.31 in) long and more or less equal in length;
- Hibbertia echiifolia subsp. macrantha Toelken has sepal lobes 9–14 mm (0.35–0.55 in) long and longer than those of the other subspecies;
- Hibbertia echiifolia subsp. oligantha Toelken is similar to subsp. echiifolia but with the outer sepal lobes distinctly shorter than the inner ones;
- Hibbertia echiifolia subsp. rotata Toelken leaves without scale-like hairs and has sepal lobes 6–8 mm (0.24–0.31 in) long.

The subspecies' names (other than that of the autonym echiifolia) mean "drooping" (cernua), "large-flowered" (macrantha), "few-flowered" (oligantha) and "wheeled" (oligantha), the last referring to the wheel-like appearance of the hairs.

== Distribution and habitat ==
This variable hibbertia occurs in the Kimberley region of Western Australia, the northern part of the Northern Territory on the Cape York Peninsula in Queensland. Subspecies cernua grows in scrub in Arnhem Land in the Northern Territory, subspecies echiifolia in heath in coastal areas of the northern Kimberley, north-eastern Northern Territory and Cape York Peninsula, macrantha in woodland, mainly in Arnhem Land, oligantha in rocky places in woodland in Arnhem Land and subspecies rotata in woodland on sandstones or scree slopes in Arnhem Land.

== Conservation status ==
Goodenia echiifolia is classified as of "least concern" under the Northern Territory Government Territory Parks and Wildlife Conservation Act 1976 and as "not threatened" by the Western Australian Government Department of Parks and Wildlife.

== See also ==
- List of Hibbertia species
