= Hibbertia incurvata =

Scientific classification
- Kingdom: Plantae
- Clade: Tracheophytes
- Clade: Angiosperms
- Clade: Eudicots
- Order: Dilleniales
- Family: Dilleniaceae
- Genus: Hibbertia
- Species: H. incurvata

Binomial name
- Hibbertia incurvata Toelken

Species of plant

Hibbertia incurvata is a species of flowering plant in the family Dilleniaceae and is endemic to the Northern Territory. It is a spreading, woody shrub with scaly foliage, elliptic to lance-shaped leaves, and yellow flowers arranged in leaf axils with 28 to 35 stamens arranged in bundles around the two carpels.

== Description ==
Hibbertia incurvata is a spreading shrub that typically grows to a height of up to 1.5 m (4 ft 11 in) and has stiff, woody branches. The leaves are elliptic to lance-shaped with the narrower end towards the base, 5.5–12 mm (0.22–0.47 in) long and 2.5–4 mm (0.098–0.157 in) wide and sessile or on a petiole up to 1.6 mm (0.063 in) long. The flowers are arranged singly near the ends of shoots on a stiff peduncle 5–9 mm (0.20–0.35 in) long, with lance-shaped bracts 2.8–4.6 mm (0.11–0.18 in) long. The five sepals are joined at the base, the two outer sepal lobes lance-shaped 2.8–3.4 mm (0.11–0.13 in) long and the inner lobes egg-shaped and slightly wider. The five petals are egg-shaped with the narrower end towards the base, yellow, 8.4–12.2 mm (0.33–0.48 in) long and there are 28 to 35 stamens arranged in groups around the two carpels, each carpel with two ovules.

== Taxonomy ==
Hibbertia incurvata was first formally described in 2010 by Hellmut R. Toelken in the Journal of the Adelaide Botanic Gardens from specimens collected near Maningrida in 2000. The specific epithet (incurvata) refers to the shape of the leaves.

== Distribution and habitat ==
This hibbertia grows on or near sandstone outcrops and in open woodland in northern Arnhem Land.

== Conservation status ==
Hibbertia incurvata is classified as "data deficient" under the Territory Parks and Wildlife Conservation Act 1976.

== See also ==
- List of Hibbertia species
