= Hibbertia singularis =

Scientific classification
- Kingdom: Plantae
- Clade: Tracheophytes
- Clade: Angiosperms
- Clade: Eudicots
- Order: Dilleniales
- Family: Dilleniaceae
- Genus: Hibbertia
- Species: H. singularis

Binomial name
- Hibbertia singularis Hellmut R. Toelken

Species of flowering plant

Hibbertia singularis is a species of flowering plant in the family Dilleniaceae and is endemic to New South Wales. It is a small, low-lying shrub with many stems, oblong leaves and single yellow flowers on the ends of main branches, with 22 to 25 stamens around three carpels.

== Description ==
Hibbertia singularis is a low-lying shrub with many stems and that typically grows to a height of 15 cm (5.9 in) with foliage that is hairy at first, quickly becoming glabrous. The leaves are oblong, mostly 2.0–3.5 mm (0.079–0.138 in) long and 0.7–1 mm (0.028–0.039 in) wide on a petiole 0.2–0.4 mm (0.0079–0.0157 in) long and with the edges rolled under. The flowers are arranged on the ends of main branches on a peduncle 10.5–16 mm (0.41–0.63 in) long with bracts 2.5–2.8 mm (0.098–0.110 in) long. The sepals are joined at the base, the outer lobes 6.0–7.5 mm (0.24–0.30 in) long, 3.0–4.2 mm (0.12–0.17 in) wide, the inner lobes broader. The petals are yellow, egg-shaped with the narrower end towards the base, and up to 9.8 mm (0.39 in) long with 22 to 25 stamens arranged around three carpels, each carpel with four ovules. Flowering has been observed in January.

== Taxonomy ==
Hibbertia singularis was first formally described in 2013 by Hellmut R. Toelken in the Journal of the Adelaide Botanic Gardens from specimens collected by James Hamlyn Willis at "Kydra Peaks" (near Cooma). The specific epithet (singularis) means "alone of its kind", referring to the species being very different from its closest relative.

== Distribution ==
This hibbertia is only known from the area around Kydra Peaks on the Southern Tablelands of New South Wales.
