= Hibbertia demissa =

Scientific classification
- Kingdom: Plantae
- Clade: Tracheophytes
- Clade: Angiosperms
- Clade: Eudicots
- Order: Dilleniales
- Family: Dilleniaceae
- Genus: Hibbertia
- Species: H. demissa

Binomial name
- Hibbertia demissa Toelken

Species of plant

Hibbertia demissa is a species of flowering plant in the family Dilleniaceae and is endemic to a restricted area of New South Wales. It is a low-lying shrublet with small elliptic leaves and single yellow flowers arranged on the ends of branchlets, with nine to twelve stamens arranged around three carpels.

== Description ==
Hibbertia demissa is a shrublet that typically grows up to 15 cm (5.9 in) high with wiry, low-lying branches. The leaves are oblong to elliptic, 1.4–1.8 mm (0.055–0.071 in) long and 1.4–1.7 mm (0.055–0.067 in) wide on a petiole up to 0.4 mm (0.016 in) long. The flowers are sessile, arranged singly on the ends of branches with lance-shaped bracts about 5.4 mm (0.21 in) long. The five sepals are joined at the base, the two outer sepal lobes 4.5–5.6 mm (0.18–0.22 in) long and the inner lobes 5.6–6 mm (0.22–0.24 in) long. The five petals are broadly egg-shaped with the narrower end towards the base, yellow and about 7 mm (0.28 in) long. There are nine to twelve stamens arranged around the three hairy carpels, each carpel with four ovules. Flowering has been observed in October.

== Taxonomy ==
Hibbertia demissa was first formally described in 2013 by Hellmut R. Toelken in the Journal of the Adelaide Botanic Gardens from specimens collected "near the top of the range near Backwater" in 1929. The specific epithet (demissa) means "low and humble", referring to the habit of this species.

== Distribution and habitat ==
This hibbertia grows in sandy soil over granite in forest on the Northern Tablelands of New South Wales.

== See also ==
- List of Hibbertia species
