= Hibbertia nemorosa =

Scientific classification
- Kingdom: Plantae
- Clade: Tracheophytes
- Clade: Angiosperms
- Clade: Eudicots
- Order: Dilleniales
- Family: Dilleniaceae
- Genus: Hibbertia
- Species: H. nemorosa

Binomial name
- Hibbertia nemorosa Toelken

Synonyms
- Hibbertia heterotricha Toelken nom. illeg.; Hibbertia melhanioides auct. non F.Muell.: Jessup, L.W. (2007)

Species of plant

Hibbertia nemorosa is a species of flowering plant in the family Dilleniaceae and is endemic to north Queensland. It is a shrub with ridged branches, oblong leaves and yellow flowers arranged singly or in pairs in leaf axils with 40 to 48 stamens and up to eight staminodes arranged around two or three carpels.

== Description ==
Hibbertia nemorosa is a shrub with spreading, woody, ridged branches, and hairy foliage. It rarely grows to a height of more than 2 m (6 ft 7 in). The leaves are oblong, 45–60 mm (1.8–2.4 in) long and 12–20 mm (0.47–0.79 in) wide on a petiole 2–3.5 mm (0.079–0.138 in) long. The flowers are arranged singly or in pairs in leaf axils along the upper branches on a stiff peduncle 7.4–15 mm (0.29–0.59 in) long, with linear to narrow spatula-shaped bracts 4.2–7.3 mm (0.17–0.29 in) long. The five sepals are joined at the base, the outer sepal lobes 9.4–10.5 mm (0.37–0.41 in) long and the inner lobes 6.5–8.2 mm (0.26–0.32 in) long. The five petals are egg-shaped with the narrower end towards the base, yellow, 7.7–12.8 mm (0.30–0.50 in) long and there are 40 to 48 stamens and up to eight staminodes arranged around the two or three densely hairy-scaly carpels, each carpel with three or four ovules. Flowering occurs from January to August.

== Taxonomy ==
This hibbertia was first formally described in 2010 by Hellmut R. Toelken, and given the name Hibbertia heterotricha in the Journal of the Adelaide Botanic Gardens from specimens collected in 1962 in the Mount Spec Range near Paluma by Clifford Gittins, in 1962. Later in 2010, in a subsequent edition of the Journal of the Adelaide Botanic Gardens, Toelken changed the name to Hibbertia nemorosa because the name H. heterotricha was already in use for a different taxon (H. heterotricha Bureaeu ex Guillamin). The specific epithet (nemorosa) means "growing in woods", referring to the habitat of this species.

== Distribution and habitat ==
This hibbertia grows in wet forest in the Paluma and Mount Spec ranges and on Hinchinbrook Island in north Queensland.

== Conservation status ==
Hibbertia nemorosa is classified as of "least concern" under the Queensland Government Nature Conservation Act 1992.

== See also ==
- List of Hibbertia species
