= Hibbertia alopecota =

Scientific classification
- Kingdom: Plantae
- Clade: Tracheophytes
- Clade: Angiosperms
- Clade: Eudicots
- Order: Dilleniales
- Family: Dilleniaceae
- Genus: Hibbertia
- Species: H. alopecota

Binomial name
- Hibbertia alopecota Toelken

Species of flowering plant

Hibbertia alopecota is a species of flowering plant in the family Dilleniaceae and is endemic to the Northern Territory. It is a low shrub with elliptic to lance-shaped leaves and yellow flowers arranged singly in leaf axils, with sixteen to twenty-four stamens arranged in bundles around two carpels.

== Description ==
Hibbertia alopecota is a shrub that typically grows to a height of up to 60 cm (24 in), with ridged, hairy branchlets that are up to 1 m (3 ft 3 in) long. The leaves are elliptic to lance-shaped with the narrower end towards the base, 10–30 mm (0.39–1.18 in) long and 6–20 mm (0.24–0.79 in) wide on a petiole 0.4–1 mm (0.016–0.039 in) long. The flowers are arranged singly in leaf axils or on the ends of side shoots, with leaf-like bracts about 2–3 mm (0.079–0.118 in) long and wide. The five sepals are joined at the base, the outer sepal lobes 3.8–5.6 mm (0.15–0.22 in) long and the inner lobes 3.2–4.7 mm (0.13–0.19 in) long. The five petals are yellow, 3.8–5.4 mm (0.15–0.21 in) long and there are sixteen to twenty-four stamens arranged in bundles around the two carpels, each carpel with two ovules. Flowering occurs from February to August.

== Taxonomy ==
Hibbertia alopecota was first formally described in 2010 by Hellmut R. Toelken in the Journal of the Adelaide Botanic Gardens from specimens collected near Fisher Creek in the Northern Territory in 1990. The specific epithet (alopecota) means "fox-ears", referring to the hairs on the outer sepal lobes.

== Distribution and habitat ==
This hibbertia grows on sedimentary rocks in sandy soil and mostly occurs on the lower slopes of the western escarpment of the Arnhem Land Plateau in the Northern Territory.

== See also ==
- List of Hibbertia species
