= Hibbertia juncea =

Scientific classification
- Kingdom: Plantae
- Clade: Tracheophytes
- Clade: Angiosperms
- Clade: Eudicots
- Order: Dilleniales
- Family: Dilleniaceae
- Genus: Hibbertia
- Species: H. juncea

Binomial name
- Hibbertia juncea Toelken

Species of plant

Hibbertia juncea is a species of flowering plant in the family Dilleniaceae and is endemic to the Northern Territory. It is a small shrub with leaves reduced to minute scales, and white to cream-coloured or pink flowers arranged in leaf axils with seven to ten stamens.

== Description ==
Hibbertia juncea is a shrublet that typically grows to a height of up to 1.5 m (4 ft 11 in) and has stems up to 5 mm (0.20 in) wide with branchlets 1–2 mm (0.039–0.079 in) wide, the branchlets forming rhizomes. The leaves are reduced to minute scales. The flowers are arranged on peduncles 1–8 mm (0.039–0.315 in) long, the outer sepal lobes 2.5–3.5 mm (0.098–0.138 in) long and the inner lobes 3.25–5.0 mm (0.128–0.197 in) long. The five petals are white to cream-coloured or pink, 3.75–5.5 mm (0.148–0.217 in) long and there are seven to ten stamens arranged around the carpels. Flowering occurs from November to August.

== Taxonomy ==
This species was first formally described in 1863 by George Bentham who gave it the name Pachynema junceum in Flora Australiensis. In 2009, James W. Horn changed the name to Hibbertia juncea in the International Journal of Plant Sciences.

== Distribution and habitat ==
This hibbertia grows in savanna and is widespread and common from the Victoria River to north-eastern Arnhem Land in the northern part of the Northern Territory.

== Conservation status ==
Hibbertia juncea is classified as "least concern" under the Territory Parks and Wildlife Conservation Act 1976.

== See also ==
- List of Hibbertia species
