= Hibbertia tridentata =

Scientific classification
- Kingdom: Plantae
- Clade: Tracheophytes
- Clade: Angiosperms
- Clade: Eudicots
- Order: Dilleniales
- Family: Dilleniaceae
- Genus: Hibbertia
- Species: H. tridentata

Binomial name
- Hibbertia tridentata Toelken

Species of flowering plant

Hibbertia tridentata is a species of flowering plant in the family Dilleniaceae and is only known from a single population in Arnhem Land in the Northern Territory. It is a shrub with a few wiry branches, egg-shaped to triangular leaves with the narrower end towards the base, and yellow flowers usually arranged singly in leaf axils with eighteen to twenty stamens arranged around two densely scaly carpels.

== Description ==
Hibbertia tridentata is a shrub with a few wiry branches up to 60 cm (24 in), the foliage mostly covered with rosette-like hairs. The leaves are egg-shaped to triangular with the narrower end towards the base, mostly 12.5–16 mm (0.49–0.63 in) long and 9–12 mm (0.35–0.47 in) wide on a petiole 0.3–1.1 mm (0.012–0.043 in) long. The flowers are usually arranged singly in leaf axils on a thread-like peduncle 4.4–10.8 mm (0.17–0.43 in) long, with linear bracts 2.6–3.5 mm (0.10–0.14 in) long at the base. The five sepals are joined at the base, the two outer sepal lobes lance-shaped, 5.2–6.1 mm (0.20–0.24 in) long and about 2 mm (0.079 in) wide, and the inner lobes about slightly broader. The five petals are oblong, yellow, 2.4–3.1 mm (0.094–0.122 in) long with a small notch at the tip and there are eighteen to twenty stamens arranged around the two densely scaly carpels, each carpel with two ovules.

== Taxonomy ==
Hibbertia tridentata was first formally described in 2010 by Hellmut R. Toelken in the Journal of the Adelaide Botanic Gardens from a specimen collected near Maningrida in 2000. The specific epithet (tridentata) means "three-toothed", referring to the leaves.

== Distribution ==
This hibbertia is only known from a single location where it grows on scree slopes in heath-like scrub in Arnhem Land.

== Conservation status ==
Hibbertia tridentata is classified as "data deficient" under the Northern Territory Government Territory Parks and Wildlife Conservation Act 1976.

== See also ==
- List of Hibbertia species
