= Hibbertia ciliolata =

Scientific classification
- Kingdom: Plantae
- Clade: Tracheophytes
- Clade: Angiosperms
- Clade: Eudicots
- Order: Dilleniales
- Family: Dilleniaceae
- Genus: Hibbertia
- Species: H. ciliolata

Binomial name
- Hibbertia ciliolata Toelken

Species of flowering plant

Hibbertia ciliolata is a species of flowering plant in the family Dilleniaceae and is endemic to the northern part of the Northern Territory. It is a shrub with a single stem, hairy foliage, linear to elliptic leaves, and yellow flowers arranged in leaf axils, mostly with eighteen to twenty-six stamens arranged in groups around the two carpels.

== Description ==
Hibbertia ciliolata is a shrub that typically grows to a height of up to 1 m (3 ft 3 in), usually with a single stem with few branches, the foliage covered shield-like scales and rosette-like hairs on the upper leaf surface of the leaves. The leaves are linear to elliptic, 30–50 mm (1.2–2.0 in) long and 3.5–6 mm (0.14–0.24 in) wide on a petiole 0.5–3.2 mm (0.020–0.126 in) long. The flowers are arranged singly, in pairs or threes, in leaf axils on a thread-like peduncle 2.2–9.5 mm (0.087–0.374 in) long, with linear to lance-shaped bracts 5–8.4 mm (0.20–0.33 in) long. The five sepals are joined at the base, the two outer sepal lobes 4.4–5.2 mm (0.17–0.20 in) long and the inner lobes slightly shorter. The five petals are wedge-shaped to egg-shaped with the narrower end towards the base, yellow, 4.5–6.2 mm (0.18–0.24 in) long with a notch at the tip. There are eighteen to twenty-six stamens arranged in groups around the two carpels, each carpel with two ovules. Flowering occurs from November to June.

== Taxonomy ==
Hibbertia ciliolata was first formally described in 2010 by Hellmut R. Toelken in the Journal of the Adelaide Botanic Gardens from specimens collected by Lyndley Craven and Clyde Robert Dunlop near Woolaning High School in 1981. The specific epithet (ciliolata) refers to the usually short hairs on the scales on the undersurface of the leaves.

== Distribution and habitat ==
This hibbertia usually grows on sandstone or quartzite outcrops at the base of the Arnhem Land escarpment, but also as far west as Jasper Gorge in the Northern Territory.

== Conservation status ==
Goodenia ciliolata is classified as of "least concern" under the Northern Territory Government Territory Parks and Wildlife Conservation Act 1976.

== See also ==
- List of Hibbertia species
