= Hibbertia hirta =

Scientific classification
- Kingdom: Plantae
- Clade: Tracheophytes
- Clade: Angiosperms
- Clade: Eudicots
- Order: Dilleniales
- Family: Dilleniaceae
- Genus: Hibbertia
- Species: H. hirta

Binomial name
- Hibbertia hirta Toelken

Species of plant

Hibbertia hirta is a species of flowering plant in the family Dilleniaceae and is endemic to the Budawang Range in New South Wales. It is a shrub with hairy foliage, narrow elliptic to narrow lance-shaped leaves, and yellow flowers with eleven or twelve stamens arranged in a cluster on one side of the two carpels.

== Description ==
Hibbertia hirta is a shrub that typically grows to a height of up to 50 cm (20 in) with hairy foliage. The leaves are narrow elliptic to narrow lance-shaped with the narrower end towards the base, 7–14 mm (0.28–0.55 in) long and 1–3 mm (0.039–0.118 in) wide with the edges rolled under. The flowers are arranged singly on the ends of the branchlets on a peduncle 3–8 mm (0.12–0.31 in) long, with linear bracts 4.2–6.3 mm (0.17–0.25 in) long. The five sepals are joined at the base, the two outer sepal lobes 6–6.5 mm (0.24–0.26 in) long and the inner lobes slightly shorter. The five petals are egg-shaped with the narrower end towards the base, yellow, 4.1–5.6 mm (0.16–0.22 in) long. There are eleven or twelve stamens arranged in a single cluster on one side of the two carpels, each carpel with two ovules.

== Taxonomy ==
Hibbertia hirta was first formally described in 1998 by Hellmut R. Toelken in the Journal of the Adelaide Botanic Gardens from specimens collected in 1971. The specific epithet (hirta) means "hairy", referring to the fine spreading hairs on most of the plant.

== Distribution and habitat ==
This hibbertia grows in association with sandstone or conglomerate in the Budawang Range, Morton National Park.

== See also ==
- List of Hibbertia species
