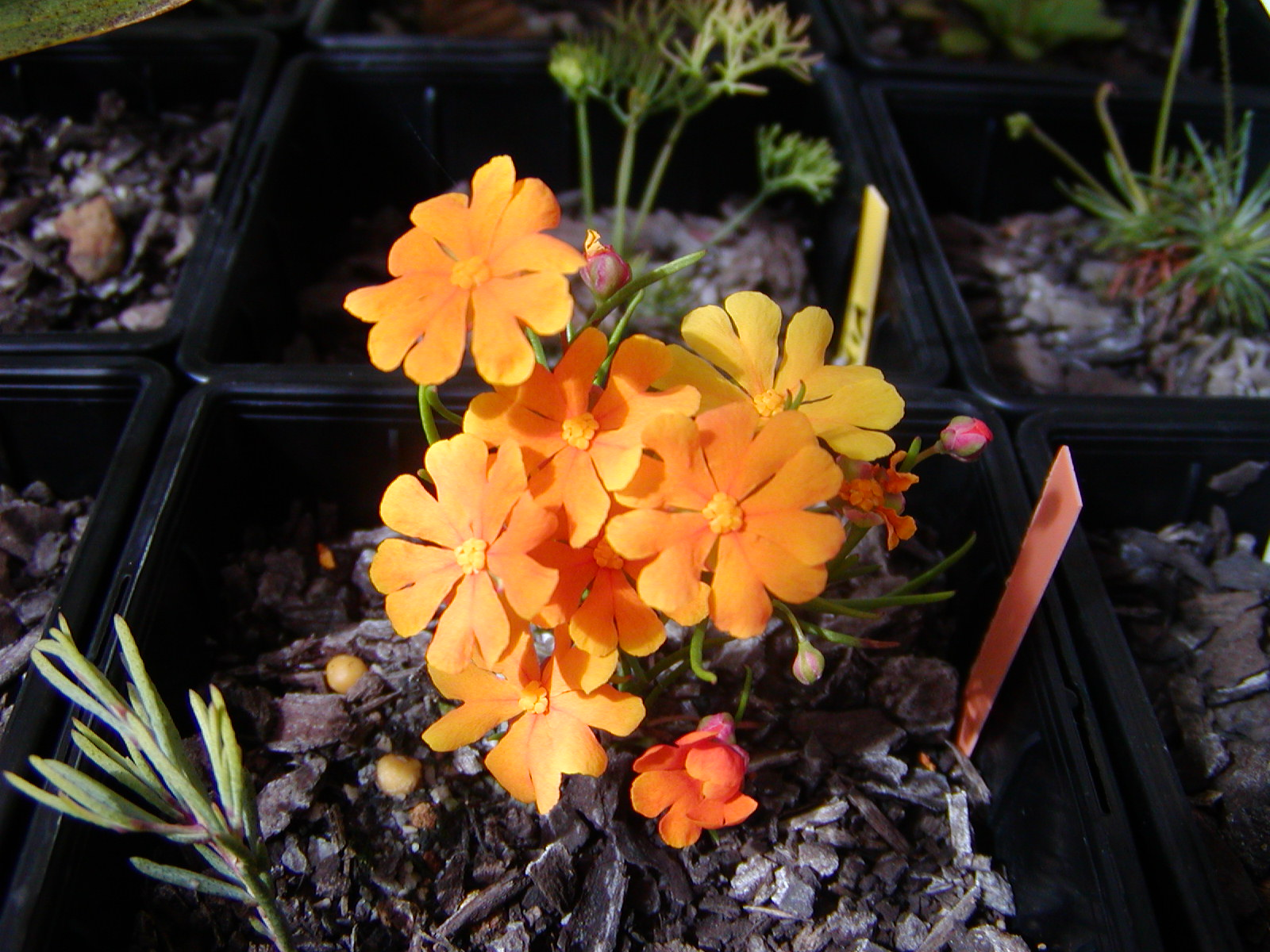
- Hibbertia stellaris

Scientific classification
- Kingdom: Plantae
- Clade: Embryophytes
- Clade: Tracheophytes
- Clade: Angiosperms
- Clade: Eudicots
- Clade: Core eudicots
- Order: Dilleniales; DC. ex Bercht. & J.Presl

Families
- Dilleniaceae

= Dilleniales =

Dilleniales Temporal range: Early Paleogene – Recent 52–0 Ma

Order of flowering plants

The Dilleniales are an order of flowering plants, potentially containing one family, Dilleniaceae. The APG III system of 2009, like the earlier APG II system of 2003, left the Dilleniaceae unplaced as to order, while noting that the name Dilleniales was available. Stevens at the Angiosperm Phylogeny Website has subsequently placed Dilleniaceae in the order Dilleniales.

The Cronquist system, of 1981, recognized such an order and placed it in subclass Dilleniidae. It used the following circumscription:

- order Dilleniales
  family Dilleniaceae

The Takhtajan system of 1969 had the families Dilleniaceae and Crossosomataceae in the order.

The APG III system assigned the second of these families, the Paeoniaceae, to the order Saxifragales.
