= Hellmut R. Toelken =

Australian botanist (born 1939)

Hellmut R. Toelken (born 1939 in Windhoek, South-West Africa, today Namibia) is a South Australian botanist. He retired in December 2008 from the position of senior biologist at the State Herbarium of South Australia, but remains an honorary research associate. Earlier he was with the Botanical Research Institute, Department of Agricultural Technical Services, Pretoria, South Africa.

His interests include the genera Kunzea, Hibbertia, Crassula and Carpobrotus. He is the author of the book A Revision of the Genus Crassula in Southern Africa. The standard author abbreviation Toelken is used to indicate this person as the author when citing a botanical name.

The New Zealand plant species Kunzea toelkenii is named after him.
