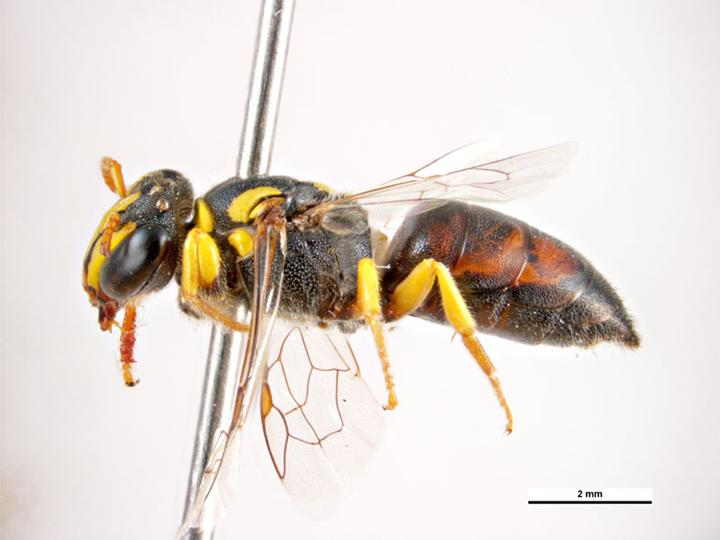
- Female

Scientific classification
- Kingdom: Animalia
- Phylum: Arthropoda
- Clade: Pancrustacea
- Class: Insecta
- Order: Hymenoptera
- Family: Colletidae
- Genus: Hylaeus
- Species: H. elegans

Binomial name
- Hylaeus elegans (Smith, 1853)

Synonyms
- Prosopis elegans Smith, 1853; Prosopis sydneyana Cockerell, 1905; Prosopis elegans huseloides Cockerell, 1910; Prosopis rollei Cockerell, 1910; Euprosopis nodosicornis Cockerell, 1913; Hylaeus rubripes Friese, 1924; Prosopis flaviceps Friese, 1924; Euprosopis elegans hillii Rayment, 1930; Euprosopis elegans maculata Rayment, 1930; Euprosopis elegans occidentalis Rayment, 1930; Euprosopis elegans labiata Rayment, 1930; Euprosopis elegans smithii Rayment, 1930

= Hylaeus elegans =

Species of bee

Hylaeus elegans, or Hylaeus (Euprosopis) elegans, is a species of bee in the family Colletidae and subfamily Hylaeinae. It is endemic to Australia. It was described by English entomologist Frederick Smith in 1853.

== Distribution and habitat ==
The species occurs across much of mainland Australia.

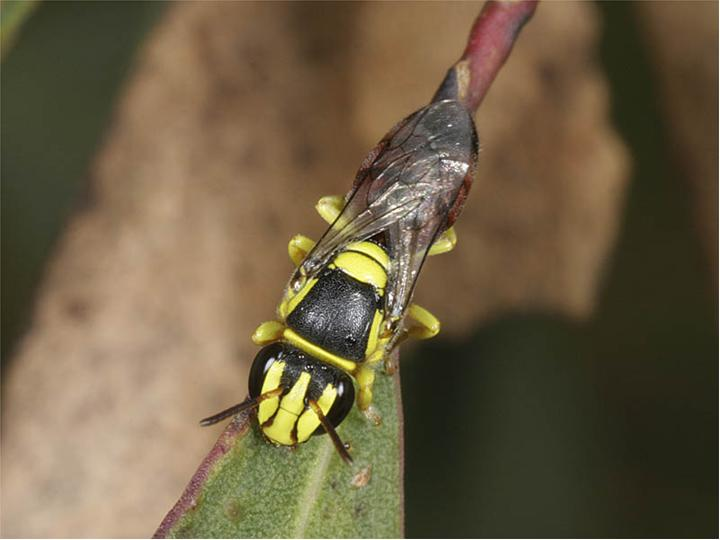
Female, dorsal view

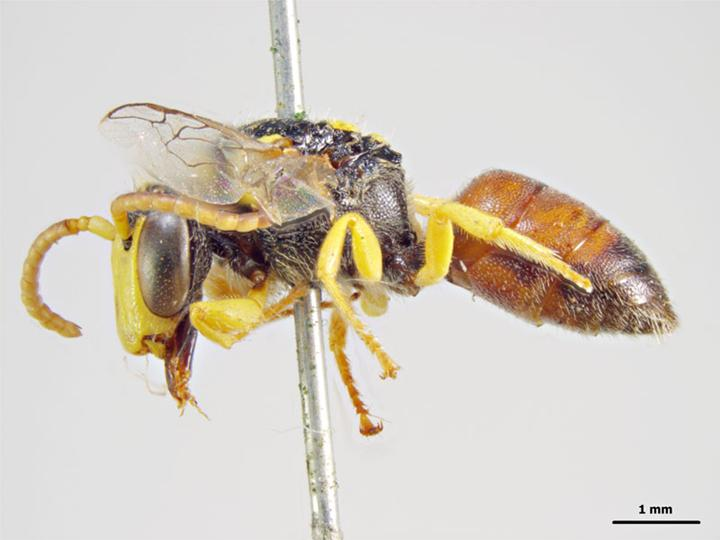
Male

== Behaviour ==
The adults are solitary flying mellivores that nest in any suitable cavities, including plant-tubes, posts, and the abandoned galleries of other bees or of longicorn beetles. Flowering plants visited by the bees include Acacia, Angophora, Atalaya, Callistemon, Calytrix, Eucalyptus, Eucarya, Leptospermum, Melaleuca, Schinus and Tristaniopsis species.

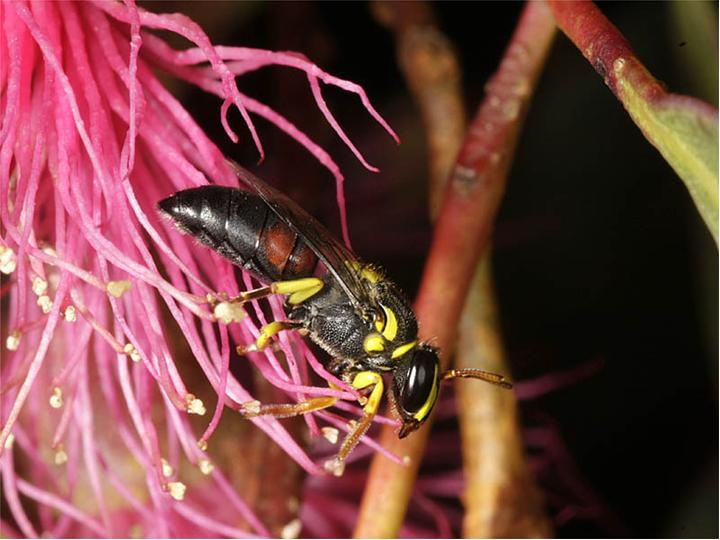
On Eucalyptus leucoxylon flowers
