= Atalaya angustifolia =

Conservation status
- Least Concern (IUCN 3.1)

Scientific classification
- Kingdom: Plantae
- Clade: Embryophytes
- Clade: Tracheophytes
- Clade: Spermatophytes
- Clade: Angiosperms
- Clade: Eudicots
- Clade: Rosids
- Order: Sapindales
- Family: Sapindaceae
- Genus: Atalaya
- Species: A. angustifolia

Binomial name
- Atalaya angustifolia S.T.Reynolds

Species of flowering plant

Atalaya angustifolia, is a species of small tree in the family Sapindaceae.

== Description ==
It can grow to be 5 metres tall. It grows in eucalypt woodland, in sandy or rocky soils. It is similar to Atalaya hemiglauca but with more leaflets that are smaller and narrower.

== Habitat and distribution ==
It is endemic to the Cape York Peninsula of Queensland, Australia, occurring from Coen to Maytown.
