= Hibbertia orbicularis =

Scientific classification
- Kingdom: Plantae
- Clade: Tracheophytes
- Clade: Angiosperms
- Clade: Eudicots
- Order: Dilleniales
- Family: Dilleniaceae
- Genus: Hibbertia
- Species: H. orbicularis

Binomial name
- Hibbertia orbicularis Toelken

Species of plant

Hibbertia oligocarpa is a species of flowering plant in the family Dilleniaceae and is endemic to part of the Arnhem Land plateau in the Northern Territory. It is a shrublet with spreading branches, broadly elliptic to round leaves and yellow flowers with 35 to 40 stamens arranged in groups around two carpels.

== Description ==
Hibbertia orbicularis is a shrublet that typically grows to a height of 30 cm (12 in) and has reddish, trailing or scrambling stems. The foliage is covered with bundled, rosette-like hairs. The leaves are broadly elliptic to round, 5–8 mm (0.20–0.31 in) long and 3–7.5 mm (0.12–0.30 in) wide on a petiole 0.2–1.5 mm (0.0079–0.0591 in) long. The flowers are arranged singly in leaf axils on a thread-like peduncle 3–6 mm (0.12–0.24 in) long, with lance-shaped to egg-shaped bracts 1.3–1.8 mm (0.051–0.071 in) long at the base. The five sepals are joined at the base, the two outer sepal lobes 2.2–3.3 mm (0.087–0.130 in) long and the three inner lobes 3.1–3.5 mm (0.12–0.14 in) long. The five petals are yellow and wedge- shaped to egg-shaped with the narrower end towards the base, 3.3–4.1 mm (0.13–0.16 in) long with two lobes at the tip. There are 35 to 40 stamens in bundles around the two carpels, each with two ovules. Flowering occurs from January to June.

== Taxonomy ==
Hibbertia orbicularis was first formally described in 2010 by Hellmut R. Toelken in the Journal of the Adelaide Botanic Gardens from specimens collected near the headwater of the East Alligator River by Lyndley Craven and Glenn Wightman. The specific epithet (orbicularis) means "a small circle", referring to the shape of the leaves.

== Distribution and habitat ==
This hibbertia grows on sandstone ledges and slopes in the north-west part of the Arnhem Land plateau in the Northern Territory.

== See also ==
- List of Hibbertia species
