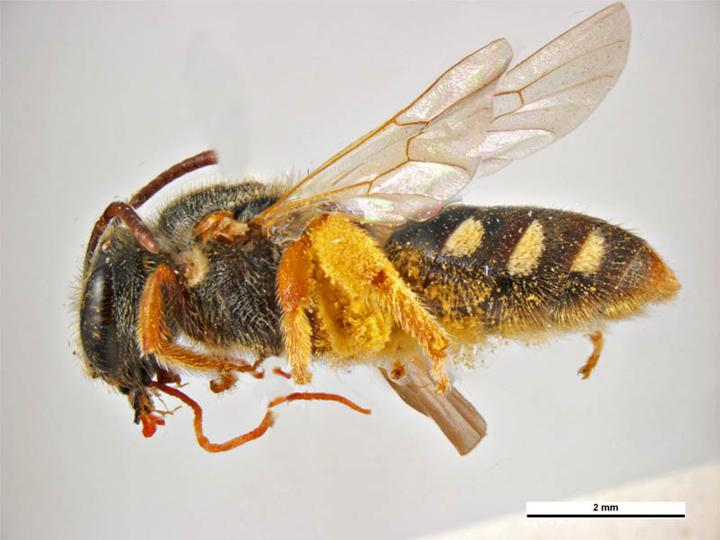
- Female

Scientific classification
- Kingdom: Animalia
- Phylum: Arthropoda
- Clade: Pancrustacea
- Class: Insecta
- Order: Hymenoptera
- Family: Halictidae
- Genus: Lasioglossum
- Species: L. conspicuum

Binomial name
- Lasioglossum conspicuum Smith, 1879

Synonyms
- Halictus conspicuus Smith, 1879; Halictus alboguttatus Friese, 1924

= Lasioglossum conspicuum =

Species of bee

Lasioglossum conspicuum, or Lasioglossum (Chilalictus) conspicuum, is a species of bee in the family Halictidae and subfamily Halictinae. It is endemic to Australia. It was described by English entomologist Frederick Smith in 1879.

== Distribution and habitat ==
The species occurs in central and eastern mainland Australia.

== Behaviour ==
The adults are flying mellivores. Flowering plants visited by the bees include Acacia, Atalaya, Eucalyptus, Melaleuca and Schinus species.

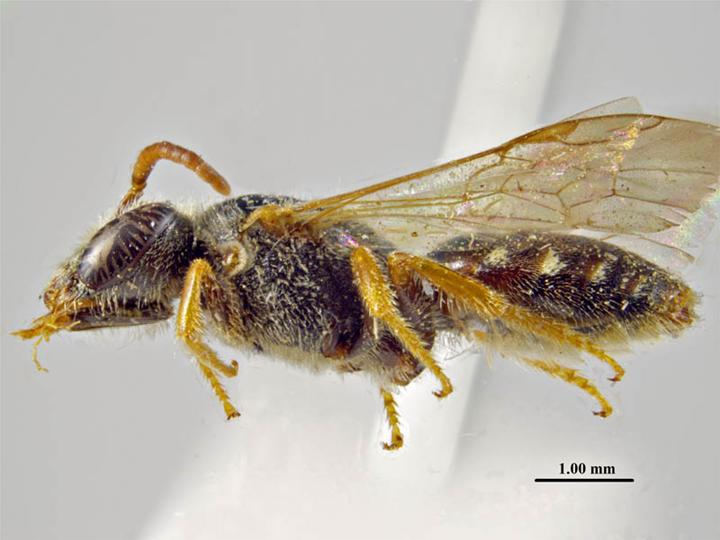
Male
