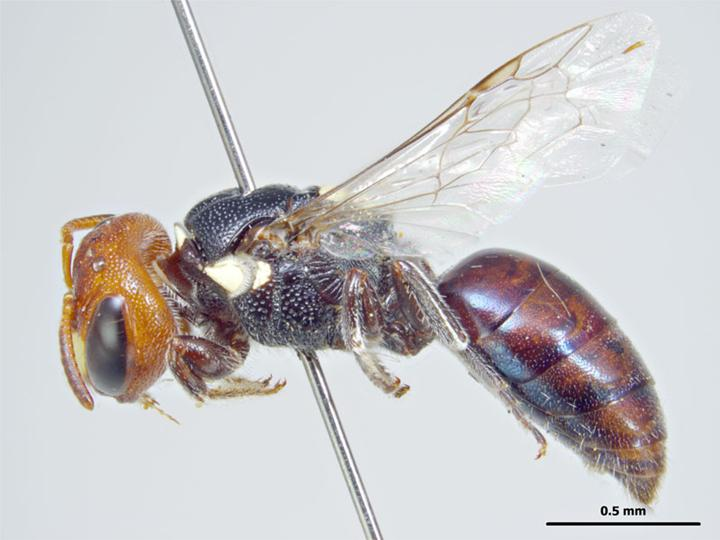
- Female (nominate ssp.)

Scientific classification
- Kingdom: Animalia
- Phylum: Arthropoda
- Clade: Pancrustacea
- Class: Insecta
- Order: Hymenoptera
- Family: Colletidae
- Genus: Hylaeus
- Species: H. ruficeps

Binomial name
- Hylaeus ruficeps (Smith, 1853)

Synonyms
- Prosopis ruficeps Smith, 1853; Prosopis fulvicornis Smith, 1853; Prosopis purpurata Smith, 1879; Prosopis cassiae Cockerell, 1910; Prosopis kalamundae Cockerell, 1915; Prosopis kalamundae jugata Cockerell, 1915

= Hylaeus ruficeps =

Species of bee

Hylaeus ruficeps, or Hylaeus (Euprosopoides) ruficeps, is a species of bee in the family Colletidae and subfamily Hylaeinae. It is endemic to Australia. It was described by English entomologist Frederick Smith in 1853.

== Distribution and habitat ==
The species occurs across much of mainland Australia. Type localities include Adelaide in South Australia; Mackay, Queensland; and Kalamunda, Western Australia.

=== Subspecies ===
- H. r. ruficeps (Smith, 1853) – widespread
- H. r. kalamundae (Cockerell, 1915) – south-west Western Australia

== Behaviour ==
The adults are flying mellivores. Flowering plants visited by the bees include Angophora, Atalaya, Brachychiton, Dendrobium, Eucalyptus, Eugenia, Tristaniopsis and Xanthorrhoea species.

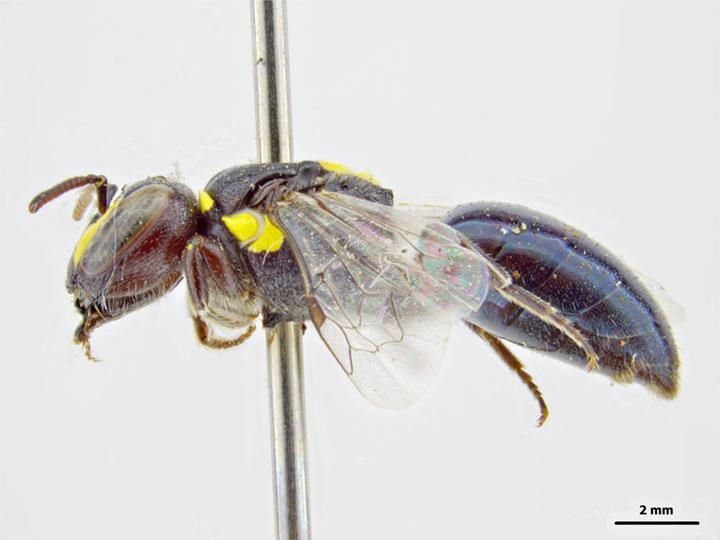
Female (ssp. kalamundae)

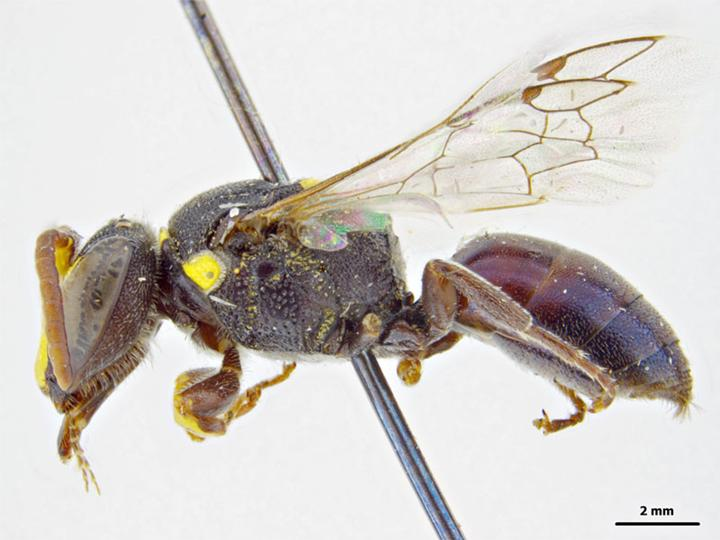
Male (ssp. kalamundae)

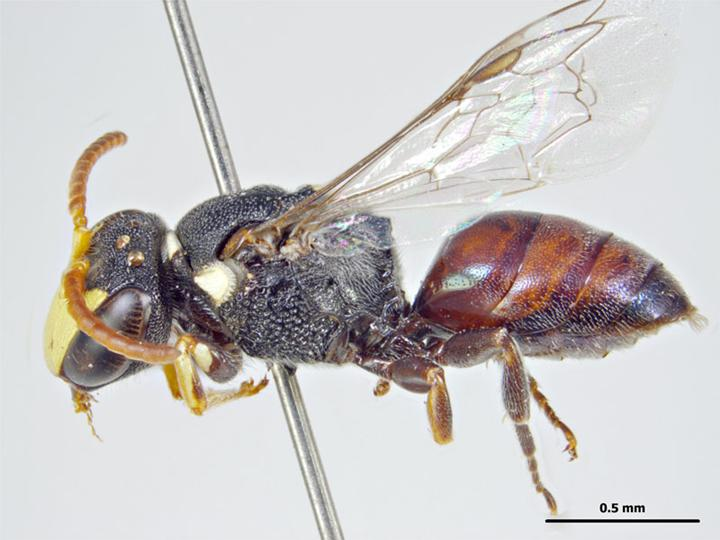
Male (nominate ssp.)
