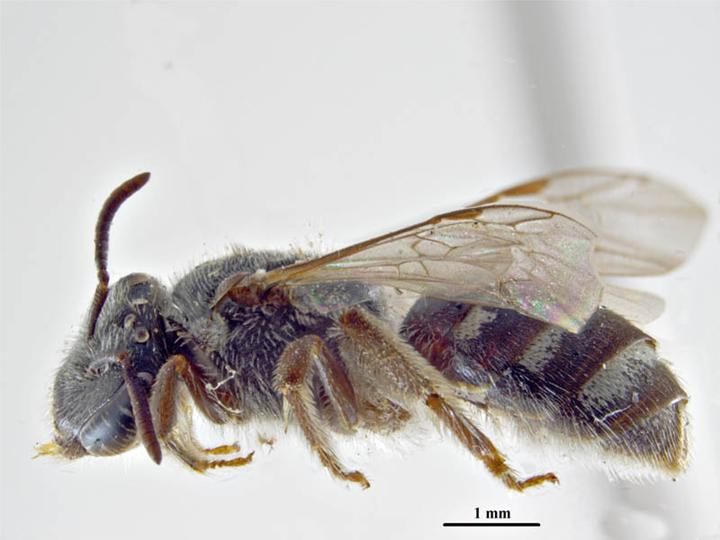
- Female
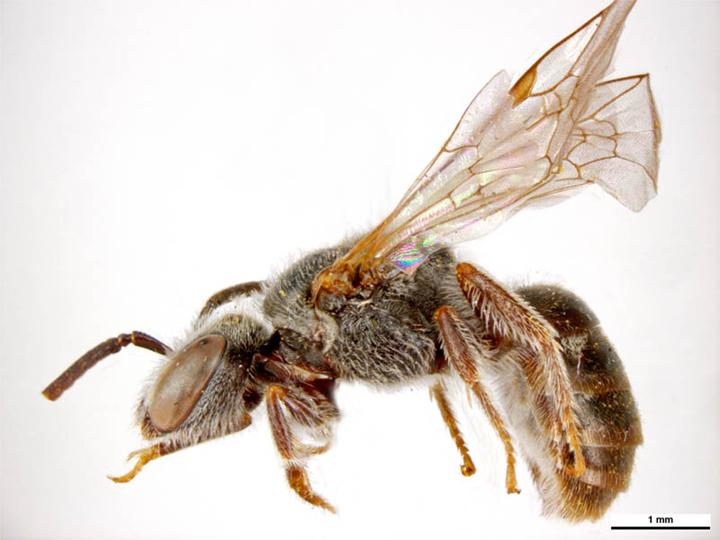
- Male

Scientific classification
- Kingdom: Animalia
- Phylum: Arthropoda
- Clade: Pancrustacea
- Class: Insecta
- Order: Hymenoptera
- Family: Halictidae
- Genus: Lasioglossum
- Species: L. cambagei

Binomial name
- Lasioglossum cambagei (Cockerell, 1910)

Synonyms
- Halictus cambagei Cockerell, 1910

= Lasioglossum cambagei =

Species of bee

Lasioglossum cambagei, or Lasioglossum (Chilalictus) cambagei, is a species of bee in the family Halictidae and subfamily Halictinae. It is endemic to Australia. It was described by British-American entomologist Theodore Dru Alison Cockerell in 1910.

== Description ==
Male body length is about 5.5 mm. Integumental colouration is mainly black and very dark brown, with reddish-brown markings. The hair is greyish-white.

== Distribution and habitat ==
The species occurs in south-eastern mainland Australia. The type locality is Adelaide.

== Behaviour ==
The adults are flying mellivores. Flowering plants visited by the bees include Acacia, Atalaya, Eucalyptus and Melaleuca species.
