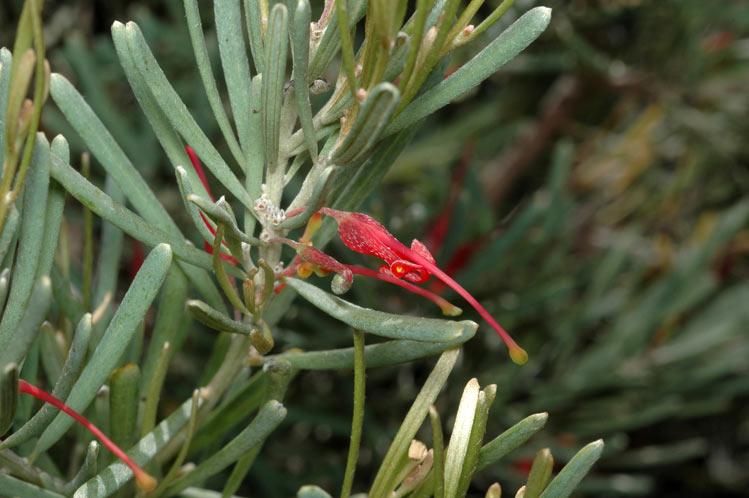
- In Kings Park, Perth

Scientific classification
- Kingdom: Plantae
- Clade: Tracheophytes
- Clade: Angiosperms
- Clade: Eudicots
- Order: Proteales
- Family: Proteaceae
- Genus: Grevillea
- Species: G. sparsiflora

Binomial name
- Grevillea sparsiflora F.Muell.

= Grevillea sparsiflora =

Species of shrub endemic to Western Australia

Grevillea sparsiflora, commonly known as sparse flowered grevillea, is a species of flowering plant in the family Proteaceae and is endemic to the south of Western Australia. It is a low, spreading shrub with crowded, linear leaves and pinkish-red flowers arranged singly or in groups of up to five.

== Description ==
Grevillea sparsiflora is a spreading shrub that typically grows to a height of 0.3–1.5 m (1 ft 0 in – 4 ft 11 in). Its leaves are crowded, erect, narrowly linear, 10–60 mm (0.39–2.36 in) long and 0.7–2.1 mm (0.028–0.083 in) wide. The leaves are covered with whitish, somewhat silky hairs when young and the edges are rolled under, enclosing the lower surface, apart from the midvein. The flowers are borne singly or in groups of up to 5 and are pinkish-red with a pinkish-orange, green-tipped style, the pistil 17.5–25 mm (0.69–0.98 in) long. Flowering mainly occurs from June to November and the fruit is an erect, elliptical follicle 12–16 mm (0.47–0.63 in) long.

This grevillea is similar to Grevillea decipiens which has 7–9 longitudinal ridges on the upper leaf surface, and flowers that are densely covered with silky brown hairs on the outside. Grevillea pauciflora is also similar, but has a shorter style.

== Taxonomy ==
Grevillea sparsiflora was first formally described by the botanist Ferdinand von Mueller in 1868 in his book Fragmenta Phytographiae Australiae from specimens collected by George Maxwell at Cape Arid.

== Distribution and habitat ==
Sparse flowered grevillea is found between Mount Ragged, to the east of Esperance and Twilight Cove in the Coolgardie, Hampton and Mallee bioregions of southern Western Australia. It grows on sand dunes, limestone cliffs and in eucalypt woodland in sandy and loamy soils.

== See also ==
- List of Grevillea species
