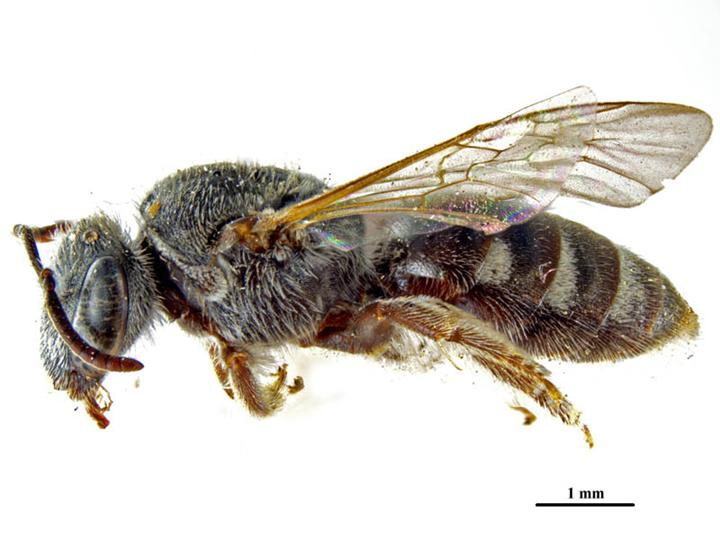
- Female
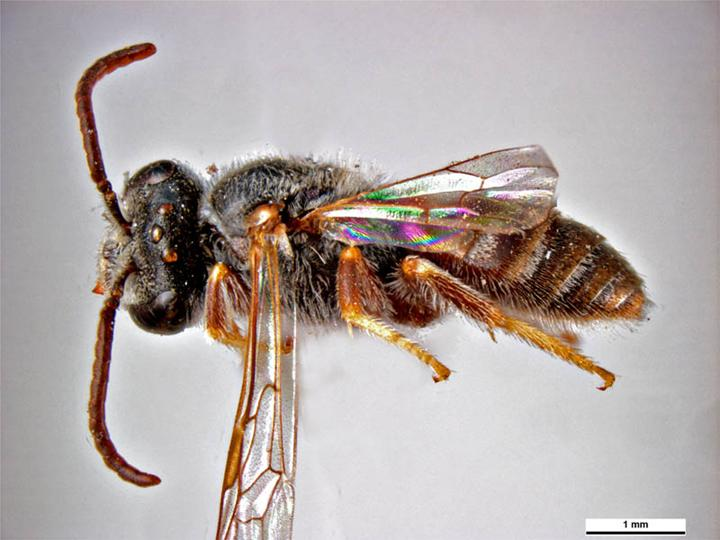
- Male

Scientific classification
- Kingdom: Animalia
- Phylum: Arthropoda
- Clade: Pancrustacea
- Class: Insecta
- Order: Hymenoptera
- Family: Halictidae
- Genus: Lasioglossum
- Species: L. expansifrons

Binomial name
- Lasioglossum expansifrons (Cockerell, 1914)

Synonyms
- Halictus expansifrons Cockerell, 1914

= Lasioglossum expansifrons =

Species of bee

Lasioglossum expansifrons, or Lasioglossum (Chilalictus) expansifrons, is a species of bee in the family Halictidae and subfamily Halictinae. It is endemic to Australia. It was described by British-American entomologist Theodore Dru Alison Cockerell in 1914.

== Description ==
Male body length is about 6 mm. Integumental colouration is mainly black, with reddish and cream to pale-yellow markings; the hair is dull white.

== Distribution and habitat ==
The species occurs in south-eastern mainland Australia.

== Behaviour ==
The adults are flying mellivores. Flowering plants visited by the bees include Atalaya, Baeckea, Bursaria, Eucalyptus, Helichrysum and Melaleuca species.
