= Atalaya collina =

Yarwun whitewood

Conservation status
- Endangered (EPBC Act)

Scientific classification
- Kingdom: Plantae
- Clade: Embryophytes
- Clade: Tracheophytes
- Clade: Spermatophytes
- Clade: Angiosperms
- Clade: Eudicots
- Clade: Rosids
- Order: Sapindales
- Family: Sapindaceae
- Genus: Atalaya
- Species: A. collina

Binomial name
- Atalaya collina S.T.Reynolds

Species of flowering plant

Atalaya collina, also known as the Yarwun whitewood, is a species of plant in the family Sapindaceae.

== Description ==
It is a small spreading tree which can grow up to 5m tall, with light grey rough bark. Leaves are compound with one or two pairs of leaflets. Leaflets are glossy green in colour, paler green below and narrowly elliptic in shape, to 7cm long. Flowers are small, cream coloured, up to 8mm in diameter and form dense clusters. The fruit is single seeded with an expanded dry, papery wing, 2.5-4cm long and occurs in clusters of 2 or 3.

== Habitat and distribution ==
It is endemic to central-eastern Queensland, with two occurrences in the Mt. Sugarloaf area near Gladstone as well as another near Nagoorin.

It occurs in semi-evergreen vine thicket or dry rainforest. Surface soils are moderately drained with brownish-black clay loams overlying clay subsoils.

== Conservation ==
It is listed as endangered by the Nature Conservation (Plants) Regulation 2020. The species is threatened by clearing of its habitat for grazing, as well as insect predation and fire damage.
