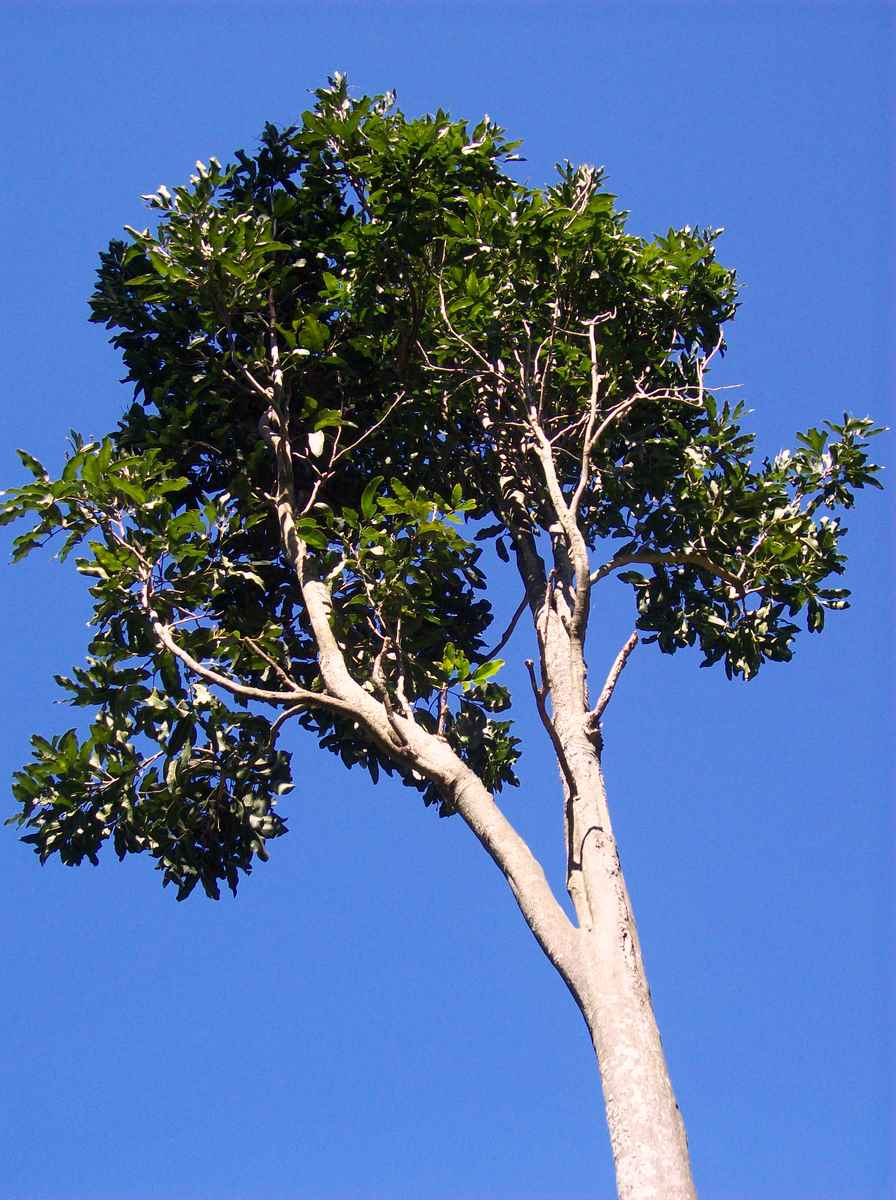

Scientific classification
- Kingdom: Plantae
- Clade: Tracheophytes
- Clade: Angiosperms
- Clade: Eudicots
- Clade: Rosids
- Order: Sapindales
- Family: Sapindaceae
- Genus: Atalaya
- Species: A. multiflora

Binomial name
- Atalaya multiflora Benth.

= Atalaya multiflora =

Species of tree

Atalaya multiflora, known as the broad leaved whitewood, is a rare and endangered rainforest tree of the soapberry family native to eastern Australia.

Its habitat is in the drier rainforest areas, often on rocky slopes of basalt. However, it is also seen in subtropical lowland rainforest growing on alluvial soils. It was described by prolific botanist George Bentham in his Flora Australiensis in 1863, and was given the specific name multiflora because of the numerous flowers.

== Description ==
A small tree up to 25 metres (80 ft) tall with a stem diameter of 40 cm (16 in). The base of the tree isn't quite cylindrical, but somewhat flanged and crooked. The bark is relatively smooth and greyish brown. Small branches are thick, marked with lenticels and showing obvious leaf scars.

=== Leaves ===
The compound leaves are arranged alternately on the stem and pinnate in shape, 7 to 24 cm (3–10 in) long with a stem 15 to 40 mm long. The leaflets are 4 to 12 cm (1.6–5 in) long, 1.5 to 4 cm (0.6-1.6 in) wide with a stem 2 to 5 mm long. There are usually two to three leaflets per compound leaf, oblong or ovate in shape, without leaf serrations. The leaflets are relatively thick and notched at the tip of the leaf. There are around 12 pairs of straight lateral leaf veins per leaflet, more easily seen on the underside.

=== Flowers, fruit & regeneration ===
From December to January, panicles form at the end of branchlets with abundant tiny creamy flowers. The flowers have five petals and sepals, and with eight stamens. Near the flowers are many small bracts.

The paired winged fruit (a fawn-coloured samara) forms from March to May, with each wing around 3 cm long opposite the round seed. Seeds last only a very short while on the ground, as they are soon attacked by insects. Fresh seeds should be soaked to kill insect larvae, then planted as soon as possible.
