= Atalaya natalensis =

Conservation status
- Vulnerable (IUCN 2.3)

Scientific classification
- Kingdom: Plantae
- Clade: Tracheophytes
- Clade: Angiosperms
- Clade: Eudicots
- Clade: Rosids
- Order: Sapindales
- Family: Sapindaceae
- Genus: Atalaya
- Species: A. natalensis

Binomial name
- Atalaya natalensis R.A.Dyer

Species of flowering plant

Atalaya natalensis, also called Natal wing-nut, is a species of plant in the family Sapindaceae. It is endemic to the Cape Provinces and KwaZulu-Natal in South Africa. It is threatened by habitat loss.
