= Atalaya sericopetala =

Conservation status
- Least Concern (IUCN 3.1)

Scientific classification
- Kingdom: Plantae
- Clade: Tracheophytes
- Clade: Angiosperms
- Clade: Eudicots
- Clade: Rosids
- Order: Sapindales
- Family: Sapindaceae
- Genus: Atalaya
- Species: A. sericopetala

Binomial name
- Atalaya sericopetala S.T.Reynolds

Species of flowering plant

Atalaya sericopetala, is a species of shrub or tree in the family Sapindaceae.

== Description ==
Grows up to 3 metres tall. Distinctive in having the petals densely silky all over the outer surface and in having both simple and pinnate leaves.

== Distribution ==
Occurs in North Queensland between Coen and Chillagoe.

== Habitat ==
Usually grows in monsoon forests.
