= Atalaya australiana =

Conservation status
- Least Concern (IUCN 3.1)

Scientific classification
- Kingdom: Plantae
- Clade: Tracheophytes
- Clade: Angiosperms
- Clade: Eudicots
- Clade: Rosids
- Order: Sapindales
- Family: Sapindaceae
- Genus: Atalaya
- Species: A. australiana

Binomial name
- Atalaya australiana Leenh.

Species of flowering plant

Atalaya australiana, is a species of tree in the family Sapindaceae.

== Description ==
Grows up to 20m tall. It is similar to Atalaya rigida but differs in having thinner leaves, shorter petiolules and smaller flowers.

== Habitat and distribution ==
Grows in beach scrub, strand forest & monsoon forest in North Queensland from the Torres Strait to Cape Flattery.
