= Atalaya capensis =

Conservation status
- Least Concern (IUCN 3.1)

Scientific classification
- Kingdom: Plantae
- Clade: Tracheophytes
- Clade: Angiosperms
- Clade: Eudicots
- Clade: Rosids
- Order: Sapindales
- Family: Sapindaceae
- Genus: Atalaya
- Species: A. capensis

Binomial name
- Atalaya capensis R.A.Dyer

Species of flowering plant

Atalaya capensis (also called Cape wing-nut) is a species of flowering plant in the family Sapindaceae. It is a tree endemic to the Cape Provinces of South Africa.
