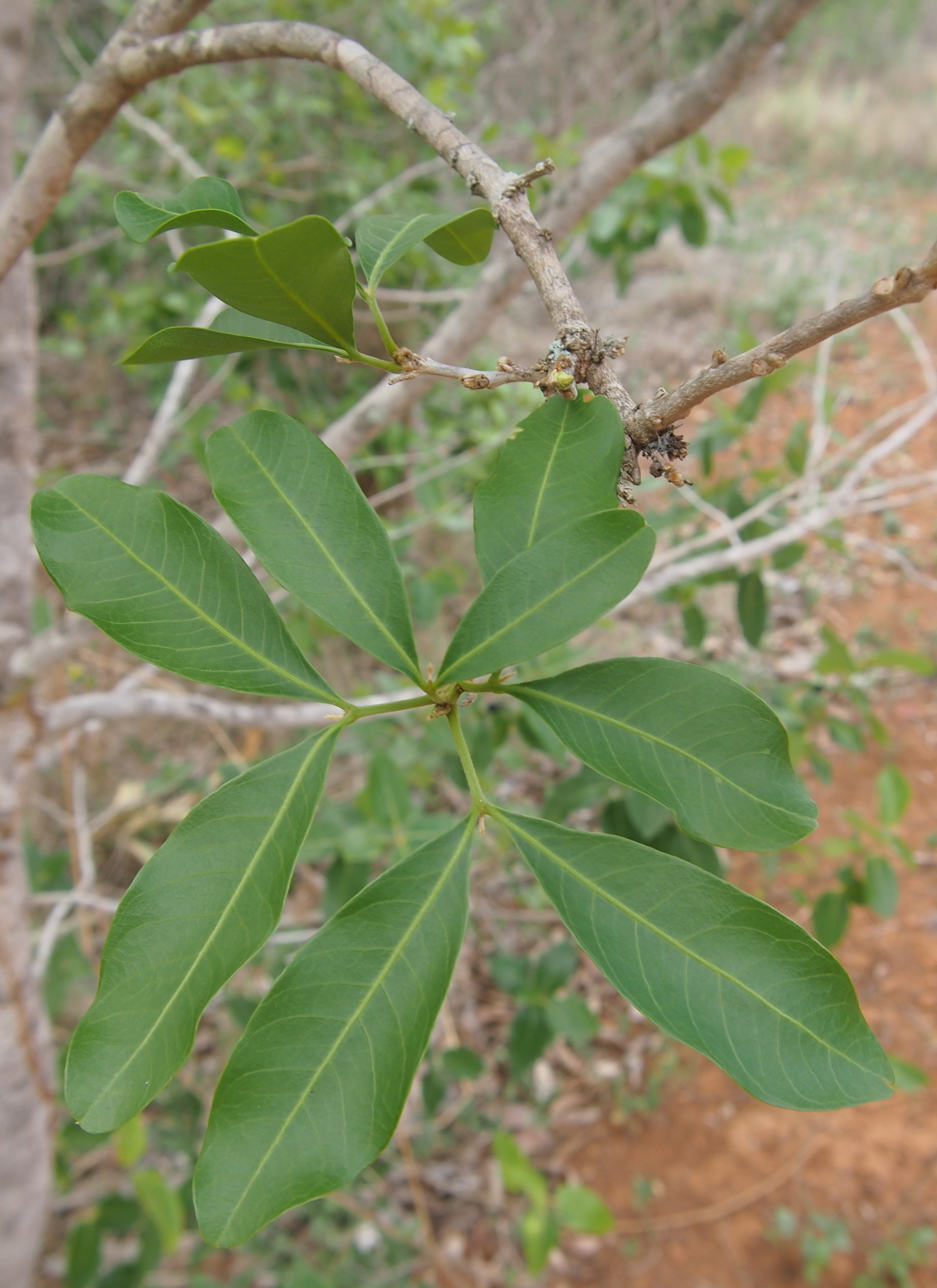

Scientific classification
- Kingdom: Plantae
- Clade: Tracheophytes
- Clade: Angiosperms
- Clade: Eudicots
- Clade: Rosids
- Order: Sapindales
- Family: Sapindaceae
- Genus: Atalaya
- Species: A. calcicola

Binomial name
- Atalaya calcicola S.T.Reynolds

= Atalaya calcicola =

Species of flowering plant

Atalaya calcicola is a species of trees native to Northern and Eastern Queensland.

A small tree, up to 10 metres tall, it is usually found growing in dry rainforests on limestone. The species produces characteristic flowers. The leaves are pinnate, usually with only two leaflets. The leaflet bases are very uneven.
