= Atalaya rigida =

Conservation status
- Least Concern (IUCN 3.1)

Scientific classification
- Kingdom: Plantae
- Clade: Tracheophytes
- Clade: Angiosperms
- Clade: Eudicots
- Clade: Rosids
- Order: Sapindales
- Family: Sapindaceae
- Genus: Atalaya
- Species: A. rigida

Binomial name
- Atalaya rigida S.T.Reynolds

Species of flowering plant

Atalaya rigida is a species of small tree or shrub in the family Sapindaceae.

== Description ==
It can reach a maximum height of 8 metres. Possesses dry, indehiscent samara fruit as well as elliptical or widely ovate compound leaves, which can grow to be 145 millimetres in length and 75 millimetres in width. Flowers from September to January and fruits from November to January. Closely related to Atalaya australiana, differing in the hard and rigid leaflets, longer petiolules and larger flowers.

== Habitat and distribution ==
It is endemic to Queensland, growing roughly from Cairns to Gympie.

== Conservation ==
Under the Nature Conservation Act 1992 it is regarded as Least Concern.
