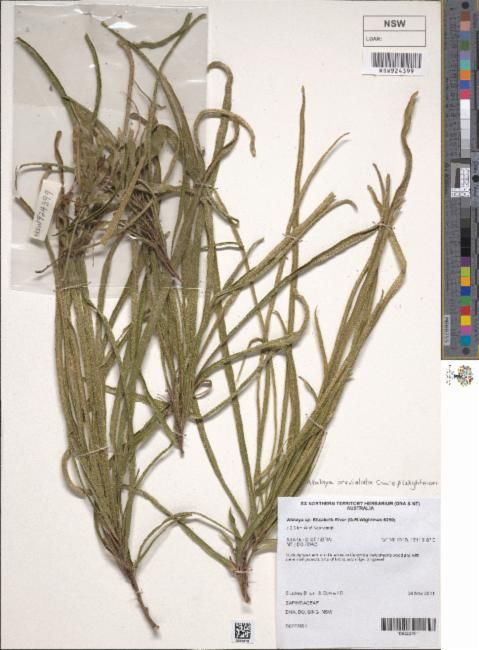
- specimen NSW924399 (CC-BY 4.0 National Herbarium of New South Wales

Conservation status
- Critically Endangered (TPWCA)

Scientific classification
- Kingdom: Plantae
- Clade: Tracheophytes
- Clade: Angiosperms
- Clade: Eudicots
- Clade: Rosids
- Order: Sapindales
- Family: Sapindaceae
- Genus: Atalaya
- Species: A. brevialata

Binomial name
- Atalaya brevialata Cowie & G.M.Wightman

Synonyms
- Atalaya sp. Elizabeth River (G.M.Wightman 6259)

= Atalaya brevialata =

Species of plant

Atalaya brevialata is a species of plant in the soapberry (Sapindaceae) family. It is native to northern Australia where it occurs in the Northern Territory.

== Description ==
This species of Atalaya has a perennial woody base with annual herbaceous parts growing to 45 cm above ground. It looks grass-like, but the leaves have pinnate venation.

== Taxonomy ==
Atalaya brevialata was first described in 2012 by Ian Cowie and Benjamin Stuckey. The species epithet, brevialata, or "short-winged", refers to the short wing of the samara.

== Distribution and habitat ==
The species is known only from the Elizabeth River valley in Darwin, where it is found near Virginia and west to north-west of Noonamah. It grows in woodland to open woodland on sandy soils amongst Eucalyptus tectifica and Corymbia foelscheana. A map showing where it has been collected is given by the Australian Virtual Herbarium.
