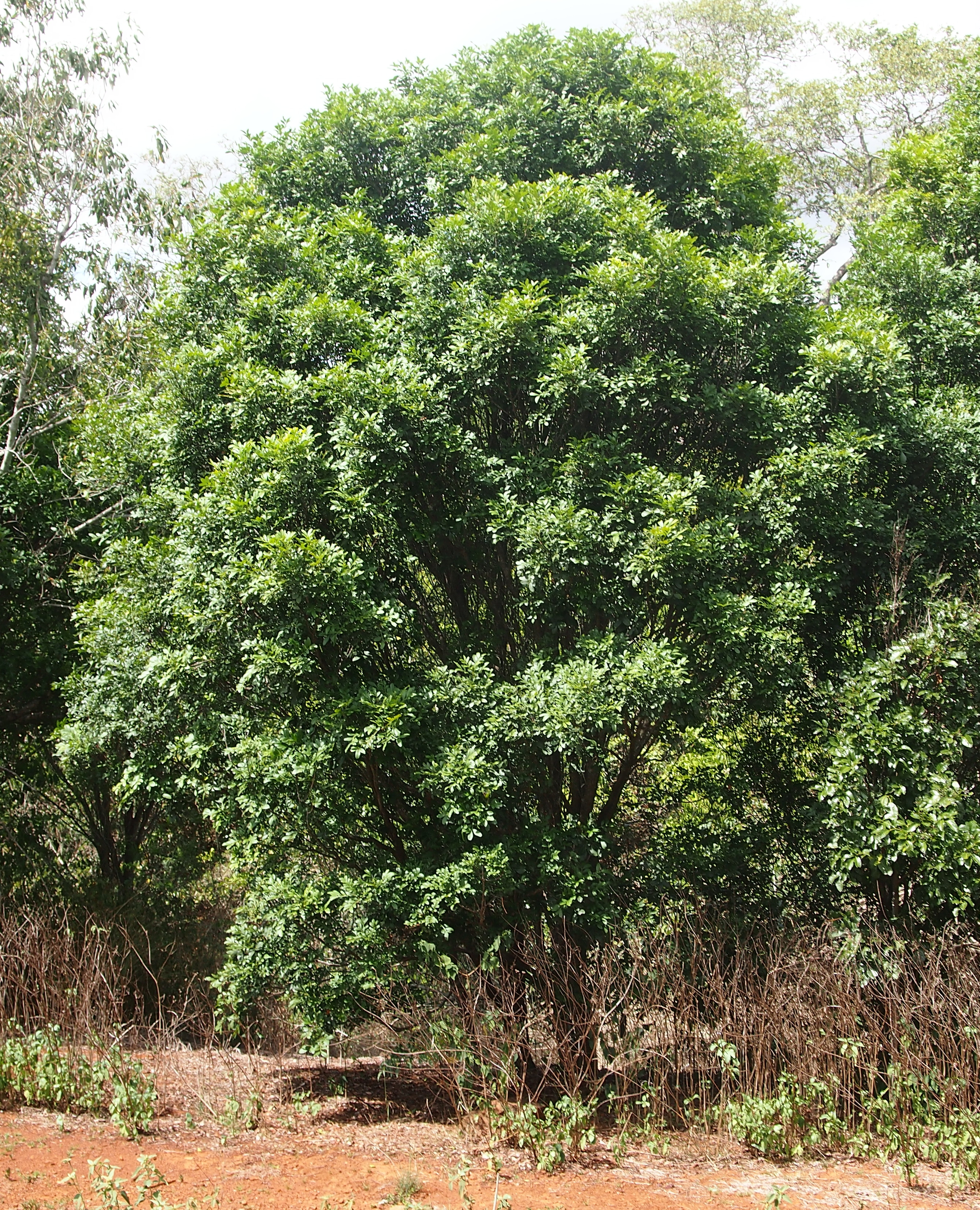

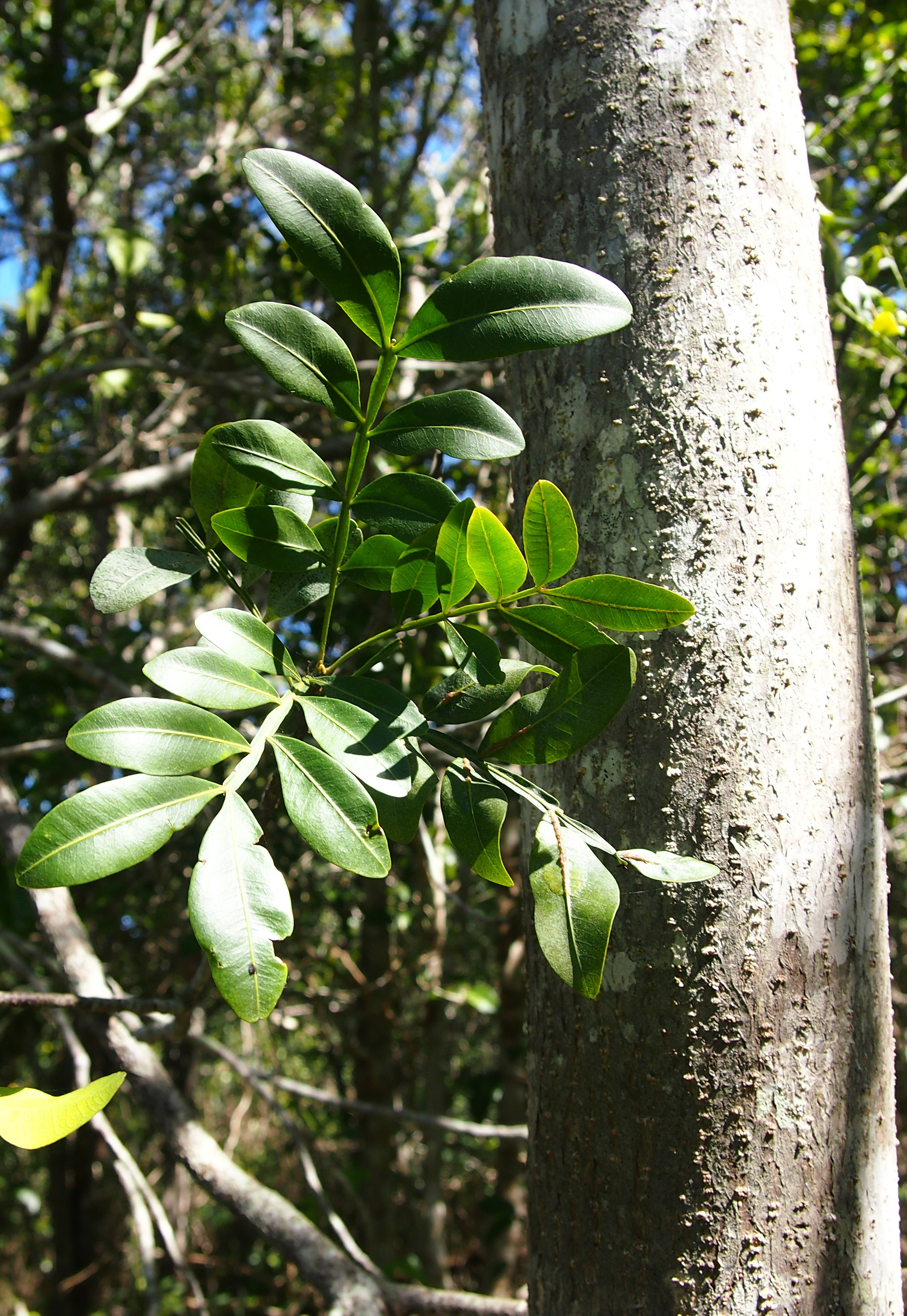
- Trunk and leaves.

Scientific classification
- Kingdom: Plantae
- Clade: Tracheophytes
- Clade: Angiosperms
- Clade: Eudicots
- Clade: Rosids
- Order: Sapindales
- Family: Sapindaceae
- Genus: Atalaya
- Species: A. salicifolia

Binomial name
- Atalaya salicifolia (DC.) Blume

= Atalaya salicifolia =

Species of flowering plant

Atalaya salicifolia is a species of tree native to dry rainforests of tropical and subtropical Australia, New Guinea and Malesia. The leaves of smaller trees of this species have a distinct winged rachis, in larger trees the rachis becomes increasingly cylindrical.
