= Atalaya variifolia =

Conservation status
- Least Concern (IUCN 3.1)

Scientific classification
- Kingdom: Plantae
- Clade: Tracheophytes
- Clade: Angiosperms
- Clade: Eudicots
- Clade: Rosids
- Order: Sapindales
- Family: Sapindaceae
- Genus: Atalaya
- Species: A. variifolia

Binomial name
- Atalaya variifolia (F.Muell.) F.Muell. ex Benth.

Species of flowering plant

Atalaya variifolia, is a species of tree in the family Sapindaceae.

== Description ==
It can grow up to 10 metres tall. Differs from other species of its genus in having a broadly winged rachis and petiole, and in having leaf-like wings.

== Habitat and distribution ==
Found in a variety of habitats from the Kimberley in Western Australia, across the top end of the Northern Territory, to the Cape York Peninsula and Atherton Tablelands of Queensland.
