= Atalaya oligoclada =

Scientific classification
- Kingdom: Plantae
- Clade: Tracheophytes
- Clade: Angiosperms
- Clade: Eudicots
- Clade: Rosids
- Order: Sapindales
- Family: Sapindaceae
- Genus: Atalaya
- Species: A. oligoclada

Binomial name
- Atalaya oligoclada S.T.Reynolds

Species of flowering plant

Atalaya oligoclada, is a species of shrub in the family Sapindaceae.

== Description ==
Distinguishable by its very low stature (sometimes only up to 0.5 m high), spindly shape, broad or narrow 2–4 pairs of leaflets per leaf, and large inflorescences, and also by its hairy inflorescences, fruits and leaves.

== Distribution ==
Common near Lakeland Downs, northern Queensland.

== Habitat ==
Usually grows on slopes and ridges in eucalypt woodlands.
