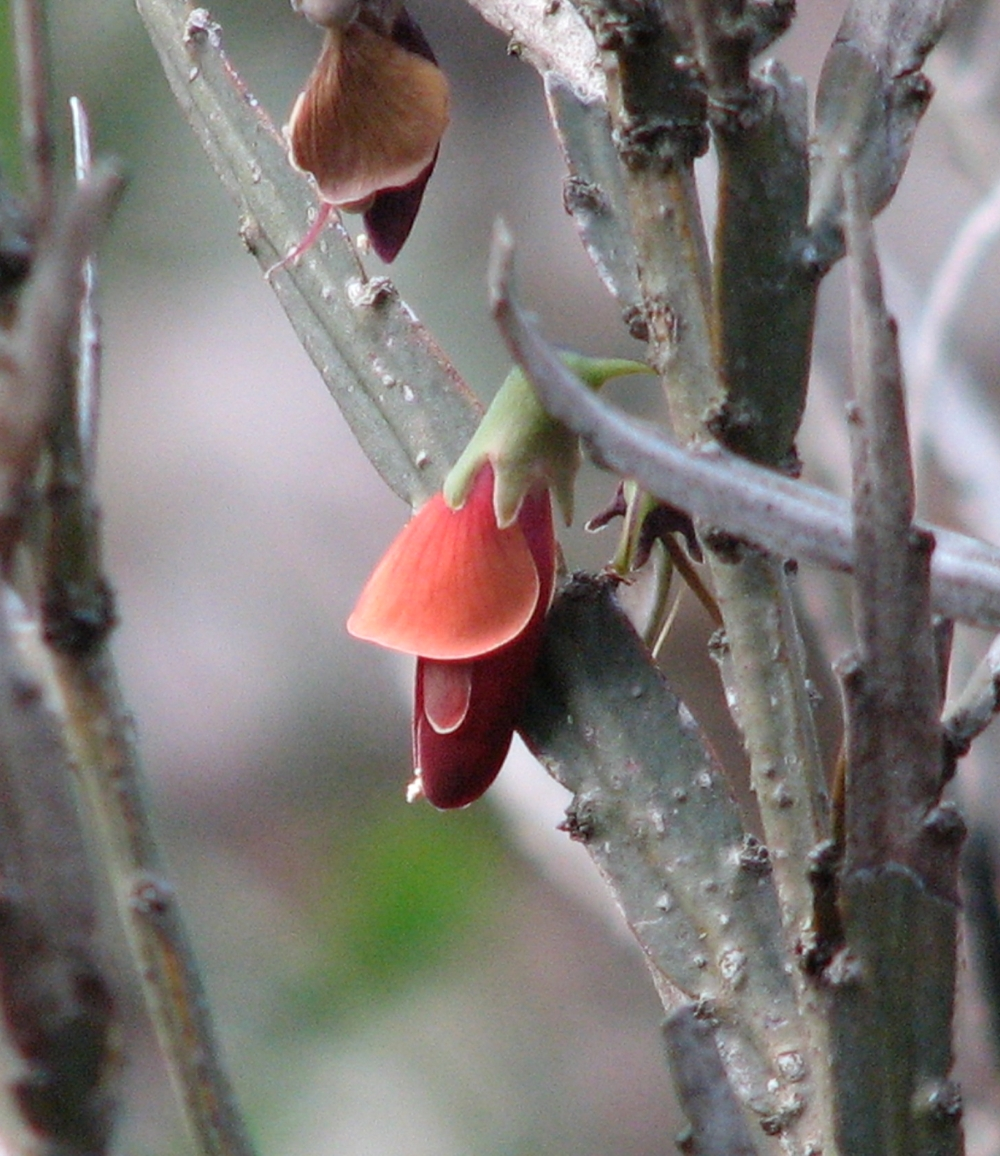
- Bossiaea walkeri in Maranoa Gardens

Scientific classification
- Kingdom: Plantae
- Clade: Tracheophytes
- Clade: Angiosperms
- Clade: Eudicots
- Clade: Rosids
- Order: Fabales
- Family: Fabaceae
- Subfamily: Faboideae
- Genus: Bossiaea
- Species: B. walkeri

Binomial name
- Bossiaea walkeri F.Muell.
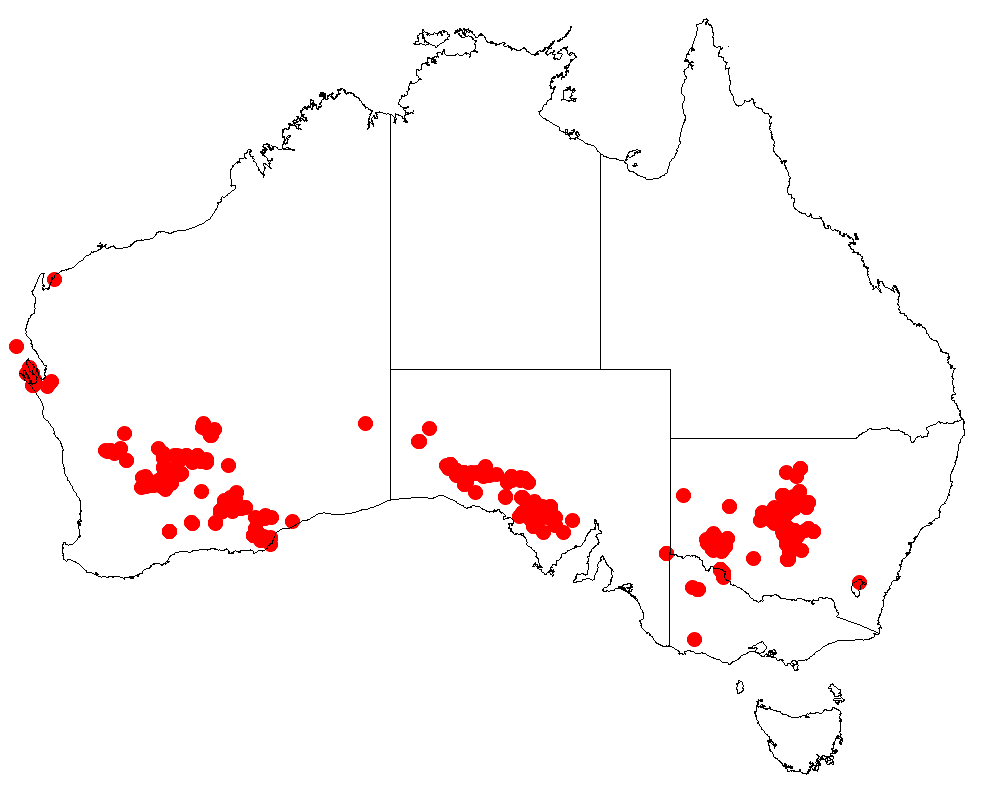
- Occurrence data from AVH

= Bossiaea walkeri =

Cactus bossiaea

Species of legume

Bossiaea walkeri, commonly known as cactus bossiaea, cactus pea, or Walker's stick bush, is a species of flowering plant in the pea family (Fabaceae) and is endemic to southern mainland Australia. It is a rigid, much-branched shrub with flattened, winged cladodes and red, pea-like flowers between July and November in the species' native range.

== Description ==
Bossiaea walkeri is a rigid, much-branched shrub that grows up to 2 m (6 ft 7 in) high and wide and is more or less glabrous. The stems and branches are flattened and winged, ending in cladodes 3–7 mm (0.12–0.28 in) wide. The leaves, when present, are reduced to scales about 2 mm (0.079 in) long, occasionally more or less round and up to 15 mm (0.59 in) long near the base or on young plants. The flowers are 20–25 mm (0.79–0.98 in) long and are borne singly at nodes on the cladodes on a pendent pedicel up to 5 mm (0.20 in) long with overlapping, broadly egg-shaped bracts up to 3 mm (0.12 in) long at the base. There are egg-shaped bracteoles 2.3–3.5 mm (0.091–0.138 in) long on the pedicel, but that fall off as the flower opens. The five sepals are about 10 mm (0.39 in) long and joined at the base, forming a tube 3.5–6.0 mm (0.14–0.24 in) long, the two upper lobes 2.3–5.5 mm (0.091–0.217 in) long and much longer than the lower three. The standard petal is usually red, 18–19 mm (0.71–0.75 in) long and shorter than the wings and keel that are each about 20 mm (0.79 in) long. The wings are salmon pink and the keel is deep red. Flowering occurs between July and November and the fruit is an oblong pod about 6 mm (0.24 in) long.

== Taxonomy ==
Bossiaea walkeri was first formally described in 1861 by Ferdinand von Mueller in Fragmenta Phytographiae Australiae from specimens collected by Alexander Walker on hills between the Lachlan and Murrumbidgee Rivers. The specific epithet (walkeri) honours the collector of the type specimens.

== Distribution and habitat ==
Cactus bossiaea grows in mallee, low open woodland, creek beds and rocky outcrops and occurs in Western Australia, South Australia, Victoria and New South Wales. It is found from near Shark Bay in Western Australia, through the south-west of the state to southern South Australia, the Murray River and Wyperfeld National Park in Victoria, and to inland New South Wales. The species is rare in Victoria, where it is listed as "endangered" under the Victorian Government Flora and Fauna Guarantee Act 1988.

== Ecology ==
The pendent flowers and the unusual shape of the flower parts of B. walkeri suggest that it is bird-pollinated. Honeyeaters and blue wrens have been observed visiting the flowers.

== Reproduction ==
The 2cm flowers are produced between July and November. They will often flower after seed has set to take full advantage of additional rainfall after a dry period. The fruit is a hairless, flattened 6cm by 1cm pod that contains brown seeds. The pods begin green but mature to brown, the seeds become ripe usually 2 to 3 months after flowering has finished. Then on a hot day the pods will explode to disperse the seed several metres. Birds are the primary pollinators, but small animals and insects also contribute.

== Uses ==
=== Use in horticulture ===
This species is described as "decorative" and can be propagated from seed or from cuttings. It can be grown in full sun or part shade, is drought and frost tolerant but needs relatively dry, well-drained soil.

=== Other uses ===
Bossiaea walkeri produces a very distinct honey, although it appears to have no pastoral value.
