= Eucarya =

Eucarya may refer to:

- Eukaryotes, organisms whose cells contain a nucleus and complex structures inside the membranes.
- Eucarya, a formerly recognized genus of flowering plants that is now considered to be part of the genus Santalum.
