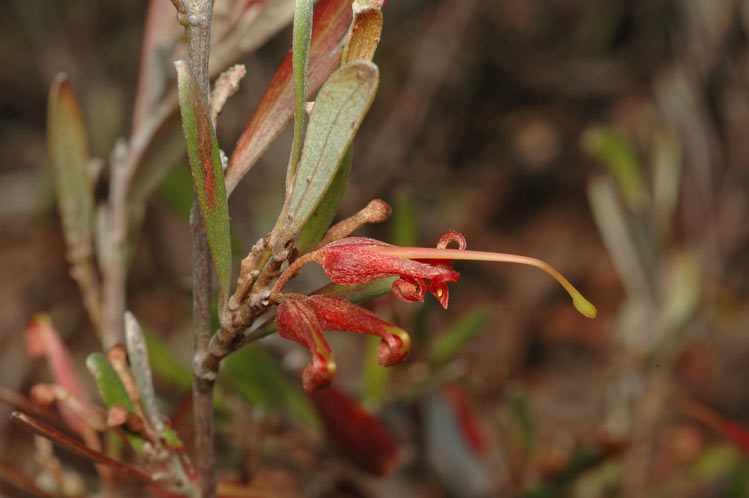
- In the Australian National Botanic Gardens

Scientific classification
- Kingdom: Plantae
- Clade: Tracheophytes
- Clade: Angiosperms
- Clade: Eudicots
- Order: Proteales
- Family: Proteaceae
- Genus: Grevillea
- Species: G. oligantha

Binomial name
- Grevillea oligantha F.Muell.

= Grevillea oligantha =

Species of shrub endemic to Western Australia

Grevillea oligantha is a species of flowering plant in the family Proteaceae and is endemic to southern Western Australia. It is dense shrub with many erect branches, egg-shaped, lance-shaped or linear leaves, and groups of up to six brownish-yellow, orange or reddish-brown flowers with a pale yellow to reddish style.

== Description ==
Grevillea oligantha is a shrub that typically grows to a height of 0.5–2.5 m (1 ft 8 in – 8 ft 2 in) and has many erect branches. Its leaves are egg-shaped or lance-shaped with the narrower end towards the base, or linear, 12–80 mm (0.47–3.15 in) long and 1–8 mm (0.039–0.315 in) wide. The edges of the leaves are curved downwards and the lower surface is silky-hairy. The flowers are arranged singly or in groups of up to 6 in leaf axils or on the ends of short side branches on a rachis 0.4–2.5 mm (0.016–0.098 in) long, and are brownish-yellow, orange or reddish-brown, the pistil 18–22.5 mm (0.71–0.89 in) long and the style pale yellow to reddish with a green tip. Flowering mainly occurs from May to November, and the fruit is a glabrous oval to elliptic follicle 10.5–12.5 mm (0.41–0.49 in) long.

== Taxonomy ==
Grevillea oligntha was first formally described in 1868 by Ferdinand von Mueller in Fragmenta Phytographiae Australiae from specimens collected by George Maxwell near the Phillips River. The specific epithet (oligantha) means "few-flowered".

== Distribution and habitat ==
Grevillea oligantha grows in heath, tall shrubland and mallee woodland between Balladonia, Cape Arid, Bremer Bay and parts of the Stirling Range National Park in the Coolgardie, Esperance Plains and Mallee bioregions of southern Western Australia.

== Conservation status ==
This grevillea is listed as "not threatened", by the Western Australian Government Department of Biodiversity, Conservation and Attractions.

== See also ==
- List of Grevillea species
