= Grevillea decipiens =

Conservation status
- Least Concern (IUCN 3.1)

Scientific classification
- Kingdom: Plantae
- Clade: Tracheophytes
- Clade: Angiosperms
- Clade: Eudicots
- Order: Proteales
- Family: Proteaceae
- Genus: Grevillea
- Species: G. decipiens

Binomial name
- Grevillea decipiens McGill.

Species of shrub native to Western Australia

Grevillea decipiens is a species of flowering plant in the family Proteaceae and is endemic to the south of Western Australia. It is a dense, compact shrub with erect branches, linear leaves and small groups of red flowers with a pale orange to red style.

== Description ==
Grevillea decipiens is a dense, compact shrub that typically grows to a height of up to 1.5 m (4 ft 11 in) and has erect branches. Its leaves are linear, 25–90 mm (0.98–3.54 in) long and 1.0–1.6 mm (0.039–0.063 in) wide with the edges rolled under, enclosing most of the lower surface. The flowers are usually arranged singly or in groups of up to six in leaf axils and are red with an orange to red style with a green tip, the pistil 17–20.5 mm (0.67–0.81 in) long. Flowering occurs from May to August and the fruit is a follicle 10.0–11.5 mm (0.39–0.45 in) long and 3.0–4.5 mm (0.12–0.18 in) wide.

== Taxonomy ==
Grevillea decipiens was first formally described in 1986 by Donald McGillivray in his book New names in Grevillea (Proteaceae) from specimens collected by Alex George in 1969. The specific epithet (decipiens) means "deceiving", referring to this species' similarity to Grevillea oligantha.

== Distribution and habitat ==
This grevillea grows in shrubland and mallee woodland between Ongerup and Frank Hann National Park in the Esperance Plains and Mallee biogeographic regions of southern Western Australia.

== Conservation status ==
Grevillea decipiens is listed as least concern on the IUCN Red List of Threatened Species, and as not threatened by the Western Australian Government Department of Parks and Wildlife.
