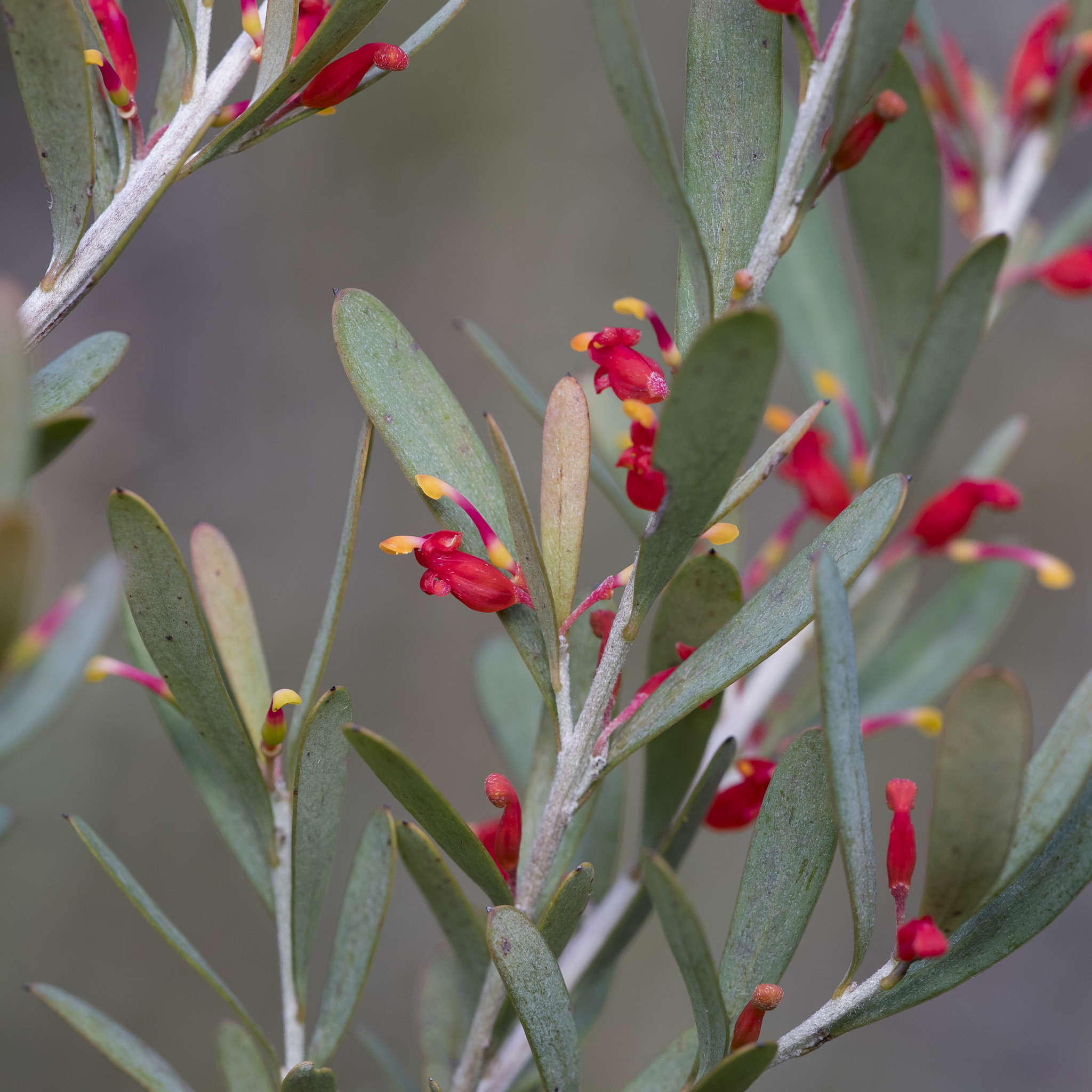
- In Lincoln National Park

Scientific classification
- Kingdom: Plantae
- Clade: Tracheophytes
- Clade: Angiosperms
- Clade: Eudicots
- Order: Proteales
- Family: Proteaceae
- Genus: Grevillea
- Species: G. pauciflora

Binomial name
- Grevillea pauciflora R.Br.

= Grevillea pauciflora =

Species of shrub endemic to Western Australia

Grevillea pauciflora, commonly known as the few-flowered grevillea, or as Port Lincoln grevillea in South Australia, is a species of flowering plant in the family Proteaceae and is endemic to the south of continental Australia. It is an erect to straggly or spreading shrub with linear to narrowly wedge-shaped leaves and red or orange flowers with a red or orange style.

== Description ==
Grevillea pauciflora is an erect to straggly or spreading shrub that typically grows to a height of 0.2–2 m (7.9 in – 6 ft 6.7 in). Its leaves are linear or narrowly wedge-shaped to egg-shaped with the narrower end towards the base, mostly 20–50 mm (0.79–1.97 in) long and 2.5–8 mm (0.098–0.315 in) wide with the edges turned down or rolled, the lower surface sometimes silky hairy. The flowers are arranged singly or in groups of up to four, sometimes to ten, on the ends of branches or in leaf axils on a rachis 0.2–1.5 mm (0.0079–0.0591 in) long. The flowers are red or orange with a red or orange style, the pistil 7–10.5 mm (0.28–0.41 in) long. Flowering time varies with subspecies and the fruit is a glabrous, elliptic follicle 10–14 mm (0.39–0.55 in) long.

== Taxonomy ==
Grevillea pauciflora was first formally described in 1810 by Robert Brown in Transactions of the Linnean Society of London. The specific epithet (pauciflora) means "few-flowered". The specific epithet, pauciflora, refers to the Latin term for 'few flowered'.

In 1986, Donald McGillivray described two subspecies in New Names in Grevillea (Proteaceae) and in 1996 William Robert Barker described a third subspecies in the Journal of the Adelaide Botanic Gardens, and the names are accepted by the Australian Plant Census:

- Grevillea pauciflora subsp. leptophylla W.R.Barker is a shrub up to 1 m (3 ft 3 in) high with silky-hairy branchlets, thread-like leaves 20–40 mm (0.79–1.57 in) long, the edges rolled under and enclosing the lower surface, and red flowers with a yellow-tipped style from August to October.
- Grevillea pauciflora R.Br. subsp. pauciflora is a shrub up to 1 m (3 ft 3 in) high with silky-hairy branchlets, egg-shaped to linear leaves 12–55 mm (0.47–2.17 in) long, the lower surface sometimes silky-hairy, and orange to bright red flowers with a red, yellow-tipped style, mainly from June to October.
- Grevillea pauciflora subsp. psilophylla McGill. is a shrub 1.5–2 m (4 ft 11 in – 6 ft 7 in) high with silky-hairy, ridged branchlets, narrowly wedge-shaped to narrowly egg-shaped leaves with the narrower end towards the base, 20–50 mm (0.79–1.97 in) long, the lower surface glabrous, and red flowers with a red, yellow-tipped style, from May to June or from September to December.
- Grevillea pauciflora subsp. saxatilis McGill. is a spindly shrub up to 70 cm (28 in) high with silky- to woolly-hairy, ridged branchlets, narrowly egg-shaped leaves with the narrower end towards the base, mostly 40–80 mm (1.6–3.1 in) long, the edges rolled under, enclosing the lower surface, and red flowers with an orange-tipped style, mainly in July and August.

== Distribution and habitat ==
Grevillea pauciflora grows in sandy soil. Subspecies leptophylla is only known on the Eyre Peninsula in South Australia, where it is found north and north-west of Cummins, but subsp. pauciflora is widespread on the Eyre and Yorke Peninsulas and on Kangaroo Island. Subspecies psilophylla is found in near-coastal areas of Western Australia from east of Esperance to Point Malcolm near Israelite Bay and subspecies saxatilis only grows in Cape Arid National Park.

== See also ==
- List of Grevillea species
