= Glenn Wightman =

Australian ethnobiologist

Glenn Mitchell Wightman PSM (born 1961) is an ethnobotanist working for the Department of Environment Parks and Water Security, in Palmerston. He works closely with various aboriginal language groups to document plant and animal names and their usage in the culture. In doing so, he has been helping to preserve some 48 Aboriginal languages in collaboration with some 252 Indigenous co-authors. He has also done biocultural work in Indonesia.

Wightman was born in 1961 at Leongatha, Victoria, and graduated from Monash University in 1982 with a BSc, majoring in botany and geology.

In 2008 he curated Replant: A New Generation of Botanical Art, an exhibition held at the Royal Botanic Gardens in Sydney of illustrations of water lilies by six indigenous and non-indigenous artists in collaboration with the Nauiyu community in the Northern Territory. The exhibition of prints was displayed in the Cowra Regional Art Gallery in central New South Wales in 2011.

He has published one plant name: Atalaya brevialata Cowie & Wightman.

The standard author abbreviation Wightman is used to indicate this person as the author when citing a botanical name.

== Honours and recognition ==
In the Australia Day Honours of 2011, he was awarded the Public Service Medal for "For outstanding public service to the maintenance of Indigenous languages and culture in the Northern Territory, particularly Indigenous biological knowledge of plants, animals and landscapes".

In 2021 he won the Northern Territory's Natural Resource Management's lifetime achievement award.
