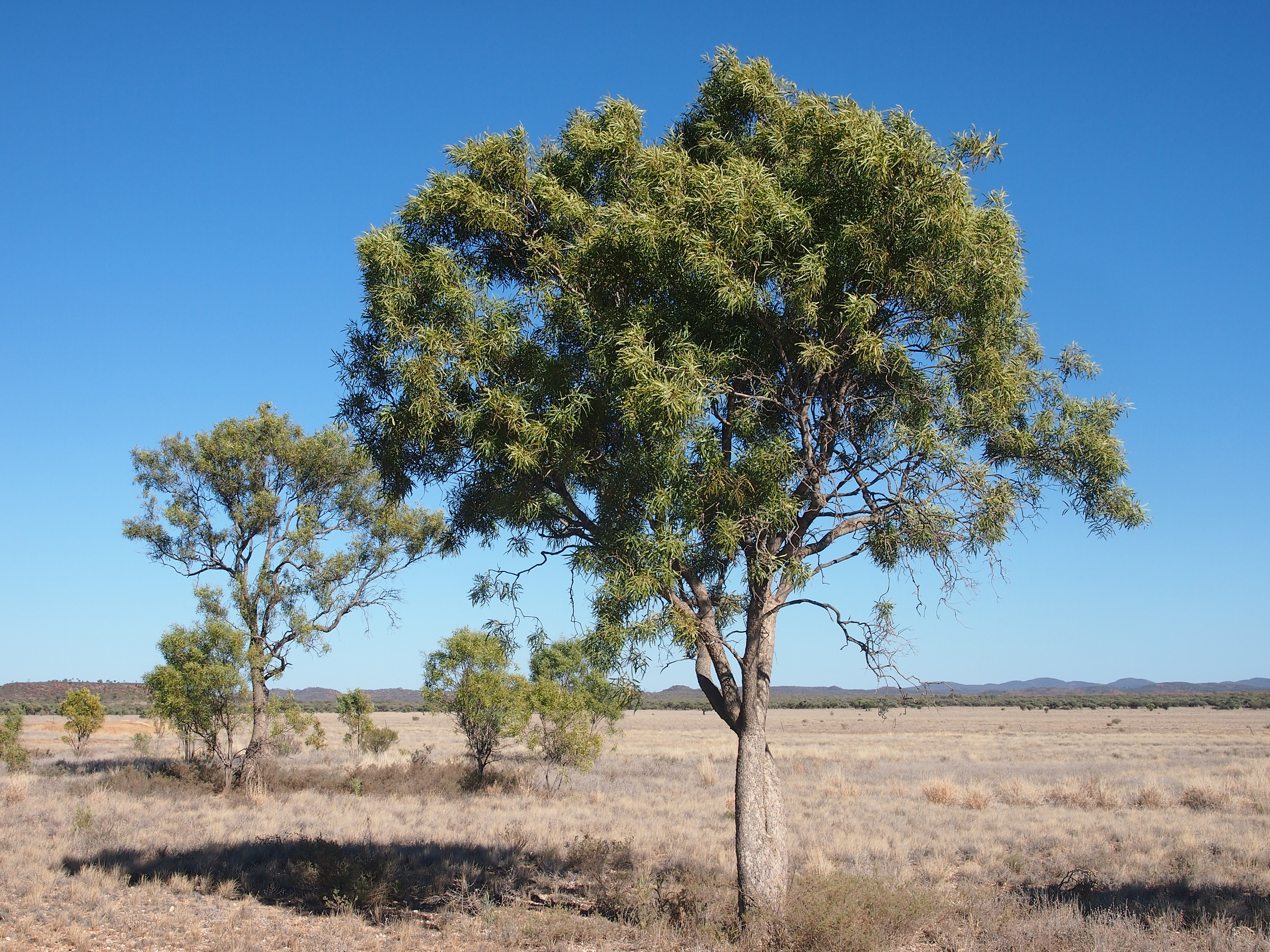

Scientific classification
- Kingdom: Plantae
- Clade: Tracheophytes
- Clade: Angiosperms
- Clade: Eudicots
- Clade: Rosids
- Order: Sapindales
- Family: Sapindaceae
- Genus: Atalaya
- Species: A. hemiglauca

Binomial name
- Atalaya hemiglauca (F.Muell.) F.Muell. ex Benth.

= Atalaya hemiglauca =

Species of plant

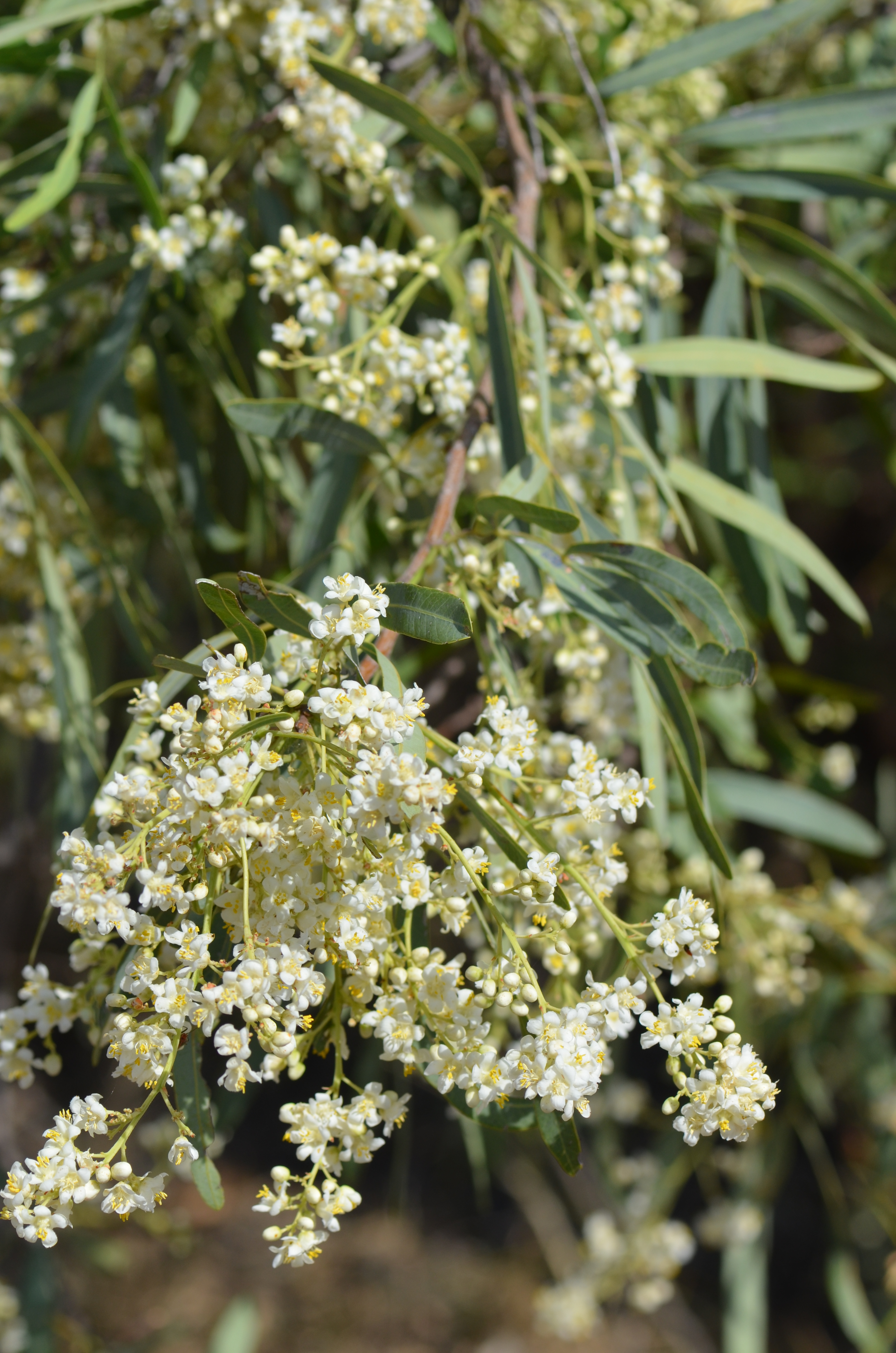

Atalaya hemiglauca, commonly known as whitewood or cattle bush, is a species of plant in the soapberry (Sapindaceae) family. It is native to northern and inland Australia where it occurs from Western Australia through the Northern Territory and South Australia to Queensland and northern New South Wales.

== Description ==
It grows as a shrub or small tree to 6 m, sometimes 10 m, high, with pale grey bark. It bears clusters of cream flowers from May to October. Its fruits are samaras, 20–40 mm long. It is drought tolerant, suckers freely and provides shade for livestock.

== Taxonomy ==
Atalaya hemiglauca is described by (F.Muell.) F.Muell. ex Benth. in Flora Australiensis: a description... 1: 463, in 1863. Its basionym is Thouinia hemiglauca F.Muell.

== Distribution and habitat ==
It occurs on sandy and clayey soils, on flood plains, sandy ridges and pindan. In Western Australia it is found in the Central Kimberley, Dampierland, Northern Kimberley, Ord Victoria Plain and Victoria Bonaparte IBRA bioregions. A map showing where it has been collected is given by the Australian Virtual Herbarium.

== Uses ==
Arlperrampwe (Arrernte) tree gum is found on the trunk and branches of Atalaya hemiglauca in big globs. Some runs down the tree as it hangs there. For bushfood it is collected and made into a lump, kneaded until soft, and is then eaten.
