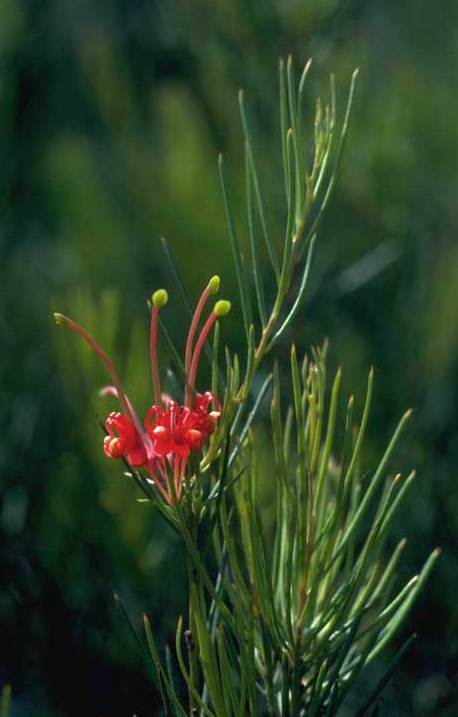

Conservation status
- Least Concern (IUCN 3.1)

Scientific classification
- Kingdom: Plantae
- Clade: Embryophytes
- Clade: Tracheophytes
- Clade: Spermatophytes
- Clade: Angiosperms
- Clade: Eudicots
- Order: Proteales
- Family: Proteaceae
- Genus: Grevillea
- Species: G. acuaria

Binomial name
- Grevillea acuaria F.Muell. ex Benth.

Synonyms
- Grevillea aculeolata S.Moore; Grevillea aculeolata S.Moore var. aculeolata; Grevillea aculeolata var. longifolia S.Moore; Grevillea arida C.A.Gardner

= Grevillea acuaria =

Species of shrub endemic to Western Australia

Grevillea acuaria is a species of flowering plant in the family Proteaceae and is endemic to the south-west of Western Australia. It is a rounded, bushy to erect shrub with spreading linear to narrowly elliptic leaves and red flowers arranged in small clusters.

== Description ==
Grevillea acuaria is a rounded, bushy to erect shrub that typically grows to a height of 0.2–1.5 m (7.9 in – 4 ft 11.1 in). Its leaves are mostly linear to cylindrical, 5–30 mm (0.20–1.18 in) long and 0.5–3.5 mm (0.020–0.138 in) wide with the edges turned down or rolled under. The flowers are usually arranged in groups of four to six on the ends of branches or in leaf axils on a flowering stem less than 1 mm (0.039 in) long, and are scarlet to deep burgundy, the style green or red, often with a green tip. Each flower is on a pedicel 4–5 mm (0.16–0.20 in) long, and the pistil is 14–21 mm (0.55–0.83 in) long. Flowering mainly occurs from May to October and the fruit is an oval follicle 8–11 mm (0.31–0.43 in) long.

== Taxonomy ==
Grevillea acuaria was first formally described in 1870 by George Bentham from an unpublished manuscript by Ferdinand von Mueller and the description was published in Flora Australiensis from material collected by James Drummond. The specific epithet (acuaria) means "possessing needles".

== Distribution and habitat ==
This grevillea grows in a wide variety of habitats, often in winter-wet situations and is widespread in the Avon Wheatbelt, Coolgardie, Esperance Plains, Great Victoria Desert, Mallee, Murchison, Nullarbor and Yalgoo biogeographic regions of Western Australia.

== Conservation status ==
Grevillea acuaria is listed as least concern on the IUCN Red List of Threatened Species. It is a widespread, common species with a stable population and no known threats, either current or in the near future.
