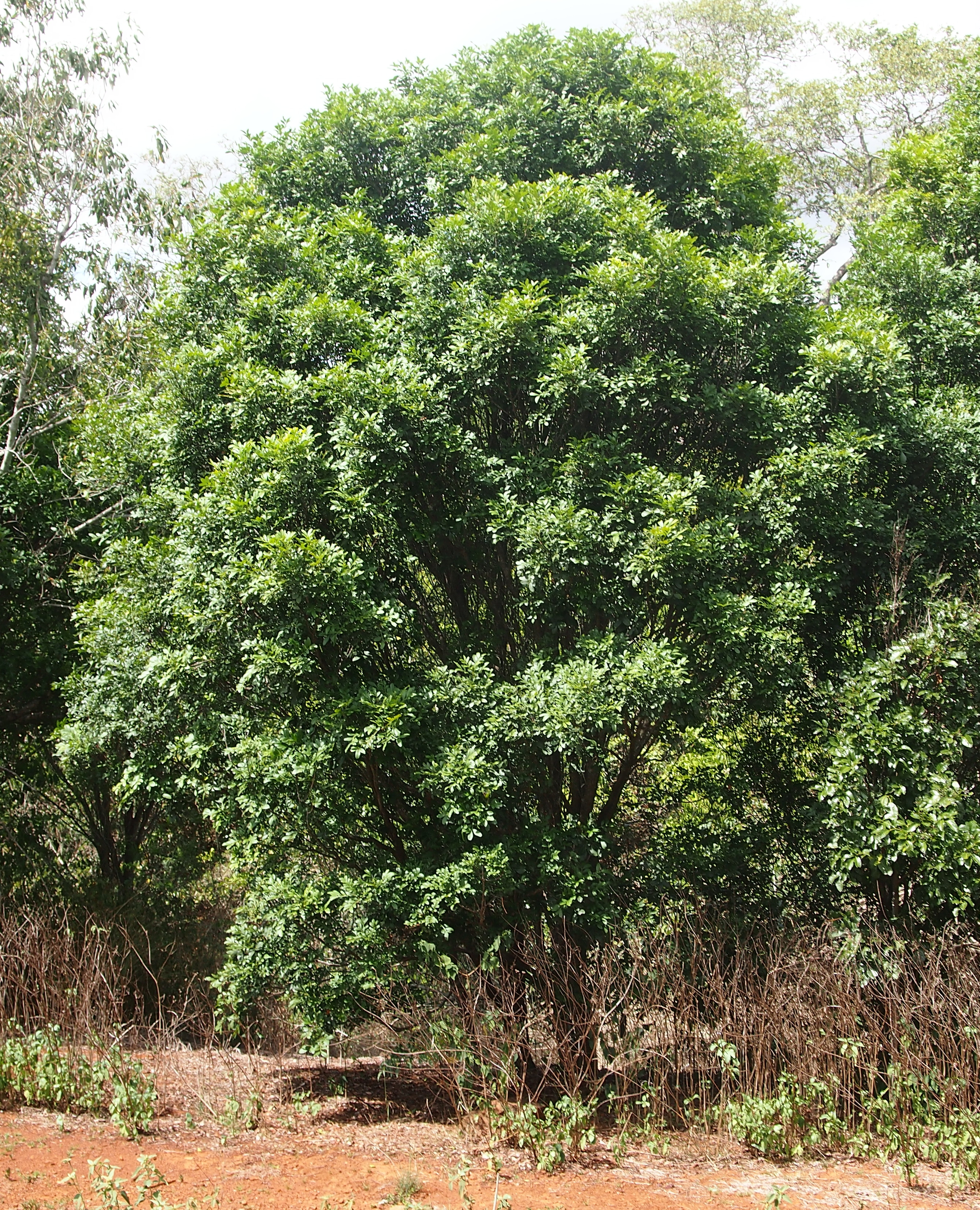
- Atalaya salicifolia (type species) habit (above), foliage (below)
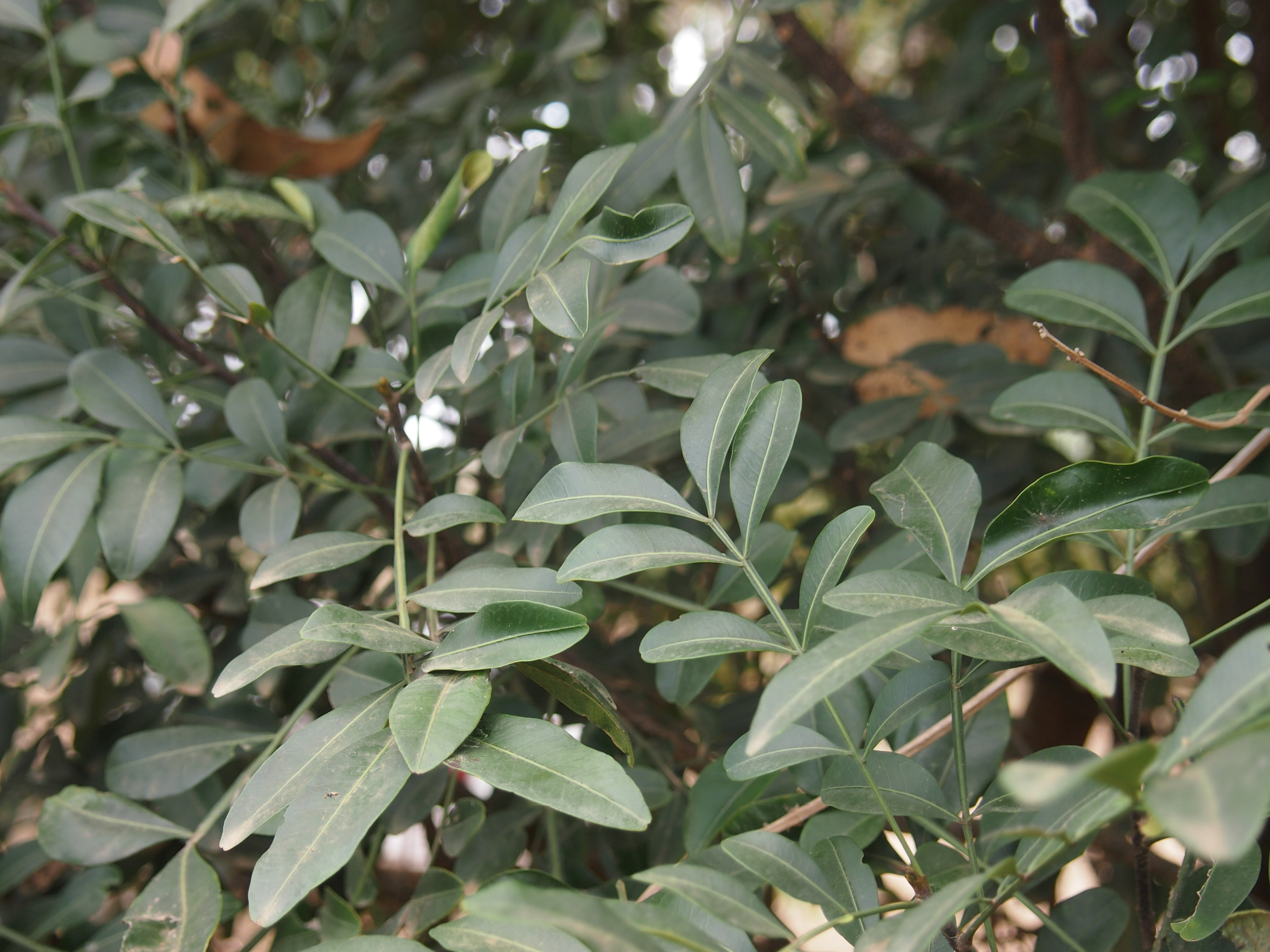

Scientific classification
- Kingdom: Plantae
- Clade: Embryophytes
- Clade: Tracheophytes
- Clade: Angiosperms
- Clade: Eudicots
- Clade: Rosids
- Order: Sapindales
- Family: Sapindaceae
- Subfamily: Sapindoideae
- Genus: Atalaya; Blume

Type species
- Atalaya salicifolia (A.DC.) Blume

Species
- See text

= Atalaya (plant) =

Genus of plants

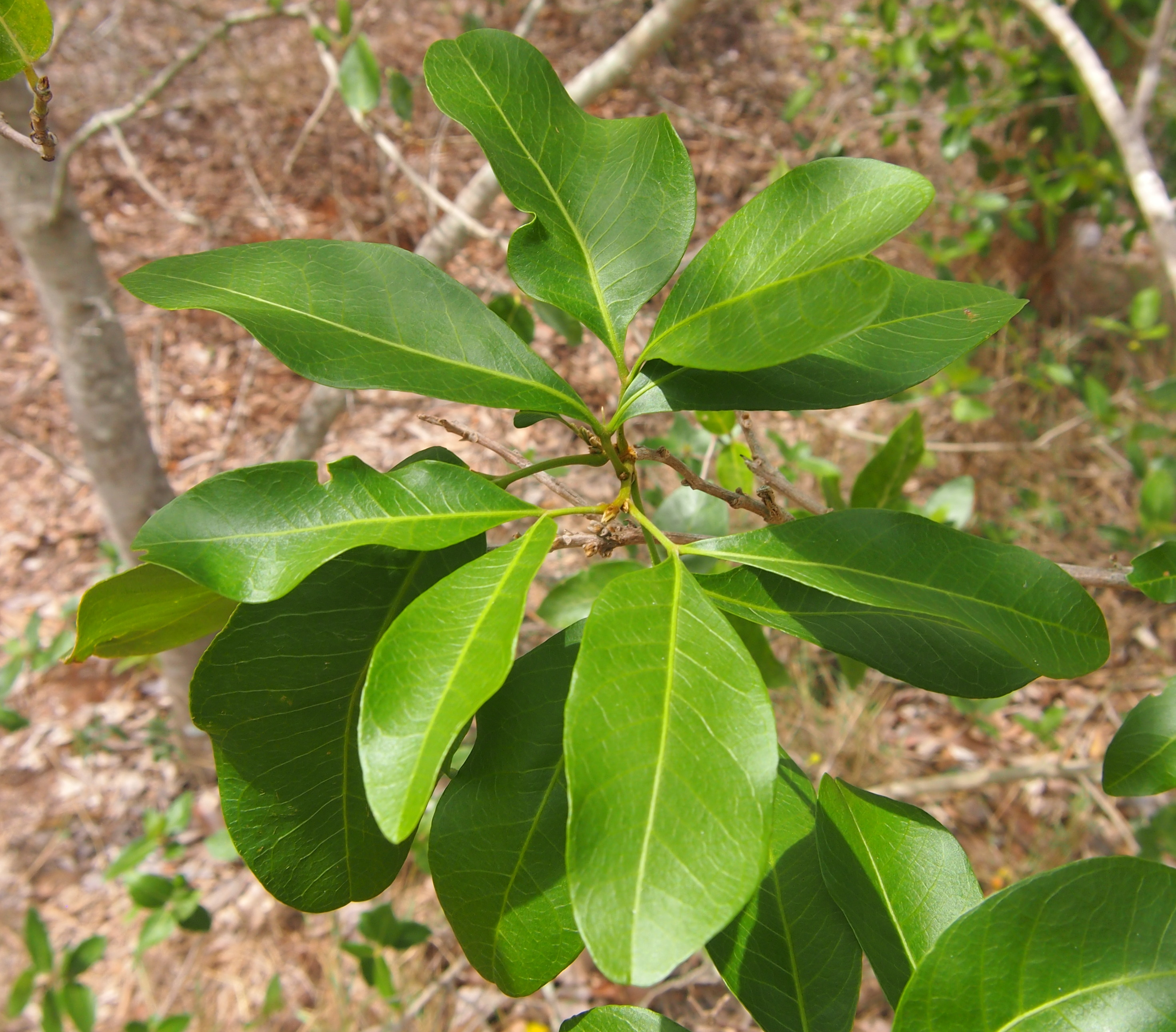
Atalaya calcicola foliage

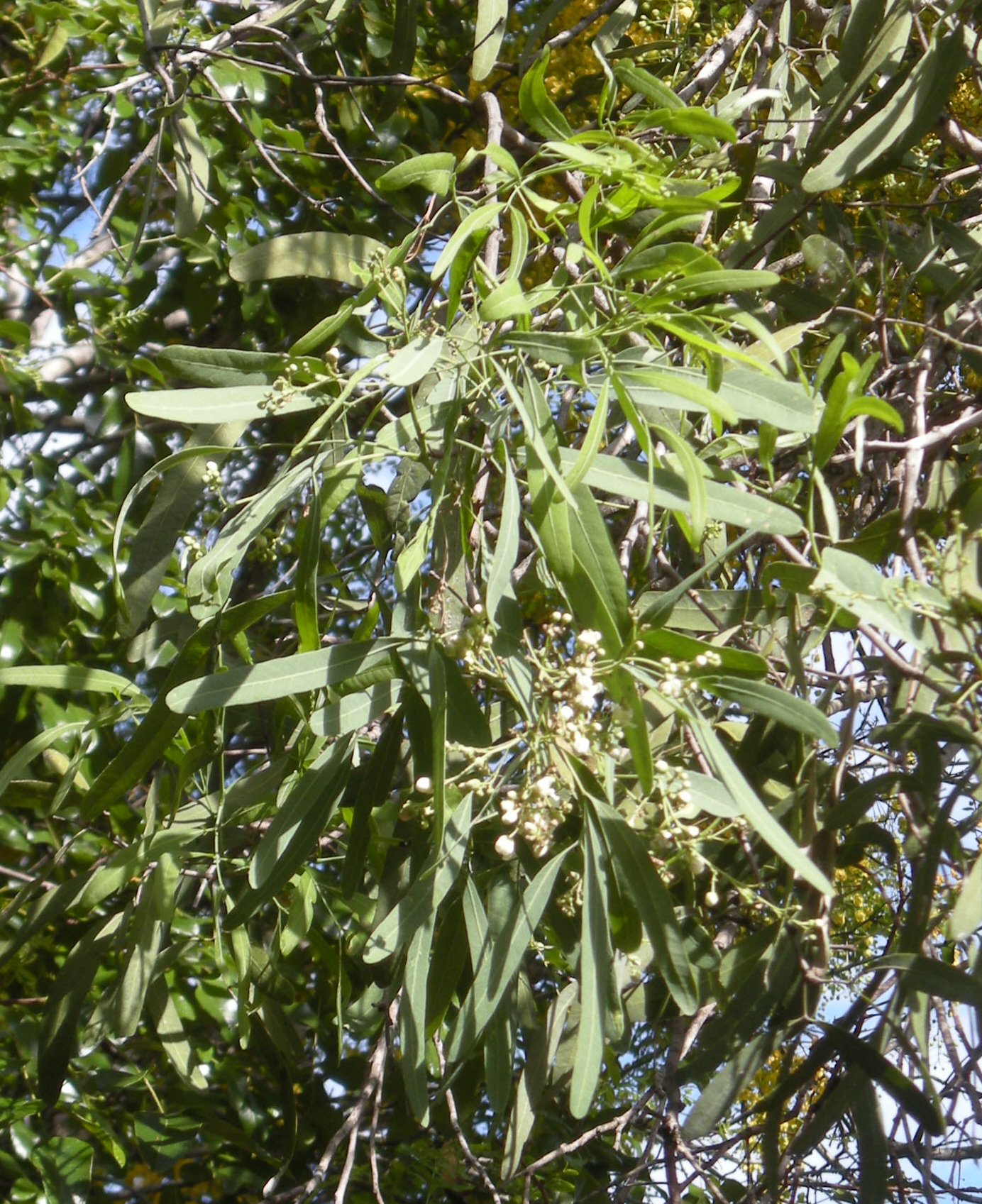
Atalaya hemiglauca foliage and flowers, Rockhampton, Queensland

Atalaya is a genus of eighteen species of trees and shrubs of the plant family Sapindaceae. As of 2013 fourteen species grow naturally in Australia and in neighbouring New Guinea only one endemic species is known to science. Three species are known growing naturally in southern Africa, including two species endemic to South Africa and one species in South Africa, Eswatini and Mozambique.

One species, A. salicifolia, which grows in Australia, has a wider distribution through nearby Timor and westwards through some more of the Lesser Sunda Islands (Indonesia). This species has the widest distribution of all and is the type species—the first to have a formal scientific name, description and represent the genus.

In biodiversity-rich New Guinea as of 2013, many areas do not have complete formal scientific botanical survey. In this context, science seems to have only recorded the knowledge of A. papuana growing there naturally as the putative sole endemic species. Regionally widespread A. salicifolia does not seem to have scientific records from New Guinea even though science has recorded it many times in the regions of northern Australia and Timor nearest to southern and western New Guinea.

== Biogeography, habitats and conservation ==
In mainland Australia's warmer places, twelve species are known by published formal botanical descriptions—trees, shrubs and subshrubs, growing naturally in rainforests, brigalow scrubs, monsoon forests (rainforests in a climate of a summer wet season and cool dry season, with drought deciduous trees), tropical savannas, coastal scrubs, some arid desert areas and in similar vegetation associations further south than the tropics. Certain species particularly occur in Australia's restricted areas of naturally high nutrient soil types, for instances, soils built from limestone or basalt parent materials. Areas of more fertile soils than average Australian soils, have not surprisingly had their native vegetation associations preferentially destroyed for converting the soils to European–Australian agricultural methods. This has disproportionately brought about the decline of the specialised native plants of these soils.

Two Australian species found in Queensland have herbarium specimen collections and published informal descriptions, but are awaiting formal publication of scientific descriptions and names. Collectively, the fourteen known Australian species range throughout warmer parts of the continent, including parts of the semi-arid and arid zones, in Queensland, the Northern Territory, Western Australia, New South Wales and South Australia, except for Tasmania and Victoria where they have not been recorded. Some Australian species have very reduced, scarce or isolated known ranges and natural habitats, as of 2013. Atalaya collina Yarwun Whitewood trees, have a known range of only two very isolated populations to the west of Gladstone, Queensland, hence this species' populations have a national conservation status listing of "endangered" in the Australian government Environment Protection and Biodiversity Conservation Act 1999.

Ian D. Cowie, Glenn M. Wightman and Benjamin Stuckey formally scientifically named and described the restricted endemic, unique, Atalaya brevialata subshrub species, in their Dec 2012, scientific paper. Botanists have found this species growing naturally only in a restricted area of the Darwin region of Australia. In their formal scientific description Cowie, Wightman and Stuckey have published the species global conservation status (IUCN) of "endangered" under the following criteria "IUCN B1, 2ab (i, ii, iii, iv, v)". A. brevialata plants have the unusual and unique nature among Atalaya species of a suffruticose growing habit; meaning, in this case, a species which has evolved from an ancestral group of woody–trunked shrubs or trees into having woody growth only underground and above ground only leafy growth. They grow naturally only up to 45 cm (18 in) tall subshrubs, with the leafy above ground growth that dies back each dry season to the underground woody rootstocks.

In South Africa three species grow naturally. The scarcity of A. natalensis trees and their restricted range has received the global conservation status (IUCN) of "vulnerable D2". A. capensis has a global conservation status (IUCN) listing also, of "Lower Risk / conservation dependent" as of December 2013.

In Papua New Guinea A. papuana grows naturally in coast monsoon dune scrub (coastal rainforests on dune soils that become seasonally dry, with deciduous trees), tropical savanna forests and in regenerating areas of regularly burning swamp forests and rainforests.

== Naming and classification ==
European science formally named and described the genus Atalaya in 1847, authored by Carl L. Blume, with the Timor type specimen of the species Atalaya salicifolia.

Two species were formally described in 1965 by Pieter W. Leenhouts in preparations for treatment of the family Sapindaceae in Flora Malesiana.In 1981, 1985 and 1991, Sally T. Reynolds scientifically described several new Australian species in two scientific journal articles and in her writing of the Atalaya section of the series Flora of Australia.

== Species ==
As of November 2025, Plants of the World Online accepted the following species:

- Atalaya alata (Sim) H.M.L.Forbes – KwaZulu-Natal, Limpopo and Mpumalanga provinces of South Africa, Eswatini and Mozambique
- Atalaya angustifolia S.T.Reynolds – Queensland, Australia
- Atalaya australiana Leenh. – Queensland, Australia
- Atalaya brevialata Cowie & Wightman – Northern Territory endemic, Australia
- Atalaya calcicola S.T.Reynolds – Queensland, Australia
- Atalaya capensis R.A.Dyer – South Africa endemic
- Atalaya collina S.T.Reynolds – Queensland, Australia
- Atalaya hemiglauca (F.Muell.) F.Muell. ex Benth. – WA, SA, Qld, NSW, NT, Australia
- Atalaya multiflora Benth. – Qld, NSW, Australia
- Atalaya natalensis R.A.Dyer – South Africa endemic
- Atalaya oligoclada S.T.Reynolds – Queensland, Australia
- Atalaya papuana (Radlk.) Leenh. – SE New Guinea
- Atalaya rigida S.T.Reynolds – Queensland, Australia
- Atalaya salicifolia (A.DC.) Blume – WA, NT, Qld, NSW, Australia; Timor, Sumbawa, Sumba, Leti, Malesia
- Atalaya sericopetala S.T.Reynolds – Queensland, Australia
- Atalaya variifolia (F.Muell.) F.Muell. ex Benth. – WA, NT, Qld, Australia

Species provisionally named, described and accepted according to the authoritative Australian Plant Name Index as of June 2014 while awaiting formal publication:

- Atalaya sp. Chillagoe (L.J.Webb+ 13226) Qld Herbarium (2006) – Queensland, Australia
- Atalaya sp. Scawfell Island (G.N.Batianoff+ 6098) Qld Herbarium (2006) – Queensland, Australia
