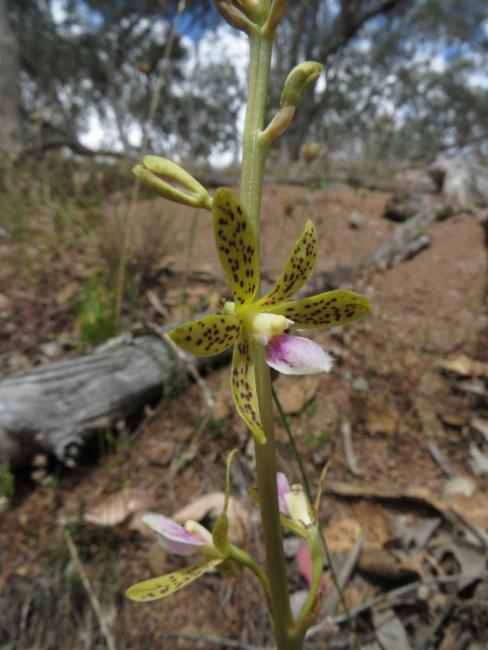
- Dipodium hamiltonianum in East Gippsland

Scientific classification
- Kingdom: Plantae
- Clade: Tracheophytes
- Clade: Angiosperms
- Clade: Monocots
- Order: Asparagales
- Family: Orchidaceae
- Subfamily: Epidendroideae
- Genus: Dipodium
- Species: D. hamiltonianum

Binomial name
- Dipodium hamiltonianum F.M.Bailey

= Dipodium hamiltonianum =

Yellow hyacinth-orchid

Species of orchid

Dipodium hamiltonianum, commonly known as yellow hyacinth-orchid, is a leafless mycoheterotroph orchid that is endemic to eastern Australia. It has up to twenty five greenish flowers with dark red spots on a tall flowering stem.

== Description ==
For most of the year, D. hamiltonianum plants are dormant and have no above-ground presence. Below the ground lie fleshy roots. Flower spikes between 40 and 80 cm in height appear between November and March in the species' native range. These racemose inflorescences have 3 to 25 yellow or greenish-yellow fleshy flowers with red to purple spots. The three-lobed forward-projecting labellum is white with purple markings and has a tuft of white hairs. Tubers usually produce only a single flower spike. Flower spikes from an individual plant may appear as infrequently as once in a five-year period.

== Taxonomy ==
The species was formally described by Queensland Colonial Botanist Frederick Manson Bailey in 1881 based on plant material collected from Stradbroke Island and Peel Island near Brisbane in Queensland.

In 1913, Bailey demoted the species, treating it as a subspecies of Dipodium punctatum. In 1944, botanist and orchid specialist Herman Rupp reinstated the species. It is named for James Hamilton, superintendent of the Benevolent Asylum in Dunwich on Stradbroke Island who collected specimens for Bailey.

== Distribution and habitat ==
The species occurs from central Queensland southwards through New South Wales and the Australian Capital Territory to eastern Victoria. Its altitudinal range is sea level to 800 metres AHD

=== Queensland ===
In Queensland it occurs southwards from the Theodore region. In tropical areas the habitat is recorded as grassy streamside areas, while in coastal areas they are found in scrub and heath. At Noosa Heads it has been observed in wallum woodland and dry heathland.

=== New South Wales ===
In New South Wales the species is recorded on dry western slopes on acidic sandy soils, as far west as the Parkes district. It is found on sandy soils at the southern end of Seven Mile Beach National Park on the south coast. It also recorded in the Australian Capital Territory.

=== Victoria ===
Seven populations have been recorded in low, open forest in north-eastern Victoria, usually among granite boulders. Four of these are in the Beechworth area, one in Burrowa-Pine Mountain National Park, one in Chiltern Regional Park and another on private land near Chesney Vale. Associated tree species in the Beechworth area include red stringybark (Eucalyptus macrorhyncha), red box (Eucalyptus polyanthemos), Blakely's red gum (Eucalyptus blakelyi) and black cypress-pine (Callitris endlicheri). Associated shrub species at Chiltern and Chesney Vale include daphne heath (Brachyloma daphnoides), hairy hop bush (Dodonaea boroniifolia), cats's claws (Grevillea alpina), erect guinea-flower (Hibbertia riparia), and flat-leaf bush-pea (Pultenaea platyphylla).

A further two populations are located near Wulgulmerang in East Gippsland, where white box (Eucalyptus albens) is the dominant species. The flowering period in Victoria is December to January. The species generally occurs on dry, well-drained north-facing slopes on granitic soils.

== Ecology ==
It is thought that the flowers may be pollinated by small native bees or wasps. Grazing wallabies (often black wallabies (Wallabia bicolor) in Victoria) may incidentally cut off flower spikes but do not consume them.

== Conservation ==
Research has been undertaken to investigate the ecological requirements of the species to assist with both its in-situ conservation as well as conservation through cultivation. The principal fungal endophytes were found to be species of two genera within the family Russulaceae, Gymnomyces and Russula. Ectomycorrhizal species in this family are commonly associated with eucalypts in Australia, however the study did not identify a preferred tree host species.

The species is listed as "threatened" in Victoria under the Flora and Fauna Guarantee Act 1988 and "Vulnerable in Victoria" on the Department of Sustainability and Environment's Advisory List of Rare Or Threatened Plants In Victoria. The population of the species in Victoria in 1997 was 105 plants, recorded in 9 locations.

== Cultivation ==
To date, the orchid has not been brought in to cultivation or successfully transplanted due to the inability to replicate its association with mycorrhizal fungi in a horticultural context.
