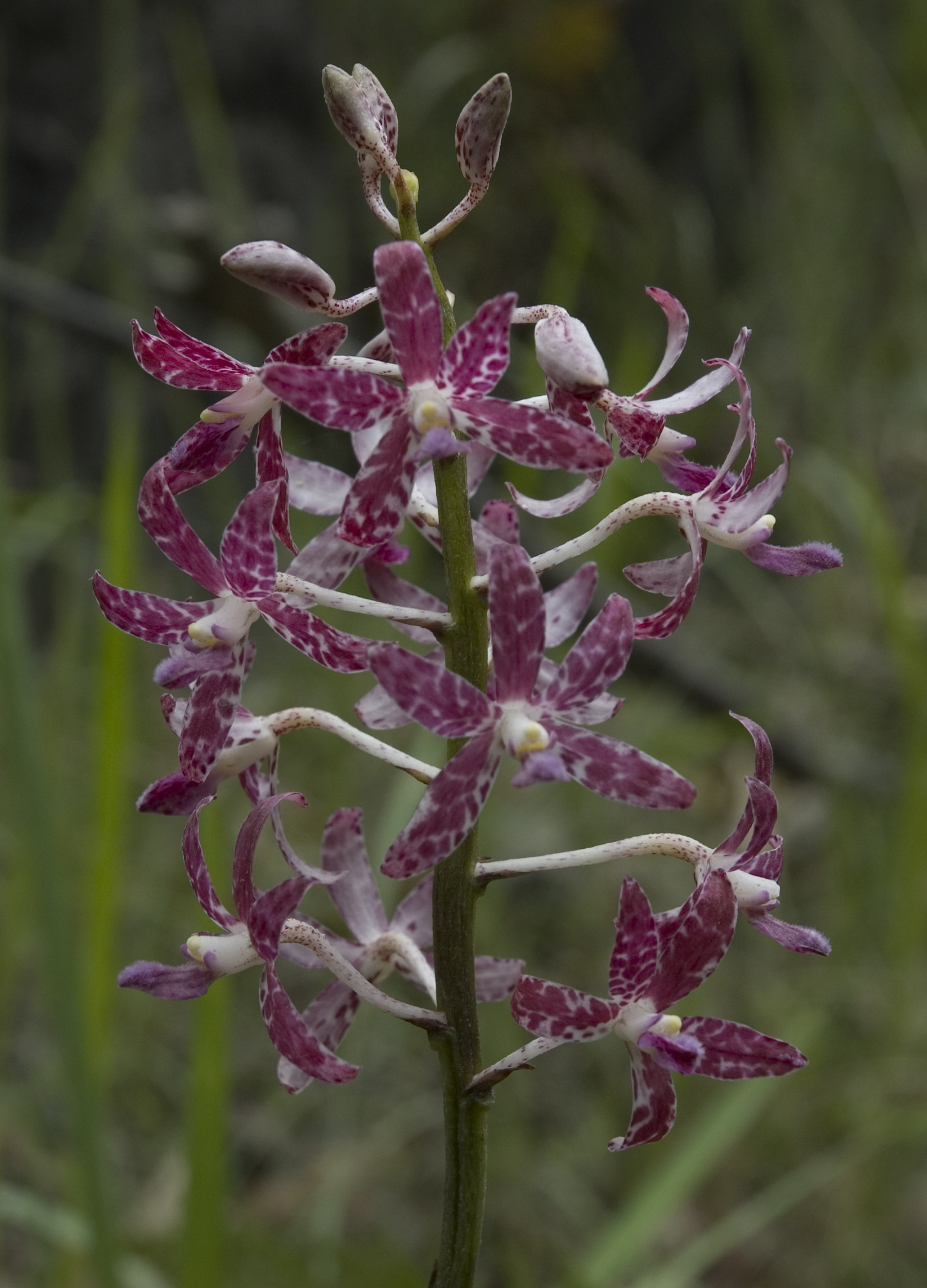
- Dipodium variegatum in Meroo National Park

Scientific classification
- Kingdom: Plantae
- Clade: Tracheophytes
- Clade: Angiosperms
- Clade: Monocots
- Order: Asparagales
- Family: Orchidaceae
- Subfamily: Epidendroideae
- Genus: Dipodium
- Species: D. variegatum

Binomial name
- Dipodium variegatum M.A.Clem. & D.L. Jones

= Dipodium variegatum =

Slender hyacinth orchid

Species of orchid

Dipodium variegatum, commonly known as the slender hyacinth-orchid, or blotched hyacinth-orchid, is a leafless mycoheterotrophic orchid that is endemic to south-eastern Australia. It forms mycorrhizal relationships with fungi of the genus Russula.

== Description ==
Dipodium variegatum is a leafless, mycoheterotrophic orchid. For most of the year, it lies dormant and has no above-ground presence; its tubers grow fleshy roots and form shoots consisting of leaf-like, sharply pointed, overlapping bracts, sometimes protruding above the ground, from which inflorescences emerge. The plant blooms in December-February, and the unbranched flowering stem, 15–60 cm (6–20 in) tall, carries 2-50 flowers. The blossoms are fleshy and cream-coloured to light pink with maroon blotches. The sepals and petals are 11–15 mm (0.43–0.59 in) long, 3–5 mm (0.12–0.20 in) wide, and slightly reflexed. The labellum is 6–15 mm (0.2–0.6 in) long and mauve to maroon. There are two diverging linear, hairy keels near the base of the labellum and a band of mauve hairs about 1 mm (0.04 in) long along its midline. The ovaries are curved with a warty surface. Along with the pedicels they are covered in conspicuous maroon spotting and together are 10–17 mm (0.39–0.67 in) long. A form with sepals and petals that are completely dark maroon occurs in some parts of its distribution.

Dipodium variegatum is similar to D. roseum, but the latter species has converging keels on the labellum and lacks the dense patch of tangled hairs near the tip of the labellum of D. variegatum. Also, of the Dipodium species that occur in Australia, D. variegatum is the only to have distinctly spotted ovaries (and sometimes pedicels).

== Taxonomy ==
Dipodium variegatum was first formally described in 1987 by Australian botanists Mark Clements and David Jones and the description was published in Proceedings of the Royal Society of Queensland. The type specimen was collected beside the Pacific Highway in Beenleigh, Queensland. The specific epithet (variegatum) is a Latin word meaning "of different sorts, particularly colors".

== Distribution and habitat ==
Dipodium variegatum occurs in eastern parts of Queensland as far north as the Mount Windsor Tableland west of Daintree National Park and in New South Wales as far west as Temora. In Victoria it is only found in the far east. It grows in a wide range of habitats from heath to wet forests.

== Ecology ==
Recovered DNA shows that this orchid forms mycorrhizal associations with Russula solaris and R. occidentalis, in keeping with the observation that many members of the genus form relationships with fungi of the family Russulaceae. The orchid has been observed to occur in close proximity to Eucalyptus species and it is thought that a relationship exists with these trees through this mycorrhizal association.

Pollination of this species, as for all species in the genus, is by native bees and wasps.

== Conservation ==
The species is listed as "rare" on the Victorian Department of Environment and Primary Industries advisory list of rare or threatened plants in Victoria.

== Cultivation ==
No leafless species of Dipodium has been sustained in cultivation due to the inability to replicate its association with mycorrhizal fungi in a horticultural context.
