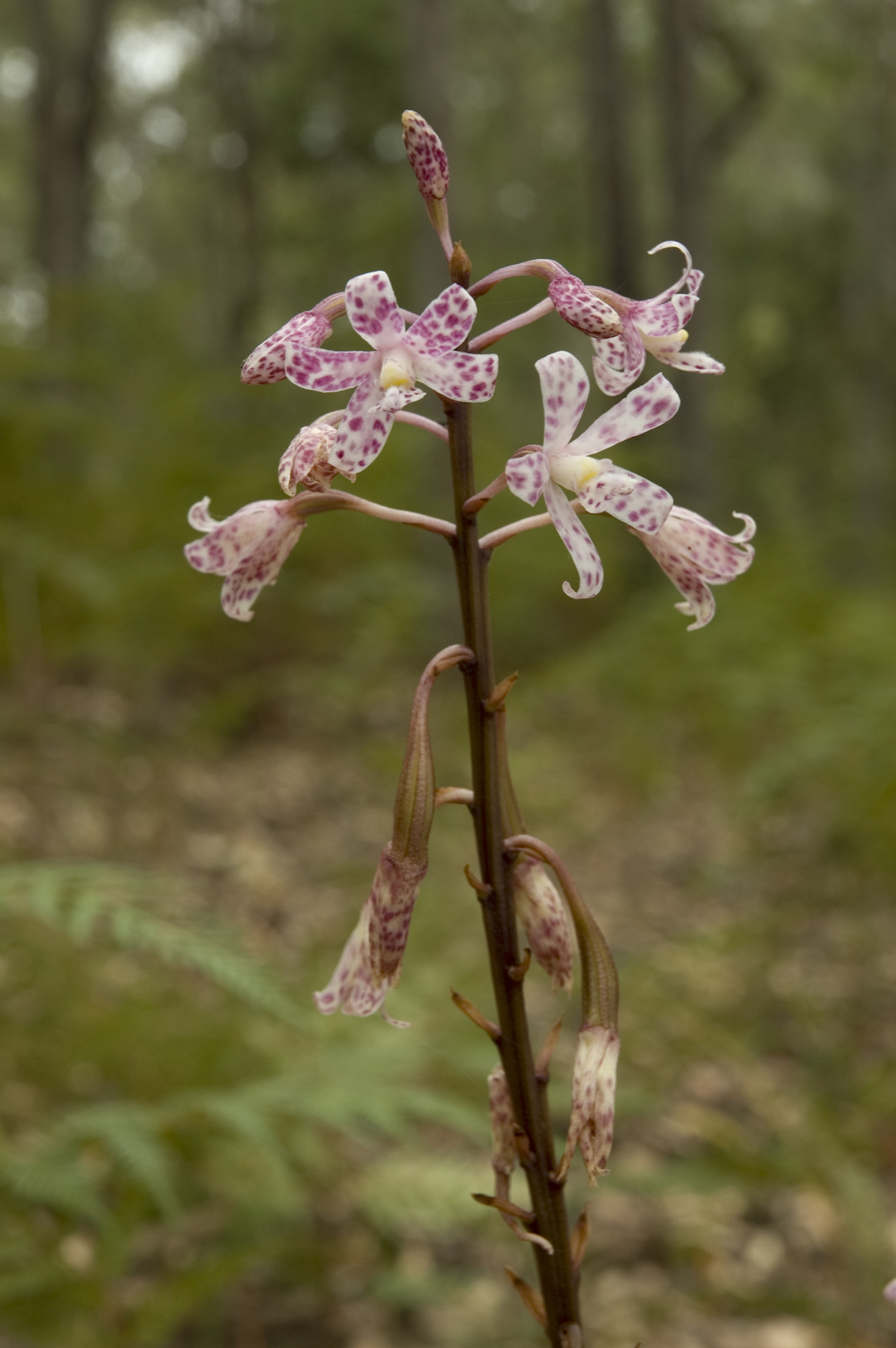
- Inflorescence; Lower Glenelg National Park, Victoria

Scientific classification
- Kingdom: Plantae
- Clade: Tracheophytes
- Clade: Angiosperms
- Clade: Monocots
- Order: Asparagales
- Family: Orchidaceae
- Subfamily: Epidendroideae
- Genus: Dipodium
- Species: D. pardalinum

Binomial name
- Dipodium pardalinum D.L. Jones

= Dipodium pardalinum =

Species of orchid

Dipodium pardalinum, commonly known as spotted hyacinth-orchid or leopard hyacinth-orchid, is a leafless hemiparasitic orchid that is endemic to south-eastern Australia.

== Description ==
For most of the year, plants are dormant and have no above-ground presence. Below the ground lie fleshy roots. Flower spikes between 40 and 90 cm in height appear between December and March in the species' native range. These racemose inflorescences have 10 to 40 white to pale pink fleshy flowers with dark red spots or blotches. The tepals are strongly recurved and the three-lobed labellum has a line of white hairs.

== Taxonomy ==
The species was formally described in 1996 by botanist David L. Jones in the journal Muelleria. The type specimen was collected in Heathmere, Victoria. The specific epithet pardalinum comes from the Greek word for leopard (pardos) alluding to the spots on the flowers.

== Distribution and habitat ==
Dipodium pardalinum occurs in western Victoria and south-eastern South Australia in open forest with an understorey of bracken or shrubs.

=== Victoria ===
It occurs in the west of the state with records from Wombat State Forest, Smythesdale, Creswick, and Heathmere to the north of Portland. A single observation has been reported from The Basin in the Dandenong Ranges.

=== South Australia ===
In South Australia, the species occurs from Naracoorte on the Victorian border to the Mount Lofty Ranges. In the Adelaide-Mount Lofty region the species is found in stringybark (Eucalyptus obliqua) woodland growing in association with Acacia myrtifolia, Xanthorrhoea semiplana ssp. tateana and Pteridium esculentum. It does not grow in proximity to other Dipodium species as is the case elsewhere. Prior to recognition as a distinct taxon, this population was regarded as a variety of Dipodium roseum.

In the Deep Creek Conservation Park at the southern end of the Fleurieu Peninsula, the species is threatened by an invasion of broom (Genista monspessulana).

== Ecology ==
Pollination of this species, as for all species in the genus, is by native bees and wasps.

== Conservation ==
The species is listed as "rare" on the Victorian Department of Environment and Primary Industries' advisory list of rare or threatened plants in Victoria and "vulnerable" in South Australia.

== Cultivation ==
No leafless species of Dipodium has been sustained in cultivation due to the inability to replicate its association with mycorrhizal fungi in a horticultural context.
