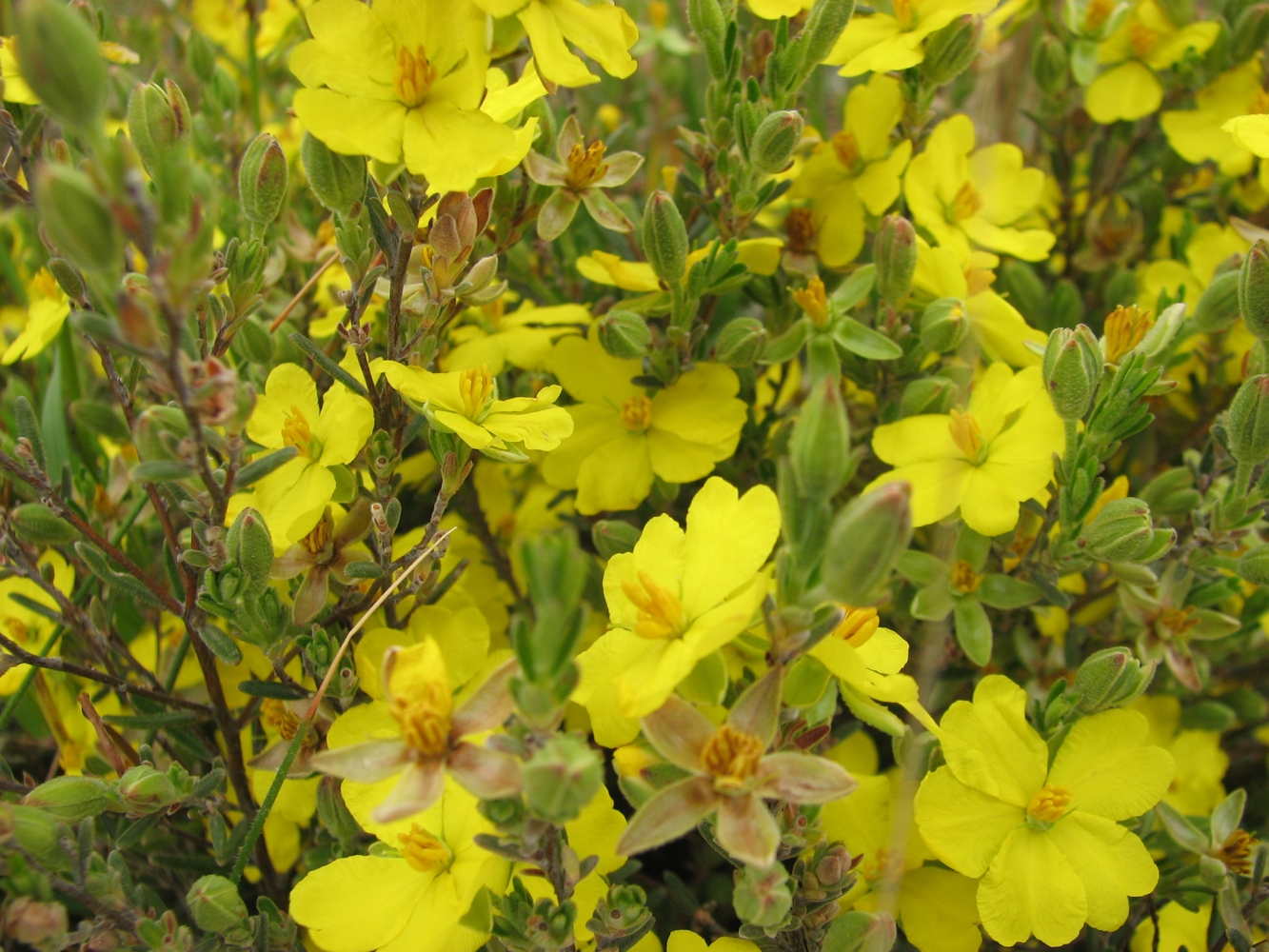

Scientific classification
- Kingdom: Plantae
- Clade: Embryophytes
- Clade: Tracheophytes
- Clade: Angiosperms
- Clade: Eudicots
- Order: Dilleniales
- Family: Dilleniaceae
- Genus: Hibbertia
- Species: H. riparia

Binomial name
- Hibbertia riparia (R.Br. ex DC.) Hoogland

Synonyms
- List: Hibbertia sp. (Grampians); Hibbertia sp. B; Hibbertia stricta f. cinerea Gand.; Hibbertia stricta f. glabra Gand.; Hibbertia stricta f. gunnii Gand.; Hibbertia stricta f. rosmarinifolia Gand.; Hibbertia stricta var. canescens Benth.; Hibbertia stricta var. fruticosa Domin; Hibbertia stricta var. glabriuscula Benth. p.p.; Hibbertia stricta var. hirtiflora Benth. p.p.; Pleurandra riparia R.Br. ex DC.; Pleurandra riparia var. glabriuscula Hook. nom. inval.; Pleurandra riparia var. pubescens Hook.; Pleurandra riparia R.Br. ex DC. var. riparia; Hibbertia australis auct. non N.A.Wakef.: Hoogland, R.D. (1974) p.p.; Hibbertia stricta auct. non (DC.) R.Br. ex F.Muell.: Curtis, W.M. (1956); Hibbertia stricta auct. non (DC.) R.Br. ex F.Muell.: Jessop, J.P. in Jessop, J.P. & Toelken, H.R. (ed.) (1986) p.p.; Hibbertia stricta auct. non (DC.) R.Br. ex F.Muell.: Harden, G.J. & Everett, J. in Harden, G.J. (ed.) (1990) p.p.; Hibbertia stricta auct. non (DC.) R.Br. ex F.Muell.: Carolin, R.C. & Tindale, M.D. (1994) p.p.

= Hibbertia riparia =

Erect guinea flower

Species of plant

Hibbertia riparia, commonly known as erect guinea-flower, is a species of flowering plant in the family Dilleniaceae and is endemic to the south-eastern Australia. It is an erect to spreading shrub with hairy foliage, linear leaves and yellow flowers with six to sixteen stamens in a single cluster on one side of two carpels.

== Description ==
Hibbertia riparia is an erect to spreading shrub that typically grows to a height of up to 1.2 m (3 ft 11 in) and has hairy foliage. The leaves are linear, mostly 8–10 mm (0.31–0.39 in) long and 0.5–2 mm (0.020–0.079 in) wide on a petiole up to 0.6 mm (0.024 in) long. The flowers are mainly arranged in leaf axils or on the ends of short, are usually sessile and have one to a few linear bracts 2.4–6.2 mm (0.094–0.244 in) long at the base. The five sepals are joined at the base, 6–12 mm (0.24–0.47 in) long and of several lengths. The petals are yellow, egg-shaped with the narrower end towards the base and 6–12 mm (0.24–0.47 in) long with six to sixteen stamens in a single cluster on one side of the two silky-hairy carpels. Flowering occurs from September to December.

== Taxonomy ==
Erect guinea-flower was first formally described in 1817 by Augustin Pyramus de Candolle in Regni Vegetabilis Systema Naturale and given the name Pleurandra riparia, from an unpublished description by Robert Brown of plant material Brown collected in Tasmania. In 1974, Ruurd Dirk Hoogland changed the name to Hibbertia riparia in the Kew Bulletin. The specific epithet (riparia) means "inhabiting river banks".

In 2010, two new species were segregated from Hibbertia riparia: H. devitata and H. setifera.

== Distribution and habitat ==
Erect guinea-flower is found from south-eastern Queensland to Tasmania and westwards to the south-east of South Australia. It grows in a range of habitats from heathland to open forest and is widespread in New South Wales, especially on the coast and tablelands, throughout most of Victoria, the south-east of South Australia and in lowland parts of Tasmania.
