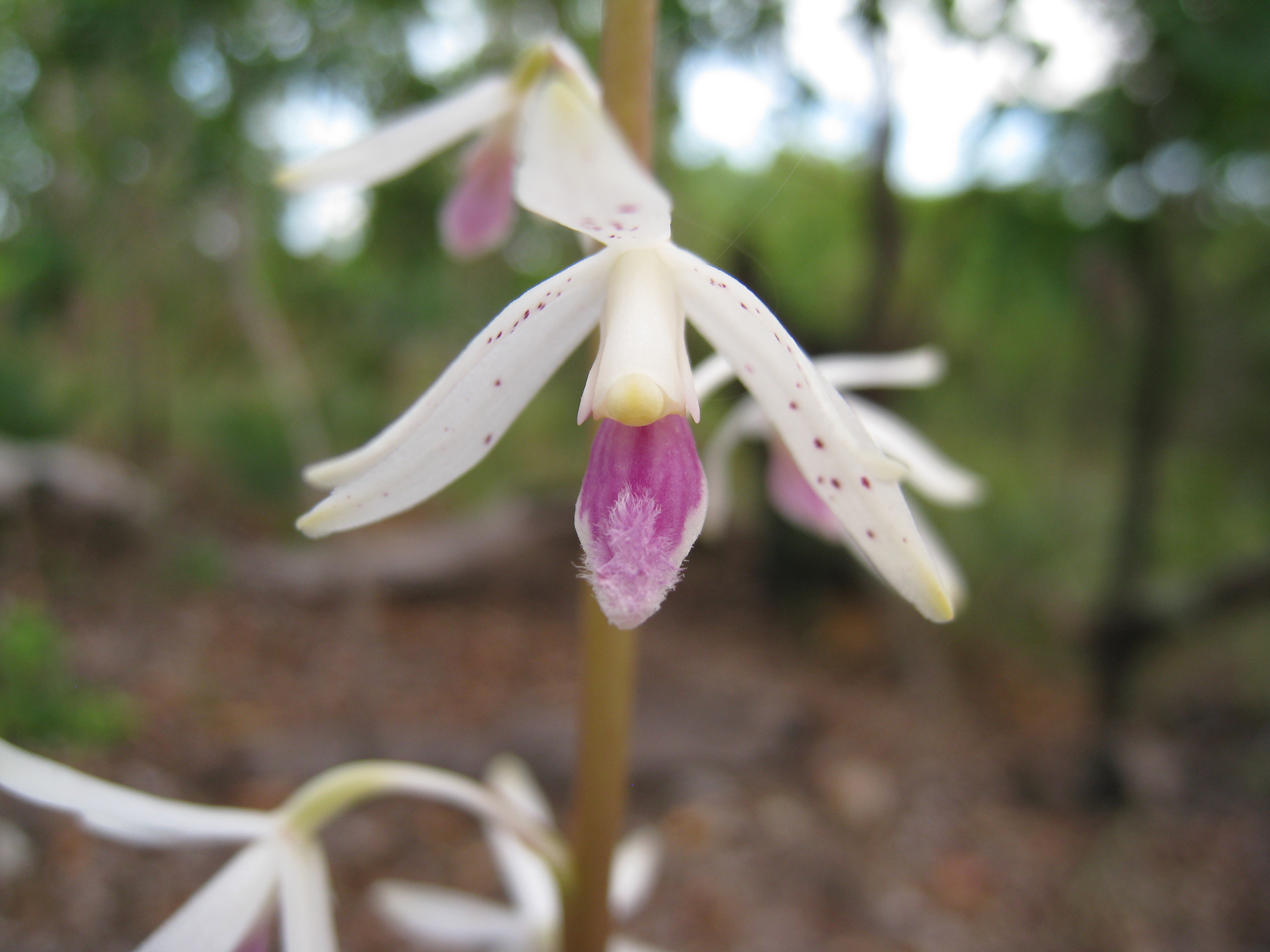
- Dipodium stenocheilum in Charles Darwin National Park

Scientific classification
- Kingdom: Plantae
- Clade: Tracheophytes
- Clade: Angiosperms
- Clade: Monocots
- Order: Asparagales
- Family: Orchidaceae
- Subfamily: Epidendroideae
- Genus: Dipodium
- Species: D. stenocheilum

Binomial name
- Dipodium stenocheilum O.Schwarz

Synonyms
- Dipodium punctatum var. stenocheilum (O.Schwarz) Rupp

= Dipodium stenocheilum =

Tropical hyacinth orchid

Species of orchid

Dipodium stenocheilum, commonly known as tropical hyacinth-orchid, is a leafless saprophytic orchid that is endemic to northern Australia. For most of the year the plant is dormant but in summer it produces a tall flowering stem with up to twenty five white flowers with purple spots and a mauve labellum.

== Description ==
Dipodium stenocheilum is a leafless, tuberous, perennial, mycoheterotrophic herb. For most of the year the plant is dormant but in summer it produces between three and twenty five white flowers with purple spots and 40–50 mm (1.6–2.0 in) wide are borne on a greenish yellow flowering stem 40–120 cm (20–50 in) tall. The dorsal sepal is 20–30 mm (0.8–1 in) long, 4–6 mm (0.16–0.24 in) wide but the lateral sepals are slightly longer, the petals shorter than both. The sepals and petals are free from each other and flat or only slightly curved backwards. The labellum is mauve with darker markings, 15–20 mm (0.6–0.8 in) long, 5–7 mm (0.2–0.3 in) wide and has three lobes with a central band of mauve hairs. Flowering occurs from November to March.

== Taxonomy and naming ==
Dipodium stenocheilum was first formally described in 1927 by Otto Schwarz and the description was published in Repertorium Specierum Novarum Regni Vegetabilis. The type specimen was collected near Port Darwin. The specific epithet (stenocheilum) is derived from the Ancient Greek words stenos meaning "narrow" or "tight" and cheilos meaning "lip" or "rim".

== Distribution and habitat ==
Dipodium stenocheilum occurs in the Northern Territory including Melville Island, on the Cape York Peninsula and the Kimberley region of Western Australia.

Andrew Phillip Brown, Matthew David Barrett and others have suggested that collections from Western Australia represent two species, yet to be formally described. They are the sandstone hyacinth orchid D. ammolithum (also known as Dipodium sp. 'sandstone') and the basalt hyacinth orchid D. basalticum (also known as Dipodium sp. 'basalt woodland').

== Ecology ==
Pollination of this species, as for all species in the genus, is by native bees and wasps.

== Cultivation ==
No leafless species of Dipodium has been successfully maintained in cultivation due to the inability to replicate the association with mycorrhizal fungi in a horticultural context.
