= Dipodium pulchellum =

Scientific classification
- Kingdom: Plantae
- Clade: Tracheophytes
- Clade: Angiosperms
- Clade: Monocots
- Order: Asparagales
- Family: Orchidaceae
- Subfamily: Epidendroideae
- Genus: Dipodium
- Species: D. pulchellum

Binomial name
- Dipodium pulchellum D.L.Jones & M.A.Clem.

Species of orchid

Dipodium pulchellum is an almost leafless orchid that is endemic to north-east New South Wales and south-east Queensland in Australia. Up to forty pink flowers with darker blotches are borne in summer and winter on flowering spikes up to 90 cm (40 in) long.

== Description ==
Dipodium pulchellum is a tuberous, perennial, mycoheterotrophic herb and for most of the year, plants are dormant and have no above-ground presence. Between five and forty pink flowers with heavy darker blotches are arranged on a flowering spike 22–90 cm (9–40 in) long with narrow egg-shaped leaves 7–25 mm (0.3–1 in) long at the base. The sepals are 13–15 mm (0.5–0.6 in) long and 3–5 mm (0.1–0.2 in) wide. The sepals and petals are flat and almost straight, unlike those of D. punctatum which are cupped and often slightly curved backwards. The labellum is 12–14 mm (0.5–0.6 in) long and dark-reddish pink with mauve hairs.

== Taxonomy ==
Dipodium pulchellum was formally described in 1987 by Australian botanists David Jones and Mark Clements from a specimen collected in the Tallebudgera Range in Queensland. The description was published in Proceedings of the Royal Society of Queensland. The specific epithet (pulchellum) is the diminutive form of the Latin word pulcher meaning "pretty", hence "pretty little".

== Distribution and habitat ==
This orchid occurs in south-east Queensland and north-east New South Wales near Wardell, Grevillia and Tia Falls.

== Ecology ==
Pollination of this species, as for all species in the genus, is by native bees and wasps.

== Use in horticulture ==
No leafless species of Dipodium has been sustained in cultivation due to the inability to replicate its association with mycorrhizal fungi in a horticultural context.
