= Dipodium freycinetioides =

Scientific classification
- Kingdom: Plantae
- Clade: Tracheophytes
- Clade: Angiosperms
- Clade: Monocots
- Order: Asparagales
- Family: Orchidaceae
- Subfamily: Epidendroideae
- Genus: Dipodium
- Species: D. freycinetioides

Binomial name
- Dipodium freycinetioides Fukuy.

Species of plant

Dipodium freycinetioides is an orchid species that is native to Palau. The species was formally described in 1937 by Japanese botanist Noriaki Fukuyama. Fukuyama described the species as climbing up trees in Aimeliik on the island of Babeldaob and distinguishes it from D. pictum by the shape of the labellum and flower color. Specimens cited by Fukuyama in his description of D. freycinetioides were collected while producing flowers and fruits in August and September 1932 and 1933. Dipodium freycinetioides is named for its resemblance to the vegetation in the genus Freycinetia.
