= Dipodium purpureum =

Scientific classification
- Kingdom: Plantae
- Clade: Tracheophytes
- Clade: Angiosperms
- Clade: Monocots
- Order: Asparagales
- Family: Orchidaceae
- Subfamily: Epidendroideae
- Genus: Dipodium
- Species: D. purpureum

Binomial name
- Dipodium purpureum J.J.Sm

Species of orchid

Dipodium purpureum is an orchid species that is native to Borneo. The species was formally described in 1910 by Dutch botanist Johannes Jacobus Smith.
