= Dipodium conduplicatum =

Scientific classification
- Kingdom: Plantae
- Clade: Tracheophytes
- Clade: Angiosperms
- Clade: Monocots
- Order: Asparagales
- Family: Orchidaceae
- Subfamily: Epidendroideae
- Genus: Dipodium
- Species: D. conduplicatum

Binomial name
- Dipodium conduplicatum J.J.Sm

Species of orchid

Dipodium conduplicatum is an orchid species that is native to Peninsular Malaysia and Sumatra. The species was formally described in 1927 by Dutch botanist Johannes Jacobus Smith.
