= Dipodium parviflorum =

Scientific classification
- Kingdom: Plantae
- Clade: Tracheophytes
- Clade: Angiosperms
- Clade: Monocots
- Order: Asparagales
- Family: Orchidaceae
- Subfamily: Epidendroideae
- Genus: Dipodium
- Species: D. parviflorum

Binomial name
- Dipodium parviflorum J.J.Sm

Species of orchid

Dipodium parviflorum is an orchid species that is native to Peninsular Malaysia and Sumatra in Indonesia. The species was formally described in 1911 by Dutch botanist Johannes Jacobus Smith.

In Peninsular Malaysia it has only been recorded in the Sungkap Forest Reserve in Kedah.
