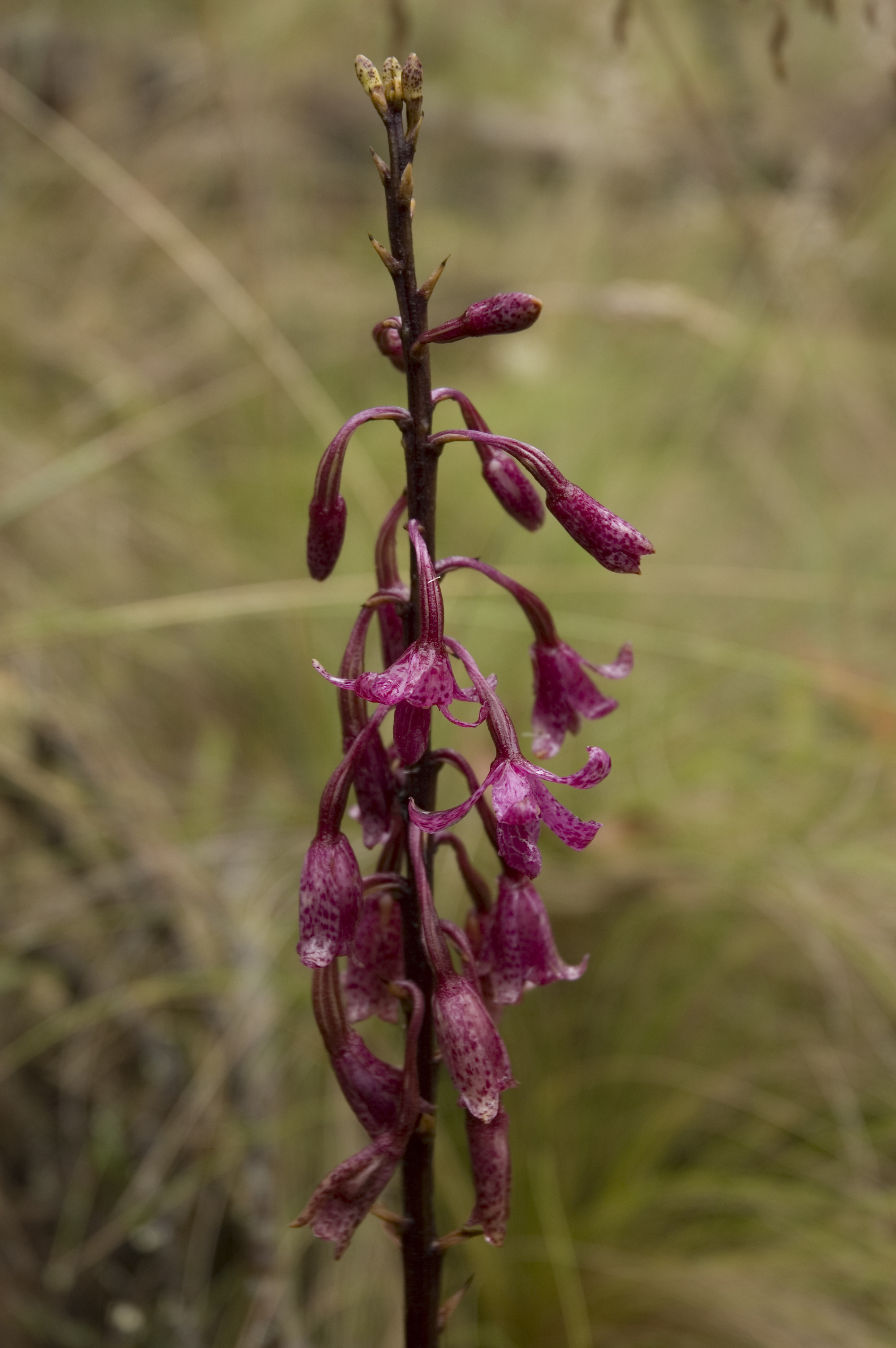
- Dipodium atropurpureum at New England National Park in January

Scientific classification
- Kingdom: Plantae
- Clade: Tracheophytes
- Clade: Angiosperms
- Clade: Monocots
- Order: Asparagales
- Family: Orchidaceae
- Subfamily: Epidendroideae
- Genus: Dipodium
- Species: D. atropurpureum

Binomial name
- Dipodium atropurpureum D.L.Jones

= Dipodium atropurpureum =

Purple hyacinth orchid

Species of orchid

Dipodium atropurpureum, commonly known as the purple hyacinth orchid, is a mostly leafless mycoheterotrophic orchid that is endemic to New South Wales. In summer it has up to forty dark pinkish purple to reddish purple flowers with darker spots and blotches on a tall flowering stem.

== Description ==
Dipodium atropurpureum is a tuberous, perennial herb with leaves reduced to overlapping, greenish purple bracts about 15 mm (0.6 in) long and 12 mm (0.5 in) wide on the flowering stem. For most of the year, plants are dormant and have no above-ground presence. The flowering stem reaches to a height of 400–600 mm (16–24 in) and appears between December and February. It bears between ten and forty dark pinkish purple to reddish purple flowers with darker spots and blotches, and 20–25 mm (0.8–1 in) wide. The dorsal sepal is linear to elliptic, 16–18 mm (0.6–0.7 in) long, about 5 mm (0.2 in) wide and the lateral sepals are a similar length but lance-shaped and slightly narrower. The petals are slightly shorter than the sepals and all are free from each other with their tips strongly curved backwards. The labellum is dark purplish red and projects forwards, 13–14 mm (0.5–0.6 in) long, 5–6.5 mm (0.2–0.3 in) wide with a narrow central band of mauve hairs up to 1 mm (0.04 in) long.

== Taxonomy and naming ==
Dipodium atropurpureum was first formally described in 1991 by Australian botanist David Jones and the description was published in Australian Orchid Research. The type specimen was collected east of Walcha in 1987. The specific epithet (atropurpureum) is derived from the Latin words ater meaning "black" and purpura meaning "purple", referring to the dark purple flowers of this orchid.

== Distribution and habitat ==
The purple hyacinth orchid is common on the ranges between Kyogle and Wauchope in northern New South Wales where it grows in open forest with sparse low shrubs.

== Ecology ==
Pollination of this species, as for all species in the genus, is by native bees and wasps.

== Cultivation ==
No leafless species of Dipodium has been sustained in cultivation due to the inability to replicate its association with mycorrhizal fungi in a horticultural context.
