= Dipodium bicallosum =

Scientific classification
- Kingdom: Plantae
- Clade: Tracheophytes
- Clade: Angiosperms
- Clade: Monocots
- Order: Asparagales
- Family: Orchidaceae
- Subfamily: Epidendroideae
- Genus: Dipodium
- Species: D. bicallosum

Binomial name
- Dipodium bicallosum J.J.Sm

Species of orchid

Dipodium bicallosum is an orchid species that is native to Peninsular Malaysia and Sumatra in Indonesia. The species was formally described in 1927 by Dutch botanist Johannes Jacobus Smith.
