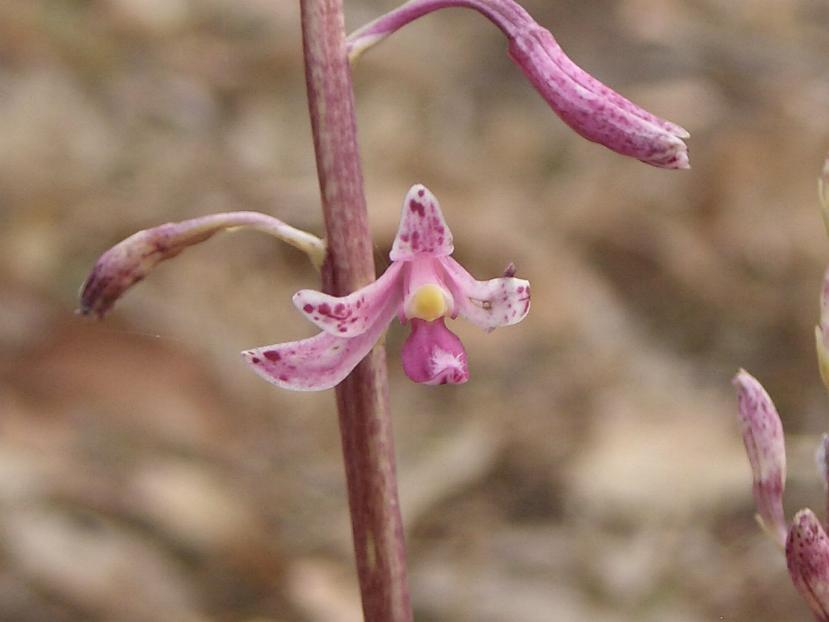

Scientific classification
- Kingdom: Plantae
- Clade: Tracheophytes
- Clade: Angiosperms
- Clade: Monocots
- Order: Asparagales
- Family: Orchidaceae
- Subfamily: Epidendroideae
- Genus: Dipodium
- Species: D. elegantulum

Binomial name
- Dipodium elegantulum D.L.Jones

= Dipodium elegantulum =

Species of orchid

Dipodium elegantulum, commonly known as the elegant hyacinth orchid, is a leafless orchid that is endemic to Queensland. In spring and summer it has up to sixty pale to dark pink flowers with a few darker spots and streaks near the tips, on a tall flowering stem.

== Description ==
Dipodium elegantulum is a tuberous, perennial, saprophytic herb. Between August and December it produces a flowering stem 500–800 mm (20–31 in) tall bearing between twenty and sixty flowers. The flowers are pale to dark pink with a few darker spots and streaks near the tips and 20–25 mm (0.8–1 in) wide. The dorsal sepal is linear to lance-shaped, 14–17 mm (0.6–0.7 in) long, 3–4 mm (0.1–0.2 in) wide and the lateral sepals are a similar shape but slightly longer and narrower. The petals are a similar shape but slightly curved, 13–15 mm (0.5–0.6 in) long, about 3 mm (0.1 in), free from each other and the sepals. The labellum is dark pink and projects forwards, 14–20 mm (0.6–0.8 in) long, 4–5 mm (0.2–0.2 in) wide with an upturned tip and a narrow central band of mauve hairs up to 0.5 mm (0.02 in) long.

== Taxonomy and naming ==
Dipodium atropurpureum was first formally described in 1991 by David Jones and the description was published in Australian Orchid Research from a specimen collected near Mareeba. The specific epithet (elegantulum) is a Latin word meaning "very fine", referring to the flowers of this orchid.

== Distribution and habitat ==
The elegant hyacinth orchid is widespread in forest and grassy woodland between the Mount Windsor Tableland, the Hervey Range and Charters Towers.
