= Dipodium brevilabium =

Scientific classification
- Kingdom: Plantae
- Clade: Tracheophytes
- Clade: Angiosperms
- Clade: Monocots
- Order: Asparagales
- Family: Orchidaceae
- Subfamily: Epidendroideae
- Genus: Dipodium
- Species: D. brevilabium

Binomial name
- Dipodium brevilabium Metusala & P.O'Byrne

Species of orchid

Dipodium brevilabium is an orchid species that is endemic to Western Papua in Indonesia. The species was formally described in 2009.
