= Dipodium campanulatum =

Bell-flower hyacinth orchid

Conservation status
- Endangered (EPBC Act)

Scientific classification
- Kingdom: Plantae
- Clade: Tracheophytes
- Clade: Angiosperms
- Clade: Monocots
- Order: Asparagales
- Family: Orchidaceae
- Subfamily: Epidendroideae
- Genus: Dipodium
- Species: D. campanulatum

Binomial name
- Dipodium campanulatum D.L.Jones

Species of orchid

Dipodium campanulatum, commonly known as the bell-flower hyacinth orchid, is a leafless mycoheterotroph orchid that is endemic to south-eastern Australia. In summer it has up to thirty five white flowers with large, dark red spots and blotches.

== Description ==
Dipodium campanulatum is a leafless, tuberous, perennial herb. For most of the year, plants are dormant and have no above-ground presence. The flowering stem reaches to a height of 400–700 mm (20–30 in) and appears between December and February. It bears between fifteen and thirty five slightly bell-shaped white flowers with large, dark red spots and blotches. The flowers are 15–30 mm (0.6–1 in) wide on a pedicel 10–18 mm (0.4–0.7 in) long. The sepals and petals are 12–14 mm (0.5–0.6 in) long, 3–5 mm (0.1–0.2 in) wide and all are free from each other with their tips curved slightly forwards. The labellum is 12–16 mm (0.5–0.6 in) long, 5–6 mm (0.20–0.24 in) wide with a narrow central band of mauve hairs up to 0.5 mm (0.02 in) long.

== Taxonomy and naming ==
Dipodium campanulatum was first formally described in 1991 by Australian botanist David Jones and the description was published in Australian Orchid Research. The type specimen was collected in Naracoorte in South Australia. The specific epithet (campanulatum) is the diminutive form of the Latin words campanula meaning "bell", hence "little bell", referring to the shape of the flowers of this orchid.

== Distribution and habitat ==
The bell-flower hyacinth orchid occurs in South Australia near the Victorian border and near Apsley in Victoria. Associated tree species include stringybark (Eucalyptus baxteri or Eucalyptus arenacea) and Eucalyptus leucoxylon. Other associated species include wattles Acacia spp., bracken Pteridium esculentum, cranberry heath (Astroloma humifusum) and magenta storksbill (Pelargonium rodneyanum).

== Ecology ==
Pollination of this species, as for all species in the genus, is by native bees and wasps.

== Conservation ==
The species is classed as "endangered" under the Australian Government Environment Protection and Biodiversity Conservation Act 1999, as "vulnerable" in South Australia and "endangered" in Victoria under the Flora and Fauna Guarantee Act 1988 and on the Victorian Department of Environment and Primary Industries' advisory list of rare or threatened plants in Victoria.

== Cultivation ==
No leafless species of Dipodium has been sustained in cultivation due to the inability to replicate its association with mycorrhizal fungi in a horticultural context.
