= Dipodium gracile =

Scientific classification
- Kingdom: Plantae
- Clade: Tracheophytes
- Clade: Angiosperms
- Clade: Monocots
- Order: Asparagales
- Family: Orchidaceae
- Subfamily: Epidendroideae
- Genus: Dipodium
- Species: D. gracile

Binomial name
- Dipodium gracile Schltr.

Species of plant

Dipodium gracile is an orchid species that is native to Sulawesi in Indonesia. The species was formally described in 1911 by German botanist Rudolf Schlechter.
