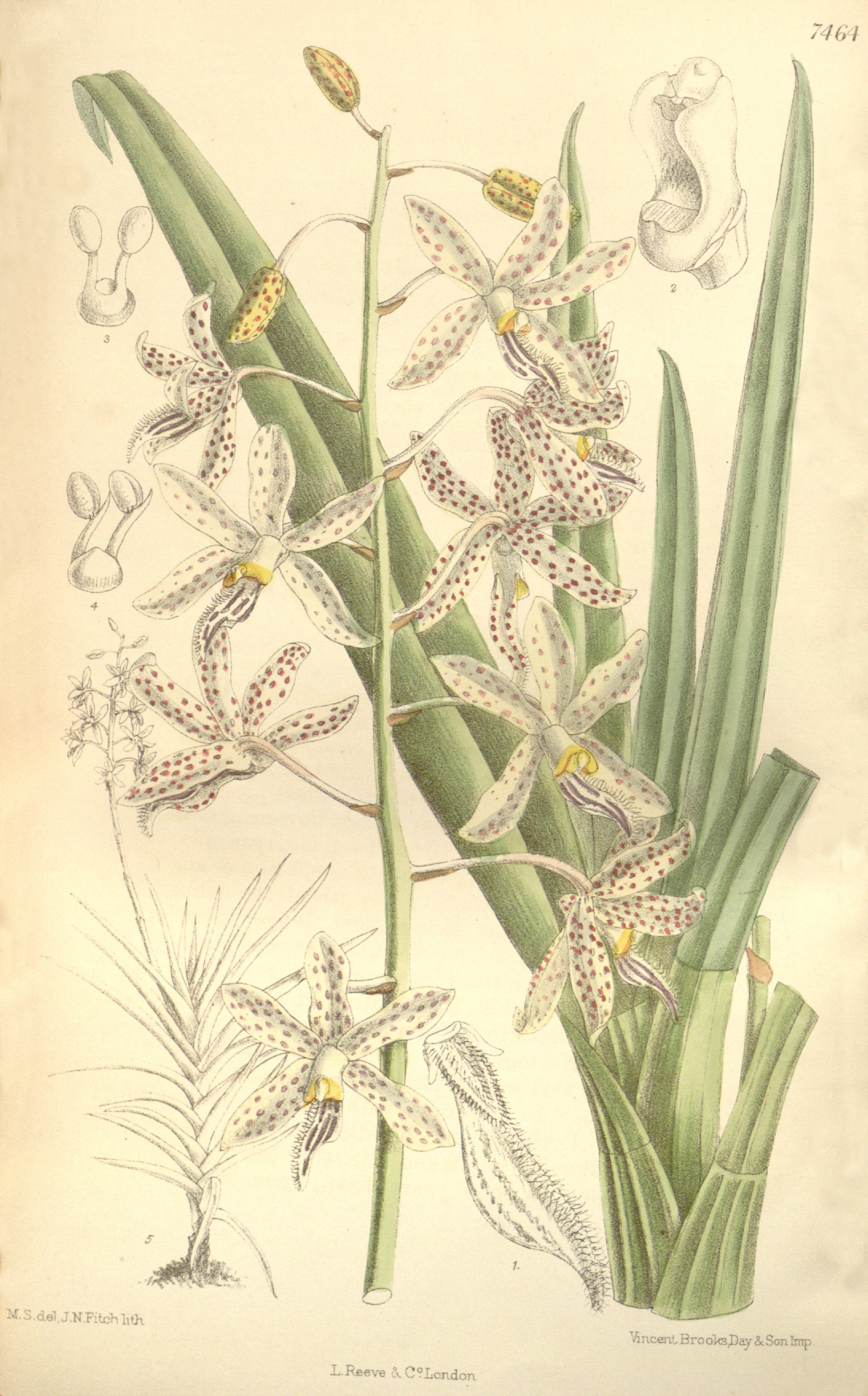
- Illustration from Curtis's Botanical Magazine in 1896

Scientific classification
- Kingdom: Plantae
- Clade: Tracheophytes
- Clade: Angiosperms
- Clade: Monocots
- Order: Asparagales
- Family: Orchidaceae
- Subfamily: Epidendroideae
- Genus: Dipodium
- Species: D. paludosum

Binomial name
- Dipodium paludosum (Griff.) Rchb.f.

= Dipodium paludosum =

Species of orchid

Dipodium paludosum is a terrestrial orchid species that is native to south-east Asia. It occurs in Cambodia, Thailand, Vietnam, the Philippines, Sumatra, Peninsular Malaysia and Borneo. The leaves up to 30 cm long and 2.5 cm wide. The axillary racemes comprise 6 to 12 fleshy flowers which are each up to 4 cm wide and are cream with purple-magenta spots.

The species was formally described in 1851 by British botanist William Griffith who gave it the name Grammatophyllum paludosum. Griffith had collected the plant from swampy upland in Malacca, growing in association with Nepenthes species. It was transferred to the genus Dipodium by German botanist Heinrich Gustav Reichenbach in 1862.
