= Dipodium fevrellii =

Scientific classification
- Kingdom: Plantae
- Clade: Tracheophytes
- Clade: Angiosperms
- Clade: Monocots
- Order: Asparagales
- Family: Orchidaceae
- Subfamily: Epidendroideae
- Genus: Dipodium
- Species: D. fevrellii

Binomial name
- Dipodium fevrellii J.J.Sm

Species of orchid

Dipodium fevrellii is an orchid species that is endemic to Sulawesi in Indonesia. The species was formally described in 1933 by Dutch botanist Johannes Jacobus Smith.
