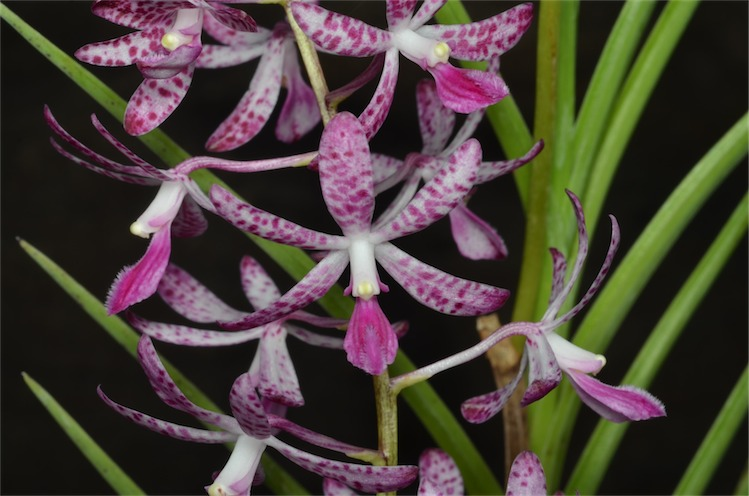

Scientific classification
- Kingdom: Plantae
- Clade: Tracheophytes
- Clade: Angiosperms
- Clade: Monocots
- Order: Asparagales
- Family: Orchidaceae
- Subfamily: Epidendroideae
- Genus: Dipodium
- Species: D. ensifolium

Binomial name
- Dipodium ensifolium F.Muell.

= Dipodium ensifolium =

Leafy hyacinth orchid

Species of orchid

Dipodium ensifolium, commonly known as leafy hyacinth-orchid, is an orchid species that is endemic to north-east Queensland. It has sword-shaped leaves and up to twenty pink to mauve flowers with purplish spots and blotches.

== Description ==
Dipodium ensifolium is a tuberous, perennial herb with from one to a few leafy stems 20–100 cm (8–40 in) long with overlapping sword-shaped leaves 120–200 mm (5–8 in) long and about 15 mm (0.6 in) wide. Flowering stems 300–550 mm (10–20 in) long develop in upper leaf axils, each with between two and twenty pink to mauve flowers with purplish spots and blotches, 20–25 mm (0.8–1 in) wide. The sepals are 18–25 mm (0.7–1 in) long, about 6 mm (0.2 in) wide and the petals are slightly shorter and narrower. The sepals and petals are free from each other and spread widely apart. The labellum is pink to mauve and projects forwards, 20–25 mm (0.8–1 in) long, 5–6 mm (0.20–0.24 in) wide with a narrow central band of mauve hairs. Flowering occurs between October and February.

== Taxonomy and naming ==
Dipodium ensifolium was formally described in 1865 by Ferdinand von Mueller from a specimen collected on rocky mountains near Rockingham Bay. The specific epithet (ensifolium) is derived from the Latin words ensis meaning "sword" and folium meaning "leaf".

== Distribution and habitat ==
The leafy hyacinth orchid grows in forest and woodland between Cooktown and Ingham. Plants develop long, lanky growths except when above ground parts are destroyed by fire, when they quickly produce new growth.

== Ecology ==
The flowers of this orchid are pollinated by small native bees.

== Use in horticulture ==
This orchid is easily grown in pots in warm climates and bright light.
