= Dipodium fragrans =

Scientific classification
- Kingdom: Plantae
- Clade: Tracheophytes
- Clade: Angiosperms
- Clade: Monocots
- Order: Asparagales
- Family: Orchidaceae
- Subfamily: Epidendroideae
- Genus: Dipodium
- Species: D. fragrans

Binomial name
- Dipodium fragrans P.O'Byrne & J.J.Verm.

Species of orchid

Dipodium fragrans is an orchid species that is native to south-east Asia. It was formally described in 2006. It occurs in Sumatra, Peninsular Malaysia, Borneo and Sulawesi.
