= Dipodium squamatum =

Scientific classification
- Kingdom: Plantae
- Clade: Tracheophytes
- Clade: Angiosperms
- Clade: Monocots
- Order: Asparagales
- Family: Orchidaceae
- Subfamily: Epidendroideae
- Genus: Dipodium
- Species: D. squamatum

Binomial name
- Dipodium squamatum (G.Forst.) Sm.

Species of orchid

Dipodium squamatum is a mycoheterotrophicorchid species of the tribe Cymbidieae.

== Taxonomy ==
The species was formally described in 1786 by German botanist Georg Forster, who gave it the name Ophrys squamata. It was then transferred to the genus Cymbidium as Cymbidium squamatum by the Swedish botanist Olof Swartz in 1800. In 1810, Scottish botanist Robert Brown noted the similarity of Cymbidium squamatum to his newly erected genus Dipodium, but did not make the combination, thus the commonly used author citation Dipodium squamatum (G.Forst.) R.Br. is incorrect. In 1819, the English botanist James Edward Smith provided the first valid combination for Dipodium squamatum in Rees's Cyclopædia.

The World Checklist of Selected Plant Families records Dipodium punctatum as a synonym of this species. In Australia, however, Dipodium punctatum is an accepted name in the Australian Plant Census.

In New Caledonia the name Dipodium punctatum var. squamatum is used to refer to the Dipodium species that occurs there. However Dipodium punctatum var. squamatum is recorded as an illegitimate name and a synonym of Dipodpium squamatum in the World Checklist of Selected Plant Families.

The earliest scientific collection of this species, from New Caledonia, is attributed to George Forster's father Johann Reinhold Forster. The elder Forster was the naturalist on James Cook's second expedition to the Pacific, and 19-year-old Georg was his assistant. Other early collections included that of Eugène Vieillard from arid coastal areas at Balade in New Caledonia and by Scottish botanists John MacGillivray and William Grant Milne from the island of Aneityum, part of current day Vanuatu .

== Distribution ==
According to the World Checklist of Selected Plant Families, the distribution of this species includes New Caledonia, Vanuatu and Australia.

In New Caledonia, the species occurs throughout Grande Terre and the Isle of Pines. In Vanuatu it is found on the southern islands of Aneityum and Erromango.
