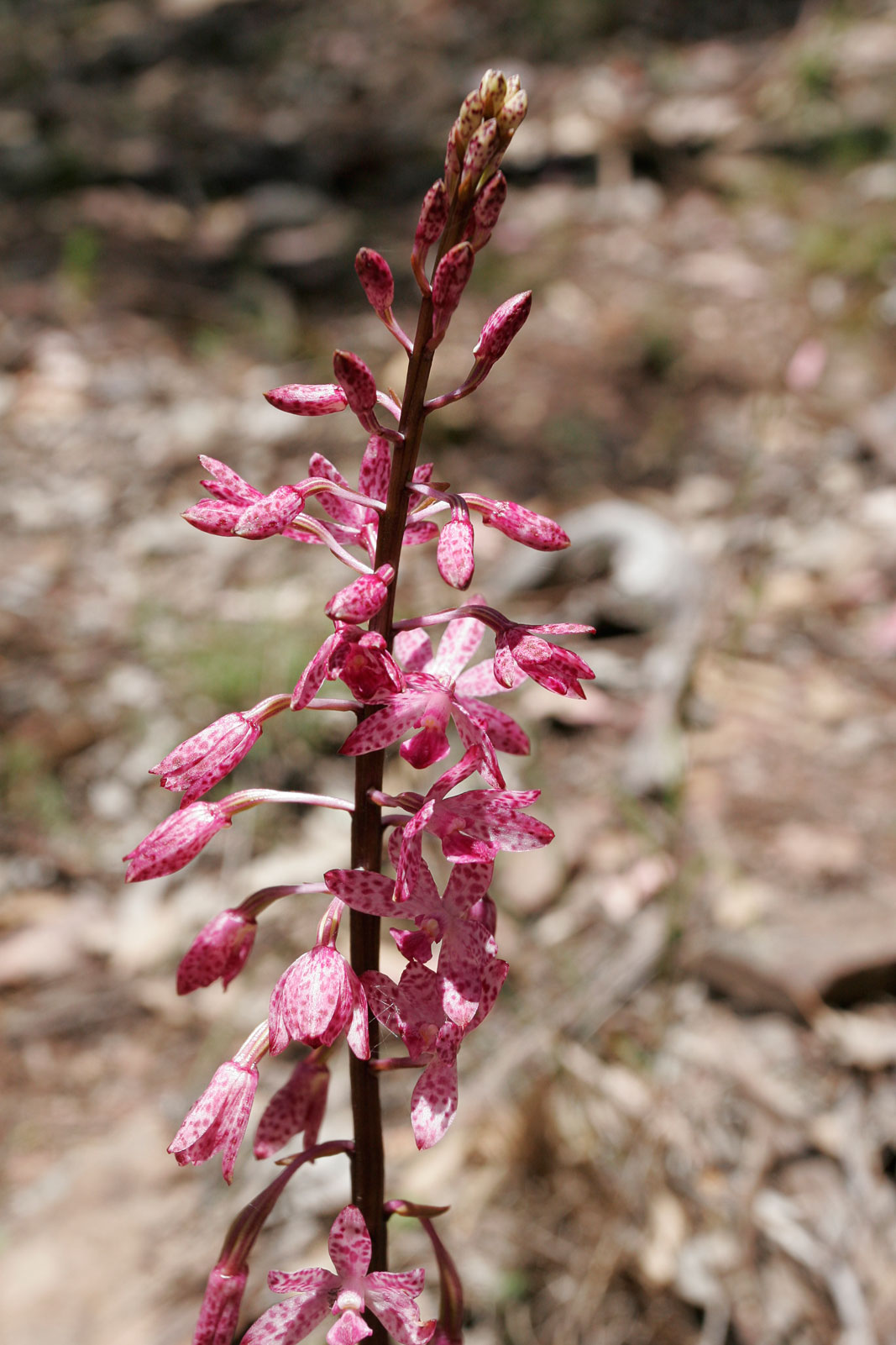
- Dipodium punctatum

Scientific classification
- Kingdom: Plantae
- Clade: Tracheophytes
- Clade: Angiosperms
- Clade: Monocots
- Order: Asparagales
- Family: Orchidaceae
- Subfamily: Epidendroideae
- Subtribe: Eulophiinae
- Genus: Dipodium; R.Br.

Type species
- Dipodium punctatum

Species
- See text

Synonyms
- Hydranthus Kuhl & Hasselt ex Rchb. f.; Leopardanthus Blume; Trichochilus Ames; Wailesia Lindl.

= Dipodium =

Hyacinth orchids

Genus of orchids

Dipodium, commonly known as hyacinth orchids, is a genus of about forty species of orchids native to tropical, subtropical and temperate regions of south-east Asia, New Guinea, the Pacific Islands and Australia. It includes both terrestrial and climbing species, some with leaves and some leafless, but all with large, often colourful flowers on tall flowering stems. It is the only genus of its alliance, Dipodium.

== Description ==
Orchids in the genus Dipodium are perennial, terrestrial herbs or climbers/epiphytes. Many species, particularly in eastern Australia are leafless mycoheterotrophs. Others have medium-sized to very large leaves that are parallel-veined and have entire margins. The flowers are arranged in a raceme with very few or up to fifty large, often colourful flowers. These may be fragrant or odourless, are white, pink, purple, yellow or green, often with spots or blotches. The sepals and petals are free from and similar to each other. The labellum projects forwards and has three lobes with a central band of colourful hairs. Each flower has two pollinia that are supported on two stipes. Dehiscent capsules, produced after flowering, hold the seed which is released when the capsule splits longitudinally along six seams. Between 30 and 500 seeds are produced per capsule.

== Taxonomy ==
The genus was formally described in 1810 by Scottish botanist Robert Brown in Prodromus Florae Novae Hollandiae et Insulae Van Diemen. The name Dipodium is derived the Greek words di (two) and podia (little feet), a reference to the two stipes supporting the pollinia.

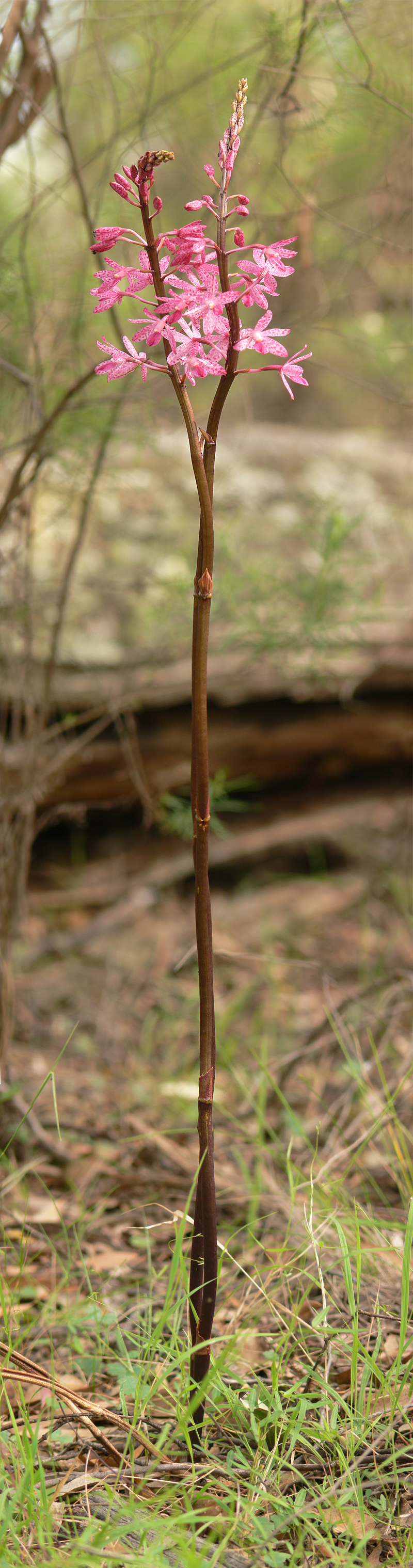
Two flowering scapes of a leafless species in south-eastern Australia

== Distribution and habitat ==
Hyacinth orchids are found in Malaysia, the Philippines, Indonesia, the Solomon Islands, Vanuatu, New Caledonia, New Guinea and Australia where eleven species are endemic. They occur in a range of habitats from coastal lowlands to ranges and tablelands.

== Ecology ==
It is thought that the flowers attract native bees and wasps through floral mimicry.

== Uses ==
An infusion of the leaves of Dipodium pandanum is traditionally drunk in Bougainville to help relieve respiratory infections.

=== Use in horticulture ===
Leafless hyacinth orchids are impossible to grow in cultivation but D. pandanum and D. ensifolium are easy to grow in warm climates.

== Species ==
The following is a list of described species in the genus Dipodium, recognised by Plants of the World Online apart from Dipodium punctatum which is recognised as a species in Australia (rather than as a synonym of Dipodium squamatum).

- Dipodium ambiguum P.O'Byrne, Gokusing & A.Lamb - from Malesia
- Dipodium ammolithum M.D.Barrett, R.L.Barrett & K.W.Dixon – from Western Australia
- Dipodium atropurpureum D.L.Jones - purple hyacinth orchid, from New South Wales
- Dipodium basalticum M.D.Barrett, R.L.Barrett & K.W.Dixon – from Western Australia
- Dipodium bicallosum J.J.Sm. - from Peninsular Malaysia and Sumatra
- Dipodium bicarinatum P.O'Byrne - from Peninsular Malaysia
- Dipodium brassii P.O'Byrne - from Papua New Guinea
- Dipodium brevilabium Metusala & P.O'Byrne - from Western Papua
- Dipodium campanulatum D.L.Jones - bell-flower hyacinth-orchid, from South Australia and Victoria
- Dipodium chanii P.O'Byrne, A.Lamb & Gokusing - from Borneo
- Dipodium conduplicatum P.O'Byrne, A.Lamb & Gokusing - from Peninsular Malaysia and Sumatra
- Dipodium confusum P.O'Byrne - from Borneo
- Dipodium elatum J.J.Sm. – from Sumatra
- Dipodium elegans J.J.Sm. - from Sumatra
- Dipodium elegantulum D.L.Jones - elegant hyacinth-orchid, from Queensland
- Dipodium ensifolium F.Muell. - leafy hyacinth-orchid, from north-east Queensland
- Dipodium fevrellii J.J.Sm. - from Sulawesi
- Dipodium fragrans P.O'Byrne & J.J.Verm. - from Sumatra, Peninsular Malaysia, Borneo, and Sulawesi
- Dipodium freycinetioides Fukuy. - from Palau
- Dipodium gracile Schltr. - from Sulawesi
- Dipodium hamiltonianum F.M.Bailey - yellow hyacinth-orchid, from Queensland, New South Wales, the A.C.T., and Victoria
- Dipodium interaneum D.L.Jones – from New South Wales and northeast Victoria
- Dipodium javanicum P.O'Byrne - from West Java
- Dipodium lambii P.O'Byrne - from Borneo
- Dipodium meijeri P.O'Byrne - from Borneo
- Dipodium moultonii P.O'Byrne, Gokusing & A.Lamb - from Borneo
- Dipodium paludosum (Griff.) Rchb.f. - from Cambodia, Thailand, Vietnam, the Philippines, Sumatra, Peninsular Malaysia, and Borneo
- Dipodium pandanum F.M.Bailey – from Maluku, Papuasia, and Queensland
- Dipodium pardalinum D.L.Jones - spotted hyacinth-orchid or leopard hyacinth-orchid, from South Australia and Victoria
- Dipodium parviflorum J.J.Sm. - from Peninsular Malaysia and Sumatra
- Dipodium pictum (Lindl.) Rchb.f. - from Malesia, Papuasia, and the Cape York Peninsula in Queensland
- Dipodium pulchellum D.L.Jones & M.A.Clem. - from New South Wales and Queensland
- Dipodium punctatum (Sm.) R.Br. - blotched hyacinth-orchid or hyacinth orchid, from New South Wales, the A.C.T., Victoria, and South Australia
- Dipodium purpureum J.J.Sm. - from Borneo
- Dipodium puspitae P.O'Byrne – from Sumatra and central Borneo
- Dipodium robertyongii P.O'Byrne - from Borneo
- Dipodium roseum D.L.Jones & M.A.Clem. - rosy hyacinth-orchid or pink hyacinth-orchid, from Queensland, New South Wales, the A.C.T., Victoria, South Australia, and Tasmania
- Dipodium scandens (Blume) J.J.Sm. - from Borneo, Java, the Philippines, Sulawesi, New Guinea, the Bismark Archipelago, and the Solomon Islands
- Dipodium speciosum P.O'Byrne - from Peninsular Malaysia
- Dipodium squamatum (G.Forst.) R.Br. - from New Caledonia and Vanuatu
- Dipodium stenocheilum O.Schwarz - tropical hyacinth-orchid, from the northern parts of Western Australia, the Northern Territory, and Queensland.
- Dipodium variegatum M.A.Clem. & D.L.Jones - blotched hyacinth-orchid or slender hyacinth-orchid, from Queensland, New South Wales, and Victoria
- Dipodium wenzelii P.O'Byrne - from Borneo
