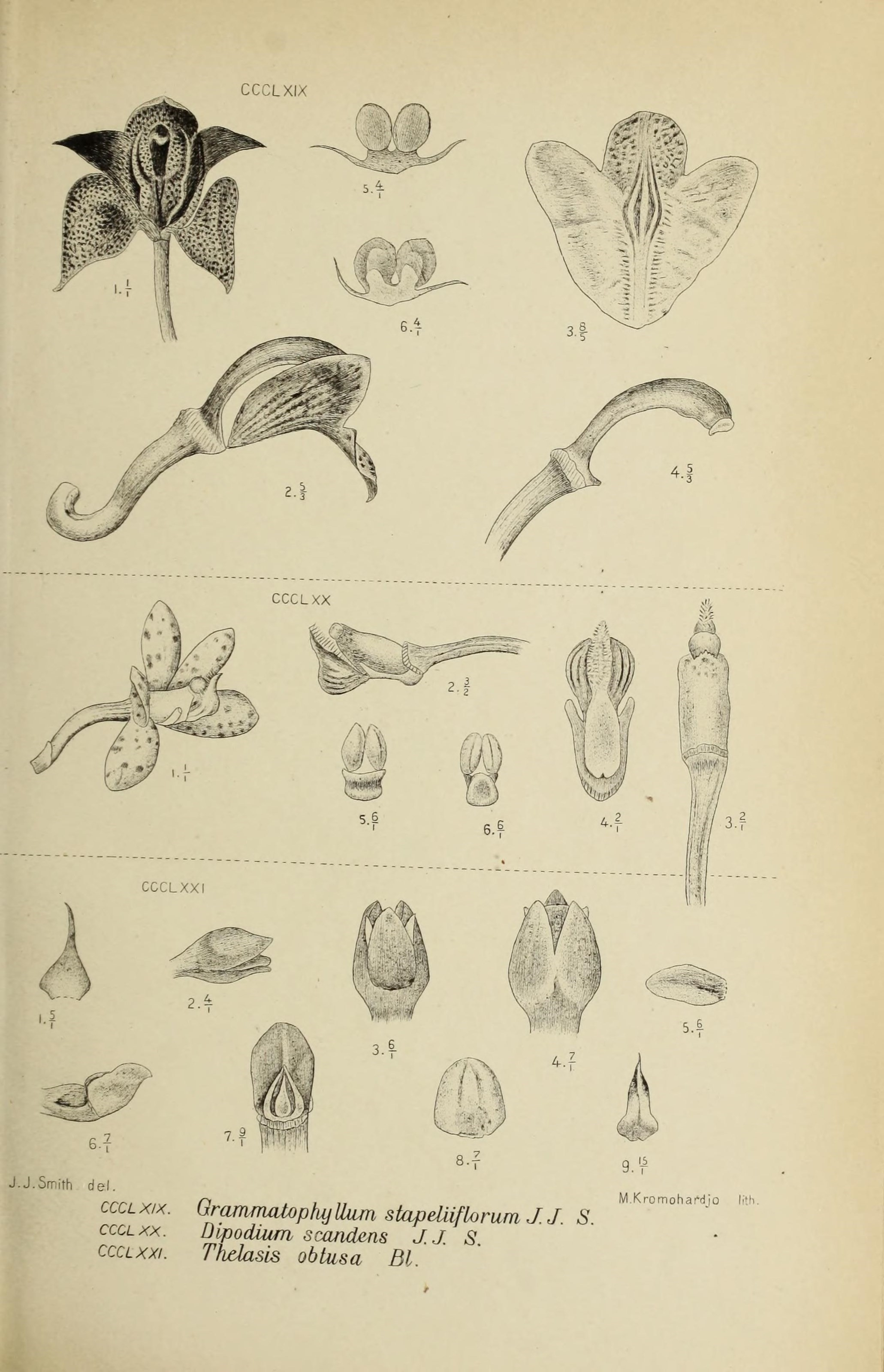
- As illustrated in Die Orchideen von Java, 1911

Scientific classification
- Kingdom: Plantae
- Clade: Tracheophytes
- Clade: Angiosperms
- Clade: Monocots
- Order: Asparagales
- Family: Orchidaceae
- Subfamily: Epidendroideae
- Genus: Dipodium
- Species: D. scandens

Binomial name
- Dipodium scandens (Blume) J.J.Sm

Synonyms
- Hydranthus scandens (Blume) Kuhl & Hasselt ex Rchb.f. in Xenia Orchid. 2: 20 (1862) Leopardanthus scandens Blume in Rumphia 4: 47 (1849)

= Dipodium scandens =

Species of orchid

Dipodium scandens is an orchid species that is native to western Java in Indonesia.

== Taxonomy ==
The species was formally described in 1849 by German-Dutch botanist Carl Ludwig Blume who gave it the name Leopardanthus scandens. It was given its current name by Dutch botanist Johannes Jacobus Smith in 1905.

== Distribution ==
Plants of the World Online lists the distribution of this species as western Java.
