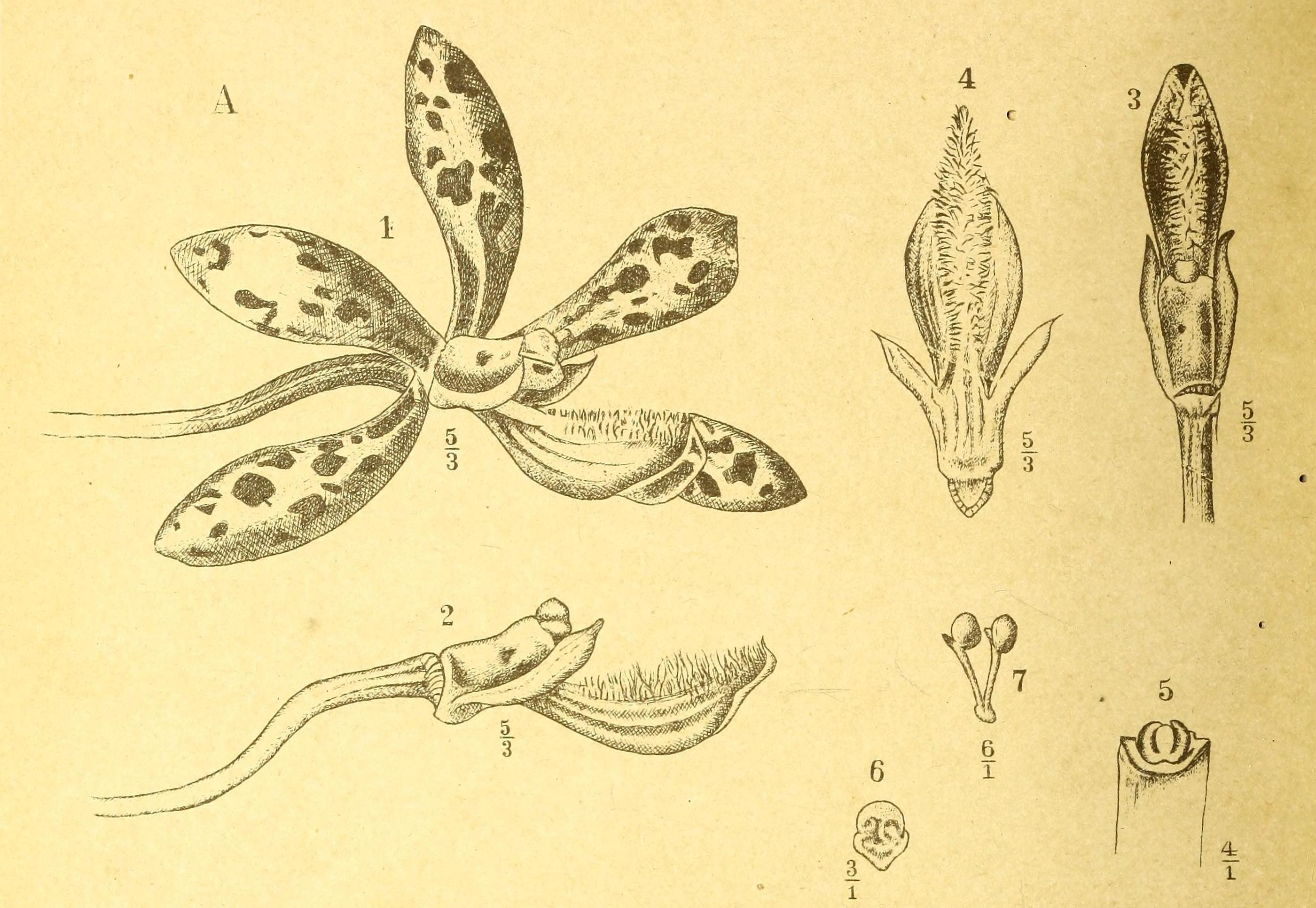
- Dipodium elegans - Icones Bogorienses V2 Tab CXXII A (1903-06)

Scientific classification
- Kingdom: Plantae
- Clade: Tracheophytes
- Clade: Angiosperms
- Clade: Monocots
- Order: Asparagales
- Family: Orchidaceae
- Subfamily: Epidendroideae
- Genus: Dipodium
- Species: D. elegans

Binomial name
- Dipodium elegans J.J.Sm

= Dipodium elegans =

Species of orchid

Dipodium elegans is an orchid species that is native to Sumatra in Indonesia. The species was formally described in 1900 by Dutch botanist Johannes Jacobus Smith.
