= Dipodium pandanum =

Scientific classification
- Kingdom: Plantae
- Clade: Embryophytes
- Clade: Tracheophytes
- Clade: Spermatophytes
- Clade: Angiosperms
- Clade: Monocots
- Order: Asparagales
- Family: Orchidaceae
- Subfamily: Epidendroideae
- Genus: Dipodium
- Species: D. pandanum

Binomial name
- Dipodium pandanum F.M.Bailey (1902)

Species of Orchid

Dipodium pandanum is a species of orchid. It is a scrambling shrub native to the Maluku Islands, Papuasia (the Bismarck Archipelago, New Guinea, and the Solomon Islands), and Queensland, Australia.
