= Dipodium ambiguum =

Scientific classification
- Kingdom: Plantae
- Clade: Tracheophytes
- Clade: Angiosperms
- Clade: Monocots
- Order: Asparagales
- Family: Orchidaceae
- Subfamily: Epidendroideae
- Genus: Dipodium
- Species: D. ambiguum

Binomial name
- Dipodium ambiguum O'Byrne, Gokusing & A.L.Lamb

Species of orchid

Dipodium ambiguum is an orchid species that is endemic in Borneo. The species was formally described in 2017 by Peter O'Byrne, Linus Gokusing and Anthony Lamb. The description was published in Volume 19 of the Malesian Orchid Journal, edited by André Schuiteman.
