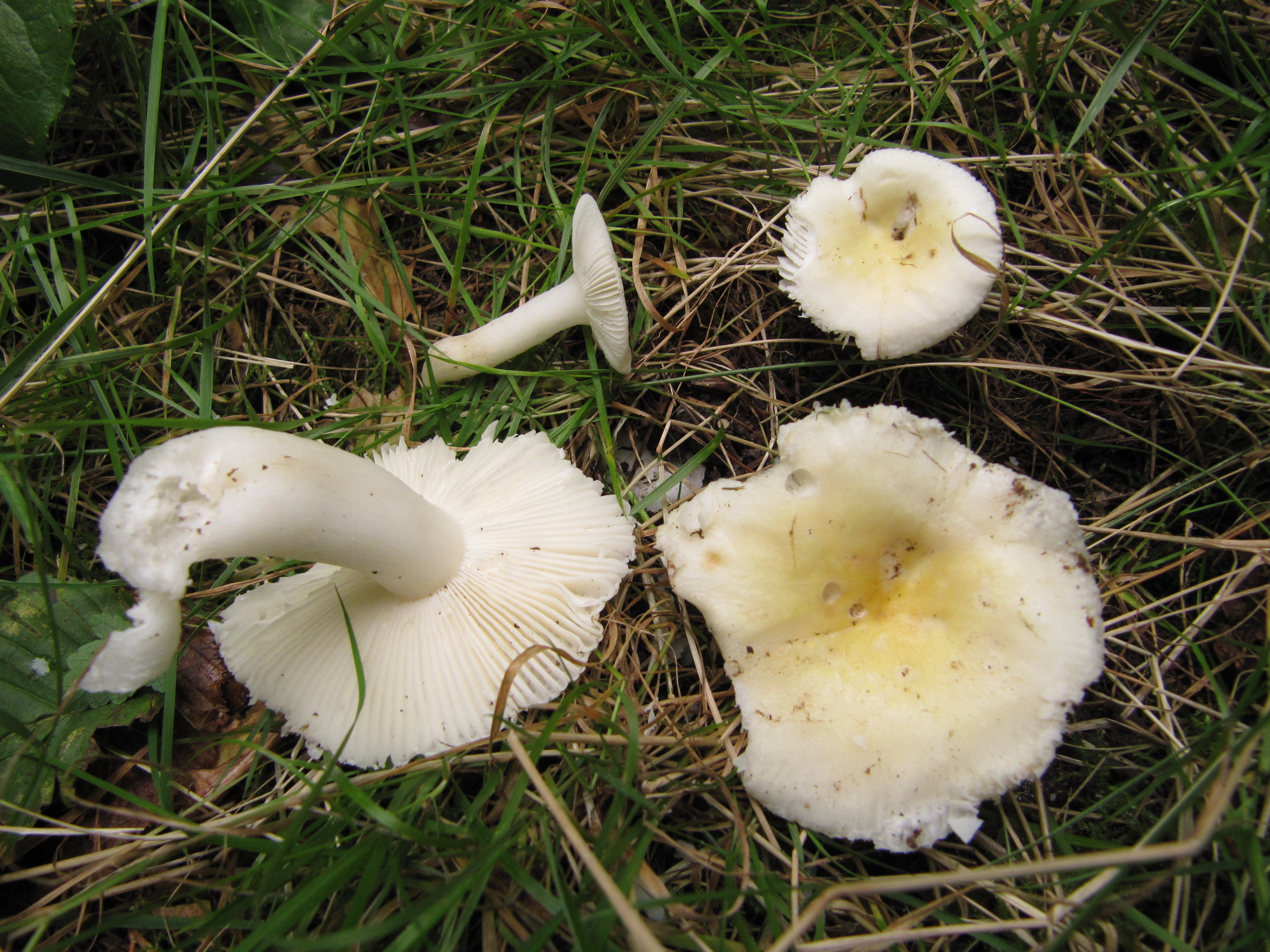

Scientific classification
- Domain: Eukaryota
- Kingdom: Fungi
- Division: Basidiomycota
- Class: Agaricomycetes
- Order: Russulales
- Family: Russulaceae
- Genus: Russula
- Species: R. solaris

Binomial name
- Russula solaris Ferd. & Winge (1924)

= Russula solaris =

Species of fungus

Russula solaris is a species of fungus in the family Russulaceae. It is found in Europe.

== See also ==
- List of Russula species
