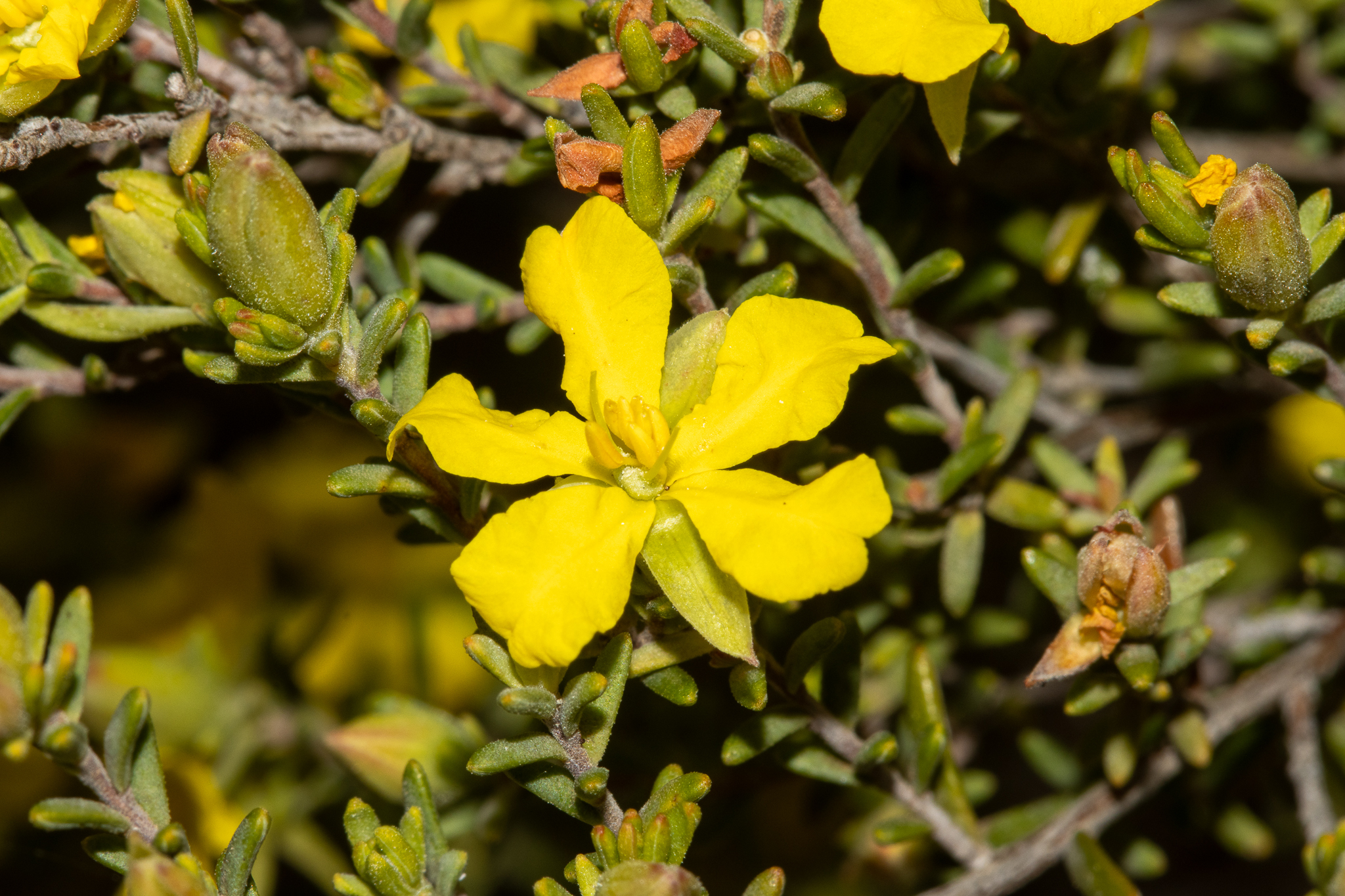

Scientific classification
- Kingdom: Plantae
- Clade: Tracheophytes
- Clade: Angiosperms
- Clade: Eudicots
- Order: Dilleniales
- Family: Dilleniaceae
- Genus: Hibbertia
- Species: H. devitata

Binomial name
- Hibbertia devitata Toelken

= Hibbertia devitata =

Species of plant

Hibbertia devitata is a species of flowering plant in the family Dilleniaceae and is endemic to south-eastern continental Australia. It is an erect to spreading shrub with linear to lance-shaped leaves and single yellow flowers arranged on the ends of branchlets, usually with six to eight stamens joined in a single group on one side of two carpels.

== Description ==
Hibbertia devitata is an erect to spreading shrub that typically grows up to 80 cm (31 in) high. The leaves are linear to lance-shaped, 3.5–7 mm (0.14–0.28 in) long and 1.0–1.3 mm (0.039–0.051 in) wide on a petiole up to 0.7 mm (0.028 in) long. The flowers are usually sessile, arranged singly on the ends of branches or short side-shoots, with linear to lance-shaped bracts 2.2–3.4 mm (0.087–0.134 in) long. The five sepals are joined at the base, 6–6.7 mm (0.24–0.26 in) long, the two outer sepal lobes slightly longer but narrower than the inner lobes. The five petals are egg-shaped with the narrower end towards the base, yellow and 6–9 mm (0.24–0.35 in) long. There are usually six to eight stamens fused at their bases, in a single group on one side of the two hairy carpels, each carpel with four to six ovules. Flowering mainly occurs from August to November.

== Taxonomy ==
Hibbertia devitata was first formally described in 2010 by Hellmut R. Toelken in the Journal of the Adelaide Botanic Gardens from specimens collected from Carcuma Conservation Park by Eric Jackson in 1985. The specific epithet (devitata) means "shunned", referring to the late description of this species.

== Distribution and habitat ==
This hibbertia grows in dry scrub or open mallee woodland in central western Victoria and south-eastern South Australia.

== See also ==
- List of Hibbertia species
