= Hibbertia setifera =

Scientific classification
- Kingdom: Plantae
- Clade: Tracheophytes
- Clade: Angiosperms
- Clade: Eudicots
- Order: Dilleniales
- Family: Dilleniaceae
- Genus: Hibbertia
- Species: H. setifera

Binomial name
- Hibbertia setifera Toelken

Species of flowering plant

Hibbertia setifera is a species of flowering plant in the family Dilleniaceae and is endemic to south-eastern continental Australia. It is a small, grey shrub with erect to spreading branches, linear leaves and yellow flowers with eight or nine stamens in a single cluster on one side of two hairy carpels.

== Description ==
Hibbertia setifera is a greyish, erect to spreading shrub that typically grows to a height of up to 50 cm (20 in) and has softly-hairy branches. The leaves are linear, mostly 4–7 mm (0.16–0.28 in) long, 1.1–1.4 mm (0.043–0.055 in) wide and sessile or on a short, indistinct petiole. The flowers are arranged singly on the ends of the main shoots and are more or less sessile with a few hairy, linear, leaf-like bracts 3.3–4.4 mm (0.13–0.17 in) long at the base. The five sepal are 5.2–5.7 mm (0.20–0.22 in) long and joined at the base, the outer lobes narrower than the inner ones. The five petals are yellow, 4.3–6.0 mm (0.17–0.24 in) long with eight or nine stamens in a single cluster on one side of the two hairy carpels, each carpel with four to six ovules. Flowering mostly occurs from June to December.

== Taxonomy ==
Hibbertia setifera was first formally described in 2010 by Hellmut R. Toelken in the Journal of the Adelaide Botanic Gardens from specimens collected by Hansjörg Eichler near Kelly Hill Caves on Kangaroo Island. The specific epithet (setifera) means "bristle-bearing" and refers mainly to the outer sepal lobes.

== Distribution and habitat ==
This hibbertia is locally abundant in scrub or mallee on Kangaroo Island, and is rarely recorded on the mainland of south-eastern South Australia and the far west of Victoria.

== See also ==
- List of Hibbertia species
