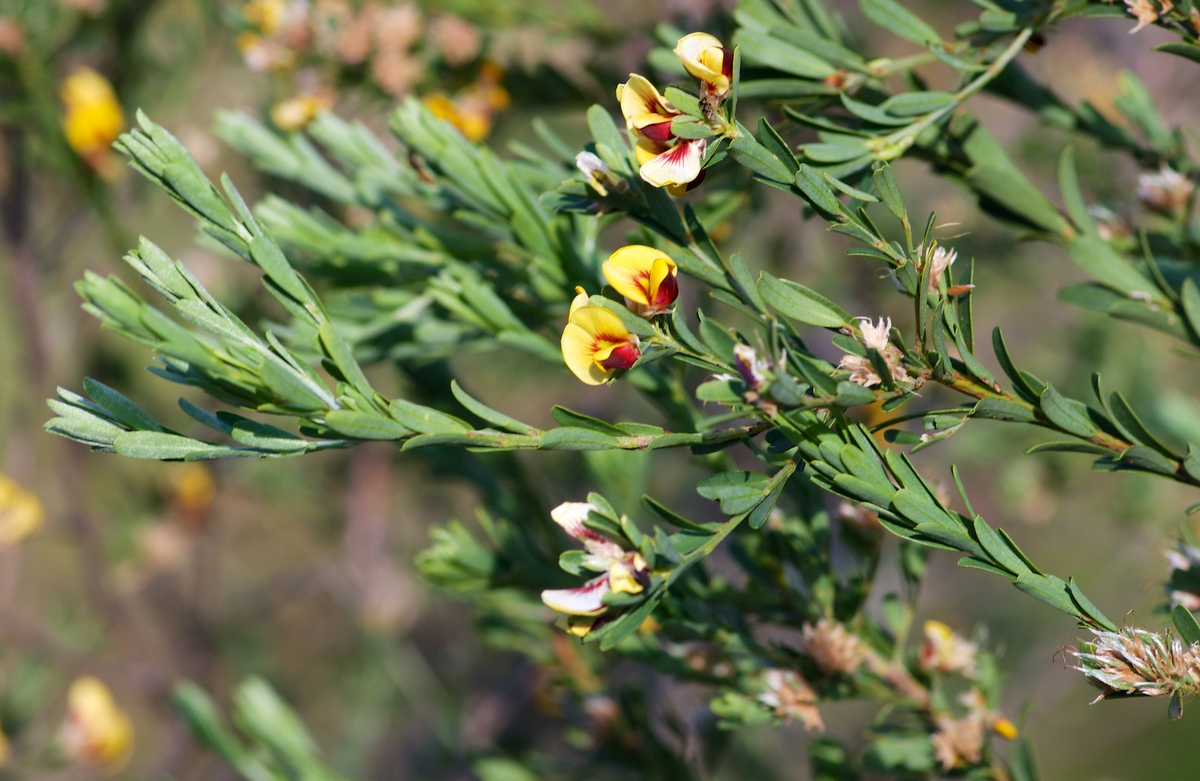
- In Warby-Ovens National Park

Scientific classification
- Kingdom: Plantae
- Clade: Tracheophytes
- Clade: Angiosperms
- Clade: Eudicots
- Clade: Rosids
- Order: Fabales
- Family: Fabaceae
- Subfamily: Faboideae
- Genus: Pultenaea
- Species: P. platyphylla

Binomial name
- Pultenaea platyphylla N.A.Wakef.

= Pultenaea platyphylla =

Flat-leaf bush-pea

Species of legume

Pultenaea platyphylla, commonly known as flat-leaf bush-pea, is a species of flowering plant in the family Fabaceae and is endemic to south-eastern continental Australia. It is an erect, rigidly-branched shrub with narrow egg-shaped to wedge-shaped leaves with the narrower end towards the base, and yellow to orange and red to purple flowers.

== Description ==
Pultenaea platyphylla is an erect, rigidly-branched shrub that typically grows to a height of 1.5–2 m (4 ft 11 in – 6 ft 7 in) with stems that are hairy when young. The leaves are arranged alternately, narrow egg-shaped to wedge-shaped with the narrower end towards the base, 8–20 mm (0.31–0.79 in) long, 3–6 mm (0.12–0.24 in) wide, the upper surface concave and with stipules 1.5 mm (0.059 in) long at the base. The flowers are arranged in clusters of more than five on the ends of branches and are 7–10 mm (0.28–0.39 in) long, each flower on a pedicel about 2 mm (0.079 in) long with overlapping, egg-shaped bracts 4–5 mm (0.16–0.20 in) long at the base. The sepals are 3–7 mm (0.12–0.28 in) long, joined at the base, and there are narrow egg-shaped bracteoles about 2 mm (0.079 in) long attached to the upper part of the sepal tube. The standard petal is yellow to orange with a reddish base and 8–9 mm (0.31–0.35 in) wide, the wings are yellow to orange and the keel is red to purple. Flowering occurs from September to November and the fruit is a flattened pod 6–8 mm (0.24–0.31 in) long.

== Taxonomy ==
Pultenaea platyphylla was first formally described in 1957 by Norman Arthur Wakefield in The Victorian Naturalist from specimens collected at Mt. Tarrengower near Maldon in 1921. The specific epithet (platyphylla) means "flat-leaved".

== Distribution and habitat ==
Flat-leaf bush-pea grows in forest on granite hills in scattered locations in north-eastern Victoria and south of Temora in New South Wales.
