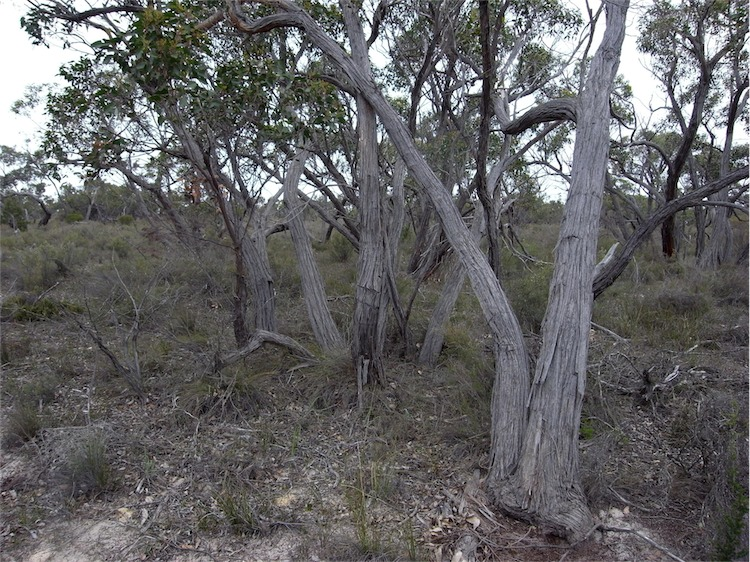
- Eucalyptus arenacea in the Little Desert National Park

Conservation status
- Least Concern (IUCN 3.1)

Scientific classification
- Kingdom: Plantae
- Clade: Tracheophytes
- Clade: Angiosperms
- Clade: Eudicots
- Clade: Rosids
- Order: Myrtales
- Family: Myrtaceae
- Genus: Eucalyptus
- Species: E. arenacea

Binomial name
- Eucalyptus arenacea Marginson & Ladiges

= Eucalyptus arenacea =

Desert stringybark

Species of eucalyptus

Eucalyptus arenacea, commonly known as the desert stringybark or sand stringybark, is a tree or a mallee that is endemic to south-eastern Australia. It has rough bark to the thinnest branches, lance-shaped or curved adult leaves, club-shaped flower buds arranged in groups of between seven and fifteen, white flowers and hemispherical to more or less spherical fruit.

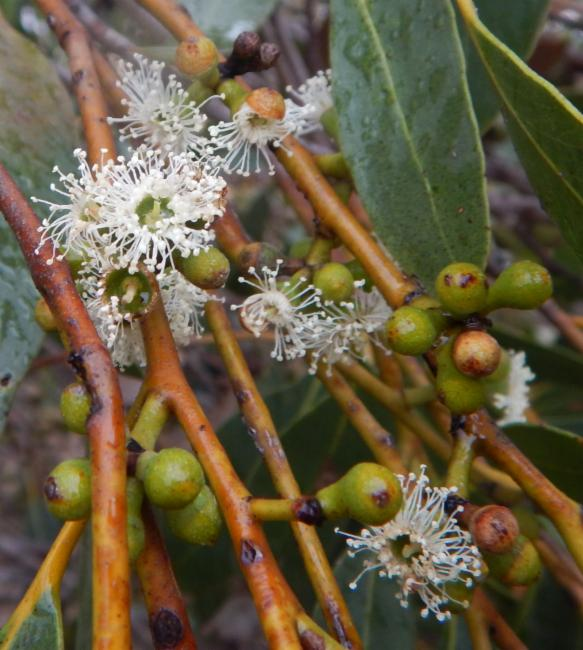
flowers and buds

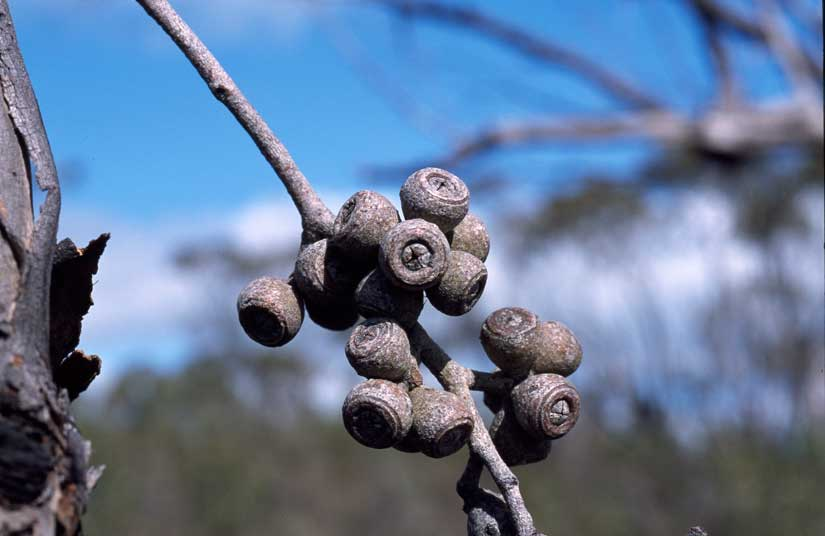
fruit

== Description ==
Eucalyptus arenacea is a tree with several to many stems or a robust mallee, grows to a height of 3–10 metres (10–30 ft) and forms a lignotuber. It has rough, fibrous and stringy bark on its trunk and to the thinnest branches. Leaves on young plants and on coppice regrowth are arranged in opposite pairs and are egg-shaped, 35–85 mm (1–3 in) long and 30–40 mm (1–2 in) wide. Adult leaves are shiny green, arranged alternately, lance-shaped or curved, 70–120 mm (3–5 in) long and 15–40 mm (0.6–2 in) wide on a petiole 10–25 mm (0.4–1 in) long. The flowers are borne in groups of between seven and fifteen in leaf axils on a peduncle 5–18 mm (0.20–0.71 in) long, the individual buds on a pedicel 2–5 mm (0.079–0.20 in) long. The mature buds are oval to club-shaped, 5–6 mm (0.20–0.24 in) long and 3–5 mm (0.1–0.2 in) wide with a rounded or conical operculum. Flowering mainly occurs between December and January and the flowers are white. The fruit is hemispherical to a truncated sphere, 4–9 mm (0.16–0.35 in) long and 7–12 mm (0.3–0.5 in) wide on a pedicel up to 3 mm (0.1 in) long.

== Taxonomy and naming ==
Eucalyptus arenacea was first formally described in 1988 by Julie Marginson and Pauline Ladiges and the description was published in Australian Systematic Botany. The specific epithet (arenacea) is a Latin word meaning "of sand".

== Distribution and habitat ==
Desert stringybark grows on pale-coloured sandhills and on sandplains between Keith, Pinaroo and Bordertown in the Ninety Mile Desert in South Australia and in the Little Desert and Big Desert areas of Victoria.

== See also ==
- List of Eucalyptus species
