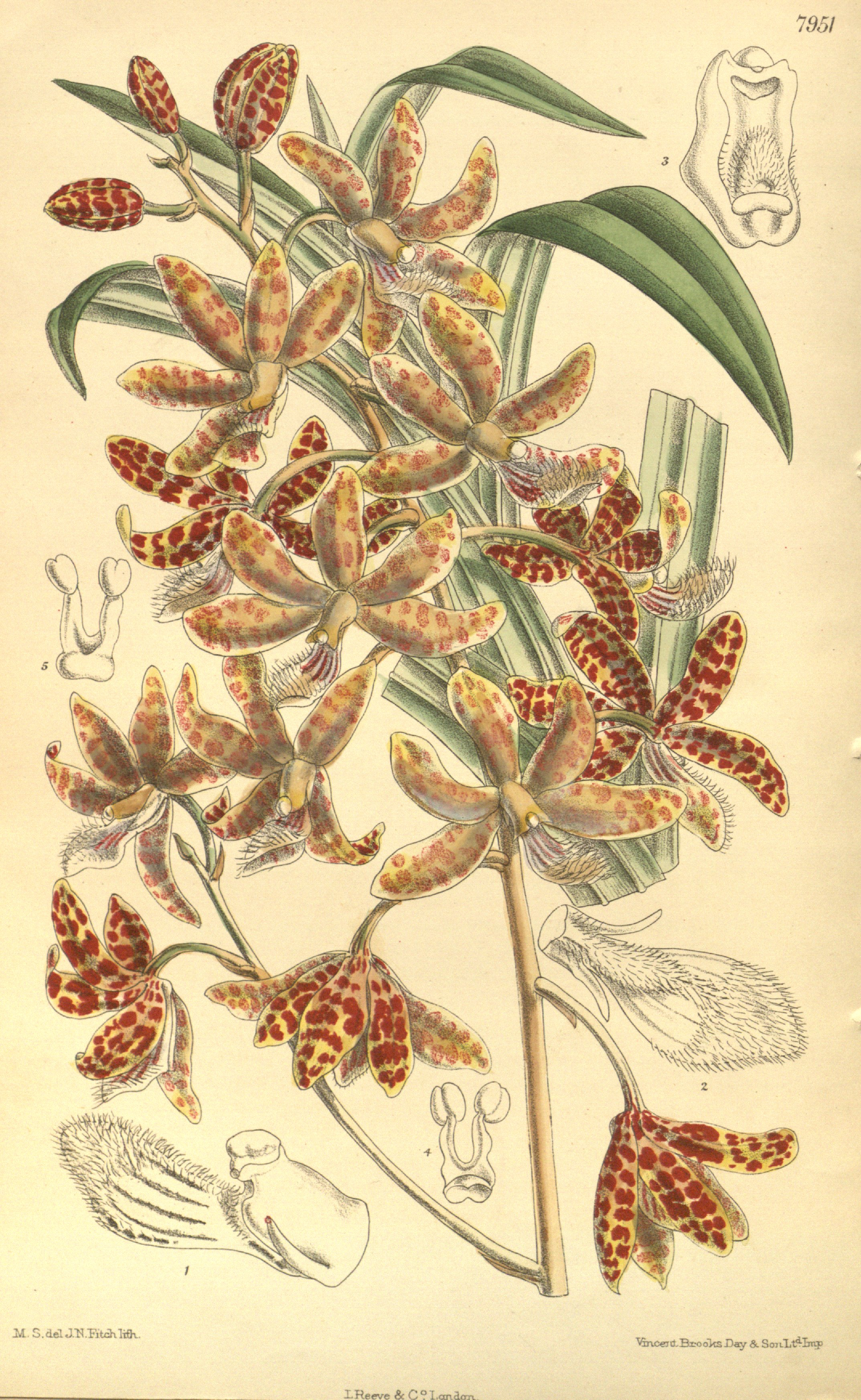
- Illustration from Curtis's Botanical Magazine in 1904

Conservation status
- Endangered (EPBC Act)

Scientific classification
- Kingdom: Plantae
- Clade: Tracheophytes
- Clade: Angiosperms
- Clade: Monocots
- Order: Asparagales
- Family: Orchidaceae
- Subfamily: Epidendroideae
- Genus: Dipodium
- Species: D. pictum

Binomial name
- Dipodium pictum (Lindl.) Rchb.f.

= Dipodium pictum =

Species of orchid

Dipodium pictum, commonly known as brittle climbing-orchid or climbing hyacinth-orchid, is an orchid species that is native to Malesia (including Indonesia and New Guinea) and the Cape York Peninsula in Australia.

== Description ==
Dipodium pictum is a slender vine with leaves that are arranged in a single plane These have overlapping bases and are about 30 to 40 cm long and 2 to 3 cm wide. The flowers are about 5 cm in diameter and have maroon spots.

== Taxonomy ==
The species was formally described in 1849 in The Journal of the Horticultural Society of London by English botanist John Lindley who gave it the name Wailesia picta. It was transferred to the genus Dipodium by German botanist Heinrich Gustav Reichenbach in 1862.

Dipodium pandanum, a species formally described by Frederick Manson Bailey in 1902, is treated as a synonym of Dipodium pictum in the Australian Plant Census. However, Plants of the World Online accepts it as a species. The type specimen for Dipodum pandanum was collected near Samarai in Papua New Guinea.

== Distribution ==
In Australia it is found within or on the edge of rainforest, often near watercourses, at altitudes ranging from 200 to 400 metres. Only four specimens have been recorded in Australia; from Kutini-Payamu National Park and a timber reserve in the McIlwraith Range on the Cape York Peninsula.

== Conservation ==
In Australia, the species is listed as "endangered" under the Commonwealth Environment Protection and Biodiversity Conservation Act as well as Queensland's Nature Conservation Act.
