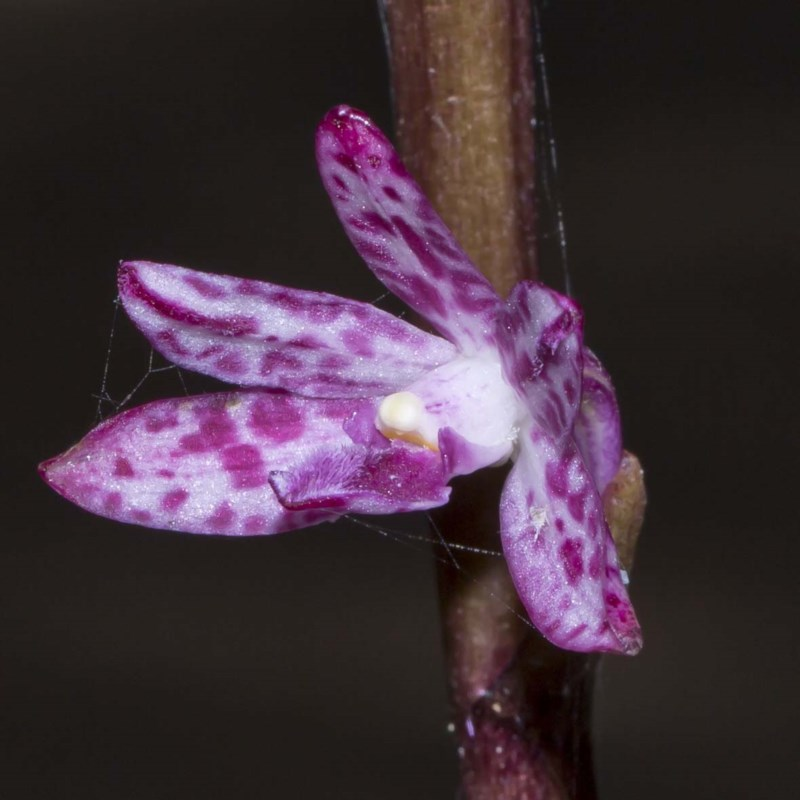
- Dipodium punctatum in Bournda National Park

Scientific classification
- Kingdom: Plantae
- Clade: Tracheophytes
- Clade: Angiosperms
- Clade: Monocots
- Order: Asparagales
- Family: Orchidaceae
- Subfamily: Epidendroideae
- Genus: Dipodium
- Species: D. punctatum

Binomial name
- Dipodium punctatum (Sm.) R.Br.

Synonyms
- Dendrobium punctatum Sm.; Wailesia punctata (Sm.) G.Nicholson

= Dipodium punctatum =

Blotched hyacinth orchid

Species of orchid

Dipodium punctatum, commonly known as the blotched hyacinth-orchid, is a leafless orchid that is a native to eastern and south-eastern continental Australia. In summer it produces a tall flowering stem with up to sixty pale to bright pink flowers with heavy red blotches. A widespread and common species it is often confused with D. roseum and some authorities regard it as a synonym of D. squamatum.

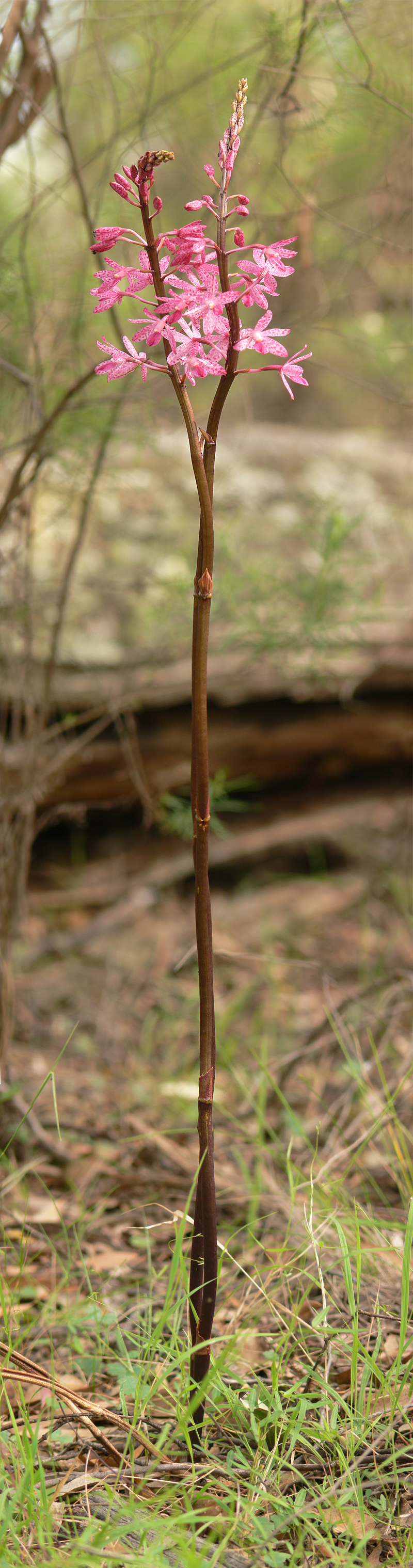
Dipodium punctatum habit

== Description ==
Dipodium punctatum is a leafless, tuberous, perennial, mycoheterotrophic herb. Between five and sixty pale to bright pink flowers with heavy red blotches and 20–25 mm (0.8–1 in) wide are borne on a green to blackish, hyacinth-like flowering stem 40–100 cm (20–40 in) tall. The sepals and petals are linear to elliptic or lance-shaped, 10–20 mm (0.4–0.8 in) long, 2.5–5 mm (0.1–0.2 in) wide and free from each other with their tips sometimes slightly curved backwards. The labellum is 12–16 mm (0.5–0.6 in) long, 5–6 mm (0.20–0.24 in) wide and has three lobes. The centre lobe has a band of pink to mauve hairs, the band narrow near the base but widening towards the tip of the lobe. Flowering occurs from November to March.

This orchid is often confused with D. roseum but has a narrower band of labellum hairs, darker blotches and less recurved sepals and petals.

== Taxonomy and naming ==
This orchid was first formally described in 1804 by English botanist James Edward Smith in the journal Exotic Botany. Smith gave it the name Dendrobium punctatum. In 1810, Scottish botanist Robert Brown placed the species in his newly described genus Dipodium, publishing the change in Prodromus Florae Novae Hollandiae et Insulae Van Diemen. The specific epithet (punctatum) is derived from the Latin word punctum meaning "little hole", "dot" or "point".

The World Checklist of Selected Plant Families (WCSP) records this species as a synonym of Dipodium squamatum.

== Distribution and habitat ==
The blotched hyacinth orchid is common in woodland and forest along the coast and ranges of New South Wales, the Australian Capital Territory and Queensland. It is also widespread in Victoria especially in the east of the state. There are a few records of the species from the far south-east corner of South Australia.

Dipodium punctatum does not occur in Tasmania. Plants in that state previously classified as D. punctatum are currently referred to D. roseum, which was described in 1991.

In South Australia, D. punctatum is listed as endangered. Populations currently included within D. roseum and D. campanulatum were originally part of a wider circumscription of D. punctatum in South Australia.
