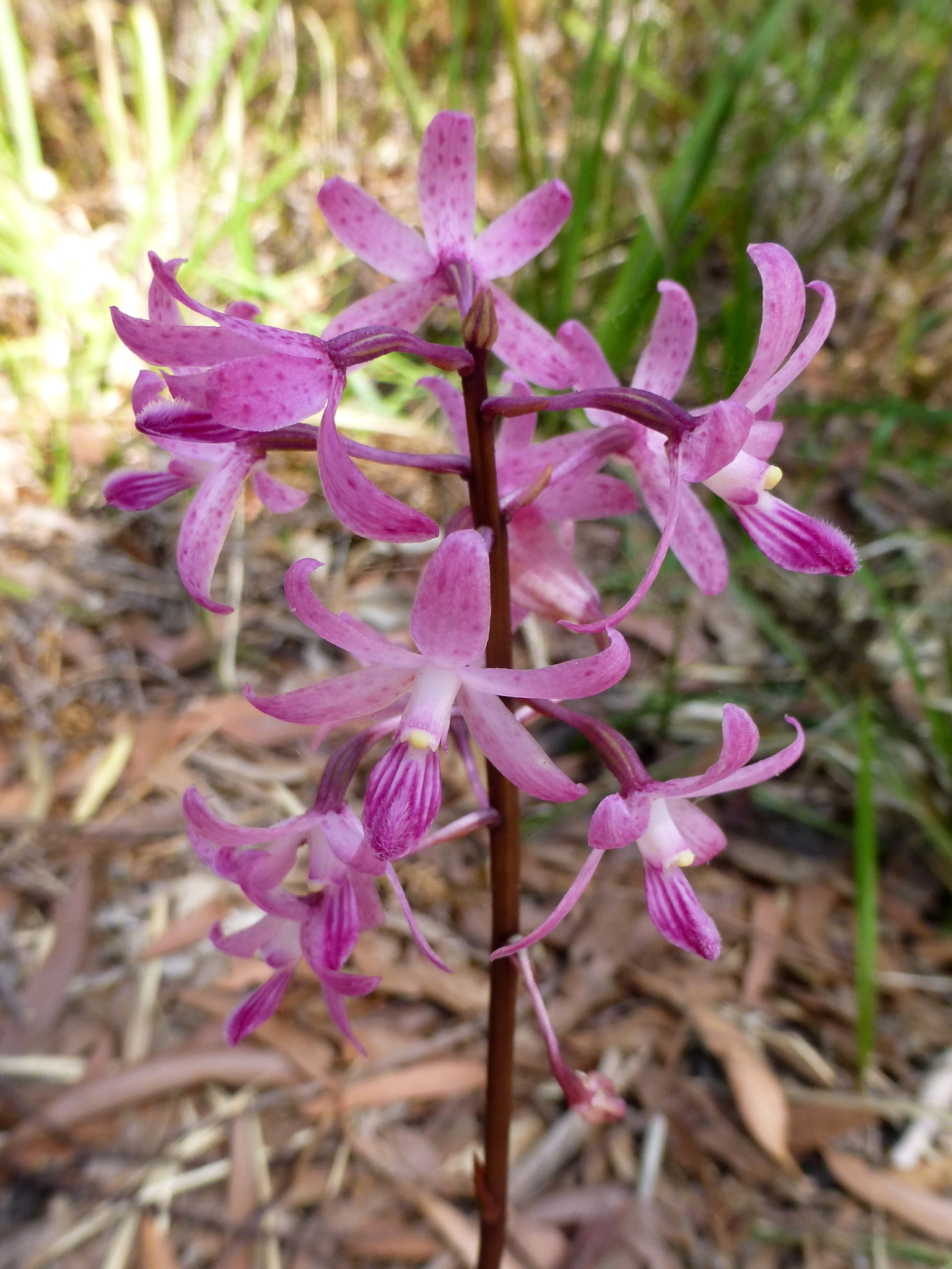
- Dipodium roseum in Lake Conjola

Scientific classification
- Kingdom: Plantae
- Clade: Embryophytes
- Clade: Tracheophytes
- Clade: Spermatophytes
- Clade: Angiosperms
- Clade: Monocots
- Order: Asparagales
- Family: Orchidaceae
- Subfamily: Epidendroideae
- Genus: Dipodium
- Species: D. roseum

Binomial name
- Dipodium roseum D.L.Jones & M.A.Clem.

= Dipodium roseum =

Rosy hyacinth orchid

Species of orchid

Dipodium roseum, commonly known as rosy hyacinth-orchid or pink hyacinth-orchid, is a leafless saprophytic orchid found in east and south-eastern Australia. In summer it produces a tall flowering stem with up to fifty pale pink flowers with small, dark red spots. A widespread and common species it is often confused with D. punctatum but has darker, less heavily spotted flowers.

== Description ==
Dipodium roseum is a leafless, tuberous, perennial, mycoheterotrophic herb. Between fifteen and fifty pale pink flowers with small dark red spots and 20–30 mm (0.8–1 in) wide are borne on a green to dark reddish black flowering stem 40–100 cm (20–40 in) tall. The sepals and petals are linear to elliptic, 13–20 mm (0.5–0.8 in) long, 3–6 mm (0.1–0.2 in) wide and free from each other with their tips curved backwards. The labellum is pink with dark lines, 10–15 mm (0.4–0.6 in) long, 4–6.5 mm (0.2–0.3 in) wide and has three lobes with their tips turned upwards. The centre lobe has a broad band of pink to mauve hairs. A rare white-flowering form also exists. Flowering occurs from November to February.

This orchid is often confused with D. punctatum. D. roseum has a broader band of hairs and striping on its labellum, smaller spots and much more recurved sepals and petals. D. punctatum lacks striping on its labellum, has much more pronounced spotting, and has flat or barely recurved sepals and petals.

== Taxonomy and naming ==
Dipodium roseum was first formally described in 1991 by David Jones and Mark Clements and the description was published in Australian Orchid Research. The type specimen was collected in Montrose in Victoria's Dandenong Ranges. The specific epithet (roseum) is a Latin word meaning "rose-coloured", referring to the colour of the flowers of this orchid. The species was previously included in a wider circumscription of Dipodium punctatum.

== Distribution and habitat ==
The rosy hyacinth orchid grows in a range of habitats from dry woodland to wet forests. It occurs in Queensland south from Gympie, on the coast and ranges of New South Wales and the Australian Capital Territory and in most of Australia where it is the most common Dipodium. It is also found in the south-east of South Australia and is the only member of the genus to occur in Tasmania.

== Ecology ==
Pollination of this species, as for all species in the genus, is by native bees and wasps.

== Cultivation ==
No leafless species of Dipodium has been sustained in cultivation due to the inability to replicate its association with mycorrhizal fungi in a horticultural context.
