= List of Australian plant species described by Robert Brown =

This is a list of Australian plant species authored by Robert Brown, including naturalised species:

== A ==
- Abroma fastuosa R.Br.
- Acacia alata R.Br.
- Acacia biflora R.Br.
- Acacia melanoxylon R.Br.
- Acacia nigricans (Labill.) R.Br.
- Acacia pubescens (Vent.) R.Br.
- Acacia pulchella R.Br.
- Acacia sulcata R.Br.
- Achyranthes arborescens R.Br.
- Acianthus caudatus R.Br.
- Acianthus exsertus R.Br.
- Acianthus fornicatus R.Br.
- Acidonia microcarpa (R.Br.) L.A.S.Johnson & B.G.Briggs
- Acrotriche aggregata R.Br.
- Acrotriche cordata (Labill.) R.Br.
- Acrotriche depressa R.Br.
- Acrotriche divaricata R.Br.
- Acrotriche patula R.Br.
- Acrotriche ramiflora R.Br.
- Acrotriche serrulata R.Br.
- Adenanthos apiculatus R.Br.
- Adenanthos terminalis R.Br.
- Adenosma caerulea R.Br.
- Adiantum formosum R.Br.
- Aegialitis annulata R.Br.
- Agastachys odorata R.Br.
- Agrostis parviflora R.Br.
- Agrostis plebeia R.Br.
- Agrostocrinum scabrum (R.Br.) Baill.
- Ajuga australis R.Br.
- Ajuga sinuata R.Br.
- Alloteropsis semialata (R.Br.) Hitchc.
- Alpinia caerulea (R.Br.) Benth.
- Alstonia scholaris (L.) R.Br.
- Alstonia spectabilis R.Br.
- Alternanthera angustifolia R.Br.
- Alternanthera denticulata R.Br.
- Alternanthera nana R.Br.
- Alternanthera nodiflora R.Br.
- Alternanthera sessilis (L.) R.Br. ex DC.
- Alyxia buxifolia R.Br.
- Alyxia obtusifolia R.Br.
- Alyxia ruscifolia R.Br.
- Alyxia spicata R.Br.
- Amaranthus interruptus R.Br.
- Ammobium alatum R.Br.
- Amphipogon avenaceus R.Br.
- Amphipogon debilis R.Br.
- Amphipogon laguroides R.Br.
- Amphipogon setaceus (R.Br.) T.D.Macfarl.
- Amphipogon strictus R.Br.
- Amphipogon turbinatus R.Br.
- Anarthria gracilis R.Br.
- Anarthria laevis R.Br.
- Anarthria prolifera R.Br.
- Anarthria scabra R.Br.
- Ancistrachne uncinulata (R.Br.) S.T.Blake
- Andersonia caerulea R.Br.
- Andersonia micrantha R.Br.
- Andersonia parvifolia R.Br.
- Andersonia sprengelioides R.Br.
- Aneilema acuminatum R.Br.
- Aneilema biflorum R.Br.
- Aneilema siliculosum R.Br.
- Anisomeles malabarica (L.) R.Br. ex Sims
- Anisomeles salviifolia R.Br.
- Anisopogon avenaceus R.Br.
- Anthobolus filifolius R.Br.
- Anthocercis viscosa R.Br.
- Anthotium humile R.Br.
- Anzybas unguiculatus (R.Br.) D.L.Jones & M.A.Clem.
- Aphelia cyperoides R.Br.
- Apostasia wallichii R.Br. ex Wall.
- Aristida calycina R.Br.
- Aristida hygrometrica R.Br.
- Aristida ramosa R.Br.
- Aristolochia pubera R.Br.
- Arthropodium cirratum (G.Forst.) R.Br.
- Arthropodium fimbriatum R.Br.
- Arthropodium minus R.Br.
- Arthropodium strictum R.Br.
- Arthrostylis aphylla R.Br.
- Asplenium attenuatum R.Br.
- Asplenium difforme R.Br.
- Asplenium paleaceum R.Br.
- Astelia alpina R.Br.
- Astroloma compactum R.Br.
- Astroloma humifusum (Cav.) R.Br.
- Astroloma pallidum R.Br.
- Astroloma pinifolium (R.Br.) Benth.
- Astroloma prostratum R.Br.
- Astroloma tectum R.Br.
- Atriplex paludosa R.Br.
- Atriplex pumilio R.Br.
- Atriplex semibaccata R.Br.
- Austrocynoglossum latifolium (R.Br.) Popov ex R.R.Mill
- Austrodanthonia pilosa (R.Br.) H.P.Linder
- Austrodanthonia racemosa (R.Br.) H.P.Linder
- Austrodanthonia setacea (R.Br.) H.P.Linder
- Austrostipa compressa (R.Br.) S.W.L.Jacobs & J.Everett
- Austrostipa mollis (R.Br.) S.W.L.Jacobs & J.Everett
- Austrostipa pubescens (R.Br.) S.W.L.Jacobs & J.Everett
- Austrostipa semibarbata (R.Br.) S.W.L.Jacobs & J.Everett
- Austrostipa setacea (R.Br.) S.W.L.Jacobs & J.Everett
- Azolla pinnata R.Br.

== B ==
- Bacopa floribunda (R.Br.) Wettst.
- Baloskion australe (R.Br.) B.G.Briggs & L.A.S.Johnson
- Baloskion gracile (R.Br.) B.G.Briggs & L.A.S.Johnson
- Baloskion pallens (R.Br.) B.G.Briggs & L.A.S.Johnson
- Banksia aemula R.Br.
- Banksia attenuata R.Br.
- Banksia baueri R.Br.
- Banksia baxteri R.Br.
- Banksia brownii Baxter ex R.Br.
- Banksia caleyi R.Br.
- Banksia coccinea R.Br.
- Banksia goodii R.Br.
- Banksia ilicifolia R.Br.
- Banksia littoralis R.Br.
- Banksia media R.Br.
- Banksia menziesii R.Br.
- Banksia nutans R.Br.
- Banksia occidentalis R.Br.
- Banksia paludosa R.Br.
- Banksia pulchella R.Br.
- Banksia quercifolia R.Br.
- Banksia solandri R.Br.
- Banksia speciosa R.Br.
- Banksia sphaerocarpa R.Br.
- Banksia verticillata R.Br.
- Barringtonia calyptrata (R.Br. ex Miers) R.Br. ex F.M.Bailey
- Baumea articulata (R.Br.) S.T.Blake
- Baumea juncea (R.Br.) Palla
- Baumea teretifolia (R.Br.) Palla
- Beaufortia decussata R.Br.
- Beaufortia sparsa R.Br.
- Bellendena montana R.Br.
- Blandfordia grandiflora R.Br.
- Blechnum fluviatile (R.Br.) Lowe ex Salomon
- Blechnum minus (R.Br.) Ettingsh.
- Blechnum patersonii (R.Br.) Mett.
- Blennodia canescens R.Br.
- Blumea diffusa R.Br. ex Benth.
- Boerhavia mutabilis R.Br.
- Bonamia linearis (R.Br.) Hallier f.
- Bonamia media (R.Br.) Hallier f.
- Bonamia pannosa (R.Br.) Hallier f.
- Boronia albiflora R.Br. ex Benth.
- Borya sphaerocephala R.Br.
- Bossiaea cinerea R.Br.
- Bossiaea dentata (R.Br.) Benth.
- Bossiaea linophylla R.Br.
- Bossiaea prostrata R.Br.
- Bossiaea rufa R.Br.
- Botrychium australe R.Br.
- Brachyachne tenella (R.Br.) C.E.Hubb.
- Brachychiton diversifolius R.Br.
- Brachychiton incanus R.Br.
- Brachychiton populneus (Schott & Endl.) R.Br.
- Brachyloma ciliatum (R.Br.) Benth.
- Brunonia australis Sm. ex R.Br.
- Brunoniella acaulis (R.Br.) Bremek.
- Brunoniella pumilio (R.Br.) Bremek.
- Buchnera asperata R.Br.
- Buchnera gracilis R.Br.
- Buchnera linearis R.Br.
- Buchnera ramosissima R.Br.
- Buchnera tenella R.Br.
- Buchnera tetragona R.Br.
- Buchnera urticifolia R.Br.
- Bulbine bulbosa (R.Br.) Haw.
- Bulbine semibarbata (R.Br.) Haw.
- Burchardia umbellata R.Br.
- Burmannia juncea R.Br.

== C ==
- Caesia occidentalis R.Br.
- Caesia parviflora R.Br.
- Caladenia alata R.Br.
- Caladenia carnea R.Br.
- Caladenia congesta R.Br.
- Caladenia filamentosa R.Br.
- Caladenia flava R.Br.
- Caladenia gracilis R.Br.
- Caladenia latifolia R.Br.
- Caladenia patersonii R.Br.
- Caladenia testacea R.Br.
- Caleana major R.Br.
- Caleana minor R.Br.
- Calectasia cyanea R.Br.
- Callicarpa pedunculata R.Br.
- Callistemon rigidus R.Br.
- Calochilus campestris R.Br.
- Calochilus paludosus R.Br.
- Calochlaena dubia (R.Br.) M.D.Turner & R.A.White
- Calostemma purpureum R.Br.
- Calothamnus gracilis R.Br.
- Calothamnus quadrifidus R.Br.
- Calothamnus villosus R.Br.
- Calotis cuneifolia R.Br.
- Calotis dentex R.Br.
- Calystegia sepium (L.) R.Br.
- Canscora diffusa (Vahl) R.Br. ex Roem. & Schult.
- Capillipedium parviflorum (R.Br.) Stapf
- Capparis lasiantha R.Br. ex DC.
- Capparis lucida (DC.) R.Br. ex Benth.
- Carex appressa R.Br.
- Carex breviculmis R.Br.
- Carex cataractae R.Br.
- Carex chlorantha R.Br.
- Carex inversa R.Br.
- Carex inversa R.Br. f. inversa
- Carissa lanceolata R.Br.
- Carissa ovata R.Br.
- Carpha alpina R.Br.
- Cartonema spicatum R.Br.
- Cassinia aculeata (Labill.) R.Br.
- Cassinia arcuata R.Br.
- Cassinia denticulata R.Br.
- Cassinia laevis R.Br.
- Cassinia longifolia R.Br.
- Cassinia quinquefaria R.Br.
- Cassytha glabella R.Br.
- Cassytha glabella R.Br. f. glabella
- Cassytha melantha R.Br.
- Cassytha pubescens R.Br.
- Caustis dioica R.Br.
- Caustis flexuosa R.Br.
- Caustis pentandra R.Br.
- Cenchrus australis R.Br.
- Centranthera hispida R.Br.
- Centrolepis aristata (R.Br.) Roem. & Schult.
- Centrolepis banksii (R.Br.) Roem. & Schult.
- Centrolepis exserta (R.Br.) Roem. & Schult.
- Centrolepis mutica (R.Br.) Hieron.
- Centrolepis polygyna (R.Br.) Hieron.
- Centrolepis pulvinata (R.Br.) Roem. & Schult.
- Centrolepis pusilla (R.Br.) Roem. & Schult.
- Centrolepis strigosa (R.Br.) Roem. & Schult.
- Chaetanthus aristatus (R.Br.) B.G.Briggs & L.A.S.Johnson
- Chaetanthus leptocarpoides R.Br.
- Chamaeraphis hordeacea R.Br.
- Chamaescilla corymbosa (R.Br.) F.Muell. ex Benth.
- Cheilanthes caudata R.Br.
- Cheilanthes distans (R.Br.) Mett.
- Cheilanthes nitida (R.Br.) P.S.Green
- Cheilanthes nudiuscula (R.Br.) T.Moore
- Cheilanthes pumilio (R.Br.) F.Muell.
- Chenopodium carinatum R.Br.
- Chenopodium erosum R.Br.
- Chenopodium pumilio R.Br.
- Chiloglottis diphylla R.Br.
- Chiloterus gibbosus (R.Br.) D.L.Jones & M.A.Clem.
- Chionanthus axillaris R.Br.
- Chloanthes glandulosa R.Br.
- Chloanthes stoechadis R.Br.
- Chloris divaricata R.Br.
- Chloris pumilio R.Br.
- Chloris truncata R.Br.
- Chloris ventricosa R.Br.
- Chlorophytum laxum R.Br.
- Chordifex crispatus (R.Br.) B.G.Briggs & L.A.S.Johnson
- Chordifex dimorphus (R.Br.) B.G.Briggs
- Chordifex fastigiatus (R.Br.) B.G.Briggs
- Chordifex laxus (R.Br.) B.G.Briggs & L.A.S.Johnson
- Chordifex monocephalus (R.Br.) B.G.Briggs
- Chordifex sphacelatus (R.Br.) B.G.Briggs & L.A.S.Johnson
- Choretrum glomeratum R.Br.
- Choretrum lateriflorum R.Br.
- Chorizandra cymbaria R.Br.
- Chorizandra sphaerocephala R.Br.
- Chorizema rhombeum R.Br.
- Chrysopogon pallidus (R.Br.) Steud.
- Clematis aristata R.Br. ex Ker Gawl.
- Clerodendrum costatum R.Br.
- Clerodendrum floribundum R.Br.
- Clerodendrum tomentosum (Vent.) R.Br.
- Coelachne pulchella R.Br.
- Commelina cyanea R.Br.
- Commelina ensifolia R.Br.
- Commelina lanceolata R.Br.
- Commelina undulata R.Br.
- Conospermum caeruleum R.Br.
- Conospermum capitatum R.Br.
- Conospermum distichum R.Br.
- Conospermum flexuosum R.Br.
- Conospermum huegelii R.Br. ex Endl.
- Conospermum petiolare R.Br.
- Conospermum tenuifolium R.Br.
- Conospermum teretifolium R.Br.
- Conospermum triplinervium R.Br.
- Conostylis aculeata R.Br.
- Conostylis breviscapa R.Br.
- Conostylis serrulata R.Br.
- Conostylis setigera R.Br.
- Convolvulus angustissimus R.Br.
- Convolvulus remotus R.Br.
- Coopernookia barbata (R.Br.) Carolin
- Corchorus pumilio R.Br. ex Benth.
- Cordyline cannifolia R.Br.
- Corybas fimbriatus (R.Br.) Rchb.f.
- Corymbia grandifolia (R.Br. ex Benth.) K.D.Hill & L.A.S.Johnson
- Corynotheca lateriflora (R.Br.) F.Muell. ex Benth.
- Cosmelia rubra R.Br.
- Crepidomanes venosum (R.Br.) Bostock
- Crinum angustifolium R.Br.
- Crinum pedunculatum R.Br.
- Crinum venosum R.Br.
- Crotalaria cunninghamii R.Br.
- Cryptocarya glaucescens R.Br.
- Cryptocarya obovata R.Br.
- Cryptocarya triplinervis R.Br.
- Cryptostegia grandiflora Roxb. ex R.Br.
- Cryptostylis erecta R.Br.
- Cryptostylis ovata R.Br.
- Culcita dubia (R.Br.) Maxon
- Curculigo ensifolia R.Br.
- Cuscuta australis R.Br.
- Cyanicula caerulea (R.Br.) Hopper & A.P.Br.
- Cyanicula deformis (R.Br.) Hopper & A.P.Br.
- Cyathea australis (R.Br.) Domin
- Cyathochaeta avenacea (R.Br.) Benth.
- Cyathochaeta clandestina (R.Br.) Benth.
- Cyathochaeta diandra (R.Br.) Nees
- Cyathodes dealbata R.Br.
- Cyathodes straminea R.Br.
- Cycas angulata R.Br.
- Cycas media R.Br.
- Cymbidium canaliculatum R.Br.
- Cymbidium suave R.Br.
- Cymbopogon bombycinus (R.Br.) Domin
- Cymbopogon procerus (R.Br.) Domin
- Cymbopogon refractus (R.Br.) A.Camus
- Cymodocea serrulata (R.Br.) Asch. & Magnus
- Cynanchum carnosum (R.Br.) Schltr.
- Cynanchum floribundum R.Br.
- Cynanchum pedunculatum R.Br.
- Cynoglossum australe R.Br.
- Cynoglossum suaveolens R.Br.
- Cyperus alterniflorus R.Br.
- Cyperus angustatus R.Br.
- Cyperus aquatilis R.Br.
- Cyperus breviculmis R.Br.
- Cyperus carinatus R.Br.
- Cyperus concinnus R.Br.
- Cyperus conicus (R.Br.) Boeck.
- Cyperus decompositus (R.Br.) F.Muell.
- Cyperus enervis R.Br.
- Cyperus flaccidus R.Br.
- Cyperus fulvus R.Br.
- Cyperus gracilis R.Br.
- Cyperus holoschoenus R.Br.
- Cyperus imbecillis R.Br.
- Cyperus laevis R.Br.
- Cyperus lucidus R.Br.
- Cyperus microcephalus R.Br.
- Cyperus ornatus R.Br.
- Cyperus pedunculatus (R.Br.) J.H.Kern
- Cyperus platystylis R.Br.
- Cyperus pulchellus R.Br.
- Cyperus scaber (R.Br.) Boeck.
- Cyperus scariosus R.Br.
- Cyperus sexflorus R.Br.
- Cyperus sporobolus R.Br.
- Cyperus subulatus R.Br.
- Cyperus tetraphyllus R.Br.
- Cyperus trinervis R.Br.
- Cyperus unioloides R.Br.
- Cyperus vaginatus R.Br.
- Cyperus ventricosus R.Br.
- Cyrtostylis reniformis R.Br.

== D ==
- Dactyloctenium radulans (R.Br.) P.Beauv.
- Damasonium minus (R.Br.) Buchenau
- Dampiera fasciculata R.Br.
- Dampiera ferruginea R.Br.
- Dampiera hederacea R.Br.
- Dampiera incana R.Br.
- Dampiera linearis R.Br.
- Dampiera parvifolia R.Br.
- Dampiera purpurea R.Br.
- Dampiera stricta (Sm.) R.Br.
- Danthonia longifolia R.Br.
- Danthonia pauciflora R.Br.
- Danthonia semiannularis (Labill.) R.Br.
- Dapsilanthus elatior (R.Br.) B.G.Briggs & L.A.S.Johnson
- Dapsilanthus ramosus (R.Br.) B.G.Briggs & L.A.S.Johnson
- Dapsilanthus spathaceus (R.Br.) B.G.Briggs & L.A.S.Johnson
- Dasypogon bromeliifolius R.Br.
- Daviesia latifolia R.Br.
- Daviesia mimosoides R.Br.
- Daviesia teretifolia R.Br. ex Benth.
- Deeringia arborescens (R.Br.) Druce
- Dendrobium canaliculatum R.Br.
- Dennstaedtia davallioides (R.Br.) T.Moore
- Deplanchea tetraphylla (R.Br.) F.Muell.
- Desmocladus fasciculatus (R.Br.) B.G.Briggs & L.A.S.Johnson
- Desmocladus flexuosus (R.Br.) B.G.Briggs & L.A.S.Johnson
- Deyeuxia decipiens (R.Br.) Vickery
- Dianella congesta R.Br.
- Dianella longifolia R.Br.
- Dianella rara R.Br.
- Dianella revoluta R.Br.
- Diaspasis filifolia R.Br.
- Dichanthium sericeum (R.Br.) A.Camus
- Dichanthium tenue (R.Br.) A.Camus
- Dichelachne rara (R.Br.) Vickery
- Digitaria divaricatissima (R.Br.) Hughes
- Digitaria gibbosa (R.Br.) P.Beauv.
- Digitaria papposa (R.Br.) P.Beauv.
- Digitaria parviflora (R.Br.) Hughes
- Dillwynia cinerascens R.Br.
- Dillwynia parvifolia R.Br. ex Sims
- Dimeria acinaciformis R.Br.
- Dioscorea transversa R.Br.
- Diospyros australis (R.Br.) Hiern
- Diospyros compacta (R.Br.) Kosterm.
- Diospyros littorea (R.Br.) Kosterm.
- Diplachne parviflora (R.Br.) Benth.
- Diplazium australe (R.Br.) N.A.Wakef.
- Dipodium punctatum (Sm.) R.Br.
- Dipteracanthus bracteatus (R.Br.) Nees
- Dischidia nummularia R.Br.
- Dissocarpus paradoxus (R.Br.) Ulbr.
- Diuris alba R.Br.
- Diuris emarginata R.Br.
- Diuris longifolia R.Br.
- Diuris pauciflora R.Br.
- Diuris pedunculata R.Br.
- Diuris setacea R.Br.
- Diuris sulphurea R.Br.
- Dockrillia rigida (R.Br.) Rauschert
- Dockrillia teretifolia (R.Br.) Brieger
- Dolichandrone alternifolia (R.Br.) F.M.Bailey
- Dolichandrone heterophylla (R.Br.) F.Muell.
- Doodia aspera R.Br.
- Doodia caudata (Cav.) R.Br.
- Doodia media R.Br.
- Dracophyllum secundum R.Br.
- Drosera menziesii R.Br. ex DC.
- Dryandra arctotidis R.Br.
- Dryandra armata R.Br.
- Dryandra baxteri R.Br.
- Dryandra bipinnatifida R.Br.
- Dryandra blechnifolia R.Br.
- Dryandra calophylla R.Br.
- Dryandra concinna R.Br.
- Dryandra cuneata R.Br.
- Dryandra falcata R.Br.
- Dryandra foliolata R.Br.
- Dryandra formosa R.Br.
- Dryandra fraseri R.Br.
- Dryandra longifolia R.Br.
- Dryandra mucronulata R.Br.
- Dryandra nervosa R.Br.
- Dryandra nivea (Labill.) R.Br.
- Dryandra obtusa R.Br.
- Dryandra plumosa R.Br.
- Dryandra pteridifolia R.Br.
- Dryandra seneciifolia R.Br.
- Dryandra serra R.Br.
- Dryandra squarrosa R.Br.
- Dryandra tenuifolia R.Br.
- Drymophila cyanocarpa R.Br.
- Duboisia myoporoides R.Br.
- Dysphania littoralis R.Br.

== E ==
- Ectrosia leporina R.Br.
- Ehretia acuminata R.Br.
- Ehretia membranifolia R.Br.
- Ehretia saligna R.Br.
- Einadia hastata (R.Br.) A.J.Scott
- Einadia nutans (R.Br.) A.J.Scott
- Eleocharis acuta R.Br.
- Eleocharis atricha R.Br.
- Eleocharis gracilis R.Br.
- Eleocharis pusilla R.Br.
- Eleocharis sphacelata R.Br.
- Elymus scaber (R.Br.) A.Love
- Elymus scabrus (R.Br.) A.Love
- Elyonurus citreus (R.Br.) Munro ex Benth.
- Enchylaena tomentosa R.Br.
- Endiandra glauca R.Br.
- Enneapogon gracilis (R.Br.) P.Beauv.
- Enneapogon nigricans (R.Br.) P.Beauv.
- Enneapogon pallidus (R.Br.) P.Beauv.
- Enneapogon purpurascens (R.Br.) P.Beauv.
- Entolasia marginata (R.Br.) Hughes
- Entolasia stricta (R.Br.) Hughes
- Epacris crassifolia R.Br.
- Epacris exserta R.Br.
- Epacris microphylla R.Br.
- Epacris mucronulata R.Br.
- Epacris paludosa R.Br.
- Epacris serpyllifolia R.Br.
- Epacris sparsa R.Br.
- Epiblema grandiflorum R.Br.
- Eragrostis concinna (R.Br.) Steud.
- Eragrostis leptostachya (R.Br.) Steud.
- Eragrostis parviflora (R.Br.) Trin.
- Eragrostis pubescens (R.Br.) Steud.
- Eragrostis stenostachya (R.Br.) Steud.
- Eremophila alternifolia R.Br.
- Eremophila glabra (R.Br.) Ostenf.
- Eremophila longifolia (R.Br.) F.Muell.
- Eremophila oppositifolia R.Br.
- Eremophila scoparia (R.Br.) F.Muell.
- Eremophila sturtii R.Br.
- Eriachne avenacea R.Br.
- Eriachne capillaris R.Br.
- Eriachne ciliata R.Br.
- Eriachne glauca R.Br.
- Eriachne mucronata R.Br.
- Eriachne obtusa R.Br.
- Eriachne pallescens R.Br.
- Eriachne rara R.Br.
- Eriachne squarrosa R.Br.
- Eriocaulon australe R.Br.
- Eriocaulon cinereum R.Br.
- Eriocaulon depressum R.Br. ex Sm.
- Eriocaulon nanum R.Br.
- Eriocaulon nigricans R.Br.
- Eriocaulon pallidum R.Br.
- Eriocaulon pusillum R.Br.
- Ervatamia orientalis (R.Br.) Domin
- Ervatamia pubescens (R.Br.) Domin
- Erythroxylum ellipticum R.Br. ex Benth.
- Eucalyptus grandifolia R.Br. ex Benth.
- Eucalyptus tetragona (R.Br.) F.Muell.
- Euphrasia arguta R.Br.
- Euphrasia collina R.Br.
- Euphrasia scabra R.Br.
- Euphrasia striata R.Br.
- Eupomatia laurina R.Br.
- Eurychorda complanata (R.Br.) B.G.Briggs & L.A.S.Johnson
- Eustrephus latifolius R.Br. ex Ker Gawl.
- Eutaxia microphylla (R.Br.) C.H.Wright & Dewar
- Evandra aristata R.Br.
- Evandra pauciflora R.Br.
- Exocarpos aphyllus R.Br.
- Exocarpos humifusus R.Br.
- Exocarpos latifolius R.Br.
- Exocarpos sparteus R.Br.
- Exocarpos strictus R.Br.

== F ==
- Festuca plebeia R.Br.
- Fimbristylis acicularis R.Br.
- Fimbristylis caespitosa R.Br.
- Fimbristylis cymosa R.Br.
- Fimbristylis cyperoides R.Br.
- Fimbristylis denudata R.Br.
- Fimbristylis depauperata R.Br.
- Fimbristylis furva R.Br.
- Fimbristylis pauciflora R.Br.
- Fimbristylis polytrichoides (Retz.) R.Br.
- Fimbristylis pterigosperma R.Br.
- Fimbristylis punctata R.Br.
- Fimbristylis rara R.Br.
- Fimbristylis sericea R.Br.
- Fimbristylis spiralis R.Br.
- Fimbristylis tetragona R.Br.
- Fimbristylis tristachya R.Br.
- Fimbristylis velata R.Br.
- Fimbristylis xyridis R.Br.
- Flindersia australis R.Br.
- Franklandia fucifolia R.Br.
- Fuirena arenosa R.Br.

== G ==
- Gahnia aspera (R.Br.) Spreng.
- Gahnia decomposita (R.Br.) Benth.
- Gahnia deusta (R.Br.) Benth.
- Gahnia erythrocarpa R.Br.
- Gahnia lanigera (R.Br.) Benth.
- Gahnia melanocarpa R.Br.
- Gahnia radula (R.Br.) Benth.
- Gastrodia sesamoides R.Br.
- Gastrolobium bilobum R.Br.
- Gastrolobium latifolium (R.Br.) G.Chandler & Crisp
- Gaultheria hispida R.Br.
- Geitonoplesium cymosum (R.Br.) A.Cunn. ex R.Br.
- Genoplesium baueri R.Br.
- Gleichenia alpina R.Br.
- Gleichenia dicarpa R.Br.
- Gleichenia microphylla R.Br.
- Gleichenia rupestris R.Br.
- Glossodia major R.Br.
- Glossodia minor R.Br.
- Glyceria fluitans (L.) R.Br.
- Gompholobium marginatum R.Br.
- Gompholobium polymorphum R.Br.
- Gompholobium venustum R.Br.
- Gomphrena canescens R.Br.
- Gomphrena conica (R.Br.) Spreng.
- Gomphrena diffusa (R.Br.) Spreng.
- Gomphrena flaccida R.Br.
- Gomphrena humilis R.Br.
- Gomphrena lanata R.Br.
- Goodenia coerulea R.Br.
- Goodenia coronopifolia R.Br.
- Goodenia cycloptera R.Br.
- Goodenia decurrens R.Br.
- Goodenia filiformis R.Br.
- Goodenia geniculata R.Br.
- Goodenia glabra R.Br.
- Goodenia gracilis R.Br.
- Goodenia hispida R.Br.
- Goodenia humilis R.Br.
- Goodenia incana R.Br.
- Goodenia lanata R.Br.
- Goodenia pilosa (R.Br.) Carolin
- Goodenia pterigosperma R.Br.
- Goodenia pumilio R.Br.
- Goodenia purpurascens R.Br.
- Goodenia quadrilocularis R.Br.
- Goodenia rotundifolia R.Br.
- Goodenia scapigera R.Br.
- Goodenia stelligera R.Br.
- Goodenia varia R.Br.
- Goodenia viscida R.Br.
- Gratiola pedunculata R.Br.
- Gratiola pubescens R.Br.
- Grevillea agrifolia A.Cunn. ex R.Br.
- Grevillea anethifolia R.Br.
- Grevillea angulata R.Br.
- Grevillea arenaria R.Br.
- Grevillea aspera R.Br.
- Grevillea australis R.Br.
- Grevillea banksii R.Br.
- Grevillea baueri R.Br.
- Grevillea baxteri R.Br.
- Grevillea bipinnatifida R.Br.
- Grevillea buxifolia (Sm.) R.Br.
- Grevillea caleyi R.Br.
- Grevillea concinna R.Br.
- Grevillea crithmifolia R.Br.
- Grevillea cunninghamii R.Br.
- Grevillea depauperata R.Br.
- Grevillea dilatata (R.Br.) Downing
- Grevillea divaricata R.Br.
- Grevillea dryandri R.Br.
- Grevillea fasciculata R.Br.
- Grevillea floribunda R.Br.
- Grevillea × gaudichaudii R.Br. ex Gaudich.
- Grevillea goodii R.Br.
- Grevillea heliosperma R.Br.
- Grevillea ilicifolia (R.Br.) R.Br.
- Grevillea juniperina R.Br.
- Grevillea lanigera A.Cunn. ex R.Br.
- Grevillea longifolia R.Br.
- Grevillea mimosoides R.Br.
- Grevillea montana R.Br.
- Grevillea mucronulata R.Br.
- Grevillea obtusiflora R.Br.
- Grevillea occidentalis R.Br.
- Grevillea parviflora R.Br.
- Grevillea pauciflora R.Br.
- Grevillea pectinata R.Br.
- Grevillea phylicoides R.Br.
- Grevillea pulchella (R.Br.) Meisn.
- Grevillea pungens R.Br.
- Grevillea pyramidalis A.Cunn. ex R.Br.
- Grevillea quercifolia R.Br.
- Grevillea refracta R.Br.
- Grevillea robusta A.Cunn. ex R.Br.
- Grevillea sericea (Sm.) R.Br.
- Grevillea sphacelata R.Br.
- Grevillea striata R.Br.
- Grevillea synapheae R.Br.
- Grevillea trifida (R.Br.) Meisn.
- Grevillea triternata R.Br.
- Grevillea venusta R.Br.
- Gymnanthera nitida R.Br.
- Gymnema geminatum R.Br.
- Gymnoschoenus anceps (R.Br.) C.B.Clarke
- Gymnoschoenus sphaerocephalus (R.Br.) Hook.f.
- Gymnostachys anceps R.Br.

== H ==
- Habenaria elongata R.Br.
- Habenaria ochroleuca R.Br.
- Haemodorum coccineum R.Br.
- Haemodorum laxum R.Br.
- Haemodorum planifolium R.Br.
- Haemodorum spicatum R.Br.
- Hakea adnata R.Br.
- Hakea amplexicaulis R.Br.
- Hakea arborescens R.Br.
- Hakea baxteri R.Br.
- Hakea ceratophylla (Sm.) R.Br.
- Hakea cinerea R.Br.
- Hakea corymbosa R.Br.
- Hakea cristata R.Br.
- Hakea cucullata R.Br.
- Hakea cycloptera R.Br.
- Hakea decurrens R.Br.
- Hakea denticulata R.Br.
- Hakea elliptica (Sm.) R.Br.
- Hakea eriantha R.Br.
- Hakea falcata R.Br.
- Hakea florida R.Br.
- Hakea fraseri R.Br.
- Hakea ilicifolia R.Br.
- Hakea incrassata R.Br.
- Hakea lasiantha R.Br.
- Hakea lasiocarpha R.Br.
- Hakea laurina R.Br.
- Hakea leucoptera R.Br.
- Hakea linearis R.Br.
- Hakea lissocarpha R.Br.
- Hakea lissosperma R.Br.
- Hakea lorea (R.Br.) R.Br.
- Hakea macrocarpa A.Cunn. ex R.Br.
- Hakea marginata R.Br.
- Hakea microcarpa R.Br.
- Hakea nitida R.Br.
- Hakea nodosa R.Br.
- Hakea obliqua R.Br.
- Hakea oleifolia (Sm.) R.Br.
- Hakea pandanicarpa R.Br.
- Hakea prostrata R.Br.
- Hakea rugosa R.Br.
- Hakea stenocarpa R.Br.
- Hakea stenophylla A.Cunn. ex R.Br.
- Hakea sulcata R.Br.
- Hakea tephrosperma R.Br.
- Hakea trifurcata (Sm.) R.Br.
- Hakea tuberculata R.Br.
- Hakea ulicina R.Br.
- Hakea undulata R.Br.
- Hakea varia R.Br.
- Hakea vittata R.Br.
- Halophila ovalis (R.Br.) Hook.f.
- Halophila spinulosa (R.Br.) Asch.
- Haloragis stricta R.Br. ex Benth.
- Heliotropium asperrimum R.Br.
- Heliotropium bracteatum R.Br.
- Heliotropium fasciculatum R.Br.
- Heliotropium foliatum R.Br.
- Heliotropium glabellum R.Br.
- Heliotropium paniculatum R.Br.
- Heliotropium pauciflorum R.Br.
- Heliotropium prostratum R.Br.
- Heliotropium tenuifolium R.Br.
- Heliotropium ventricosum R.Br.
- Hemarthria uncinata R.Br.
- Hemiandra pungens R.Br.
- Hemichroa diandra R.Br.
- Hemichroa pentandra R.Br.
- Hemigenia purpurea R.Br.
- Heterachne abortiva (R.Br.) Druce
- Heteropogon triticeus (R.Br.) Stapf
- Hibbertia sericea (R.Br. ex DC.) Benth.
- Hierochloe redolens (Vahl) R.Br. ex Roem. & Schult.
- Hovea linearis (Sm.) R.Br.
- Hovea longifolia R.Br.
- Hoya australis R.Br. ex Trail
- Hoya carnosa (L.) R.Br.
- Huperzia varia (R.Br.) Trevis.
- Hydrocotyle hirta R.Br. ex A.Rich.
- Hygrophila angustifolia R.Br.
- Hymenophyllum rarum R.Br.
- Hypoestes floribunda R.Br.
- Hypolaena exsulca R.Br.
- Hypolaena fastigiata R.Br.
- Hypoxis glabella R.Br.
- Hypoxis marginata R.Br.
- Hypoxis pratensis R.Br.

== I ==
- Ipomoea abrupta R.Br.
- Ipomoea diversifolia R.Br.
- Ipomoea eriocarpa R.Br.
- Ipomoea gracilis R.Br.
- Ipomoea graminea R.Br.
- Ipomoea incisa R.Br.
- Ipomoea pes-caprae (L.) R.Br.
- Ipomoea plebeia R.Br.
- Ipomoea velutina R.Br.
- Isachne australis R.Br.
- Ischaemum australe R.Br.
- Ischaemum fragile R.Br.
- Ischaemum triticeum R.Br.
- Isolepis cyperoides R.Br.
- Isolepis fluitans (L.) R.Br.
- Isolepis inundata R.Br.
- Isolepis nodosa (Rottb.) R.Br.
- Isolepis prolifera (Rottb.) R.Br.
- Isolepis setacea (L.) R.Br.
- Isopogon asper R.Br.
- Isopogon attenuatus R.Br.
- Isopogon axillaris R.Br.
- Isopogon baxteri R.Br.
- Isopogon buxifolius R.Br.
- Isopogon ceratophyllus R.Br.
- Isopogon cuneatus R.Br.
- Isopogon divergens R.Br.
- Isopogon dubius (R.Br.) Druce
- Isopogon formosus R.Br.
- Isopogon latifolius R.Br.
- Isopogon longifolius R.Br.
- Isopogon petiolaris R.Br.
- Isopogon polycephalus R.Br.
- Isopogon teretifolius R.Br.
- Isopogon trilobus R.Br.
- Isopogon uncinatus R.Br.
- Isotoma fluviatilis (R.Br.) F.Muell. ex Benth.
- Isotoma hypocrateriformis (R.Br.) Druce
- Isotoma scapigera (R.Br.) G.Don
- Ixiochlamys cuneifolia (R.Br.) Sond.
- Ixodia achillaeoides R.Br.

== J ==
- Jacksonia spinosa (Labill.) R.Br. ex Sm.
- Jasminum aemulum R.Br.
- Jasminum molle R.Br.
- Johnsonia lupulina R.Br.
- Josephinia grandiflora R.Br.
- Joycea pallida (R.Br.) Linder
- Juncus holoschoenus R.Br.
- Juncus pallidus R.Br.
- Juncus pauciflorus R.Br.
- Juncus planifolius R.Br.
- Juncus prismatocarpus R.Br.
- Juncus revolutus R.Br.
- Juncus vaginatus R.Br.

== K ==
- Kailarsenia suffruticosa (R.Br. ex Benth.) Puttock
- Kennedia prostrata R.Br.
- Kingia australis R.Br.

== L ==
- Lablab prostrata R.Br.
- Lachnagrostis aemula (R.Br.) Trin.
- Lachnagrostis billardierei (R.Br.) Trin.
- Lachnagrostis plebeia (R.Br.) Trin.
- Lambertia echinata R.Br.
- Lambertia ericifolia R.Br.
- Lambertia inermis R.Br.
- Lambertia uniflora R.Br.
- Lasiopetalum rufum R.Br. ex Benth.
- Lastreopsis decomposita (R.Br.) Tindale
- Lastreopsis tenera (R.Br.) Tindale
- Laxmannia gracilis R.Br.
- Laxmannia minor R.Br.
- Lechenaultia expansa R.Br.
- Lechenaultia filiformis R.Br.
- Lechenaultia formosa R.Br.
- Lechenaultia tubiflora R.Br.
- Leichhardtia australis R.Br.
- Leonotis (Pers.) R.Br.
- Leonotis leonurus (L.) R.Br.
- Leonotis nepetifolia (L.) R.Br.
- Lepidosperma angustatum R.Br.
- Lepidosperma aphyllum R.Br.
- Lepidosperma concavum R.Br.
- Lepidosperma congestum R.Br.
- Lepidosperma exaltatum R.Br.
- Lepidosperma flexuosum R.Br.
- Lepidosperma gracile R.Br.
- Lepidosperma laterale R.Br.
- Lepidosperma lineare R.Br.
- Lepidosperma striatum R.Br.
- Lepidosperma viscidum R.Br.
- Lepistemon urceolatum (R.Br.) F.Muell.
- Leptaspis banksii R.Br.
- Leptocarpus tenax (Labill.) R.Br.
- Leptoceras menziesii (R.Br.) Lindl.
- Leptochloa decipiens (R.Br.) Maiden
- Leptochloa digitata (R.Br.) Domin
- Leptomeria acida R.Br.
- Leptomeria aphylla R.Br.
- Leptomeria axillaris R.Br.
- Leptomeria pauciflora R.Br.
- Leptomeria scrobiculata R.Br.
- Leptomeria squarrulosa R.Br.
- Leptosema uniflorum (R.Br. ex Benth.) Crisp
- Lepturus repens (G.Forst.) R.Br.
- Lepyrodia hermaphrodita R.Br.
- Lepyrodia scariosa R.Br.
- Leucas martinicensis R.Br.
- Leucas zeylanica (L.) R.Br.
- Leucopogon acuminatus R.Br.
- Leucopogon alternifolius R.Br.
- Leucopogon amplexicaulis (Rudge) R.Br.
- Leucopogon apiculatus R.Br.
- Leucopogon appressus R.Br.
- Leucopogon assimilis R.Br.
- Leucopogon australis R.Br.
- Leucopogon biflorus R.Br.
- Leucopogon carinatus R.Br.
- Leucopogon collinus (Labill.) R.Br.
- Leucopogon cucullatus R.Br.
- Leucopogon cuspidatus R.Br.
- Leucopogon deformis R.Br.
- Leucopogon distans R.Br.
- Leucopogon ericoides (Sm.) R.Br.
- Leucopogon esquamatus R.Br.
- Leucopogon flexifolius R.Br.
- Leucopogon glabellus R.Br.
- Leucopogon gracilis R.Br.
- Leucopogon imbricatus R.Br.
- Leucopogon interruptus R.Br.
- Leucopogon juniperinus R.Br.
- Leucopogon lanceolatus (Sm.) R.Br.
- Leucopogon leptospermoides R.Br.
- Leucopogon margarodes R.Br.
- Leucopogon microphyllus (Cav.) R.Br.
- Leucopogon montanus (R.Br.) J.H.Willis
- Leucopogon multiflorus R.Br.
- Leucopogon muticus R.Br.
- Leucopogon obovatus (Labill.) R.Br.
- Leucopogon pendulus R.Br.
- Leucopogon polystachyus R.Br.
- Leucopogon propinquus R.Br.
- Leucopogon reflexus R.Br.
- Leucopogon revolutus R.Br.
- Leucopogon rubricaulis R.Br.
- Leucopogon ruscifolius R.Br.
- Leucopogon setiger R.Br.
- Leucopogon striatus R.Br.
- Leucopogon tamariscinus R.Br.
- Leucopogon verticillatus R.Br.
- Leucopogon virgatus (Labill.) R.Br.
- Levenhookia pusilla R.Br.
- Libertia paniculata (R.Br.) Spreng.
- Libertia pulchella (R.Br.) Spreng.
- Limonium australe (R.Br.) Kuntze
- Limosella australis R.Br.
- Lindernia alsinoides R.Br.
- Lindernia scapigera R.Br.
- Lindernia subulata R.Br.
- Lindsaea media R.Br.
- Liparis reflexa (R.Br.) Lindl.
- Lipocarpha microcephala (R.Br.) Kunth
- Lissanthe sapida R.Br.
- Lissanthe strigosa (Sm.) R.Br.
- Livistona australis (R.Br.) Mart.
- Livistona humilis R.Br.
- Livistona inermis R.Br.
- Lobelia dioica R.Br.
- Lobelia membranacea R.Br.
- Lobelia quadrangularis R.Br.
- Lobelia simplicicaulis R.Br.
- Lobelia tenuior R.Br.
- Logania campanulata R.Br.
- Logania crassifolia R.Br.
- Logania fasciculata R.Br.
- Logania ovata R.Br.
- Logania pusilla R.Br.
- Logania serpyllifolia R.Br.
- Lomandra banksii (R.Br.) Lauterb.
- Lomandra collina (R.Br.) Ewart
- Lomandra fluviatilis (R.Br.) A.T.Lee
- Lomandra glauca (R.Br.) Ewart
- Lomandra gracilis (R.Br.) A.T.Lee
- Lomandra hastilis (R.Br.) Ewart
- Lomandra hystrix (R.Br.) L.R.Fraser & Vickery
- Lomandra laxa (R.Br.) A.T.Lee
- Lomandra leucocephala (R.Br.) Ewart
- Lomandra montana (R.Br.) L.R.Fraser & Vickery
- Lomandra mucronata (R.Br.) A.T.Lee
- Lomandra multiflora (R.Br.) A.T.Lee
- Lomandra pauciflora (R.Br.) Ewart
- Lomatia fraseri R.Br.
- Lomatia ilicifolia R.Br.
- Lomatia polymorpha R.Br.
- Lomatia silaifolia (Sm.) R.Br.
- Lomatia tinctoria (Labill.) R.Br.
- Lophostemon confertus (R.Br.) Peter G.Wilson & J.T.Waterh.
- Loxocarya cinerea R.Br.
- Loxocarya pubescens (R.Br.) Benth.
- Lycopodiella diffusa (R.Br.) B.Ollg.
- Lycopodiella lateralis (R.Br.) B.Ollg.
- Lycopodium fastigiatum R.Br.
- Lycopus australis R.Br.
- Lyginia barbata R.Br.
- Lygodium microphyllum (Cav.) R.Br.
- Lyperanthus suaveolens R.Br.
- Lysinema ciliatum R.Br.
- Lysinema conspicuum R.Br.
- Lysinema lasianthum R.Br.

== M ==
- Maireana aphylla (R.Br.) Paul G.Wilson
- Maireana brevifolia (R.Br.) Paul G.Wilson
- Marsdenia australis (R.Br.) Druce
- Marsdenia cinerascens R.Br.
- Marsdenia geminata (R.Br.) P.I.Forst.
- Marsdenia rostrata R.Br. (synonym of Leichhardtia rostrata)
- Marsdenia suaveolens R.Br. (synonym of Leichhardtia suaveolens)
- Marsdenia trinervis (R.Br.) P.I.Forst.
- Marsdenia velutina R.Br.
- Marsdenia viridiflora R.Br.
- Marsilea angustifolia R.Br.
- Marsilea hirsuta R.Br.
- Mazus pumilio R.Br.
- Mecopodum striatum (R.Br.) D.L.Jones & M.A.Clem.
- Meeboldina scariosa (R.Br.) B.G.Briggs & L.A.S.Johnson
- Melaleuca calycina R.Br.
- Melaleuca decussata R.Br.
- Melaleuca densa R.Br.
- Melaleuca fulgens R.Br.
- Melaleuca globifera R.Br.
- Melaleuca incana R.Br.
- Melaleuca pulchella R.Br.
- Melaleuca scabra R.Br.
- Melaleuca uncinata R.Br.
- Melichrus urceolatus R.Br.
- Melicytus dentatus (R.Br. ex DC.) Molloy & Mabb.
- Mentha australis R.Br.
- Mentha satureioides R.Br.
- Merremia quinata (R.Br.) Ooststr.
- Mesomelaena stygia (R.Br.) Nees
- Mesomelaena tetragona (R.Br.) Benth.
- Microcorys barbata R.Br.
- Microcorys purpurea R.Br.
- Microcorys virgata R.Br.
- Microlaena stipoides (Labill.) R.Br.
- Microsorum membranifolium (R.Br.) Ching
- Microtis alba R.Br.
- Microtis media R.Br.
- Microtis parviflora R.Br.
- Microtis pulchella R.Br.
- Microtis rara R.Br.
- Mimulus gracilis R.Br.
- Mimulus repens R.Br.
- Mirbelia dilatata R.Br. ex Dryand.
- Mitrasacme alsinoides R.Br.
- Mitrasacme ambigua R.Br.
- Mitrasacme connata R.Br.
- Mitrasacme elata R.Br.
- Mitrasacme laricifolia R.Br.
- Mitrasacme multicaulis R.Br.
- Mitrasacme paludosa R.Br.
- Mitrasacme phascoides R.Br.
- Mitrasacme polymorpha R.Br.
- Mitrasacme prolifera R.Br.
- Mitrasacme pygmaea R.Br.
- Mitrasacme serpyllifolia R.Br.
- Mitrasacme stellata R.Br.
- Mnesithea formosa (R.Br.) de Koning & Sosef
- Mnesithea rottboellioides (R.Br.) de Koning & Sosef
- Monotoca elliptica (Sm.) R.Br.
- Monotoca empetrifolia R.Br.
- Monotoca scoparia (Sm.) R.Br.
- Murdannia graminea (R.Br.) G.Bruckn.
- Myoporum acuminatum R.Br.
- Myoporum insulare R.Br.
- Myoporum montanum R.Br.
- Myoporum oppositifolium R.Br.
- Myoporum parvifolium R.Br.
- Myoporum platycarpum R.Br.
- Myoporum viscosum R.Br.
- Myosotis australis R.Br.
- Myristica insipida R.Br.
- Myrsine variabilis R.Br.

== N ==
- Najas tenuifolia R.Br.
- Nasturtium officinale R.Br.
- Needhamiella pumilio (R.Br.) L.Watson
- Nelsonia campestris R.Br.
- Nemacianthus caudatus (R.Br.) D.L.Jones & M.A.Clem.
- Neolitsea dealbata (R.Br.) Merr.
- Nephrolepis obliterata (R.Br.) J.Sm.
- Neurachne alopecuroides R.Br.
- Notelaea microcarpa R.Br.
- Notelaea ovata R.Br.
- Notelaea punctata R.Br.
- Notodanthonia longifolia (R.Br.) Veldkamp
- Nuytsia floribunda (Labill.) R.Br.
- Nymphoides geminata (R.Br.) Kuntze
- Nyssanthes diffusa R.Br.
- Nyssanthes erecta R.Br.

== O ==
- Olax aphylla R.Br.
- Olax phyllanthi (Labill.) R.Br.
- Olax stricta R.Br.
- Olea paniculata R.Br.
- Oligarrhena micrantha R.Br.
- Oligochaetochilus rufus (R.Br.) Szlach.
- Oligochaetochilus squamatus (R.Br.) Szlach.
- Omphacomeria acerba (R.Br.) A.DC.
- Ophioglossum costatum R.Br.
- Oplismenus aemulus (R.Br.) Roem. & Schult.
- Oreobolus pumilio R.Br.
- Orites acicularis (R.Br.) Roem. & Schult.
- Orites diversifolius R.Br.
- Orites excelsus R.Br.
- Orites revolutus R.Br.
- Orthoceras strictum R.Br.
- Ottelia ovalifolia (R.Br.) Rich.
- Ourisia integrifolia R.Br.
- Oxylobium arborescens R.Br.
- Oxylobium ellipticum (Vent.) R.Br.

== P ==
- Pachynema complanatum R.Br. ex DC.
- Pandanus pedunculatus R.Br.
- Pandanus spiralis R.Br.
- Panicum decompositum R.Br.
- Panicum effusum R.Br.
- Panicum pygmaeum R.Br.
- Paracaleana minor (R.Br.) Blaxell
- Parahebe formosa (R.Br.) Heads
- Parahebe perfoliata (R.Br.) B.G.Briggs & Ehrend.
- Parsonsia lanceolata R.Br.
- Parsonsia straminea (R.Br.) F.Muell.
- Parsonsia velutina R.Br.
- Paspalidium gracile (R.Br.) Hughes
- Patersonia glabrata R.Br.
- Patersonia lanata R.Br.
- Patersonia longifolia R.Br.
- Patersonia occidentalis R.Br.
- Patersonia sericea R.Br.
- Pellaea falcata (R.Br.) Fee
- Pellaea paradoxa (R.Br.) Hook.
- Pennisetum glaucum (L.) R.Br.
- Pennisetum villosum R.Br. ex Fresen.
- Pentachondra involucrata R.Br.
- Pentachondra pumila (J.R.Forst. & G.Forst.) R.Br.
- Perotis rara R.Br.
- Persicaria attenuata (R.Br.) Sojak
- Persicaria decipiens (R.Br.) K.L.Wilson
- Persicaria elatior (R.Br.) Sojak
- Persicaria prostrata (R.Br.) Sojak
- Persicaria strigosa (R.Br.) H.Gross
- Persicaria subsessilis (R.Br.) K.L.Wilson
- Persoonia attenuata R.Br.
- Persoonia cornifolia A.Cunn. ex R.Br.
- Persoonia curvifolia R.Br.
- Persoonia daphnoides A.Cunn. ex R.Br.
- Persoonia elliptica R.Br.
- Persoonia falcata R.Br.
- Persoonia fastigiata R.Br.
- Persoonia flexifolia R.Br.
- Persoonia graminea R.Br.
- Persoonia longifolia R.Br.
- Persoonia marginata A.Cunn. ex R.Br.
- Persoonia media R.Br.
- Persoonia microcarpa R.Br.
- Persoonia microphylla R.Br.
- Persoonia mollis R.Br.
- Persoonia nutans R.Br.
- Persoonia oblongata R.Br.
- Persoonia pinifolia R.Br.
- Persoonia prostrata R.Br.
- Persoonia rigida R.Br.
- Persoonia saccata R.Br.
- Persoonia scabra R.Br.
- Persoonia sericea A.Cunn. ex R.Br.
- Persoonia spathulata R.Br.
- Persoonia striata R.Br.
- Persoonia tenuifolia R.Br.
- Persoonia teretifolia R.Br.
- Persoonia virgata R.Br.
- Petalochilus alatus (R.Br.) D.L.Jones & M.A.Clem.
- Petalostylis labicheoides R.Br.
- Petrophile acicularis R.Br.
- Petrophile anceps R.Br.
- Petrophile biloba R.Br.
- Petrophile canescens A.Cunn. ex R.Br.
- Petrophile crispata R.Br.
- Petrophile divaricata R.Br.
- Petrophile diversifolia R.Br.
- Petrophile ericifolia R.Br.
- Petrophile fastigiata R.Br.
- Petrophile linearis R.Br.
- Petrophile longifolia R.Br.
- Petrophile macrostachya R.Br.
- Petrophile media R.Br.
- Petrophile pedunculata R.Br.
- Petrophile phylicoides R.Br.
- Petrophile pulchella (Schrad. & J.C.Wendl.) R.Br.
- Petrophile rigida R.Br.
- Petrophile serruriae R.Br.
- Petrophile squamata R.Br.
- Petrophile striata R.Br.
- Petrophile teretifolia R.Br.
- Philydrella pygmaea (R.Br.) Caruel
- Phlebocarya ciliata R.Br.
- Phyllangium paradoxum (R.Br.) Dunlop
- Pimelea angustifolia R.Br.
- Pimelea argentea R.Br.
- Pimelea cinerea R.Br.
- Pimelea glauca R.Br.
- Pimelea hispida R.Br.
- Pimelea humilis R.Br.
- Pimelea lanata R.Br.
- Pimelea octophylla R.Br.
- Pimelea pauciflora R.Br.
- Pimelea rosea R.Br.
- Pimelea sericea R.Br.
- Pimelea spicata R.Br.
- Pimelea sylvestris R.Br.
- Pisonia grandis R.Br.
- Pityrodia salviifolia R.Br.
- Planchonella australis (R.Br.) Pierre
- Planchonella obovata (R.Br.) Pierre
- Plantago debilis R.Br.
- Plantago hispida R.Br.
- Plantago varia R.Br.
- Platylobium triangulare R.Br.
- Platyzoma microphyllum R.Br.
- Plectranthus congestus R.Br.
- Plectranthus scutellarioides (L.) R.Br.
- Pleurosorus rutifolius (R.Br.) Fee
- Plinthanthesis paradoxa (R.Br.) S.T.Blake
- Poa affinis R.Br.
- Poa saxicola R.Br.
- Podocarpus elatus R.Br. ex Endl.
- Podocarpus spinulosus (Sm.) R.Br. ex Mirb.
- Pollia crispata (R.Br.) Benth.
- Pollia macrophylla (R.Br.) Benth.
- Polygonum lanigerum R.Br.
- Polygonum plebeium R.Br.
- Polymeria ambigua R.Br.
- Polymeria calycina R.Br.
- Polymeria pusilla R.Br.
- Polypogon tenellus R.Br.
- Polystichum proliferum (R.Br.) C.Presl
- Potamophila parviflora R.Br.
- Prasophyllum australe R.Br.
- Prasophyllum elatum R.Br.
- Prasophyllum fimbriatum R.Br.
- Prasophyllum flavum R.Br.
- Prasophyllum fuscum R.Br.
- Prasophyllum macrostachyum R.Br.
- Prasophyllum nigricans R.Br.
- Prasophyllum patens R.Br.
- Prasophyllum rufum R.Br.
- Pratia concolor (R.Br.) Druce
- Pratia irrigua (R.Br.) Benth.
- Pratia pedunculata (R.Br.) Benth.
- Pratia purpurascens (R.Br.) E.Wimm.
- Premna acuminata R.Br.
- Prionotes cerinthoides (Labill.) R.Br.
- Proiphys alba (R.Br.) Mabb.
- Prostanthera caerulea R.Br.
- Prostanthera denticulata R.Br.
- Prostanthera incisa R.Br.
- Prostanthera linearis R.Br.
- Prostanthera marifolia R.Br.
- Prostanthera ovalifolia R.Br.
- Prostanthera prunelloides R.Br.
- Prostanthera rhombea R.Br.
- Prostanthera rotundifolia R.Br.
- Prostanthera saxicola R.Br.
- Prostanthera scutellarioides (R.Br.) Briq.
- Prostanthera serpyllifolia (R.Br.) Briq.
- Prostanthera violacea R.Br.
- Pseuderanthemum variabile (R.Br.) Radlk.
- Pseudopogonatherum irritans (R.Br.) A.Camus
- Pseudoraphis abortiva (R.Br.) Pilg.
- Pseudoraphis paradoxa (R.Br.) Pilg.
- Pseudoraphis spinescens (R.Br.) Vickery
- Psydrax attenuata (R.Br. ex Benth.) S.T.Reynolds & R.J.F.Hend.
- Psydrax attenuata (R.Br. ex Benth.) S.T.Reynolds & R.J.F.Hend. f. myrmecophila
- Pteris tremula R.Br.
- Pteris umbrosa R.Br.
- Pterostylis acuminata R.Br.
- Pterostylis concinna R.Br.
- Pterostylis cucullata R.Br.
- Pterostylis curta R.Br.
- Pterostylis dubia R.Br.
- Pterostylis gibbosa R.Br.
- Pterostylis grandiflora R.Br.
- Pterostylis longifolia R.Br.
- Pterostylis mutica R.Br.
- Pterostylis nana R.Br.
- Pterostylis nutans R.Br.
- Pterostylis ophioglossa R.Br.
- Pterostylis parviflora R.Br.
- Pterostylis pedunculata R.Br.
- Pterostylis reflexa R.Br.
- Pterostylis revoluta R.Br.
- Ptilanthelium deustum (R.Br.) Kuk.
- Ptilothrix deusta (R.Br.) K.L.Wilson
- Ptilotus conicus R.Br.
- Ptilotus corymbosus R.Br.
- Ptilotus distans (R.Br.) Poir.
- Ptilotus fusiformis (R.Br.) Poir.
- Ptilotus incanus (R.Br.) Poir.
- Ptilotus latifolius R.Br.
- Ptilotus macrocephalus (R.Br.) Poir.
- Ptilotus spathulatus (R.Br.) Poir.
- Ptilotus spathulatus (R.Br.) Poir. f. spathulatus
- Ptychosperma elegans (R.Br.) Blume
- Pultenaea acerosa R.Br. ex Benth.
- Pultenaea scabra R.Br.
- Pultenaea tenuifolia R.Br. & Sims
- Pultenaea vestita R.Br.
- Pultenaea viscosa R.Br. ex Benth.
- Pyrorchis nigricans (R.Br.) D.L.Jones & M.A.Clem.
- Pyrrosia confluens (R.Br.) Ching
- Pyrrosia rupestris (R.Br.) Ching

== R ==
- Ranunculus inundatus R.Br. ex DC.
- Ranunculus pumilio R.Br. ex DC.
- Ranunculus sessiliflorus R.Br. ex DC.
- Rapanea urceolata (R.Br.) Mez
- Rhagodia crassifolia R.Br.
- Rhagodia parabolica R.Br.
- Rhagodia spinescens R.Br.
- Rhynchospora longisetis R.Br.
- Richea dracophylla R.Br.
- Richea sprengelioides (R.Br.) F.Muell.
- Rimacola elliptica (R.Br.) Rupp
- Ripogonum album R.Br.
- Rostellularia adscendens (R.Br.) R.M.Barker
- Rumex bidens R.Br.
- Rytidosperma pauciflorum (R.Br.) Connor & Edgar

== S ==
- Sacciolepis myosuroides (R.Br.) A.Camus
- Salvia plebeia R.Br.
- Samolus junceus R.Br.
- Santalum acuminatum (R.Br.) A.DC.
- Santalum lanceolatum R.Br.
- Santalum obtusifolium R.Br.
- Santalum spicatum (R.Br.) A.DC.
- Sarcochilus falcatus R.Br.
- Sarcostemma australe R.Br.
- Sarcostemma viminale (L.) R.Br.
- Sarga plumosum (R.Br.) Spangler
- Scaevola aemula R.Br.
- Scaevola angulata R.Br.
- Scaevola depauperata R.Br.
- Scaevola humilis R.Br.
- Scaevola linearis R.Br.
- Scaevola nitida R.Br.
- Scaevola ovalifolia R.Br.
- Scaevola paludosa R.Br.
- Scaevola revoluta R.Br.
- Scaevola spinescens R.Br.
- Scaevola striata R.Br.
- Schelhammera multiflora R.Br.
- Schelhammera undulata R.Br.
- Schizachyrium fragile (R.Br.) A.Camus
- Schizaea rupestris R.Br.
- Schoenus acuminatus R.Br.
- Schoenus brevifolius R.Br.
- Schoenus brevisetis (R.Br.) Roem. & Schult.
- Schoenus curvifolius (R.Br.) Poir. ex Roem. & Schult.
- Schoenus ericetorum R.Br.
- Schoenus falcatus R.Br.
- Schoenus imberbis R.Br.
- Schoenus melanostachys R.Br.
- Schoenus punctatus R.Br.
- Schoenus sparteus R.Br.
- Schoenus villosus R.Br.
- Scirpus plumosus R.Br.
- Scleranthus diander R.Br.
- Scleranthus pungens R.Br.
- Scleria caricina (R.Br.) Benth.
- Scleria laxa R.Br.
- Scleria pygmaea R.Br.
- Scleria rugosa R.Br.
- Sclerolaena divaricata (R.Br.) Sm.
- Sclerolaena uniflora R.Br.
- Sclerostegia arbuscula (R.Br.) Paul G.Wilson
- Scutellaria humilis R.Br.
- Scutellaria mollis R.Br.
- Sebaea ovata (Labill.) R.Br.
- Secamone elliptica R.Br.
- Setaria rara (R.Br.) R.D.Webster
- Smilax australis R.Br.
- Solanum campanulatum R.Br.
- Solanum cinereum R.Br.
- Solanum discolor R.Br.
- Solanum echinatum R.Br.
- Solanum ellipticum R.Br.
- Solanum furfuraceum R.Br.
- Solanum hystrix R.Br.
- Solanum parvifolium R.Br.
- Solanum pungetium R.Br.
- Solanum tetrandrum R.Br.
- Soliva stolonifera (Brot.) R.Br. ex G.Don
- Sorghum plumosum (R.Br.) P.Beauv.
- Sphaerolobium medium R.Br.
- Sphenotoma capitata (R.Br.) Lindl.
- Sphenotoma gracilis (R.Br.) Sweet
- Sphenotoma squarrosa (R.Br.) G.Don
- Spinifex longifolius R.Br.
- Spinifex sericeus R.Br.
- Sporadanthus gracilis (R.Br.) B.G.Briggs & L.A.S.Johnson
- Sporadanthus strictus (R.Br.) B.G.Briggs & L.A.S.Johnson
- Sporobolus elongatus R.Br.
- Sporobolus indicus (L.) R.Br.
- Sporobolus pulchellus R.Br.
- Sprengelia montana R.Br.
- Sprengelia sprengelioides (R.Br.) Druce
- Stemodia pubescens (R.Br.) W.R.Barker
- Stemona lucida (R.Br.) Duyfjes
- Stenocarpus cunninghamii R.Br.
- Stenocarpus salignus R.Br.
- Stenopetalum lineare R.Br. ex DC.
- Sterculia quadrifida R.Br.
- Sticherus flabellatus (R.Br.) H.St.John
- Sticherus tener (R.Br.) Ching
- Stirlingia anethifolia (R.Br.) Endl.
- Stirlingia latifolia (R.Br.) Steud.
- Stirlingia tenuifolia (R.Br.) Steud.
- Striga curviflora (R.Br.) Benth.
- Striga parviflora (R.Br.) Benth.
- Strychnos lucida R.Br.
- Stylidium adnatum R.Br.
- Stylidium alsinoides R.Br.
- Stylidium amoenum R.Br.
- Stylidium articulatum R.Br.
- Stylidium assimile R.Br.
- Stylidium breviscapum R.Br.
- Stylidium caespitosum R.Br.
- Stylidium calcaratum R.Br.
- Stylidium capillare R.Br.
- Stylidium corymbosum R.Br.
- Stylidium crassifolium R.Br.
- Stylidium despectum R.Br.
- Stylidium diversifolium R.Br.
- Stylidium eriorhizum R.Br.
- Stylidium falcatum R.Br.
- Stylidium fasciculatum R.Br.
- Stylidium floribundum R.Br.
- Stylidium guttatum R.Br.
- Stylidium hirsutum R.Br.
- Stylidium inundatum R.Br.
- Stylidium junceum R.Br.
- Stylidium luteum R.Br.
- Stylidium pedunculatum R.Br.
- Stylidium piliferum R.Br.
- Stylidium pygmaeum R.Br.
- Stylidium repens R.Br.
- Stylidium rotundifolium R.Br.
- Stylidium scandens R.Br.
- Stylidium spathulatum R.Br.
- Stylidium spinulosum R.Br.
- Stylidium violaceum R.Br.
- Stypandra glauca R.Br.
- Styphelia adscendens R.Br.
- Styphelia laeta R.Br.
- Styphelia longifolia R.Br.
- Suaeda australis (R.Br.) Moq.
- Sutherlandia frutescens (L.) R.Br. ex W.T.Aiton
- Swainsona galegifolia (Andrews) R.Br.
- Swainsona laxa R.Br.
- Symphionema montanum R.Br.
- Symphionema paludosum R.Br.
- Synaphea favosa R.Br.
- Synaphea petiolaris R.Br.
- Synaphea polymorpha R.Br.

== T ==
- Tabernaemontana orientalis R.Br.
- Tasmannia insipida R.Br. ex DC.
- Telopea speciosissima (Sm.) R.Br.
- Telopea truncata (Labill.) R.Br.
- Templetonia retusa (Vent.) R.Br.
- Tephrosia astragaloides R.Br. ex Benth.
- Tephrosia juncea R.Br. ex Benth.
- Tephrosia oblongata R.Br. ex Benth.
- Tephrosia porrecta R.Br. ex Benth.
- Tephrosia reticulata R.Br. ex Benth.
- Tetrameles nudiflora R.Br.
- Tetrarrhena acuminata R.Br.
- Tetrarrhena distichophylla (Labill.) R.Br.
- Tetrarrhena juncea R.Br.
- Tetrarrhena laevis R.Br.
- Teucrium argutum R.Br.
- Teucrium corymbosum R.Br.
- Teucrium racemosum R.Br.
- Thecanthes punicea (R.Br.) Wikstr.
- Thelionema caespitosum (R.Br.) R.J.F.Hend.
- Thelionema umbellatum (R.Br.) R.J.F.Hend.
- Thelymitra angustifolia R.Br.
- Thelymitra canaliculata R.Br.
- Thelymitra carnea R.Br.
- Thelymitra fuscolutea R.Br.
- Thelymitra media R.Br.
- Thelymitra nuda R.Br.
- Thelymitra pauciflora R.Br.
- Thelymitra tigrina R.Br.
- Thelymitra venosa R.Br.
- Thesium australe R.Br.
- Threlkeldia diffusa R.Br.
- Thuarea involuta (G.Forst.) R.Br. ex Sm.
- Thysanotus banksii R.Br.
- Thysanotus baueri R.Br.
- Thysanotus dichotomus (Labill.) R.Br.
- Thysanotus gracilis R.Br.
- Thysanotus isantherus R.Br.
- Thysanotus multiflorus R.Br.
- Thysanotus patersonii R.Br.
- Thysanotus pauciflorus R.Br.
- Thysanotus sparteus R.Br.
- Thysanotus triandrus (Labill.) R.Br.
- Thysanotus tuberosus R.Br.
- Tmesipteris truncata (R.Br.) Desv.
- Tremandra stelligera R.Br.
- Tremulina tremula (R.Br.) B.G.Briggs & L.A.S.Johnson
- Tribulopis angustifolia R.Br.
- Tribulopis pentandra R.Br.
- Tribulopis solandri R.Br.
- Tribulus hystrix R.Br.
- Tribulus occidentalis R.Br.
- Trichodesma zeylanicum R.Br.
- Tricoryne anceps R.Br.
- Tricoryne elatior R.Br.
- Tricoryne simplex R.Br.
- Tricoryne tenella R.Br.
- Triglochin mucronatum R.Br.
- Triglochin procerum R.Br.
- Triodia irritans R.Br.
- Triodia microstachya R.Br.
- Triodia procera R.Br.
- Triodia pungens R.Br.
- Triraphis mollis R.Br.
- Tristania neriifolia (Sims) R.Br.
- Triumfetta denticulata R.Br. ex Benth.
- Trochocarpa laurina (Rudge) R.Br.
- Trochocarpa thymifolia (R.Br.) Spreng.
- Tropilis aemula (R.Br.) Raf.
- Tylophora barbata R.Br. (synonym of Vincetoxicum barbatum)
- Tylophora cinerascens (R.Br.) P.I.Forst.
- Tylophora flexuosa R.Br.
- Tylophora grandiflora R.Br.
- Tylophora paniculata R.Br.

== U ==
- Uncinia compacta R.Br.
- Uncinia riparia R.Br.
- Uncinia tenella R.Br.
- Urochloa foliosa (R.Br.) R.D.Webster
- Urochloa holosericea (R.Br.) R.D.Webster
- Urochloa polyphylla (R.Br.) R.D.Webster
- Utricularia albiflora R.Br.
- Utricularia australis R.Br.
- Utricularia barbata R.Br.
- Utricularia baueri R.Br.
- Utricularia biloba R.Br.
- Utricularia chrysantha R.Br.
- Utricularia cyanea R.Br.
- Utricularia exoleta R.Br.
- Utricularia lateriflora R.Br.
- Utricularia limosa R.Br.
- Utricularia menziesii R.Br.
- Utricularia simplex R.Br.
- Utricularia tenella R.Br.
- Utricularia violacea R.Br.
- Utricularia volubilis R.Br.

== V ==
- Vallisneria nana R.Br.
- Velleia arguta R.Br.
- Velleia lyrata R.Br.
- Velleia paradoxa R.Br.
- Velleia perfoliata R.Br.
- Velleia pubescens R.Br.
- Velleia spathulata R.Br.
- Veronica arguta R.Br.
- Veronica calycina R.Br.
- Veronica distans R.Br.
- Veronica gracilis R.Br.
- Veronica plebeia R.Br.
- Vetiveria elongata (R.Br.) Stapf ex C.E.Hubb.
- Villarsia parnassiifolia (Labill.) R.Br.
- Villarsia reniformis R.Br.
- Vitex acuminata R.Br.
- Vitex glabrata R.Br.

== W ==
- Wahlenbergia quadrifida (R.Br.) A.DC.
- Wahlenbergia saxicola (R.Br.) A.DC.
- Wahlenbergia stricta (R.Br.) Sweet
- Westringia angustifolia R.Br.
- Westringia dampieri R.Br.
- Westringia glabra R.Br.
- Westringia longifolia R.Br.
- Westringia rigida R.Br.
- Westringia rubiifolia R.Br.
- Whiteochloa airoides (R.Br.) Lazarides
- Wilsonia humilis R.Br.
- Wrightia pubescens R.Br.
- Wrightia saligna (R.Br.) F.Muell. ex Benth.
- Wurmbea biglandulosa (R.Br.) T.D.Macfarl.
- Wurmbea dioica (R.Br.) F.Muell.
- Wurmbea uniflora (R.Br.) T.D.Macfarl.

== X ==
- Xanthorrhoea arborea R.Br.
- Xanthorrhoea australis R.Br.
- Xanthorrhoea bracteata R.Br.
- Xanthorrhoea media R.Br.
- Xanthorrhoea minor R.Br.
- Xanthorrhoea pumilio R.Br.
- Xerochloa barbata R.Br.
- Xerochloa imberbis R.Br.
- Xylomelum occidentale R.Br.
- Xyris complanata R.Br.
- Xyris flexifolia R.Br.
- Xyris gracilis R.Br.
- Xyris juncea R.Br.
- Xyris lacera R.Br.
- Xyris lanata R.Br.

== Y ==
- Yakirra pauciflora (R.Br.) Lazarides & R.D.Webster

== Z ==
- Zieria furfuracea R.Br. ex Benth.
- Zieria involucrata R.Br. ex Benth.
- Zygochloa paradoxa (R.Br.) S.T.Blake

== See also ==
- Brown's taxonomic arrangement of Banksia
