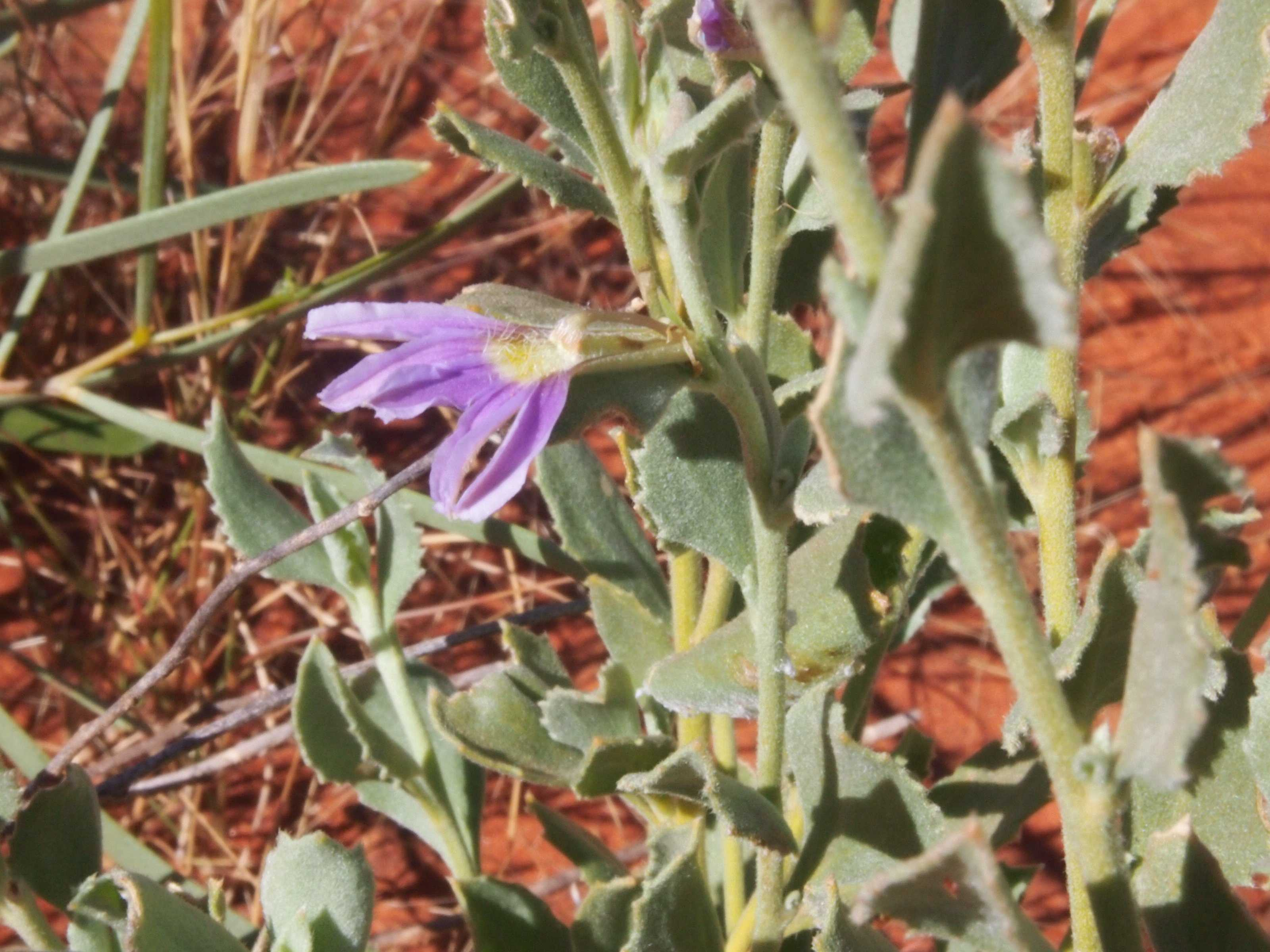

Scientific classification
- Kingdom: Plantae
- Clade: Embryophytes
- Clade: Tracheophytes
- Clade: Angiosperms
- Clade: Eudicots
- Clade: Asterids
- Order: Asterales
- Family: Goodeniaceae
- Genus: Scaevola
- Species: S. ovalifolia

Binomial name
- Scaevola ovalifolia R.Br.
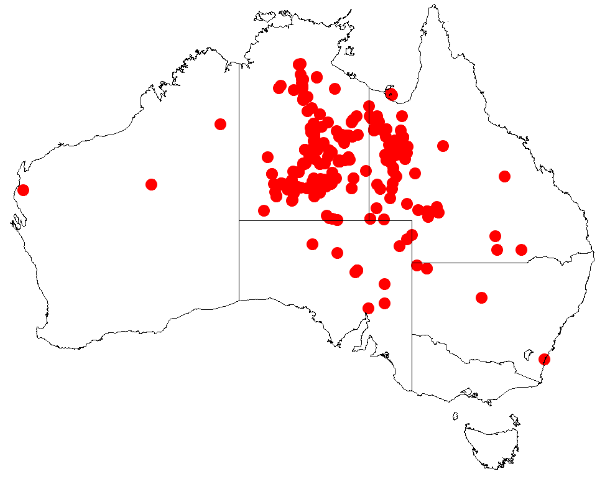
- Occurrence data from AVH

Synonyms
- Lobelia ovalifolia (R.Br.) Kuntze nom. illeg.; Merkusia ovalifolia (R.Br.) de Vriese; Merkusia ovalifolia var. cinerascens (R.Br.) de Vriese; Merkusia ovalifolia (R.Br.) de Vriese var. ovalifolia; Scaevola densevestita Domin; Scaevola ovalifolia var. cinerascens R.Br.; Scaevola ovalifolia R.Br. var. ovalifolia

= Scaevola ovalifolia =

Species of shrub

Scaevola ovalifolia, commonly known as bushy fanflower, is a species of flowering plant in the family Goodeniaceae and is endemic to northern Australia. It is a subshrub with sessile, egg-shaped to narrowly elliptic, hairy, sometimes toothed leaves, spikes of blue or mauve flowers, and oval fruit.

== Description ==
Scaevola ovalifolia is a subshrub that typically grows up to 50 cm (20 in) high. Its leaves are sessile, egg-shaped with the narrower end towards the base, or narrowly elliptic, 8–55 mm (0.31–2.17 in) long, 4–21 mm (0.16–0.83 in) wide and hairy, sometimes with toothed edges. The flowers are arranged in spikes up to 20 mm (0.79 in) long with leaf-like bracts and linear bracteoles 4–15 mm (0.16–0.59 in) long. The petals are blue or mauve, 14–24 mm (0.55–0.94 in) long with simple hairs outside and densely bearded inside, and the ovary has two locules. Flowering occurs in most months and the fruit is oval, 4–5 mm (0.16–0.20 in) long and hairy.

== Taxonomy ==
Scaevola ovalifolia was first formally described in 1810 by Robert Brown in his Prodromus Florae Novae Hollandiae. The specific epithet (ovalifolia) means 'oval-leaved'.

== Distribution and habitat ==
This species of Scaevola grows mostly on sand, sometimes on rocky hill slopes in the Northern Territory and in south-western Queensland.

== Conservation status ==
Scaevola ovalifolia is listed as 'least concern under the Queensland Government Nature Conservation Act 1992 and the Northern Territory Government Territory Parks and Wildlife Conservation Act.
