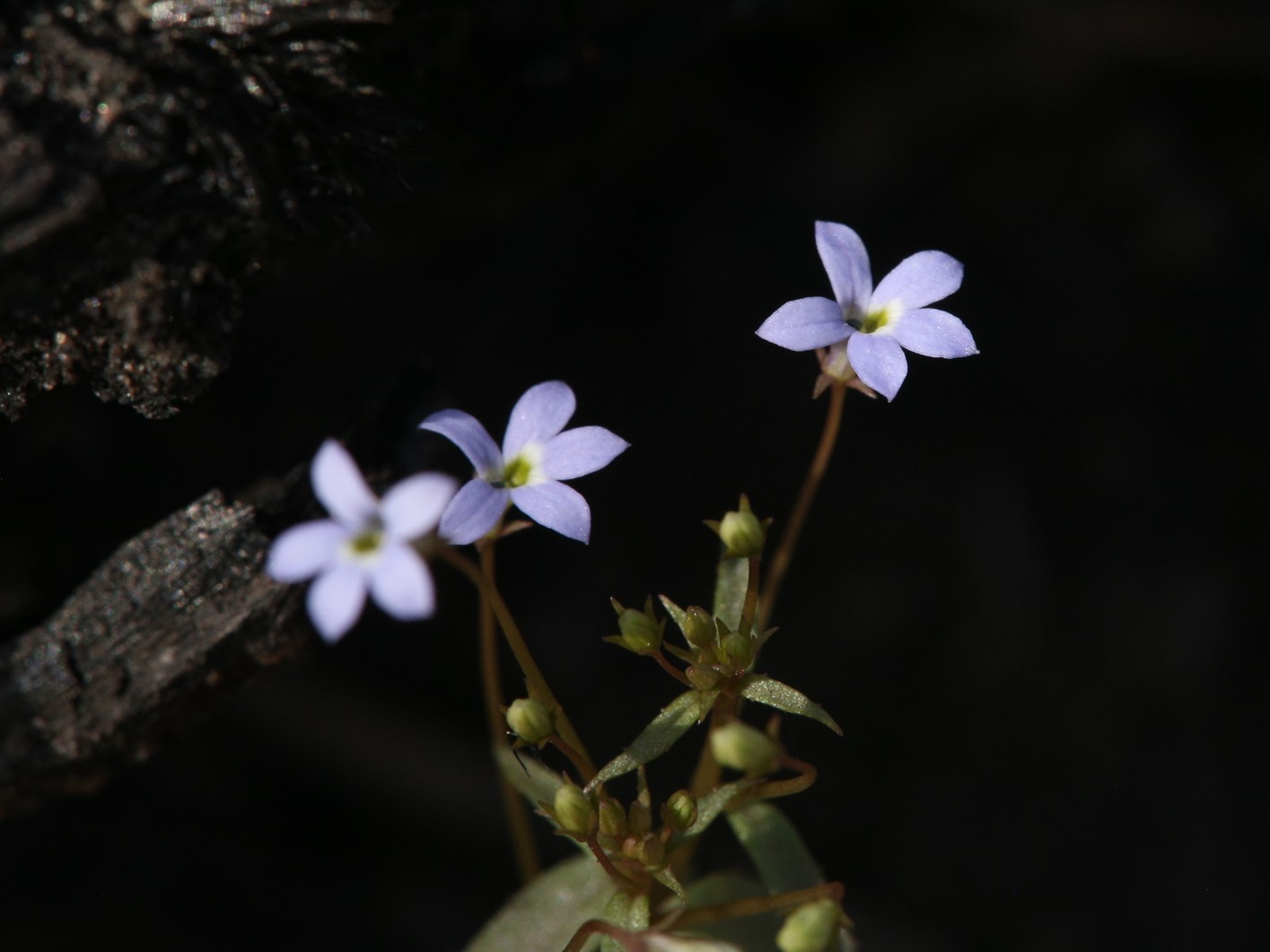

Scientific classification
- Kingdom: Plantae
- Clade: Tracheophytes
- Clade: Angiosperms
- Clade: Eudicots
- Clade: Asterids
- Order: Asterales
- Family: Campanulaceae
- Genus: Lobelia
- Species: L. dioica

Binomial name
- Lobelia dioica R.Br.

= Lobelia dioica =

Species of flowering plant

Lobelia dioica is a small herbaceous plant in the family Campanulaceae native to Western Australia.

The erect to ascending and dioecious herb typically grows to a height of 0.07 to 0.3 metres (0 to 1 ft). It blooms between May and September producing white-blue-purple flowers.

The herb is found in damp areas along the edges of creeks and watercourses and in swamps scattered through the Kimberley region of Western Australia where it grows in sandy-clay soils.
