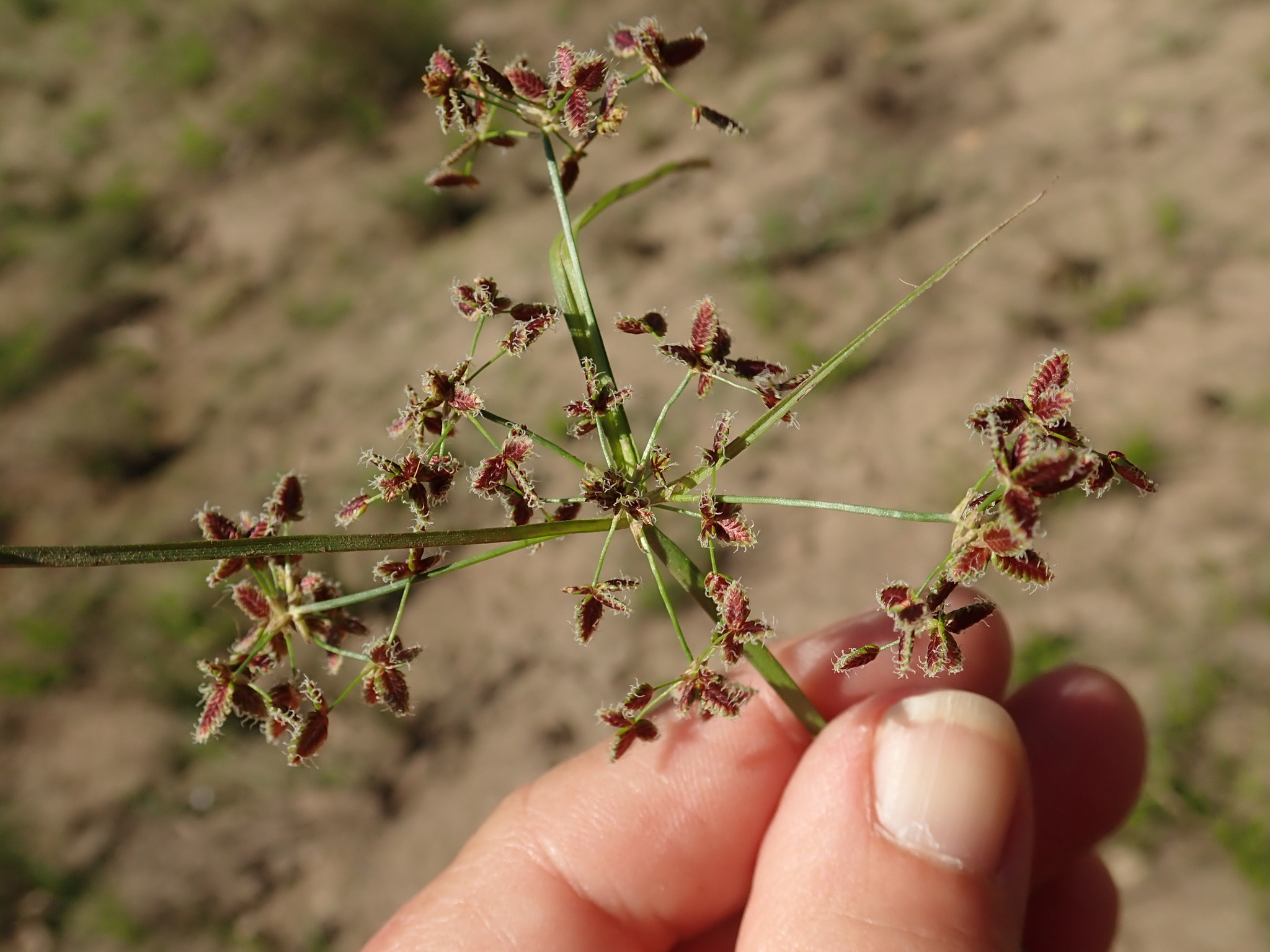

Scientific classification
- Kingdom: Plantae
- Clade: Tracheophytes
- Clade: Angiosperms
- Clade: Monocots
- Clade: Commelinids
- Order: Poales
- Family: Cyperaceae
- Genus: Cyperus
- Species: C. concinnus

Binomial name
- Cyperus concinnus R.Br.

= Cyperus concinnus =

Species of plant endemic to Australia

Cyperus concinnus (common name - trim flat-sedge) is a sedge of the family Cyperaceae that is native to Australia, and found in New South Wales, Queensland, the Northern Territory, South Australia, Victoria and Western Australia.

== Description ==
The tufted perennial rhizomatous sedge typically grows to a height of 0.2 to 0.8 metres (0.7 to 2.6 ft) and produces brown flowers. It has culms with a triangular cross section. The culms are slightly swollen at the base and rough and scabrous above with a length of 15 to 65 cm (5.9 to 25.6 in) and a diameter of 1 to 3 m (3 ft 3 in to 9 ft 10 in). The leaves have a prominent transverse septa and are about the same length of the culms and have a width of 1 to 2 mm (0.039 to 0.079 in). The inflorescences have three to five primary branches with a length up to 4 cm (1.6 in) forming clusters that have a diameter of about 10 mm (0.39 in). There are one to six flattened spikelets per cluster with a length of 4 to 10 mm (0.16 to 0.39 in) and a width of 1 to 3 mm (0.039 to 0.118 in).

== Distribution ==
It is found in all the mainland states and territories of Australia except for South Australia. In Western Australia it is found in swamps and around creeks and pools the Mid West, Pilbara and Goldfields–Esperance regions where it grows in sandy-clay soils.

== Taxonomy ==
It was first described in 1810 by Robert Brown as a part of the work Prodromus Florae Novae Hollandiae et Insulae Van Diemen.

== See also ==
- List of Cyperus species
