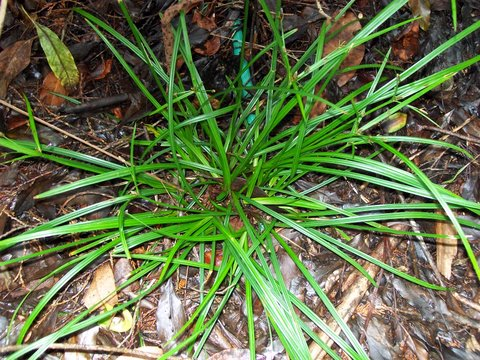
- Cyperus tetraphyllus at Eastwood, Australia

Scientific classification
- Kingdom: Plantae
- Clade: Embryophytes
- Clade: Tracheophytes
- Clade: Spermatophytes
- Clade: Angiosperms
- Clade: Monocots
- Clade: Commelinids
- Order: Poales
- Family: Cyperaceae
- Genus: Cyperus
- Species: C. tetraphyllus

Binomial name
- Cyperus tetraphyllus R.Br.

= Cyperus tetraphyllus =

Species of plant

Cyperus tetraphyllus is a sedge endemic to Australia. This grass-like plant is closely related to the papyrus. It grows to 50 cm high. The habitat is eastern Australia in high rainfall areas. It is found in and near rainforest from Kiama north to Queensland.

Flowering occurs in spring and summer. The species name tetraphyllus literally means "four leaves", however, this plant is not clearly four leaved, and the meaning is obscure.
