= Cyperus breviculmis =

Scientific classification
- Kingdom: Plantae
- Clade: Tracheophytes
- Clade: Angiosperms
- Clade: Monocots
- Clade: Commelinids
- Order: Poales
- Family: Cyperaceae
- Genus: Cyperus
- Species: C. breviculmis

Binomial name
- Cyperus breviculmis R.Br.

Species of plant endemic to Australia

Cyperus breviculmis is a sedge of the family Cyperaceae that is native to parts of northern Australia.

The annual sedge typically grows to a height of 5 to 20 centimetres (2.0 to 7.9 in) with a caespitose habit. The plant blooms between April and August producing green-brown flowers.

In Western Australia it is found around swamps in the Kimberley region where it grows in red-brown permanently damp clay soils. It is also found in the Northern Territory and Queensland.

== See also ==
- List of Cyperus species
