= Cyperus sexflorus =

Scientific classification
- Kingdom: Plantae
- Clade: Tracheophytes
- Clade: Angiosperms
- Clade: Monocots
- Clade: Commelinids
- Order: Poales
- Family: Cyperaceae
- Genus: Cyperus
- Species: C. sexflorus

Binomial name
- Cyperus sexflorus R.Br.

Species of plant

Cyperus sexflorus is a sedge of the family Cyperaceae that is native to Australia.

The rhizomatous, perennial, herbaceous, grass-like sedge typically grows to a height of 0.3 to 0.75 metres (1.0 to 2.5 ft). It blooms between January and July, producing brown flowers.

In Western Australia it is found amongst sandstone rocks in the Kimberley region where it grows in sandy soils. It is also found across the top end of the Northern Territory.

== See also ==
- List of Cyperus species
