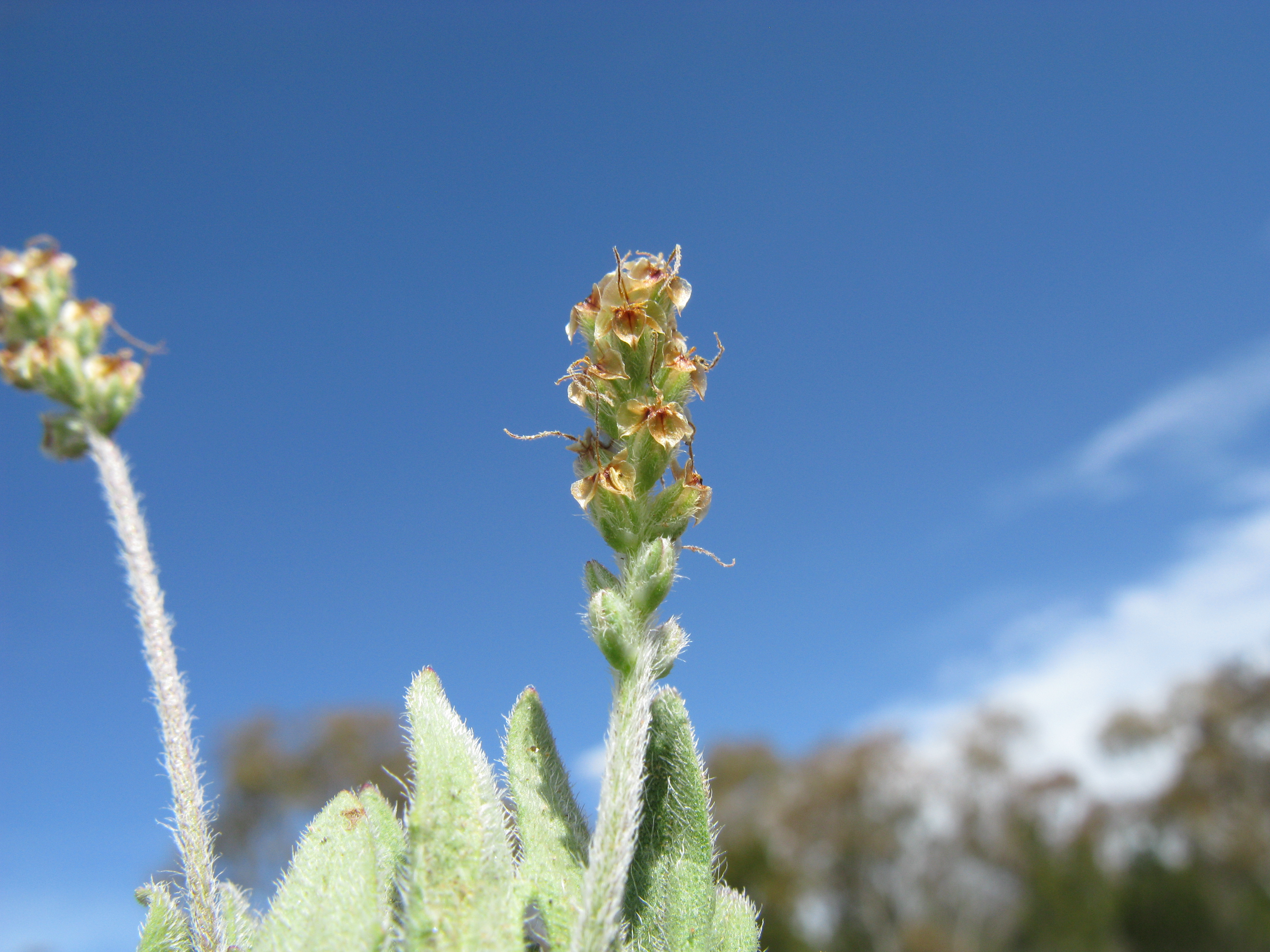

Scientific classification
- Kingdom: Plantae
- Clade: Tracheophytes
- Clade: Angiosperms
- Clade: Eudicots
- Clade: Asterids
- Order: Lamiales
- Family: Plantaginaceae
- Genus: Plantago
- Species: P. hispida

Binomial name
- Plantago hispida R.Br.

Synonyms
- Plantago tildeniae Pilg.

= Plantago hispida =

Species of plant

Plantago hispida, the coastal plaintain or hairy plaintain, is a low, dense, tufted herb mostly seen in crevices of rock exposures or other sites with shallow soils. Often found near the sea, but may also be seen in inland sites with low rainfall. This is one of the many plants first published by Robert Brown with the type known as "(D.M.) v.v." appearing in his Prodromus Florae Novae Hollandiae et Insulae Van Diemen in 1810. The specific epithet hispida is derived from Latin, meaning "rough", however this is misleading as it doesn't appear relevant to this plant.
