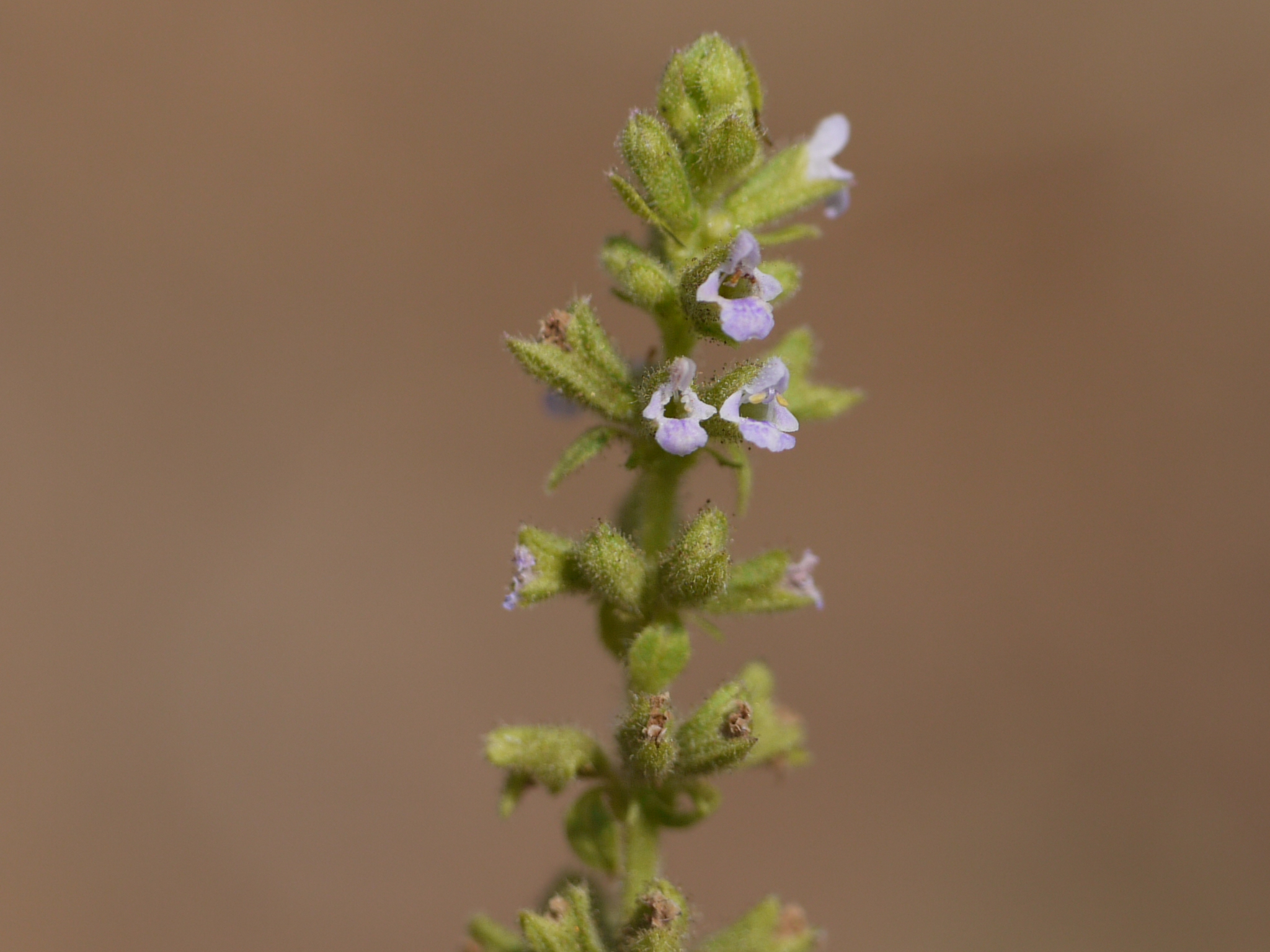

Scientific classification
- Kingdom: Plantae
- Clade: Tracheophytes
- Clade: Angiosperms
- Clade: Eudicots
- Clade: Asterids
- Order: Lamiales
- Family: Lamiaceae
- Genus: Salvia
- Species: S. plebeia

Binomial name
- Salvia plebeia R.Br.

= Salvia plebeia =

Species of herb

Salvia plebeia is an annual or biennial herb that is native to a wide region of Asia. It grows on hillsides, streamsides, and wet fields from sea level to 2,800 m (9,200 ft). S. plebeia grows on erect stems to a height of 15 to 90 cm (5.9 to 35.4 in) tall, with elliptic-ovate to elliptic-lanceolate leaves. Inflorescences are 6-flowered verticillasters in racemes or panicles, with a distinctly small corolla (4.5 mm (0.18 in)) that comes in a wide variety of colors: reddish, purplish, purple, blue-purple, to blue, and rarely white.
