= Goodenia coronopifolia =

Scientific classification
- Kingdom: Plantae
- Clade: Tracheophytes
- Clade: Angiosperms
- Clade: Eudicots
- Clade: Asterids
- Order: Asterales
- Family: Goodeniaceae
- Genus: Goodenia
- Species: G. coronopifolia

Binomial name
- Goodenia coronopifolia R.Br.

Species of plant

Goodenia coronopifolia is a species of flowering plant in the family Goodeniaceae and is endemic to north-western Australia. It is a herb with mostly linear leaves, those at the base of the plant divided with narrow segments, racemes of yellow flowers with brownish-purple markings, and more or less spherical fruit.

== Description ==
Goodenia coronopifolia is a prostrate or ascending, often glabrous herb with stems 5–40 cm (2.0–15.7 in) long. The leaves at the base of the plant are 20–100 mm (0.79–3.94 in) long and 1–10 mm (0.039–0.394 in) wide, linear to oblong and toothed or divided, but the leaves on the stem are linear with smooth edges. The flowers are arranged in racemes up to 300 mm (12 in) long with leaf-like bracts at the base, each flower on a pedicel 10–30 mm (0.39–1.18 in) long. The sepals are lance-shaped to oblong, 1–2 mm (0.039–0.079 in) long and the petals yellow with brownish-purple marking and 5–9 mm (0.20–0.35 in) long. The lower lobes of the corolla are 2–3 mm (0.079–0.118 in) long with wings about 0.5 mm (0.020 in) wide. Flowering mainly occurs from May to October and the fruit is a more or less spherical capsule about 4 mm (0.16 in) in diameter.

== Taxonomy and naming ==
Goodenia coronopifolia was first formally described in 1810 by Robert Brown in Prodromus Florae Novae Hollandiae et Insulae Van Diemen. The specific epithet (coronopifolia) means "Coronopus-leaved".

== Distribution ==
This species of Goodenia grows in northern parts of the Northern Territory and Western Australia.

== Conservation status ==
Goodenia coronopifolia is classified as "not threatened" by the Western Australian Government Department of Parks and Wildlife and as of "least concern" under the Northern Territory Government Territory Parks and Wildlife Conservation Act 1976.
