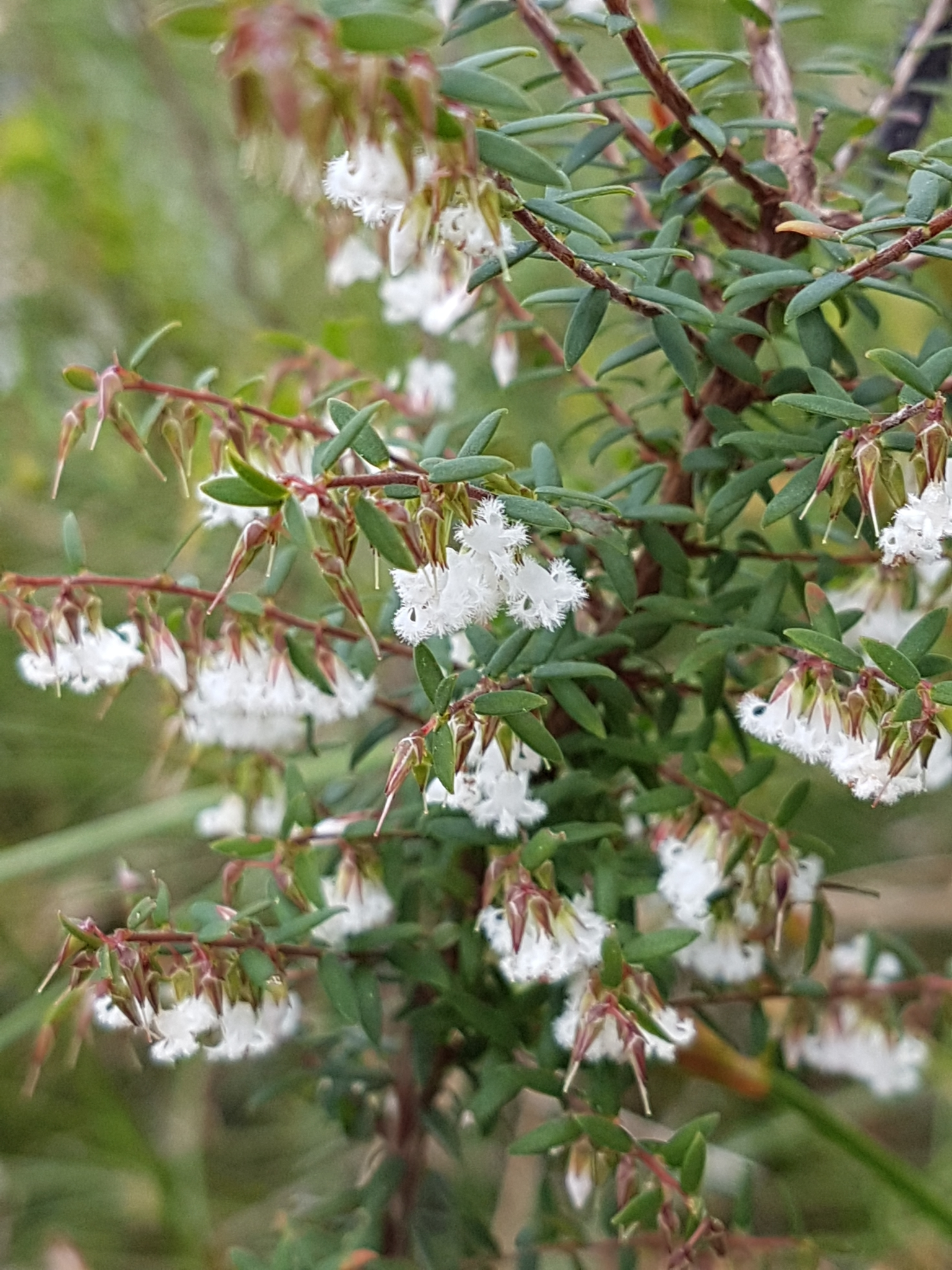
- In the Walpole-Nornalup National Park

Scientific classification
- Kingdom: Plantae
- Clade: Tracheophytes
- Clade: Angiosperms
- Clade: Eudicots
- Clade: Asterids
- Order: Ericales
- Family: Ericaceae
- Genus: Leucopogon
- Species: L. gracilis

Binomial name
- Leucopogon gracilis R.Br.
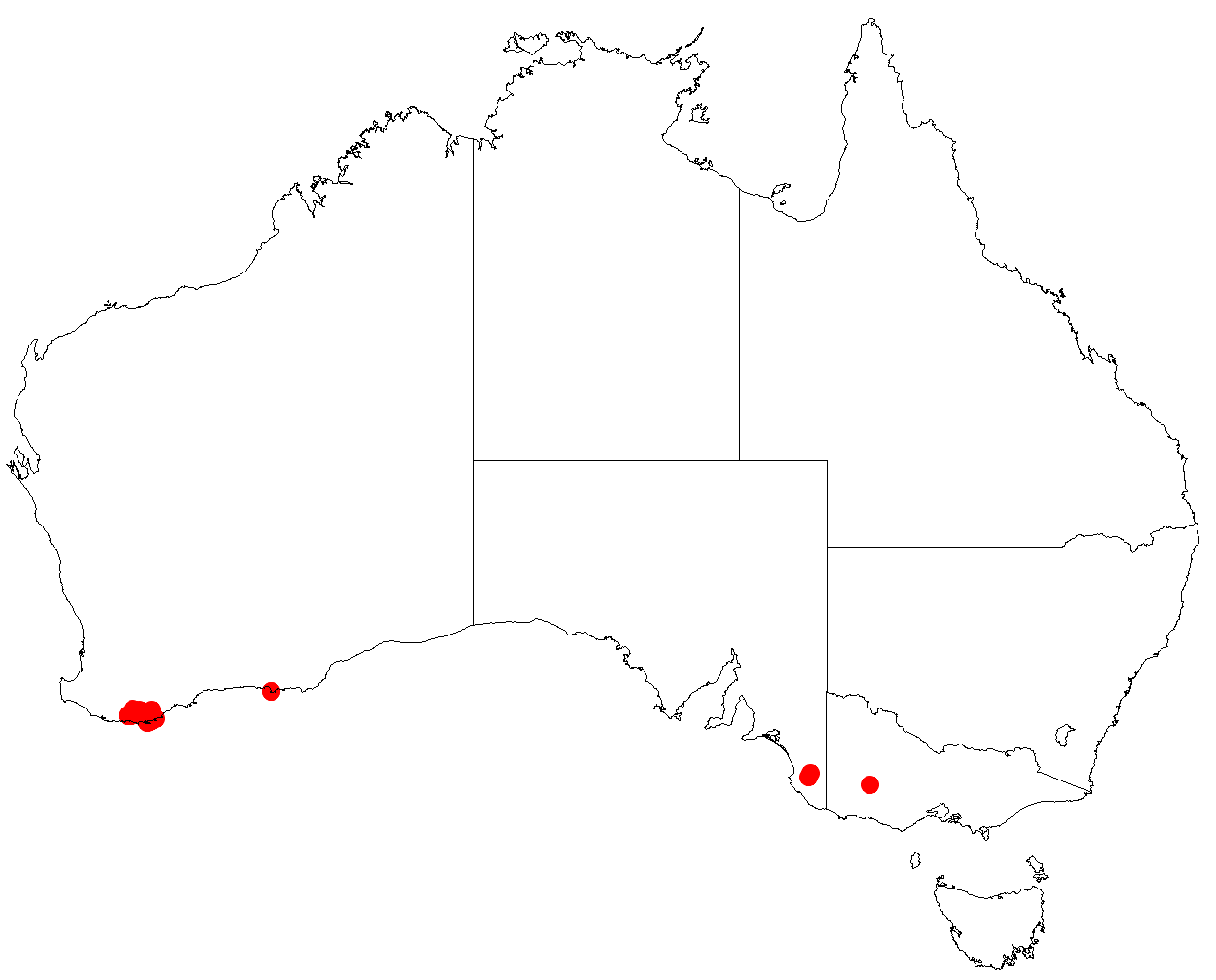
- Occurrence data from AVH

Synonyms
- Styphelia gracilis (R.Br.) Spreng.

= Leucopogon gracilis =

Species of shrub

Leucopogon gracilis is a species of flowering plant in the heath family Ericaceae and is endemic to the south of Western Australia. It is a spindly shrub with wiry branchlets, linear to lance-shaped leaves, and dense spikes of white or pinkish flowers.

== Description ==
Leucopogon gracilis is a spindly shrub that typically grows to a height of 0.15–1 m (5.9 in – 3 ft 3.4 in) and has wiry branchlets. Its leaves are linear to lance-shaped, usually 4.0–6.5 mm (0.16–0.26 in) long with 3 or 5 prominent ribs. The flowers are arranged in dense spikes on the ends of branches with small bracts and lance-shaped bracteoles about half as long as the sepals. The sepals are about 2 mm (0.079 in) long and the petals white or pinkish and about 4 mm (0.16 in) long, forming a tube with lobes about the same length as the petal tube. Flowering occurs from July to December or from January to March.

== Taxonomy ==
Leucopogon gracilis was first formally described in 1810 by Robert Brown in his Prodromus Florae Novae Hollandiae et Insulae Van Diemen. The specific epithet, (gracilis), means "slender" or "thin". A holotype, collected by Robert Brown at King George's Sound is kept at Kew Gardens.
