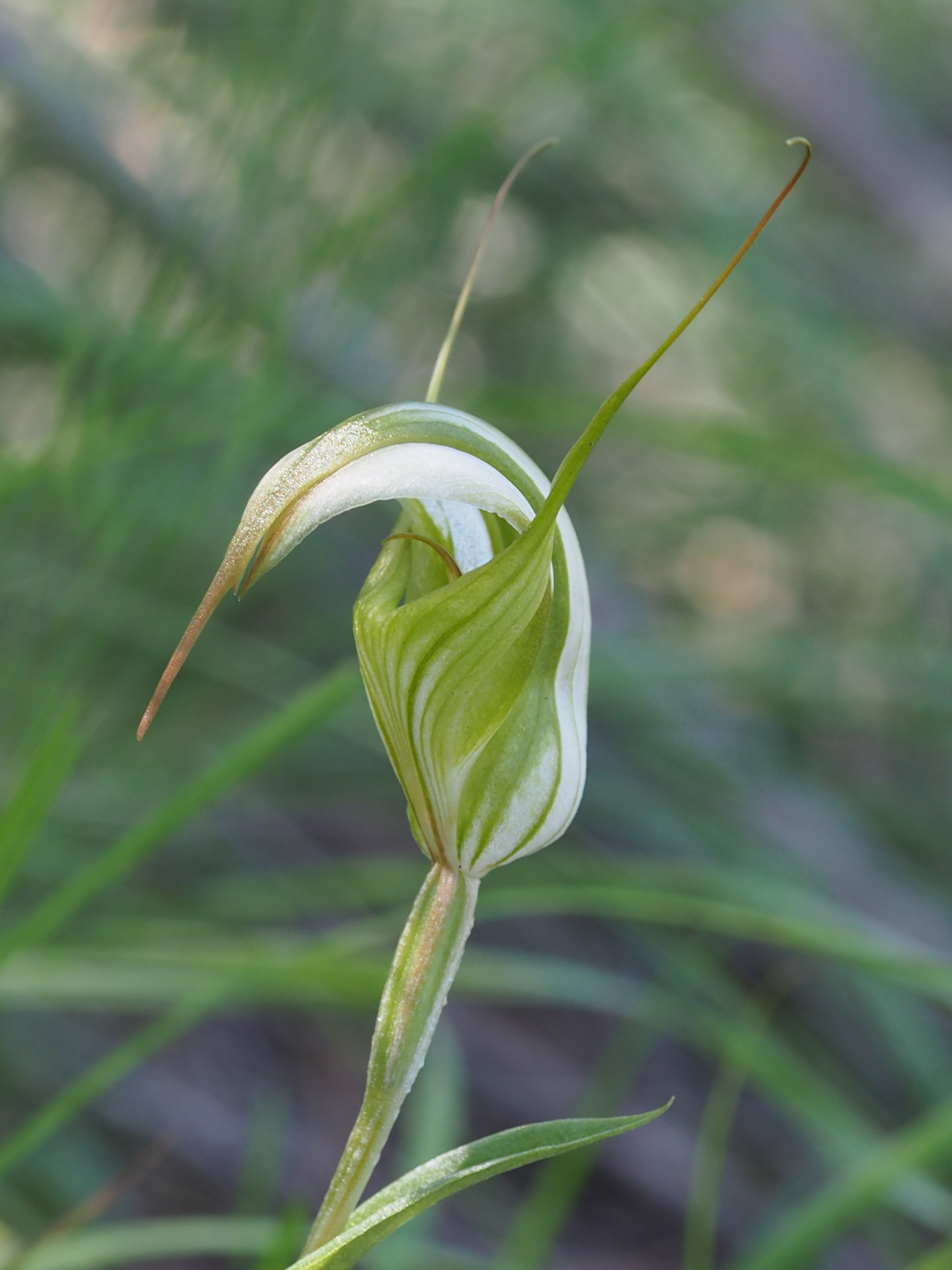
- Near Apsley Falls

Scientific classification
- Kingdom: Plantae
- Clade: Embryophytes
- Clade: Tracheophytes
- Clade: Spermatophytes
- Clade: Angiosperms
- Clade: Monocots
- Order: Asparagales
- Family: Orchidaceae
- Subfamily: Orchidoideae
- Tribe: Cranichideae
- Genus: Pterostylis
- Species: P. reflexa

Binomial name
- Pterostylis reflexa R.Br.

Synonyms
- Diplodium reflexum (R.Br.) D.L.Jones & M.A.Clem.; Pterostylis reflexa R.Br. var. reflexa; Pterostylis longipetala auct. non Rupp: Jones, D.L. in Walsh, N.G. & Entwisle, T.J. (ed.) (1994); Pterostylis longipetala auct. non Rupp: Backhouse, G.N. & Jeanes, J.A. (1995)

= Pterostylis reflexa =

Dainty greenhood

Species of orchid

Pterostylis reflexa, commonly known as the dainty greenhood, is a species of orchid endemic to New South Wales. As with similar greenhoods, the flowering plants differ from those which are not flowering. The non-flowering plants have a rosette of leaves flat on the ground but the flowering plants have a single flower with leaves on the flowering stem. This greenhood has a relatively large white, green and light brown flower with a long, curved dorsal sepal and a protruding labellum.

== Description ==
Pterostylis reflexa is a terrestrial, perennial, deciduous, herb with an underground tuber and when not flowering, a rosette of between three and seven egg-shaped leaves lying flat on the ground. Each leaf is 10–25 mm (0.4–1 in) long and 6–12 mm (0.2–0.5 in) wide. Flowering plants have a single sickle-shaped flower, 18–25 mm (0.7–1 in) long and 7–9 mm (0.3–0.4 in) wide on a flowering stem 100–200 mm (4–8 in) high with between three and five stem leaves. The flowers are white, green and light brown. The dorsal sepal and petals are fused, forming a hood or "galea" over the column, the dorsal sepal with a narrow tip 4–6 mm (0.16–0.24 in) long. The lateral sepals are in loose contact with the galea and have erect, thread-like tips 25–35 mm (0.98–1.4 in) long. There is a curved, V-shaped sinus between their bases. The labellum is 14–16 mm (0.55–0.63 in) long, about 4 mm (0.2 in) wide, reddish-brown and curved with about one-third protruding above the sinus. Flowering occurs from March to June.

== Taxonomy and naming ==
Pterostylis reflexa was first formally described in 1810 by Robert Brown and the description was published in Prodromus Florae Novae Hollandiae et Insulae Van Diemen. The specific epithet (reflexa) is a Latin word meaning "bent or turned back."

== Distribution and habitat ==
The dainty greenhood mainly grows on ridges and slopes in coastal and near-coastal forest between about Taree and Nowra.
