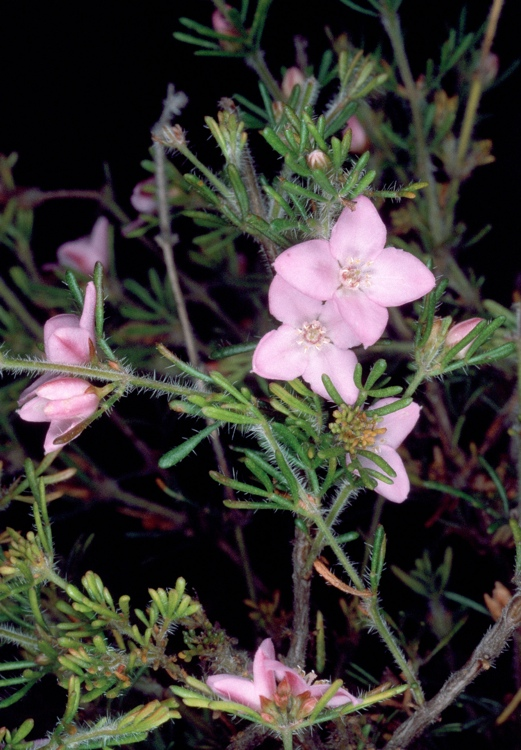
- Boronia albiflora in the Australian National Botanic Gardens

Scientific classification
- Kingdom: Plantae
- Clade: Tracheophytes
- Clade: Angiosperms
- Clade: Eudicots
- Clade: Rosids
- Order: Sapindales
- Family: Rutaceae
- Genus: Boronia
- Species: B. albiflora

Binomial name
- Boronia albiflora R.Br. ex Benth.
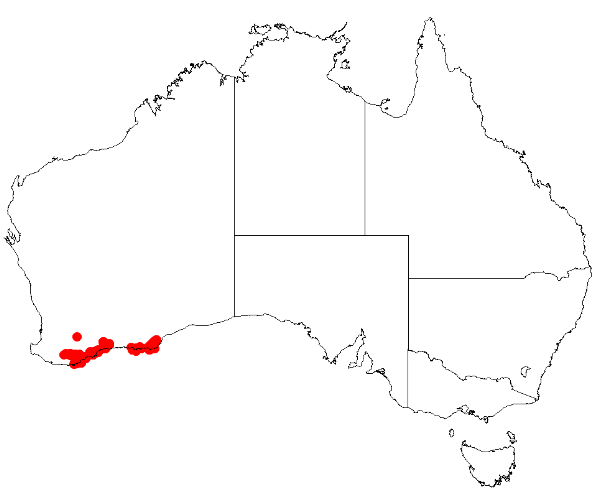
- Occurrence data from Australasian Virtual Herbarium

= Boronia albiflora =

Species of flowering plant

Boronia albiflora is a plant in the citrus family, Rutaceae and is endemic to the south-west of Western Australia. It is a soft shrub with pinnate leaves and pink or pink and white, four-petalled flowers.

== Description ==
Boronia albiflora is a soft, erect shrub that grows to a height of 0.1–0.7 m (0.3–2 ft) with its stems and branches covered with short, spreading hairs. Its leaves are pinnate with between seven and eleven leaflets, the leaflets more or less wedge-shaped and leathery with the edges often turned under. The flowers are pink or pink and white and are borne in leaf axils. The four sepals are lance-shaped to egg-shaped and covered with hairs. The four petals are glabrous, 9–11 mm (0.4–0.4 in) long and overlap at their bases. The filaments are club-shaped and have a glandular tip. Flowering occurs in most months.

== Taxonomy and naming ==
Boronia albiflora was first formally described in 1863 by George Bentham from an unpublished description by Robert Brown and the description was published in Flora Australiensis. The specific epithet (albiflora) means "white-flowered".

== Distribution and habitat ==
This boronia grows in near coastal areas in southern parts of the south-west of Western Australia, often growing in sandy soils.

== Conservation ==
Boronia albiflora is classified as "not threatened" in Western Australia by the Western Australian Government Department of Parks and Wildlife.
