= Cyperus scaber =

Scientific classification
- Kingdom: Plantae
- Clade: Tracheophytes
- Clade: Angiosperms
- Clade: Monocots
- Clade: Commelinids
- Order: Poales
- Family: Cyperaceae
- Genus: Cyperus
- Species: C. scaber

Binomial name
- Cyperus scaber (R.Br.) Boeckeler, 1875

Species of sedge

Cyperus scaber is a species of sedge that is native to north eastern parts of Australia.

== See also ==
- List of Cyperus species
