= Cyperus aquatilis =

Scientific classification
- Kingdom: Plantae
- Clade: Tracheophytes
- Clade: Angiosperms
- Clade: Monocots
- Clade: Commelinids
- Order: Poales
- Family: Cyperaceae
- Genus: Cyperus
- Species: C. aquatilis

Binomial name
- Cyperus aquatilis R.Br.

Species of plant endemic to Australia

Cyperus aquatilis is a sedge of the family Cyperaceae that is native to Australia and New Guinea.

The annual sedge typically grows to a height of 3.5 to 5 centimetres (1.4 to 2.0 in). The plant blooms between April and August producing green-brown flowers.

In Western Australia it is found around creeks and swamps in the Kimberley region where it grows in sandy-loamy soils often around laterite.

== See also ==
- List of Cyperus species
