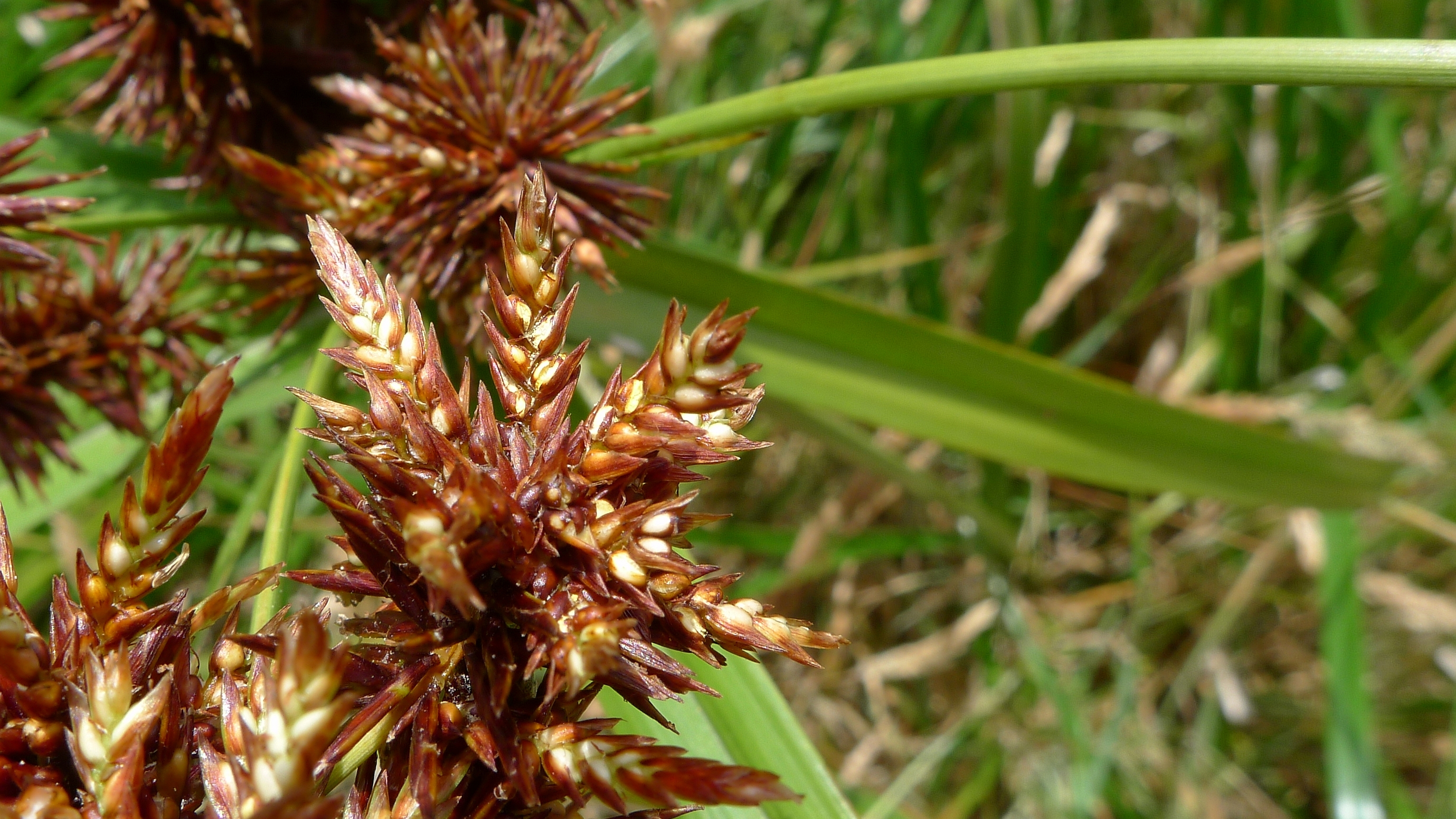

Scientific classification
- Kingdom: Plantae
- Clade: Tracheophytes
- Clade: Angiosperms
- Clade: Monocots
- Clade: Commelinids
- Order: Poales
- Family: Cyperaceae
- Genus: Cyperus
- Species: C. lucidus

Binomial name
- Cyperus lucidus R.Br.

= Cyperus lucidus =

Species of plant native to Australia and New Guinea

Cyperus lucidus is a species of sedge that is native to Australia and New Guinea.

The species was first formally described by the botanist Robert Brown in 1810.

== See also ==
- List of Cyperus species
