= Styphelia multiflora =

Conservation status
- Priority Two — Poorly Known Taxa (DEC)

Scientific classification
- Kingdom: Plantae
- Clade: Tracheophytes
- Clade: Angiosperms
- Clade: Eudicots
- Clade: Asterids
- Order: Ericales
- Family: Ericaceae
- Genus: Styphelia
- Species: S. multiflora

Binomial name
- Styphelia multiflora Spreng.
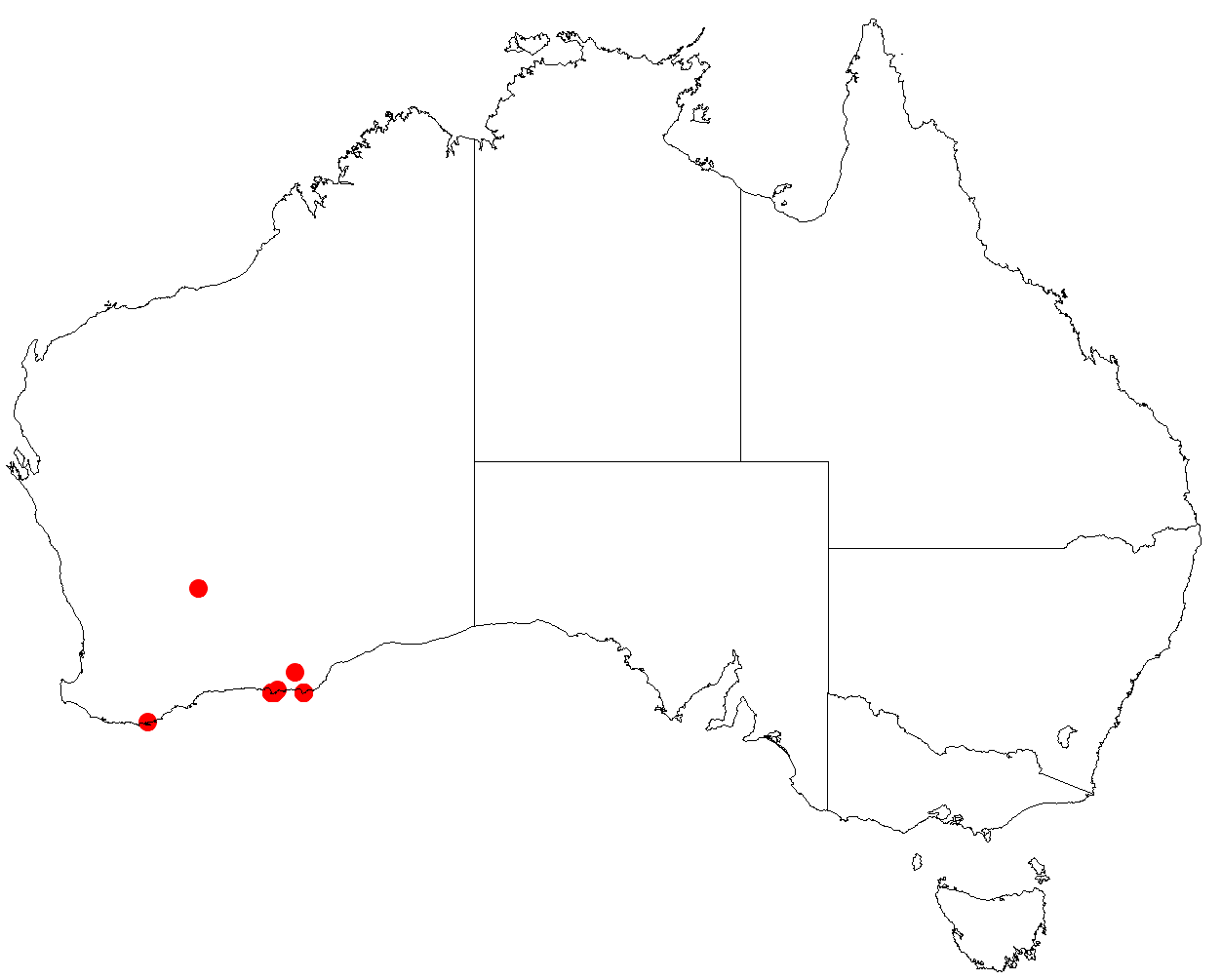
- Occurrence data from AVH

Synonyms
- Leucopogon fraseri A.Cunn. ex DC. nom. illeg.; Leucopogon multiflorus R.Br.; Leucopogon multiflorus var. ulicinus Benth.; Styphelia fraseri F.Muell.

Species of shrub

Styphelia multiflora is a species of flowering plant in the family Ericaceae and is endemic to the southwest of Western Australia. It is a rigid shrub with crowded, sharply-pointed, linear to lance-shaped leaves, and white, tube-shaped flowers usually in groups in leaf axils.

== Description ==
Styphelia multiflora is a stout, rigid shrub with sotly-hairy branches. Its leaves are crowded, linear to lance-shaped, concave, about 12 mm (0.47 in) long and sharply-pointed. The flowers are arranged in leaf axils in groups of 3, 4 or more on a short peduncle with bracts and bracteoles less than half as long as the sepals. The sepals are about 2 mm (0.079 in) long and narrow, the petals white and about 4 mm (0.16 in) long, forming a tube with lobes about as long as the petal tube.

== Taxonomy ==
This species was first formally described in 1810 by Robert Brown in his Prodromus Florae Novae Hollandiae et Insulae Van Diemen. In 1824, Kurt Polycarp Joachim Sprengel transferred the species to Styphelia as S. multiflora in his Systema Vegetabilium. The specific epithet (multiflora) means "many-flowered".

== Distribution ==
This styphelia occurs in the Esperance Plains bioregion of south-western Western Australia.

== Conservation status ==
Styphelia multiflora is listed as "Priority One" by the Government of Western Australia Department of Biodiversity, Conservation and Attractions, meaning that it is known from only one or a few locations which are potentially at risk.
