= Leucopogon tamariscinus =

Scientific classification
- Kingdom: Plantae
- Clade: Tracheophytes
- Clade: Angiosperms
- Clade: Eudicots
- Clade: Asterids
- Order: Ericales
- Family: Ericaceae
- Genus: Leucopogon
- Species: L. tamariscinus

Binomial name
- Leucopogon tamariscinus R.Br.
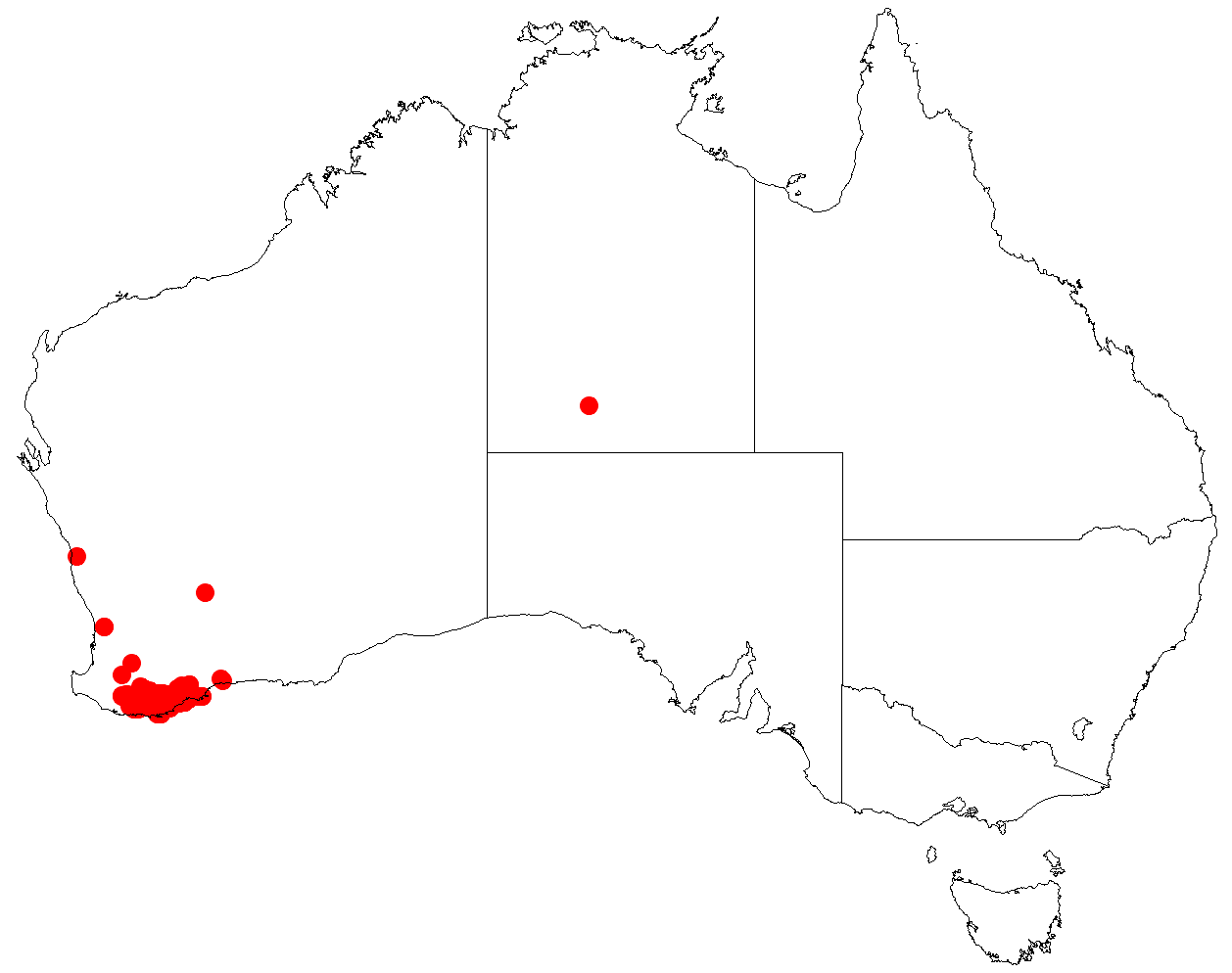
- Occurrence data from AVH

Synonyms
- Leucopogon parvifolius DC.; Leucopogon vaginans Sond.; Styphelia tamariscina (R.Br.) Spreng.

Species of shrub

Leucopogon tamariscinus is a species of flowering plant in the heath family Ericaceae and is endemic to the south of Western Australia. It is an erect shrub with egg-shaped or lance-shaped leaves and white, tube-shaped flowers arranged in dense spikes on the ends of branches.

== Description ==
Leucopogon tamariscinus is an erect, sparsely-branched shrub that typically grows to 30–70 cm (12–28 in) high and has wand-like branches. The leaves are egg-shaped or lance-shaped, 4–6 mm (0.16–0.24 in) long, and almost stem-clasping. The flowers are borne on the ends of branches in many-flowered, cylindrical spikes 12–25 mm (0.47–0.98 in) long. There are small, leaf-like bracts and broad bracteoles less than half as long as the sepals. The sepals are less than 2 mm (0.079 in) long, and the petals are white, 2.6–3.2 mm (0.10–0.13 in) long and joined at the base forming a tube with lobes about the same length as the petal tube. Flowering mainly occurs from July to December.

== Taxonomy ==
Leucopogon tamariscinus was first formally described in 1810 by Robert Brown in his Prodromus Florae Novae Hollandiae et Insulae Van Diemen. The specific epithet (tamariscinus) means "Tamarix-like".

== Distribution and habitat ==
This leucopogon grows on sandplains and on laterite ridges in the Avon Wheatbelt, Esperance Plains, Jarrah Forest and Mallee bioregions of southern Western Australia.

== Conservation status ==
Leucopogon tamariscinus is listed as "not threatened" by the Government of Western Australia Department of Biodiversity, Conservation and Attractions.
