= Goodenia hispida =

Scientific classification
- Kingdom: Plantae
- Clade: Tracheophytes
- Clade: Angiosperms
- Clade: Eudicots
- Clade: Asterids
- Order: Asterales
- Family: Goodeniaceae
- Genus: Goodenia
- Species: G. hispida

Binomial name
- Goodenia hispida R.Br.

Synonyms
- Goodenia auriculata Benth.

Species of plant

Goodenia hispida is a species of flowering plant in the family Goodeniaceae and is endemic to the Northern Territory. It is a herb with egg-shaped to lance-shaped stem leaves and racemes of yellow flowers.

== Description ==
Goodenia hispida is an ascending herb that typically grows to a height of 60 cm (24 in) with egg-shaped to lance-shaped stem-leaves 50–80 mm (2.0–3.1 in) long and 10–20 mm (0.39–0.79 in) wide, sometimes with toothed edges. The flowers are arranged in racemes up to 400 mm (16 in) long with leaf-like bracts, each flower on a pedicel 50–100 mm (2.0–3.9 in) long. The sepals are lance-shaped, 4–7 mm (0.16–0.28 in) long and the petals yellow, 15–20 mm (0.59–0.79 in) long. The lower lobes of the corolla are 7–8 mm (0.28–0.31 in) long with wings about 2 mm (0.079 in) wide. Flowering mainly occurs from February to May and the fruit is an oval capsule 10–12 mm (0.39–0.47 in) long.

== Taxonomy and naming ==
Goodenia hispida was first formally described in 1810 by Robert Brown in his Prodromus Florae Novae Hollandiae et Insulae Van Diemen. The specific epithet (hispida) means "with rough or prickly hairs".

== Distribution and habitat ==
This goodenia grows in forest in northern parts of the Northern Territory.

== Conservation status ==
Goodenia hispida is listed as of "least concern" under the Northern Territory Government Territory Parks and Wildlife Conservation Act 1976.
