= Cyperus holoschoenus =

Scientific classification
- Kingdom: Plantae
- Clade: Tracheophytes
- Clade: Angiosperms
- Clade: Monocots
- Clade: Commelinids
- Order: Poales
- Family: Cyperaceae
- Genus: Cyperus
- Species: C. holoschoenus

Binomial name
- Cyperus holoschoenus R.Br.

Species of plant

Cyperus holoschoenus is a sedge of the family Cyperaceae that is native to New Guinea and parts of northern Australia.

The shortly rhizomatous perennial sedge typically grows to a height of 0.4 to 1.5 metres (1.3 to 4.9 ft), and has a tufted habit. The plant blooms between April and August, producing green-brown flowers.

It is found in seasonally dry tropical areas in New Guinea, Queensland and the Northern Territory. In Western Australia it is found alongside creeks and rivers and in pools in the Kimberley region where it grows in sandy-clay soils.

== See also ==
- List of Cyperus species
