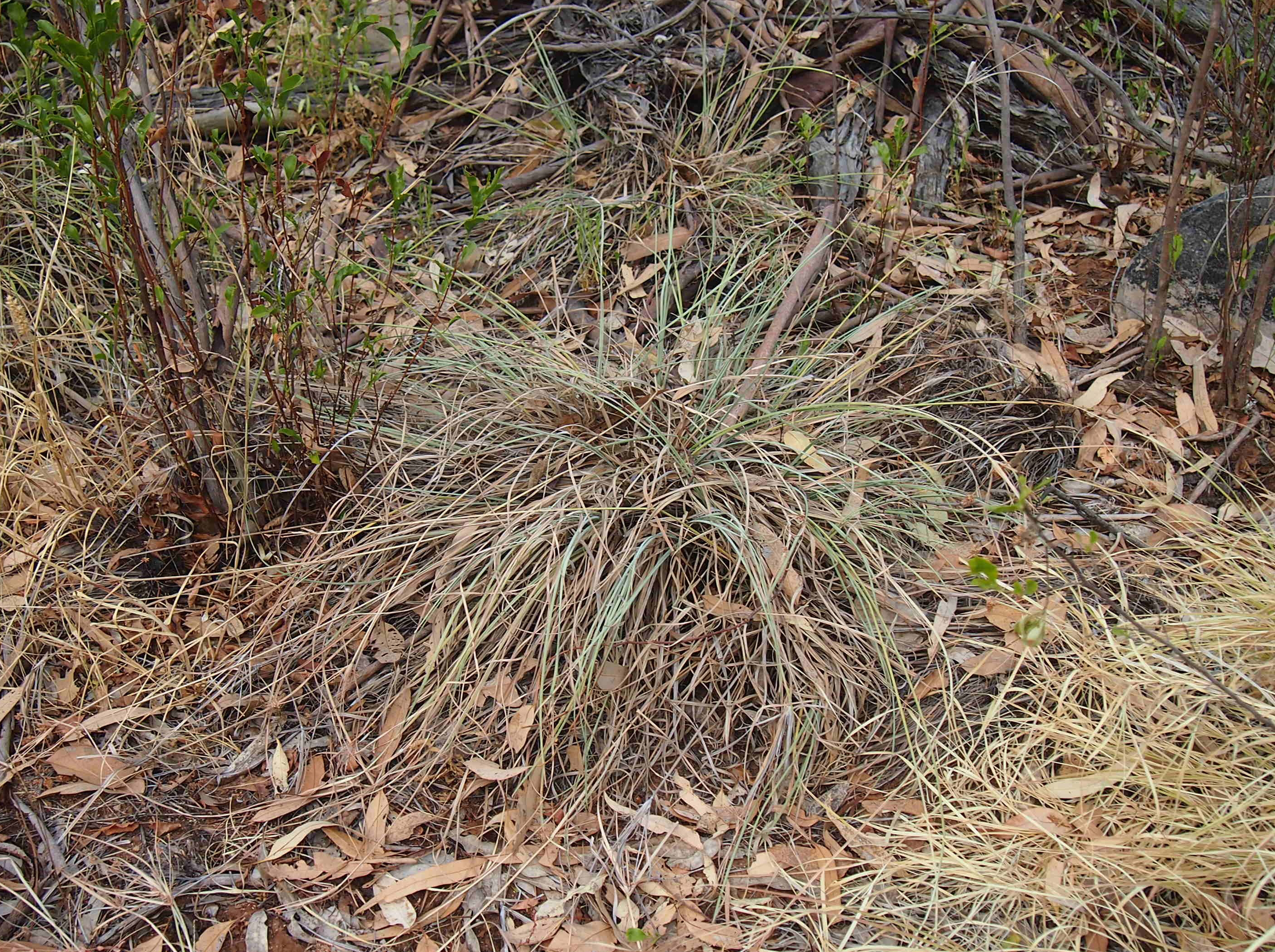
- Cyperus conicus

Scientific classification
- Kingdom: Plantae
- Clade: Embryophytes
- Clade: Tracheophytes
- Clade: Spermatophytes
- Clade: Angiosperms
- Clade: Monocots
- Clade: Commelinids
- Order: Poales
- Family: Cyperaceae
- Genus: Cyperus
- Species: C. conicus

Binomial name
- Cyperus conicus (R.Br.) Boeckeler

= Cyperus conicus =

Species of plant endemic to Australia

Cyperus conicus is a sedge of the family Cyperaceae that is native to northern and north eastern parts of Australia.

The perennial, rhizomatous and leafy sedge typically grows to a height of 0.2 to 1 metre (0.7 to 3.3 ft) in height and has a tufted habit. It blooms between March and July producing brown flowers.

It is found in the Kimberley, Pilbara and northern Goldfields regions of Western Australia where it grows in sandy-clay and lateritic loamy soils. The range of the plant extends across the north eastwards through the Northern Territory and Queensland and then south into New South Wales.

== See also ==
- List of Cyperus species
