= Cyperus imbecillis =

Scientific classification
- Kingdom: Plantae
- Clade: Tracheophytes
- Clade: Angiosperms
- Clade: Monocots
- Clade: Commelinids
- Order: Poales
- Family: Cyperaceae
- Genus: Cyperus
- Species: C. imbecillis

Binomial name
- Cyperus imbecillis R.Br.

Species of plant endemic to Australia

Cyperus imbecillis is a species of flowering plant in the sedge family that is endemic to New South Wales in eastern Australia.

The species was first formally described by the botanist Robert Brown in 1810.

== See also ==
- List of Cyperus species
