= Cyperus platystylis =

Scientific classification
- Kingdom: Plantae
- Clade: Tracheophytes
- Clade: Angiosperms
- Clade: Monocots
- Clade: Commelinids
- Order: Poales
- Family: Cyperaceae
- Genus: Cyperus
- Species: C. platystylis

Binomial name
- Cyperus platystylis R.Br.

Species of plant from Asia and Australia

Cyperus platystylis is a species of sedge that occurs in Southeast Asia and Australia.

The species was first formally described by the botanist Robert Brown in 1810.

== See also ==
- List of Cyperus species
