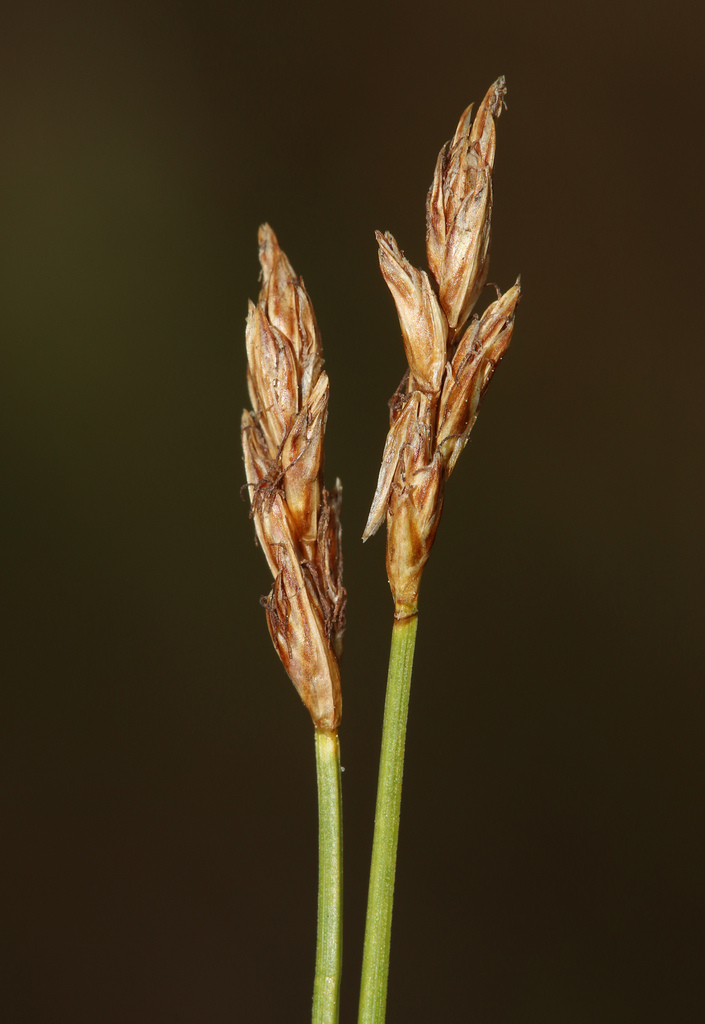
- (observed 2020-12-03 by Lachlan Copeland)

Scientific classification
- Kingdom: Plantae
- Clade: Tracheophytes
- Clade: Angiosperms
- Clade: Monocots
- Clade: Commelinids
- Order: Poales
- Family: Cyperaceae
- Genus: Carex
- Species: C. chlorantha

Binomial name
- Carex chlorantha R.Br.

= Carex chlorantha =

Species of plant

Carex chlorantha is a tussock-forming species of perennial sedge in the family Cyperaceae. In Australia it is native to New South Wales, Victoria and Tasmania.

It was first described in 1810 by Robert Brown, from a specimen collected in Port Jackson.

It flowers in spring and summer, and grows in grassland, in wet places.
