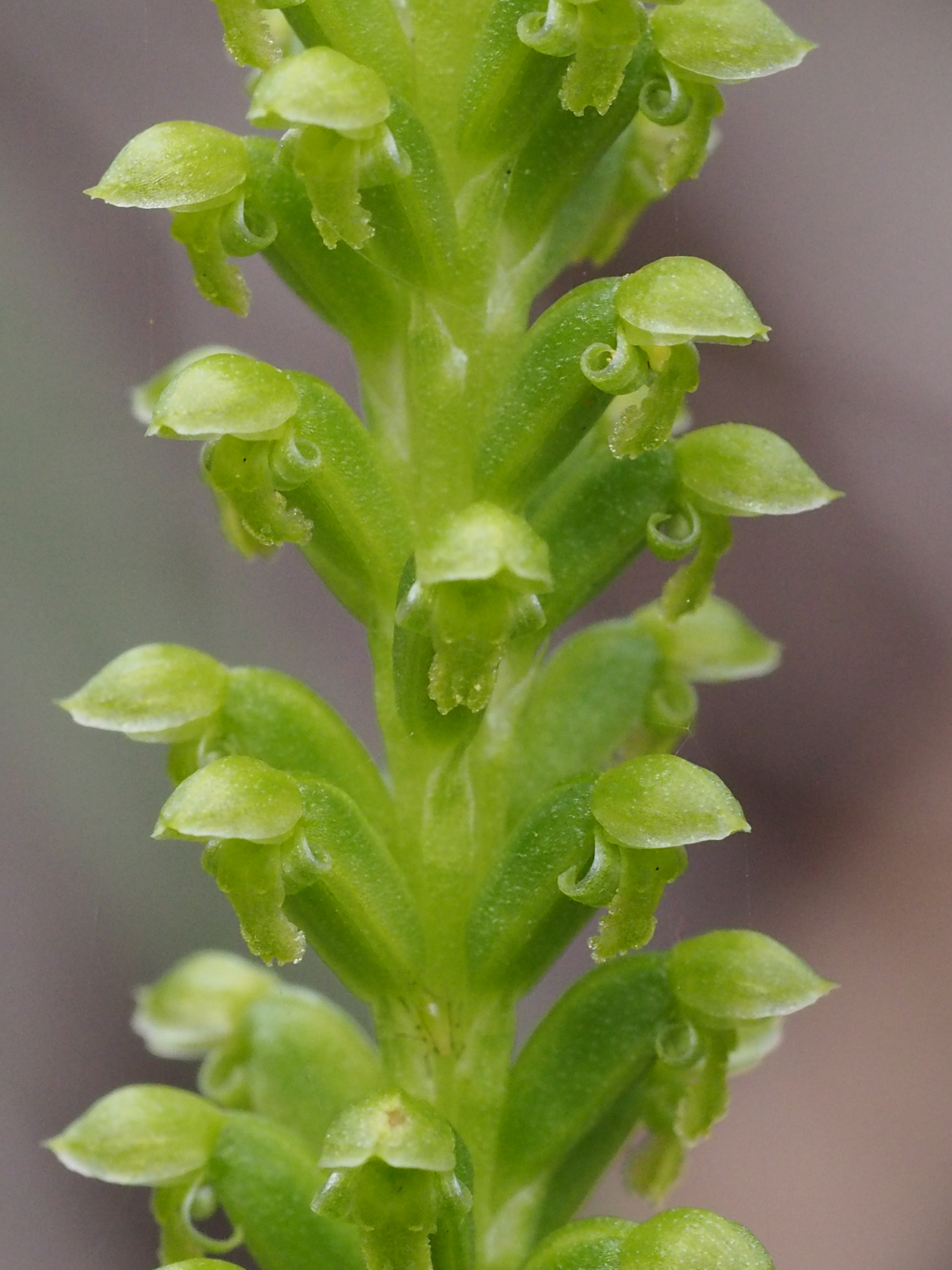
- Part of the flowering stem of Microtis media

Scientific classification
- Kingdom: Plantae
- Clade: Tracheophytes
- Clade: Angiosperms
- Clade: Monocots
- Order: Asparagales
- Family: Orchidaceae
- Subfamily: Orchidoideae
- Tribe: Diurideae
- Genus: Microtis
- Species: M. media

Binomial name
- Microtis media R.Br.

Subspecies
- See text

= Microtis media =

Common mignonette orchid

Species of orchid

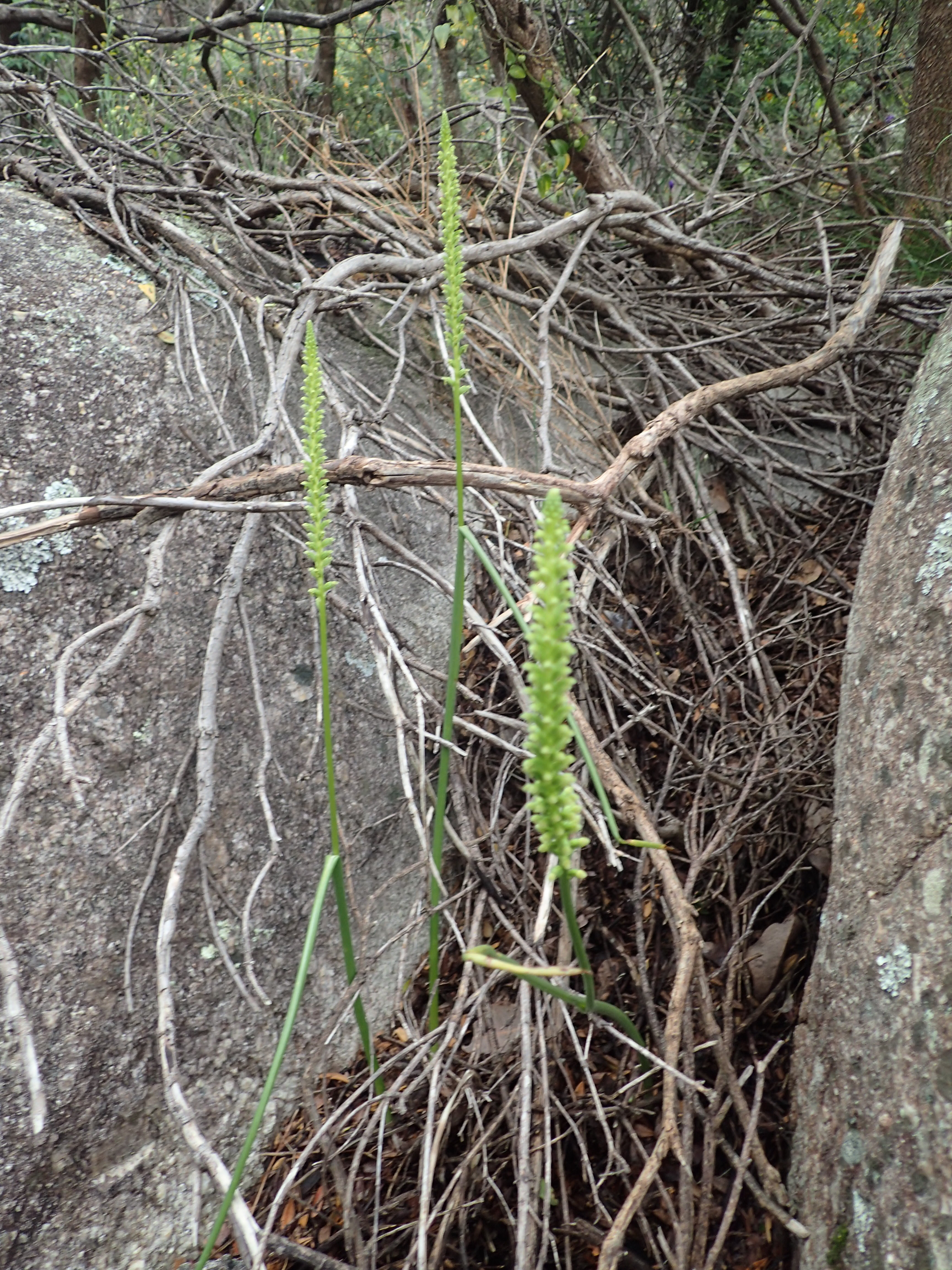
habit on Mount Melville in Albany

Microtis media, commonly known as the common mignonette orchid, is a species of herbaceous plants of the family Orchidaceae endemic to the south–west of Western Australia. It has a single tubular leaf and up to one hundred small, yellowish green flowers arranged along the flowering stem.

== Description ==
Microtis media are deciduous, chlorophyllous, sympodial, tuberoid terrestrial orchids with a single, tubular leaf 250–650 mm (9.8–25.6 in) long that encloses the lower one-third to half of the flowering stem. The flowers are green, 2.5–3 mm (0.098–0.118 in) wide, arranged around an erect flowering stem 200–600 mm (7.9–23.6 in) high. The dorsal sepal forms a hood over the column and the petals face forwards. The lateral sepals are curled. The labellum is thick and has a more or less rough, irregular margin and a raised callus.

== Taxonomy and naming ==
The species was first formally described by Robert Brown in 1810 from a specimen collected at King George Sound in 1801. The description was published in Prodromus Florae Novae Hollandiae et Insulae Van Diemen. The specific epithet (media) is a Latin word meaning "medium", referring to the intermediate floral structure.

The plant was featured in Curtis's Botanical Magazine in 1825, where it was given the common name middle-sized microtis. According to Allan Cunningham it appeared from a sod of earth containing a Cephalotus, collected by Phillip Parker King from same location, and flowered to provide the source of the illustration by Franz Bauer. The description was "Whole plant, in general aspect, very much resembling the M. parviflora represented in our last plate, but more than twice the size. The flowers too are extremely similar, and the chief difference is to be found in the lip, which is here larger in proportion to the rest of the flower, and it is singularly wedge-shaped, truncated, and obtuse, even retuse at the extremity :–the disk being moreover furnished with two oblong, warty callosities, and the margin of the lower half and apex, with several globose, tuberculated processes".

=== Subspecies ===
In 1990, Robert John Bates described two subspecies of M. media and the names have been accepted by the World Checklist of Selected Plant Families:

- Microtis media R.Br. subsp. media has a labellum with a rough, irregular edge and a prominent callus;
- Microtis media subsp. densiflora (Benth.) R.J.Bates has a labellum which is almost smooth and a reduced labellum callus.

(Microtis media subsp. eremicola and M. media subsp. quadrata have been elevated to species status as Microtis eremicola and Microtis quadrata respectively.)

== Distribution and habitat ==
The common mignonette orchid grow in shrubland, woodland and forest, often in seasonally wet areas and on granite outcrops. It occurs in the southwest of Western Australia between Shark Bay and Eyre.

== Conservation status ==
This orchid is classified as "not threatened" by the Western Australian Government Department of Parks and Wildlife.
