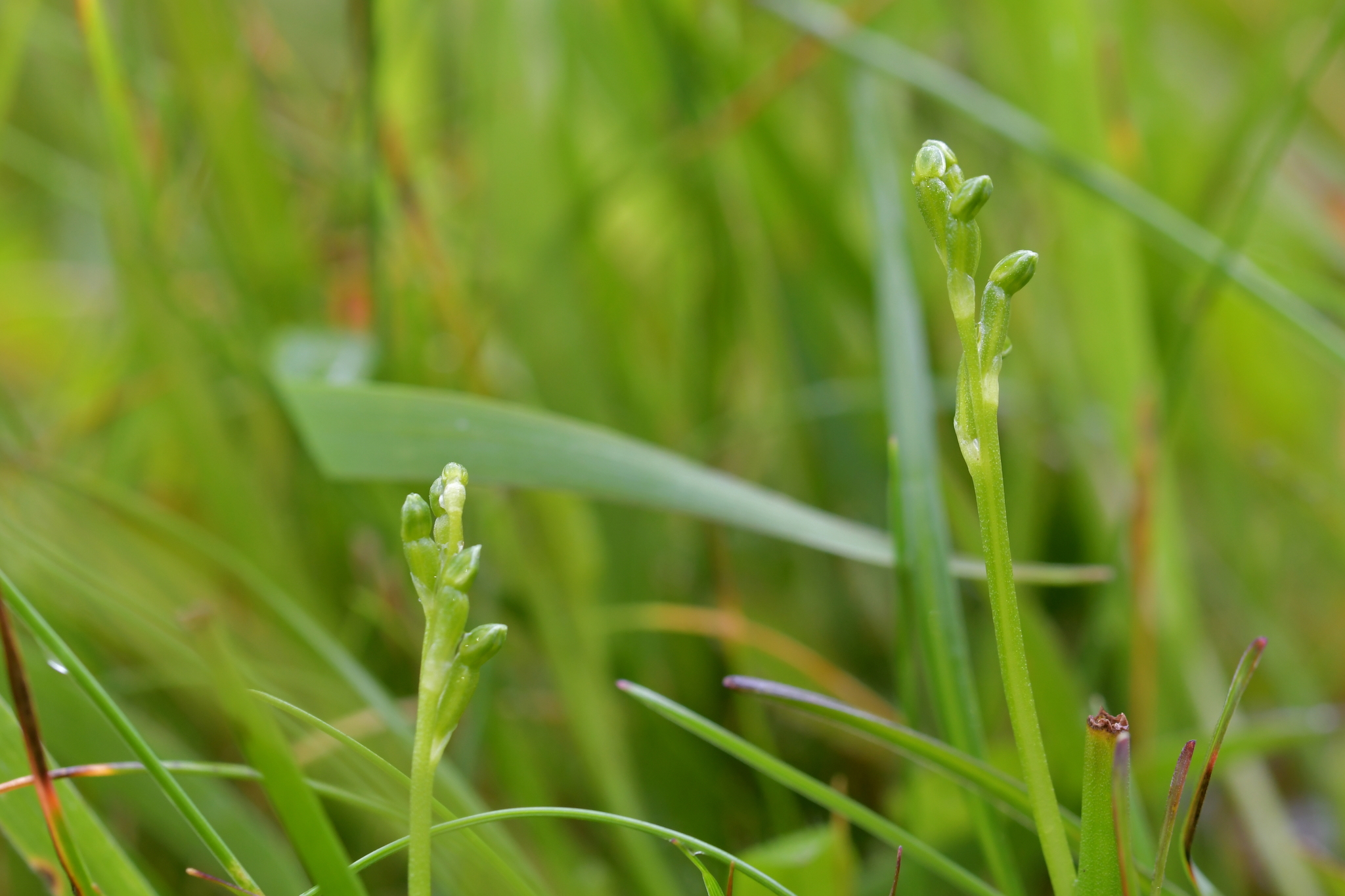
- Near Mount Kaukau, Wellington

Scientific classification
- Kingdom: Plantae
- Clade: Tracheophytes
- Clade: Angiosperms
- Clade: Monocots
- Order: Asparagales
- Family: Orchidaceae
- Subfamily: Orchidoideae
- Tribe: Diurideae
- Genus: Microtis
- Species: M. oligantha

Binomial name
- Microtis oligantha L.B.Moore

= Microtis oligantha =

Small onion orchid

Species of orchid

Microtis oligantha, the small onion orchid is a species of orchid endemic to New Zealand. It has a single thin, hollow, onion-like leaf and up to ten small green flowers. It differs from the other two onion orchids in New Zealand, (M. unifolia and M. parviflora) in being a much smaller plant with a more pointed dorsal sepal.

== Description ==
Microtis oligantha is a terrestrial, perennial, deciduous, herb with an underground tuber and a single erect, smooth, tubular leaf up to 200 mm (8 in) long. Between one and ten green or yellowish-green flowers up to 3 mm (0.1 in) are arranged along a flowering stem up to 30 mm (1 in) long. The dorsal sepal is broadly egg-shaped, 2.5 mm (0.1 in) long and hood-like. The lateral sepals are much shorter and narrower than the dorsal sepal and curve downwards. The petals are shorter than the lateral sepals and are mostly enclosed by the dorsal sepal. The labellum is oblong, up to 2 mm (0.08 in) long and curves downwards to be more or less parallel to the ovary. Flowering occurs from December to March.

== Taxonomy and naming ==
Microtis oligantha was first formally described in 1968 by Lucy Moore from a specimen collected on the edge of Lake Roundabout east of Ashburton and the description was published in the New Zealand Journal of Botany. The specific epithet (oligantha) is derived from the Ancient Greek words oligos meaning "few", "little" or "scanty" and anthos meaning "flower".

== Distribution and habitat ==
The small onion orchid grows in damp grassland and meadows in montane and subalpine parts of both the North, South and Chatham Islands.

== Conservation ==
Microtis eremaea is classified as "not threatened" in New Zealand.
