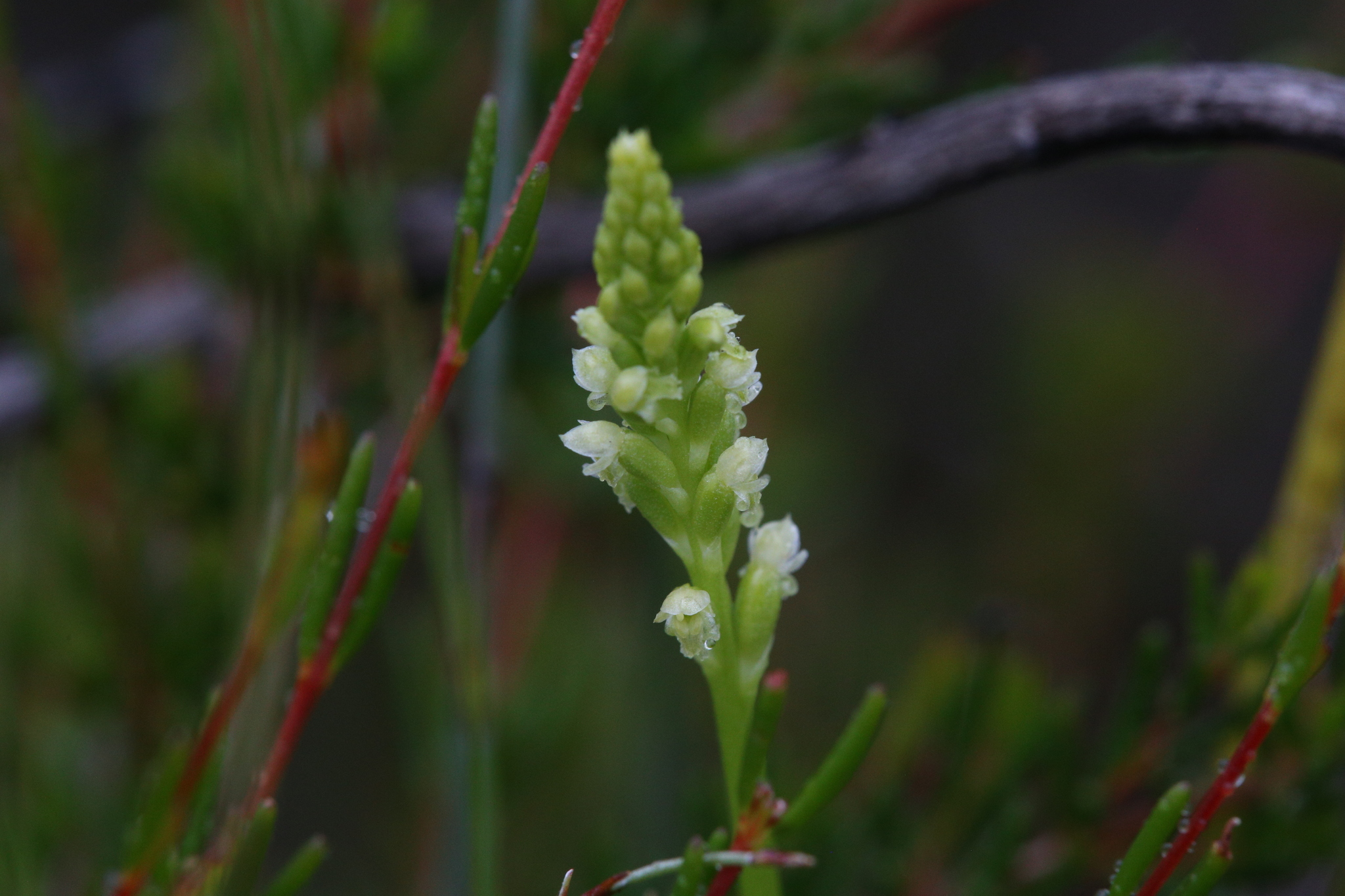

Scientific classification
- Kingdom: Plantae
- Clade: Tracheophytes
- Clade: Angiosperms
- Clade: Monocots
- Order: Asparagales
- Family: Orchidaceae
- Subfamily: Orchidoideae
- Tribe: Diurideae
- Genus: Microtis
- Species: M. alboviridis

Binomial name
- Microtis alboviridis R.J.Bates

= Microtis alboviridis =

Scented mignonette orchid

Species of orchid

Microtis alboviridis, commonly known as the scented mignonette orchid or ghost mignonette orchid is a species of orchid endemic to the south-west of Western Australia. It has a single hollow, onion-like leaf and up to forty or more small, greenish-white, sweetly scented flowers. It is similar to the white mignonette orchid (M. alba) but has smaller flowers and flowers abundantly in the absence of fire.

== Description ==
Microtis alboviridis is a terrestrial, perennial, deciduous, herb with an underground tuber and a single erect, smooth, tubular leaf 120–200 mm (5–8 in) long and 3–6 mm (0.1–0.2 in) wide. Between eight and forty or more greenish-white flowers are arranged along a flowering stem 100–300 mm (4–10 in) tall. The flowers are 3–6 mm (0.1–0.2 in) long, 2–3 mm (0.08–0.1 in) wide and as with many others in the genus, are sweetly scented. The flowers are similar to those of Microtis alba, but apart from being small, the flowers have an upturned tip on the labellum and the labellum has smaller lobes. Flowering occurs from November to December and is not stimulated by fire the previous summer.

== Taxonomy and naming ==
Microtis alboviridis was first formally described in 2008 by Robert John Bates and the description was published in The Orchadian. The specific epithet (alboviridis) is derived from the Latin words albus meaning "white" and viridis meaning "green".

== Distribution and habitat ==
The scented mignonette orchid is found in a range of habitats from seasonally wet flats to forest and occurs between Mount Lesueur and Israelite Bay, sometimes growing in populations of thousands of individuals.

== Conservation ==
Microtis alboviridis is classified as "not threatened" by the Western Australian Government Department of Parks and Wildlife.
