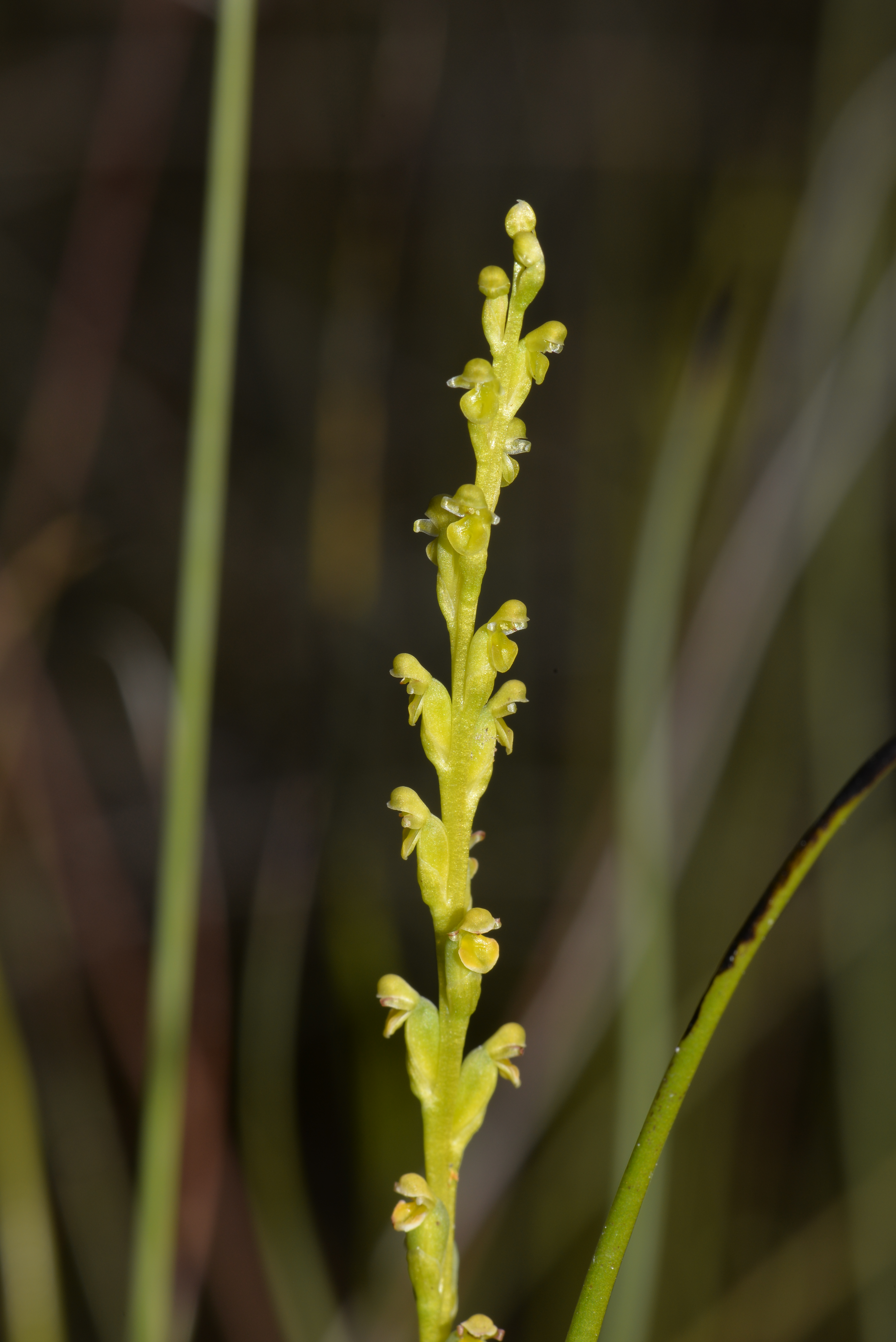

Scientific classification
- Kingdom: Plantae
- Clade: Tracheophytes
- Clade: Angiosperms
- Clade: Monocots
- Order: Asparagales
- Family: Orchidaceae
- Subfamily: Orchidoideae
- Tribe: Diurideae
- Genus: Microtis
- Species: M. orbicularis

Binomial name
- Microtis orbicularis R.S.Rogers

Synonyms
- Hydrorchis orbicularis (R.S.Rogers) D.L.Jones & M.A.Clem.

= Microtis orbicularis =

Dark mignonette orchid

Species of orchid

Microtis orbicularis, commonly known as the dark mignonette orchid, is a species of orchid endemic to southern Australia. It has a single thin, more or less hollow, onion-like leaf and up to fifty small yellowish-green and red flowers. The plants grow in winter-wet areas, often in shallow water and unlike the similar M. cupularis do not turn black as they dry.

== Description ==
Microtis orbicularis is a terrestrial, perennial, deciduous, herb with an underground tuber and a single erect, smooth, almost tubular leaf 100–300 mm (4–10 in) long and about 3 mm (0.1 in) wide. Between three and thirty yellowish-green and reddish flowers are well spaced along a flowering stem 10–50 mm (0.4–2 in), reaching to a height of 150–350 mm (6–10 in) tall. The flowers are about 3.5 mm (0.1 in) long and 2.5 mm (0.1 in) wide. The dorsal sepal is egg-shaped, 1–2 mm (0.04–0.08 in) long and wide. The lateral sepals are linear, about 1 mm (0.04 in) long, 0.5 mm (0.02 in) wide, pressed against the ovary and hidden below the labellum. The petals are lance-shaped to egg-shaped, 1–2 mm (0.04–0.08 in) long, about 1 mm (0.04 in) wide and spread apart below the dorsal sepal. The labellum is more or less round, shallow cup-shaped, fleshy, 1.5–2.5 mm (0.06–0.1 in) long and wide. Flowering occurs from September to December.

== Taxonomy and naming ==
The dark mignonette orchid was first formally described in 1907 by Richard Sanders Rogers from a specimen collected from a swamp near Myponga. In 2002, David Jones and Garry Brockman changed the name to Hydrorchis cupularis but the change has not been accepted by the World Checklist of Selected Plant Families. The specific epithet (orbicularis) is a Latin word meaning "orbicular" or "having the form of a small circle", referring to the shape of the labellum.

== Distribution and habitat ==
Microtis orbicularis grows in swamps and seasonally wet depressions, sometimes with the base of the plant submerged. It is found between Dongara and Cape Le Grand in Western Australia, in coastal areas of eastern South Australia as far west as the Eyre Peninsula, in the south-west of Victoria and on the north coast of Tasmania.

== Conservation ==
Microtis orbicularis is classified as "not threatened" in Western Australia by the Western Australian Government Department of Parks and Wildlife.
