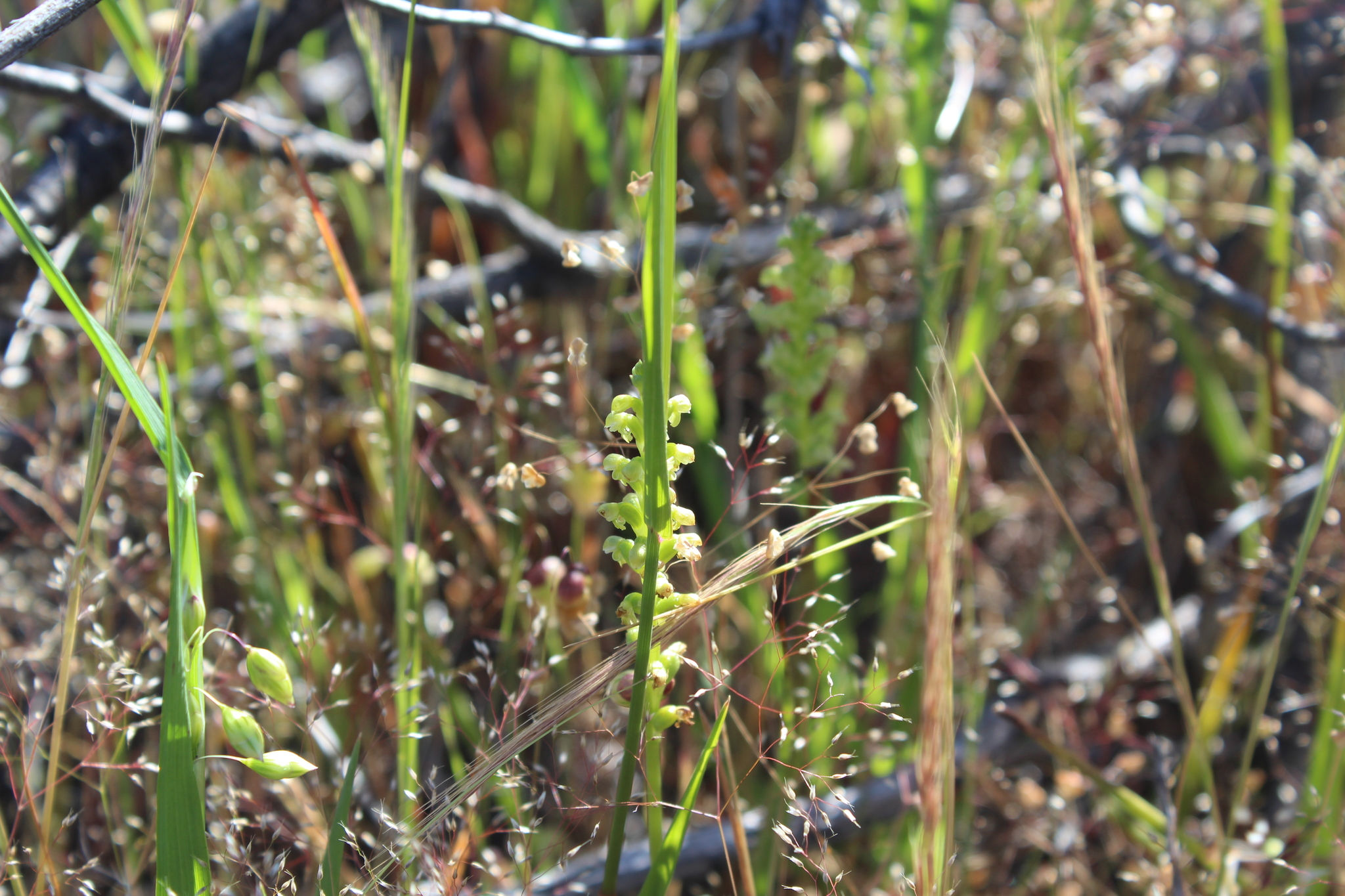

Scientific classification
- Kingdom: Plantae
- Clade: Tracheophytes
- Clade: Angiosperms
- Clade: Monocots
- Order: Asparagales
- Family: Orchidaceae
- Subfamily: Orchidoideae
- Tribe: Diurideae
- Genus: Microtis
- Species: M. graniticola

Binomial name
- Microtis graniticola R.J.Bates

= Microtis graniticola =

Granite mignonette orchid

Species of orchid

Microtis graniticola, commonly known as the granite mignonette orchid or granite onion orchid is a species of orchid endemic to the south-west of Western Australia. It has a single thin, hollow, onion-like leaf and up to sixty small green to greenish-yellow flowers. It grows in soil pockets on granite outcrops, especially where the soil receives run-off during rainy weather.

== Description ==
Microtis graniticola is a terrestrial, perennial, deciduous, herb with an underground tuber and a single erect, smooth, tubular leaf 200–500 mm (8–20 in) long and 5–8 mm (0.2–0.3 in) wide. Between twenty and sixty green to yellowish-green flowers are crowded along a stiff, rigid flowering stem 200–500 mm (8–20 in) tall. The flowers lean downwards and are 4.5–5 mm (0.18–0.20 in) long, 3–3.5 mm (0.12–0.14 in) wide with an ovary 4–5 mm (0.16–0.20 in) long. The dorsal sepal is egg-shaped, 3–3.5 mm (0.12–0.14 in) long, about 2 mm (0.08 in) wide and hood-like. The lateral sepals are oblong, 2–2.5 mm (0.08–0.1 in) long, about 1 mm (0.04 in) wide with their tips rolled downwards. The petals are oblong, about 2 mm (0.08 in) long, 0.5 mm (0.02 in) wide and are enclosed by the dorsal sepal. The labellum is oblong, 3 mm (0.1 in) long, about 1.5 mm (0.06 in) wide and curves downwards with thickened, wavy edges and a notched tip. The callus in the centre of the labellum is variable in shape, but never comma-shaped as in the otherwise similar M. eremicola. Flowering occurs from September to November.

== Taxonomy and naming ==
Microtis graniticola was first formally described in 1996 by Robert Bates from a specimen collected on Wave Rock near Hyden and the description was published in Journal of the Adelaide Botanic Garden. The specific epithet (graniticola) is Latin for "granite dweller", referring to the habitat preference of this species.

== Distribution and habitat ==
Microtis graniticola grows in shallow soil pockets on large granite outcrops in arid areas between Balladonia and Mullewa. Its distribution includes parts of the Avon Wheatbelt, Coolgardie, Geraldton Sandplains, Mallee, Murchison and Yalgoo biogeographic regions.

== Conservation ==
Microtis eremaea is classified as "not threatened" by the Western Australian Government Department of Parks and Wildlife.
