= Microtis media subsp. densiflora =

Dense mignonette orchid

Scientific classification
- Kingdom: Plantae
- Clade: Tracheophytes
- Clade: Angiosperms
- Clade: Monocots
- Order: Asparagales
- Family: Orchidaceae
- Subfamily: Orchidoideae
- Tribe: Diurideae
- Genus: Microtis
- Species: M. media
- Subspecies: M. m. subsp. densiflora

Trinomial name
- Microtis media subsp. densiflora (Benth.) R.J.Bates

Synonyms
- Microtis parviflora var. densiflora Benth.; Microtis densiflora (Benth.) M.A.Clem.

Subspecies of orchid

Microtis media subsp. densiflora, commonly known as the dense mignonette orchid, is a species of orchid which is endemic to the south–west of Western Australia. It has a single smooth, tubular leaf and a flowering spike with up to one hundred and fifty small yellowish-green flowers. It differs from Microtis media subsp. media in the shape of its flower spike and the shape of its labellum.

== Description ==
Microtis media subsp. densiflora is a terrestrial, perennial, deciduous, herb with an underground tuber and a single erect, smooth, tubular leaf 250–600 mm (10–20 in) long and 3–8 mm (0.1–0.3 in) wide. Between twenty and one hundred and fifty small greenish-yellow flowers are crowded along an erect, fleshy flowering stem 200–500 mm (8–20 in) long. Each flower is 5–6 mm (0.20–0.24 in) long and 4–5 mm (0.16–0.20 in) wide. The dorsal sepal is erect and about 3 mm (0.1 in) long, 2 mm (0.08 in) wide. The lateral sepals are about 2 mm (0.08 in) long, 1 mm (0.04 in) wide and curl downwards. The petals are about 2 mm (0.08 in) long, 1 mm (0.04 in) wide and face forwards. The labellum is thin, 2–3.5 mm (0.08–0.1 in) long, 1–1.5 mm (0.04–0.06 in) wide with irregular edges and a small callus. Flowering occurs from October to January.

== Taxonomy and naming ==
The dense mignonette orchid was first formally described in 1873 by George Bentham who gave it the name Microtis parviflora var. densiflora and published the description in Flora Australiensis. In 1990 Robert Bates included it as a subspecies of Microtis media along with subspecies media and quadrata. The last of these has since been raised to species status as M. quadrata by David Jones and Mark Clements.

The epithet (densiflora) is derived from the Latin densus (thick, crowded, dense), and -florus (-flowered) referring to the dense flower spike.

== Distribution and habitat ==
The dense mignonette orchid is found between Perth and Albany where it grows seasonally in wet placed.

== Conservation ==
Microtis media subsp. densiflora is classified as "not threatened" by the Western Australian Government Department of Parks and Wildlife.
