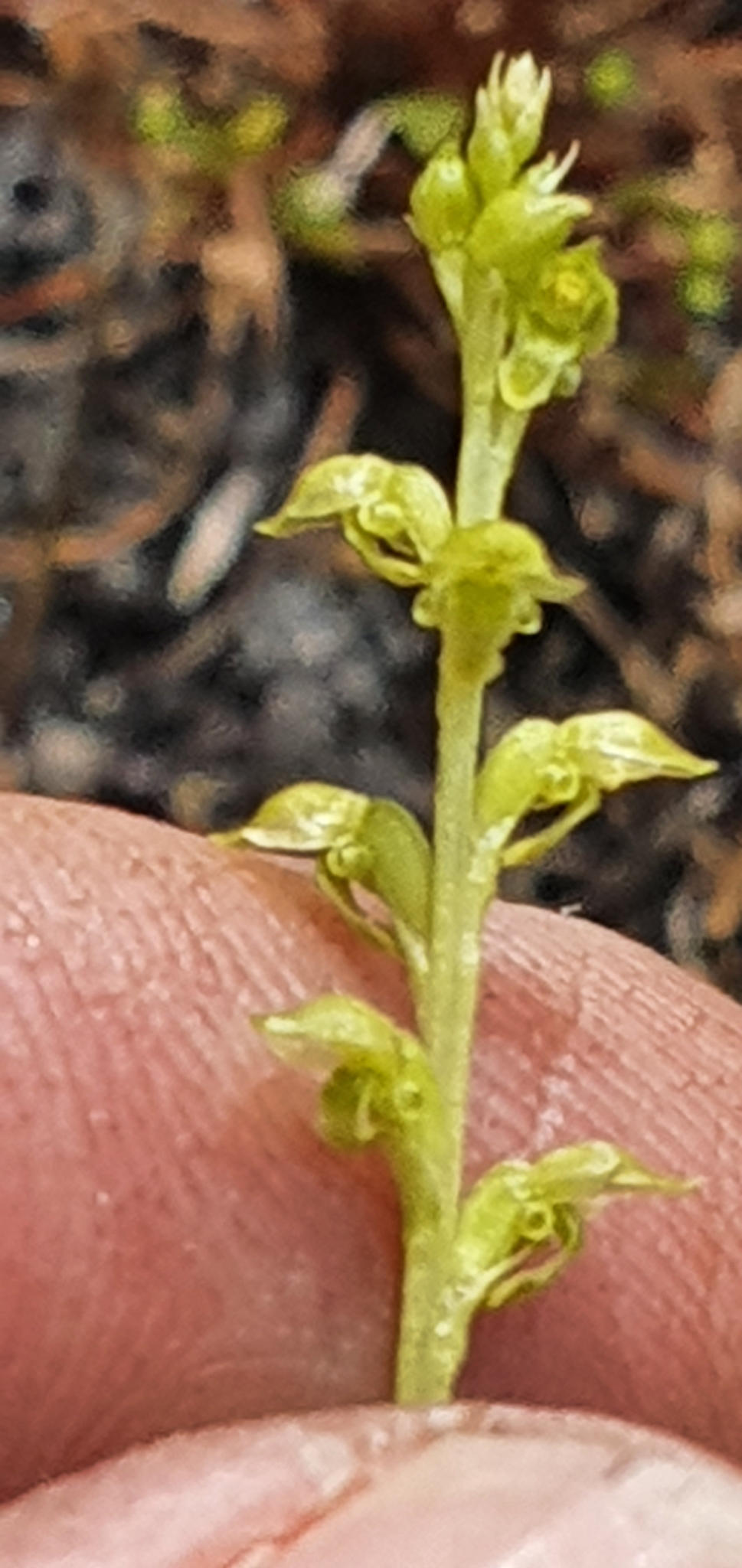

Scientific classification
- Kingdom: Plantae
- Clade: Tracheophytes
- Clade: Angiosperms
- Clade: Monocots
- Order: Asparagales
- Family: Orchidaceae
- Subfamily: Orchidoideae
- Tribe: Diurideae
- Genus: Microtis
- Species: M. brownii

Binomial name
- Microtis brownii Rchb.f.

Synonyms
- Microtis truncata R.S.Rogers; Microtis truncata R.S.Rogers isonym

= Microtis brownii =

Sweet mignonette orchid

Species of orchid

Microtis brownii, commonly known as sweet mignonette orchid or sweet onion orchid, is a species of orchid endemic to the south-west of Western Australia. It has a single hollow, onion-like leaf and up to sixty small, green and white scented flowers well-spaced along the flowering stem. It usually grows in swampy places, flowers more prolifically after summer fires and sometimes forms very large colonies.

== Description ==
Microtis brownii is a terrestrial, perennial, deciduous, herb with an underground tuber and a single erect, smooth, tubular leaf 150–500 mm (6–20 in) long and 2–6 mm (0.08–0.2 in) wide. Between five and fifty green to yellowish-green and white flowers are well-spaced along a flowering stem 300–600 mm (10–20 in) tall. The flowers are scented, about 4 mm (0.2 in) long and 3 mm (0.1 in) wide. The dorsal sepal is about 4 mm (0.2 in) long, 3 mm (0.1 in) wide and forms a hood over the column. The lateral sepals are about 3 mm (0.1 in) long with their tips rolled under. The petals are about 2.5 mm (0.1 in) long and held under the dorsal sepal or alongside it. The labellum is about 4 mm (0.2 in) long, 2 mm (0.08 in) wide with crinkled edges and bends down to almost touch the ovary. Flowering occurs from November to January but more prolifically after fire the previous summer.

== Taxonomy and naming ==
Microtis brownii was first formally described in 1871 by Heinrich Gustav Reichenbach and the description was published in Beitrage zur Systematischen Pflanzenkunde. The specific epithet (brownii) honours the Scottish botanist Robert Brown.

== Distribution and habitat ==
Sweet mignonette orchid usually grows in swampy places but sometimes in woodland, forest or inland granite outcrops. It sometimes forms colonies of thousands of plants and is widespread and common, especially between Perth and Esperance.

== Conservation ==
Microtis brownii is classified as "not threatened" by the Western Australian Government Department of Parks and Wildlife.
