= Microtis globula =

Globular mignonette orchid

Conservation status
- Vulnerable (EPBC Act)

Scientific classification
- Kingdom: Plantae
- Clade: Tracheophytes
- Clade: Angiosperms
- Clade: Monocots
- Order: Asparagales
- Family: Orchidaceae
- Subfamily: Orchidoideae
- Tribe: Diurideae
- Genus: Microtis
- Species: M. globula

Binomial name
- Microtis globula R.J.Bates

Species of orchid

Microtis globula, commonly known as the globular mignonette orchid or globular onion orchid is a species of orchid endemic to the south-west coastal region of Western Australia. It has a single hollow, onion-like leaf and up to thirty five small greenish-yellow, almost globe-shaped flowers. It often grows in large colonies but only flowers after hot fires the previous summer.

== Description ==
Microtis globula is a terrestrial, perennial, deciduous, herb with an underground tuber and a single erect, smooth, tubular leaf 100–250 mm (4–10 in) long and 3–4 mm (0.1–0.2 in) wide. Between eight and thirty five greenish-yellow flowers are arranged along a flowering stem 200–350 mm (8–10 in) tall. The flowers are almost globe-shaped, about 2.5 mm (0.1 in) long and wide. The dorsal sepal is egg-shaped to almost round, about 2 mm (0.08 in) long and wide and hood-like. The lateral sepals are triangular, about 2 mm (0.08 in) long, 1 mm (0.04 in) wide and curved with their upper edge partly overlapping the dorsal sepal. The petals are egg-shaped, about 1.5 mm (0.06 in) long, 1 mm (0.04 in) wide and are surrounded by the sepals. The labellum is 1.5–2 mm (0.06–0.08 in) long, about 1 mm (0.04 in) wide and lacks an obvious callus. Flowering occurs from December to January but only after a hot or late fire the previous summer.

== Taxonomy and naming ==
Microtis globula was first formally described in 1984 by Robert John Bates from a specimen collected near Walpole and the description was published in Journal of the Adelaide Botanic Gardens. The specific epithet (globula) is from the Latin word "globulus" meaning "a little ball" or "globule", referring to the shape of the flowers.

== Distribution and habitat ==
The globular mignonette orchid grows in peaty, winter-wet areas between Albany and Northcliffe in the Jarrah Forest and Warren biogeographic regions.

== Conservation ==
Microtis globula is classified as "Priority Four" by the Government of Western Australia Department of Parks and Wildlife, meaning that is rare or near threatened. It is also classified as "vulnerable" under the Commonwealth Government Environment Protection and Biodiversity Conservation Act 1999 (EPBC) Act. The main threat to the species is inappropriate fire regimes.
