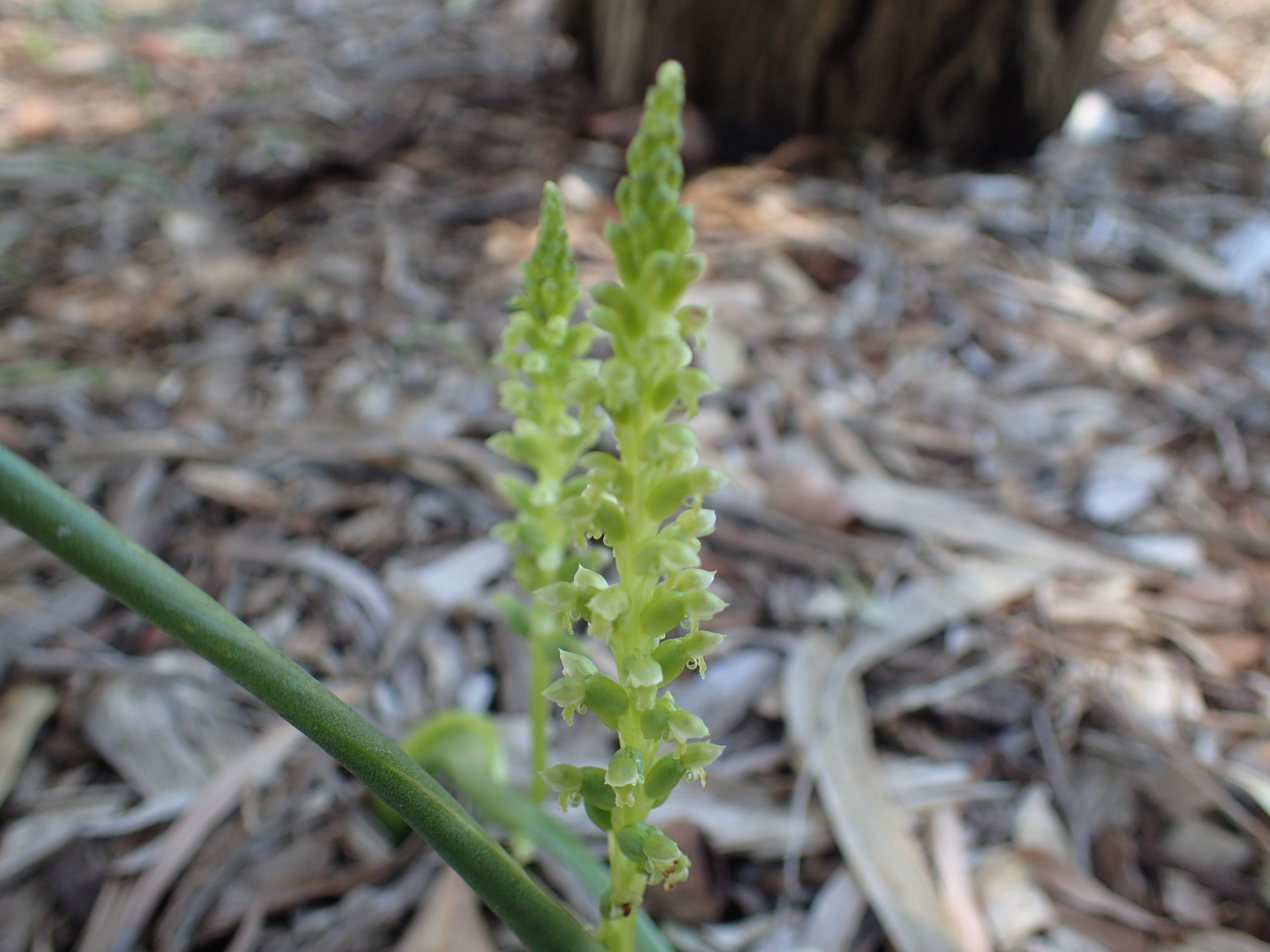
- In Kings Park

Scientific classification
- Kingdom: Plantae
- Clade: Tracheophytes
- Clade: Angiosperms
- Clade: Monocots
- Order: Asparagales
- Family: Orchidaceae
- Subfamily: Orchidoideae
- Tribe: Diurideae
- Genus: Microtis
- Species: M. media R.Br.
- Subspecies: M. m. subsp. media

Trinomial name
- Microtis media subsp. media

= Microtis media subsp. media =

Common mignonette orchid

Subspecies of orchid

Microtis media subsp. media, commonly known as the common mignonette orchid, is a species of orchid which is endemic to the south–west of Western Australia. It is a common, widespread orchid with a single smooth, tubular leaf and a flowering spike with up to one hundred small green flowers. It differs from Microtis media subsp. densiflora in the shape of its flower spike and the shape of its labellum.

== Description ==
Microtis media subsp. media is a terrestrial, perennial, deciduous, herb with an underground tuber and a single erect, smooth, tubular leaf 250–650 mm (10–30 in) long and 3–8 mm (0.1–0.3 in) wide. Between twenty and one hundred small greenish-yellow flowers are arranged on an erect, fleshy raceme. Each flower is about 3 mm (0.1 in) long and wide. The dorsal sepal is about 3 mm (0.1 in) long and with the slightly shorter petals forms a hood over the column. The lateral sepals are about 1 mm (0.04 in) wide and curl downwards. The labellum has a notched tip and thickened edges with small teeth and there are two comma-shaped calli at its base. Flowering occurs from September to January.

== Taxonomy and naming ==
Microtis media was first formally described by Robert Brown in 1810 and the description was published in Prodromus Florae Novae Hollandiae et Insulae Van Diemen. In 1990 Robert Bates described three subspecies including subspecies media, densiflora and quadrata but the last of these has been raised to species status. The epithet media is derived from the Latin medius (middle, intermediate), alluding to the intermediate floral structure".

== Distribution and habitat ==
The common mignonette orchid is found between Shark Bay and the Eyre Bird Observatory. It grows in a range of habitats ranging from forests to soil pockets on granite outcrops.

== Conservation ==
Microtis media subsp. media is classified as "not threatened" by the Western Australian Government Department of Biodiversity, Conservation and Attractions.
