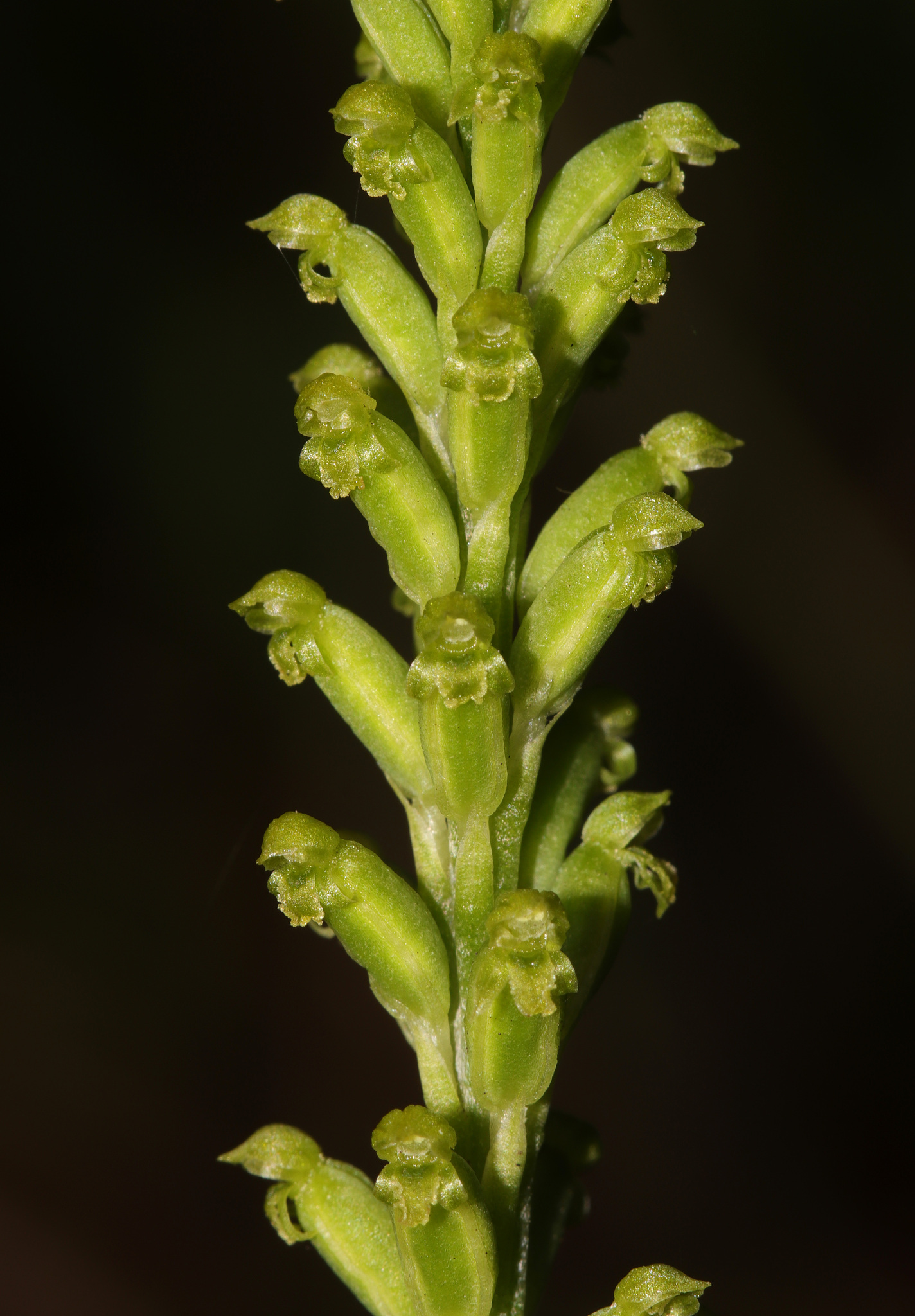

Conservation status
- Endangered (EPBC Act)

Scientific classification
- Kingdom: Plantae
- Clade: Tracheophytes
- Clade: Angiosperms
- Clade: Monocots
- Order: Asparagales
- Family: Orchidaceae
- Subfamily: Orchidoideae
- Tribe: Diurideae
- Genus: Microtis
- Species: M. angusii

Binomial name
- Microtis angusii D.L.Jones

= Microtis angusii =

Mona Vale onion orchid

Species of orchid

Microtis angusii, commonly known as the Mona Vale onion orchid, and Angus's onion orchid is a species of orchid endemic to New South Wales. It has a single hollow, onion-like leaf and up to sixty small, crowded green flowers. It is only known from a single population near Ingleside where it grows in soil that may have been imported from elsewhere.

== Description ==
Microtis angusii is a terrestrial, perennial, deciduous, herb with an underground tuber and a single erect, smooth, tubular leaf 400–1,400 mm (20–60 in) long and 5–8 mm (0.2–0.3 in) wide. Between twenty and sixty green flowers are arranged along a flowering stem 250–600 mm (10–20 in) tall. The flowers are 2.5–3 mm (0.098–0.12 in) long and 2–2.5 mm (0.08–0.1 in) wide. The dorsal sepal is 2–2.5 mm (0.08–0.1 in) long, about 2 mm (0.08 in) wide and the lateral sepals are a similar length but narrower with their tips rolled under. The petals are about 1 mm (0.04 in) long and wide and are held under the dorsal sepal. The labellum is 1.5–2 mm (0.06–0.08 in) long, about 1 mm (0.04 in) wide with a lumpy edge and a shallow notch on the tip. Flowering occurs from May to October.

== Taxonomy and naming ==
Microtis angusii was first formally described by David Jones in 1996 and the description was published in The Orchadian. The specific epithet (angusii) honours Reginald James Angus who discovered the species in 1987.

== Distribution and habitat ==
The Mona Vale onion orchid grows is only known from a single disturbed site at the type location near Ingleside. The site was previously used as a soil dump and as a parking area for work vehicles. It is possible that the orchid has germinated in the imported soil.

== Conservation ==
Microtis angusii is listed as "Endangered" under the New South Wales Biodiversity Conservation Act 2016 and under the Commonwealth Government Environment Protection and Biodiversity Conservation Act 1999 (EPBC) Act. The species is threatened mainly by weed invasion as well as by illegal rubbish dumping, grazing by rabbits and other herbivores and habitat degradation due to unrestricted access.
