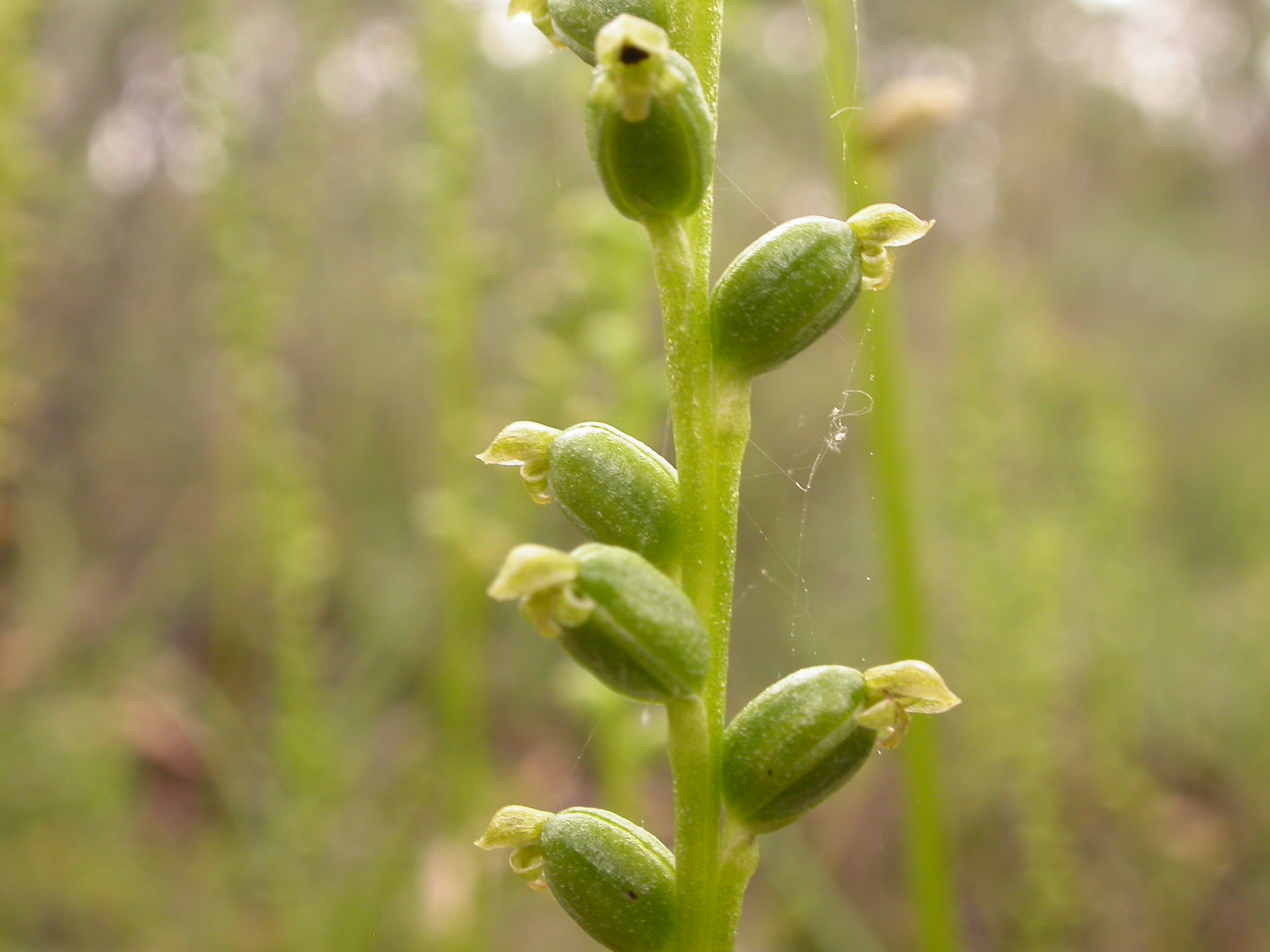
- Microtis parviflora in the A.C.T.

Scientific classification
- Kingdom: Plantae
- Clade: Tracheophytes
- Clade: Angiosperms
- Clade: Monocots
- Order: Asparagales
- Family: Orchidaceae
- Subfamily: Orchidoideae
- Tribe: Diurideae
- Subtribe: Prasophyllinae
- Genus: Microtis; R.Br.

Synonyms
- Goadbyella R.S.Rogers; Hydrorchis D.L.Jones & M.A.Clem.; Microtidium D.L.Jones & M.A.Clem

= Microtis (plant) =

Onion orchids

Genus of orchids

Microtis, commonly known as onion orchids or mignonette orchids is a genus of about 20 species of plants in the orchid family, Orchidaceae. Onion orchids are terrestrial herbs with a single leaf at the base of the plant. They are similar to orchids in the genus Prasophyllum in that they have an onion-like leaf. The flowers are small but often scented and attractive to their insect pollinators. They are widespread in Asia, Australia and some Pacific islands.

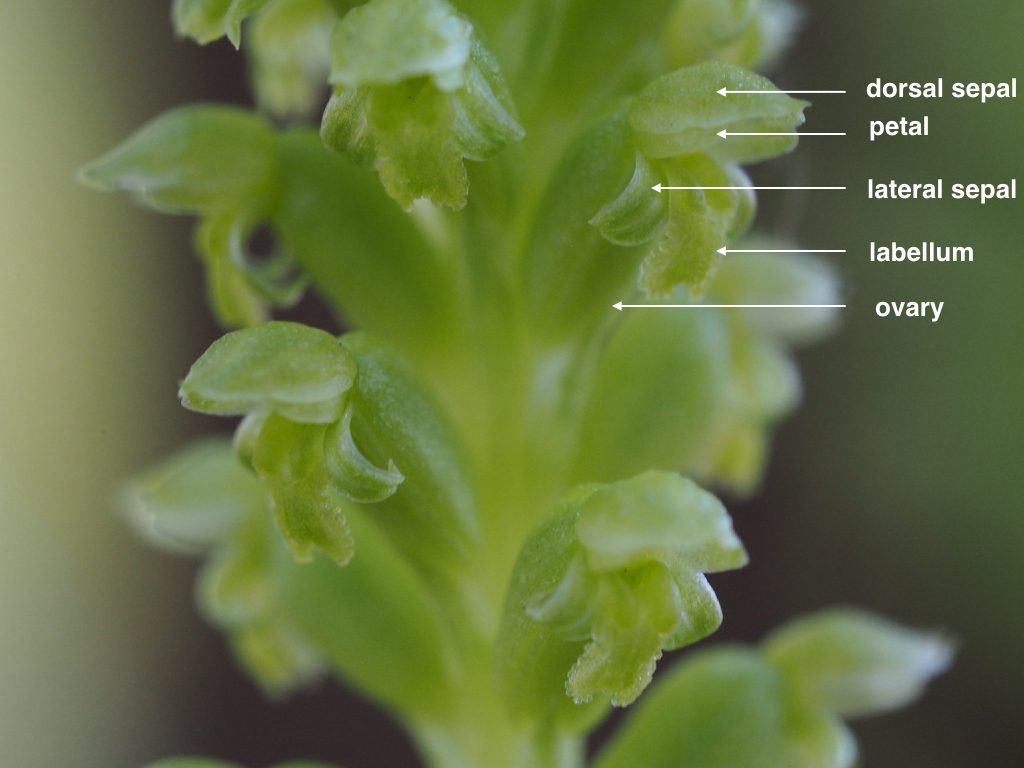
Microtis media subsp. media labelled close up image

== Description ==
Orchids in the genus Microtis are terrestrial, perennial, deciduous, sympodial herbs with a few inconspicuous, fine roots and an egg-shaped to almost spherical tuber. The tuber often produces two tubers on the end of long, root-like stolons. There is a single, linear, cylindrical, onion-like leaf at the base of the plant. The leaf resembles that of the closely related genus Prasophyllum except that is entirely green (usually red at the base in Prasophyllum) and exudes clear mucilage when damaged.

The inflorescence is a raceme with a few to many resupinate green flowers spirally arranged on a flowering stem. Each flower has a short stalk with a small bract near its base. The broad dorsal sepal is sharp-pointed, dished on the lower side and forms a horizontal hood over the column. The lateral sepals are similar to, but much narrower than the dorsal sepal. The petals are smaller than the sepals, thin and are spread below or under the dorsal sepal. As is usual in orchids, one petal is highly modified as the central labellum. The labellum is egg-shaped to oblong and hangs or is curved against the ovary. The sexual parts of the flower are fused to the column, which is shaped like half a cylinder. Flowering time depends on the climatic region where the species is found and the fruit that follows flowering is a non-fleshy, dehiscent capsule containing up to 500 seeds.

== Taxonomy and naming ==
The genus Microtis was first formally described by Robert Brown in 1810 and the description was published in Prodromus Florae Novae Hollandiae. Brown described five species at the time (M. parviflora, M. rara, M. media, M. alba and M. pulchella) but did not nominate a type species. The name Microtis is derived from the ancient Greek words mikros (μικρός) meaning "small" and ous, gen ōtos (οὖς, gen ὠτός) meaning "ear", referring to the small, ear-like appendages on the column.

== Distribution and habitat ==
Onion orchids are widespread in temperate areas of Australia and in sub-tropical Queensland, occurring in all states but not the Northern Territory. Microtis parviflora and M. unifolia are the most widely distributed species and also occur on both main islands of New Zealand and as far south as Stewart and possibly Auckland Islands as well as New Caledonia, and Norfolk, Lord Howe and the Kermadec Islands in the western Pacific. These two species are also found in Malaysia, Indonesia, the Philippines, Taiwan, southern Japan, the Ryukyu Islands and possibly in mainland China. They usually grow in areas that are wet in winter or in areas of high rainfall.

== Ecology ==
=== Disease ===
The leaves of onion orchids are susceptible to fungal disease and most leaves appear to have some damage. The rust Uromyces microtidis has been identified as a pathogen.

=== Pollination ===
Microtis flowers are insect pollinated. For some species, the insect is a small wasp from a species of Ichneumonidae or Braconidae. Microtis are rarely pollinated by ants because the mouthparts of ants usually have antibiotic secretions which damage pollen grains. However, several species of Microtis, including M. parviflora are pollinated by wingless worker ants from the genera Iridomyrmex (Family Dolichoderinae), Meranops (Family Myrmeciinae) and Rhytidoponera (Family Ponerinae), having been attracted by nectar secreted from the base of the labellum.

=== Autogamy ===
Autogamy has been observed in several species of onion orchid. In some cases, the pollen grains fall onto the stigma and germinate but in others, including in some populations of M. parvifolia, if the flowers have not been cross-pollinated, the stigma grows upwards until it contacts the pollinia, so that seed is always produced.

== Species ==
The taxonomy of Microtis has been confused ever since Robert Brown first described the genus. He did not include Ophrys unifolia G.Forst. (1786) and Epipactis porrifolia Sw. (1800) and these names were used by later authors, although now recognised as Microtis media. The small size of the flowers and their tendency to change when dried as herbarium species led to further confusion.

- Microtis alba R.Br. (1810) – white mignonette orchid (SW Australia)
- Microtis alboviridis R.J.Bates (2008) – scented mignonette orchid (SW Australia)
- Microtis angusii D.L.Jones (1996) – Mona Vale onion orchid (New South Wales)
- Microtis arenaria Lindl. (1840) – notched onion orchid (south-east Australia)
- Microtis atrata Lindl. (1840) – swamp mignonette orchid (southern Australia)
- Microtis brownii Rchb.f. (1871) – sweet mignonette orchid (SW Australia)
- Microtis cupularis (D.L.Jones & G.Brockman) A.P.Br. (2005) – cupped mignonette orchid (SW Australia)
- Microtis eremaea R.J.Bates (1996) – slender mignonette orchid (SW Australia)
- Microtis eremicola (R.J.Bates) D.L.Jones & M.A.Clem. (1996) – desert mignonette orchid (SW Australia)
- Microtis familiaris R.J.Bates (1990) – coastal mignonette orchid (SW Australia)
- Microtis globula R.J.Bates (1984) – globular mignonette orchid (SW Australia)
- Microtis gracilenta R.J.Bates (2015) (South Australia)
- Microtis graniticola R.J.Bates, (1984) – globular mignonette orchid (SW Australia)
- Microtis media R.Br. (1810) (SW Australia)
  - Microtis media subsp. densiflora (Benth.) R.J.Bates, (1990) – dense mignonette orchid (SW Australia)
  - Microtis media subsp. R.Br. media – common mignonette orchid (SW Australia)
- Microtis oblonga R.S.Rogers (1923) – sweet onion orchid (SE Australia)
- Microtis oligantha L.B.Moore, (1968) – small onion orchid (New Zealand)
- Microtis orbicularis R.S.Rogers (1907) – dark mignonette orchid (southern Australia)
- Microtis parviflora R.Br. (1810) – slender onion orchid (all Australian states)
- Microtis pulchella R.Br. (1810) – beautiful mignonette orchid (SW Australia)
- Microtis quadrata (R.J.Bates) D.L.Jones & M.A.Clem. (1996) – south coast mignonette orchid (SW Australia)
- Microtis rara R.Br., Prodr. (1810) – scented onion orchid (all Australian states)
- Microtis unifolia (G.Forst.) Rchb.f. (1871) – common onion orchid (widespread from China, Japan, Philippines, Indonesia, Australia, New Zealand)

== Use in horticulture ==
Most Microtis are very easy to grow, and readily volunteer themselves in other pots. Onion orchids are often found in gardens around Melbourne from wind-born seed.

=== Gallery ===
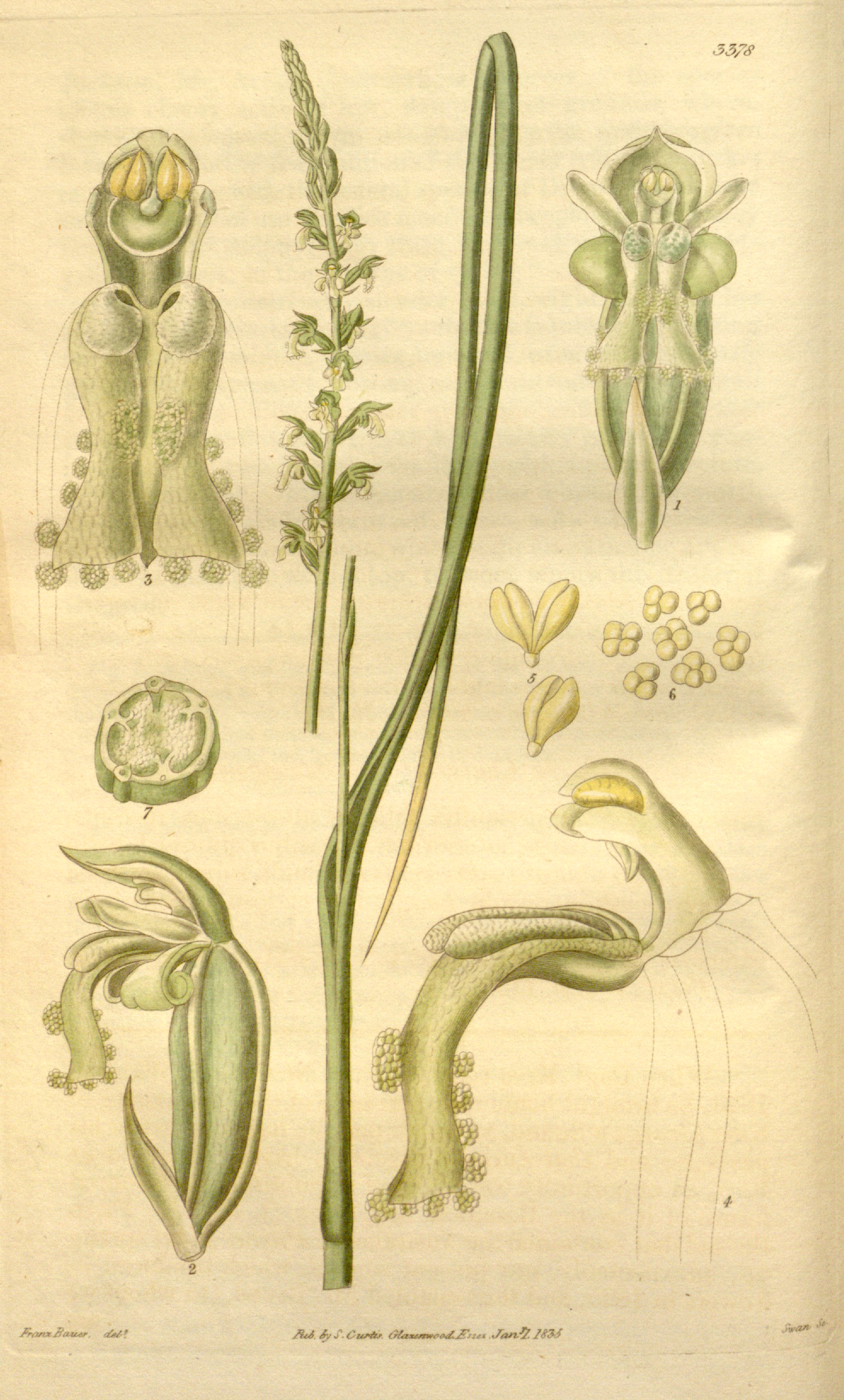
Franz Bauer's 1835 illustration of Microtis media from Curtis's Botanical Magazine

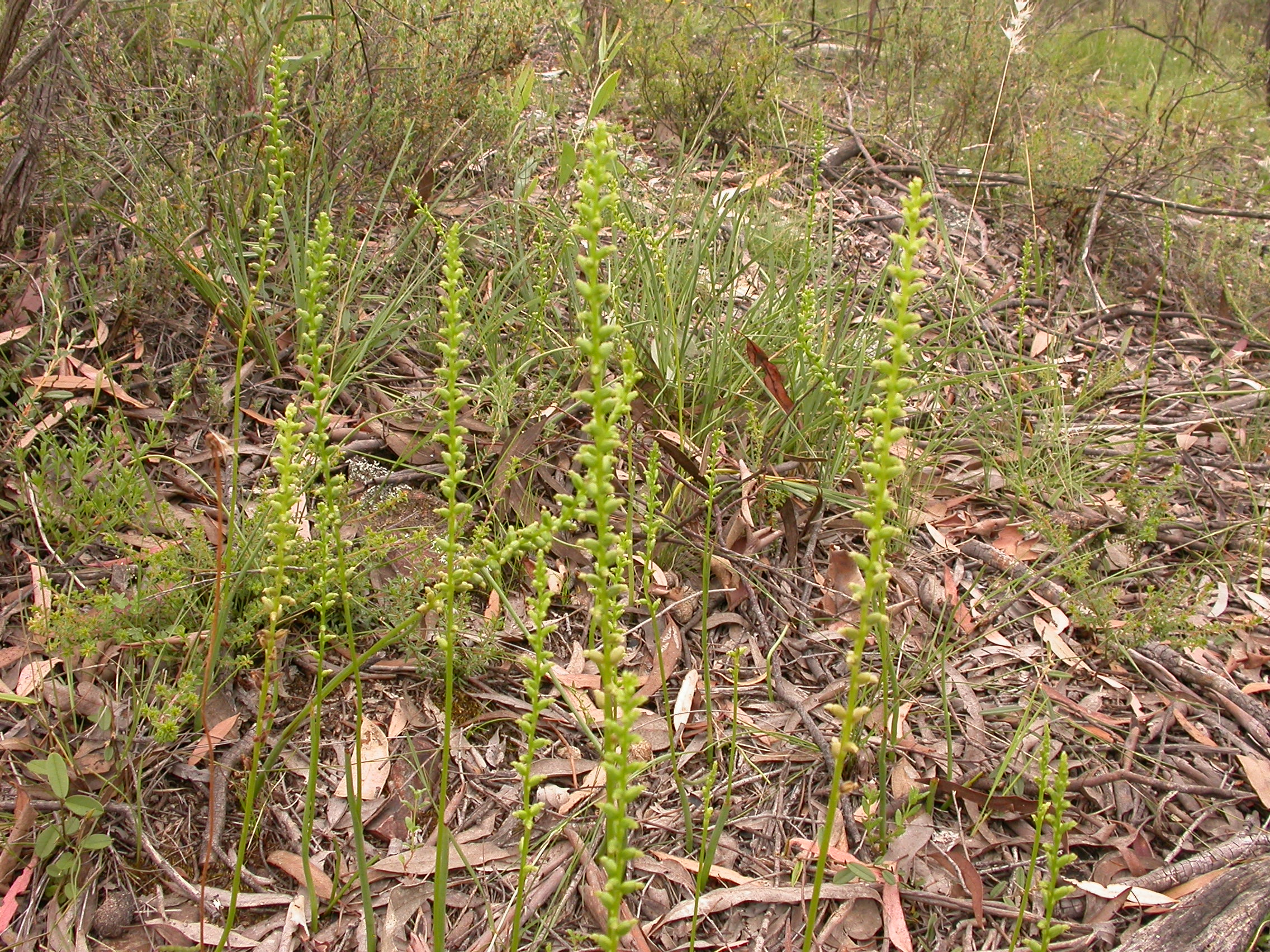
Microtis parviflora (habit)

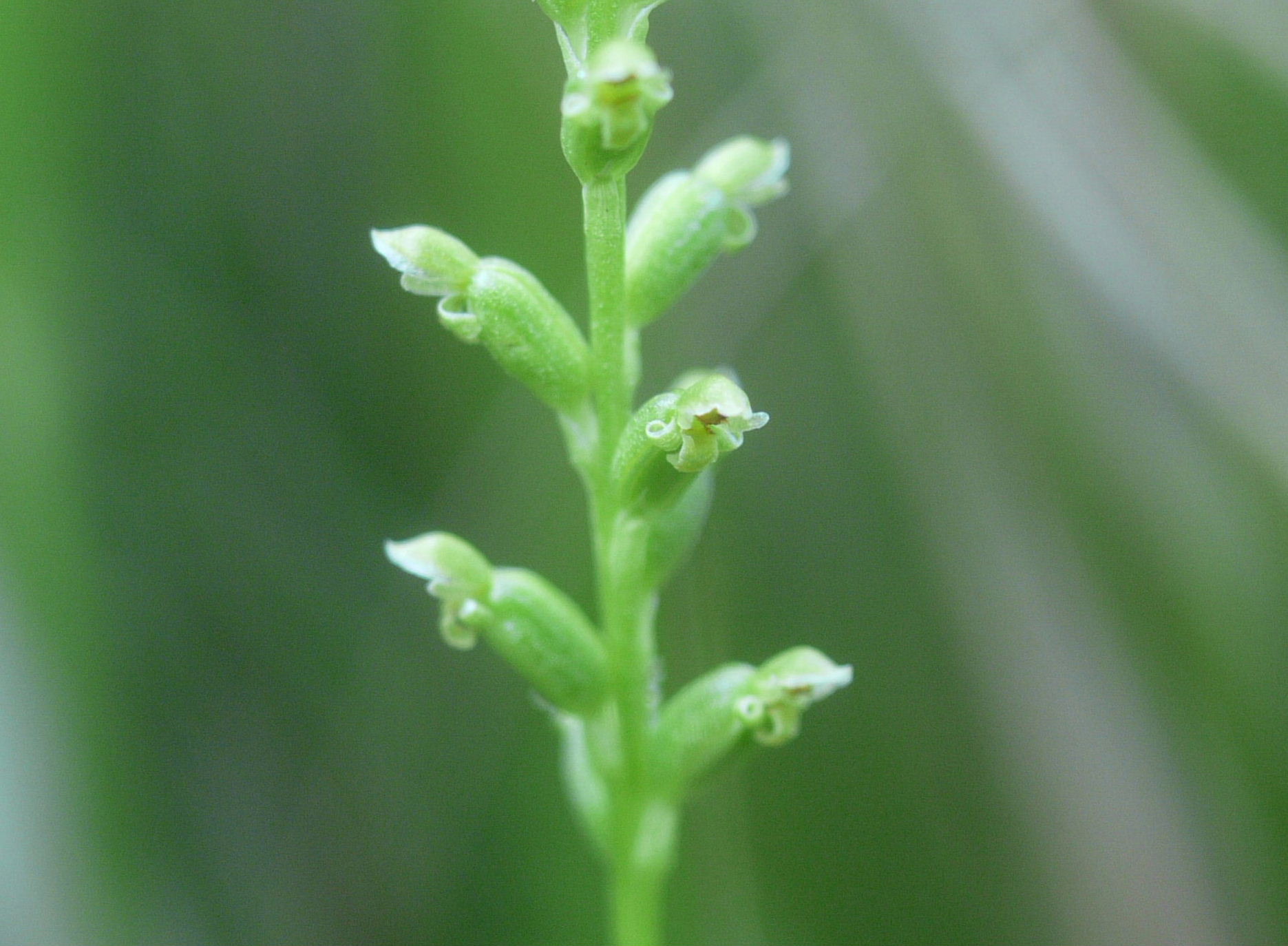
Microtis unifolia, Tanabe, Wakayama, Japan

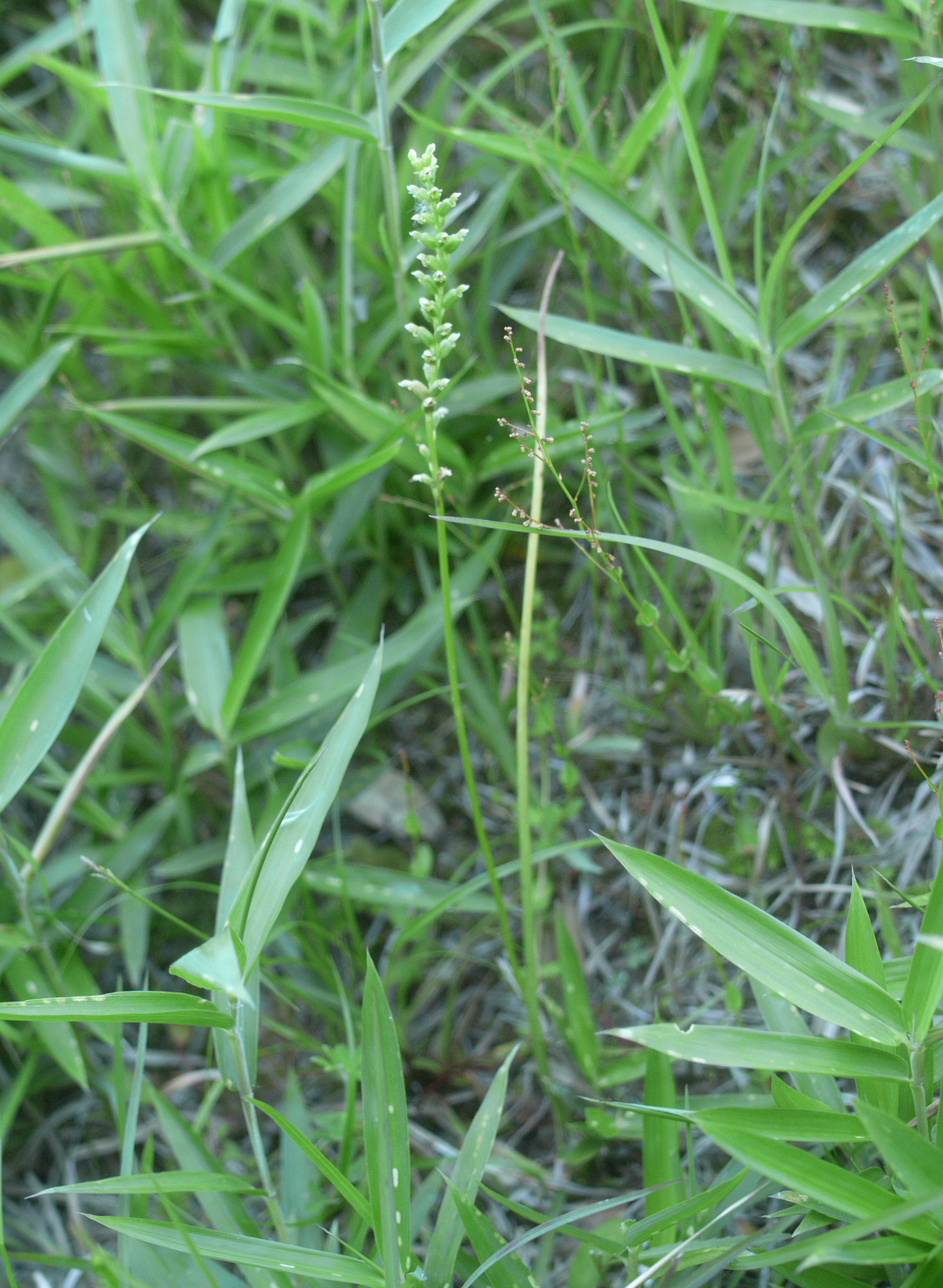
M. unifolia known as Nirabaran in Japan
