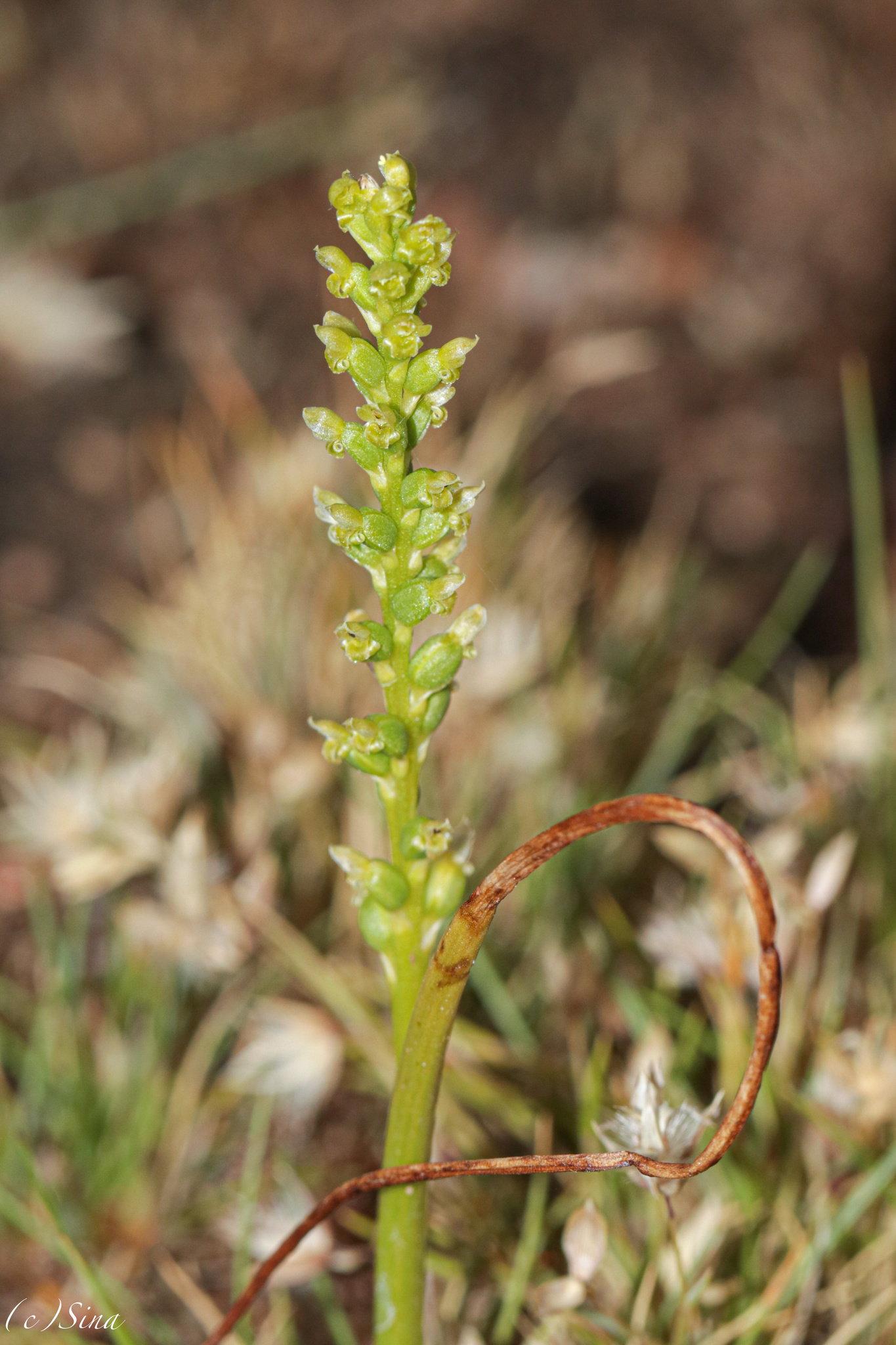

Scientific classification
- Kingdom: Plantae
- Clade: Tracheophytes
- Clade: Angiosperms
- Clade: Monocots
- Order: Asparagales
- Family: Orchidaceae
- Subfamily: Orchidoideae
- Tribe: Diurideae
- Genus: Microtis
- Species: M. eremaea

Binomial name
- Microtis eremaea R.J.Bates

= Microtis eremaea =

Slender mignonette orchid

Species of orchid

Microtis eremaea, commonly known as the slender mignonette orchid or inland onion orchid is a species of orchid endemic to the south-west of continental Australia. It has a single thin, hollow, onion-like leaf and up to fifty small greenish-yellow flowers. The flowers have a distinctive heart-shaped labellum and the orchid generally grows in more inland areas than most other onion orchids.

== Description ==
Microtis eremaea is a terrestrial, perennial, deciduous, herb with an underground tuber and a single erect, smooth, tubular leaf 300–450 mm (10–20 in) long and 3–8 mm (0.1–0.3 in) wide. Between ten and fifty yellowish-green flowers are crowded along a flowering stem 300–400 mm (10–20 in) tall. The flowers are 2–2.5 mm (0.08–0.1 in) long, 1.5–2 mm (0.06–0.08 in) wide with an ovary 3–4 mm (0.1–0.2 in) long. The dorsal sepal is 2–2.5 mm (0.08–0.1 in) long, about 1 mm (0.04 in) wide and hood-like. The lateral sepals are about 2 mm (0.08 in) long, 1 mm (0.04 in) wide with their tips rolled downwards. The petals are 1.5 mm (0.06 in) long, 1 mm (0.04 in) wide and are partly enclosed by the dorsal sepal. The labellum is heart-shaped, 1.5–2 mm (0.06–0.08 in) long, about 1 mm (0.04 in) wide and curves downwards with slightly wavy edges. Flowering occurs from August to October.

== Taxonomy and naming ==
Microtis eremaea was first formally described in 1996 by Robert Bates from a specimen collected on a granite outcrop west of Mount Magnet and the description was published in Journal of the Adelaide Botanic Garden. The specific epithet (eremaea) is derived from Latin eremaea, referring to the arid habitat of this orchid.

== Distribution and habitat ==
Microtis eremaea mostly grows on granite outcrops or near temporary watercourses, sometimes forming dense colonies. It is found between Balladonia and Cue in Western Australia and in the west of South Australia.

== Conservation ==
Microtis eremaea is classified as "not threatened" by the Western Australian Government Department of Parks and Wildlife.
