= Microtis atrata =

Swamp mignonette orchid

Scientific classification
- Kingdom: Plantae
- Clade: Tracheophytes
- Clade: Angiosperms
- Clade: Monocots
- Order: Asparagales
- Family: Orchidaceae
- Subfamily: Orchidoideae
- Tribe: Diurideae
- Genus: Microtis
- Species: M. atrata

Binomial name
- Microtis atrata Lindl.

Synonyms
- Microtidium atratum (Lindl.) D.L.Jones & M.A.Clem.

Species of orchid

Microtis atrata, commonly known as the swamp mignonette orchid or yellow onion orchid and sometimes as Microtidium atratum, is a species of orchid endemic to southern Australia. It has a single thin leaf and up to forty or more yellowish-green flowers. The flowers are the smallest of any Australian ground-dwelling orchid. The orchid usually grows in large colonies after fire and although small, are easily seen because of their very large numbers in their blackened surroundings.

== Description ==
Microtis atrata is a terrestrial, perennial, deciduous, herb with an underground tuber and a single erect, smooth, more or less solid leaf, 30–90 mm (1–4 in) long and about 3 mm (0.1 in) wide. Between two and forty or more yellowish-green flowers are densely crowded along a flowering stem 10–40 mm (0.4–2 in) long, reaching to a height of 50–120 mm (2–5 in). The plants are sometimes up to 200 mm (8 in) tall if growing in water. At about 2 mm (0.08 in) long and wide, the flowers are the smallest of any terrestrial Australian orchid, and as they age, they turn black. The dorsal sepal is egg-shaped to round, about 1 mm (0.04 in) long and wide and forms a hood over the column. The lateral sepals are oblong, less than 1 mm (0.04 in) long and spread apart from each other. The petals are egg-shaped and concave and the labellum is oblong to egg-shaped. Flowering occurs from September to December and is stimulated by fire the previous summer.

== Taxonomy and naming ==
Microtis atrata was first formally described in 1840 by John Lindley and the description was published in A Sketch of the Vegetation of the Swan River Colony. The specific epithet (atrata) is a Latin word meaning "dressed in black", referring to the colour of the dried flowers.

Some authorities give this species the name Microtidium atratum but this name is not widely accepted.

== Distribution and habitat ==
The swamp mignonette orchid occurs in the south-west of Western Australia, the south-east of South Australia, in southern Victoria and northern Tasmania. It grows in swampy places and in winter-wet depressions, sometimes in standing water and can form colonies of enormous numbers of plants after summer fire.

== Conservation ==
Microtis atrata is classified as "not threatened" in Western Australia by the Western Australian Government Department of Parks and Wildlife, but is regarded as "endangered" in South Australia and as "rare" in Tasmania.
