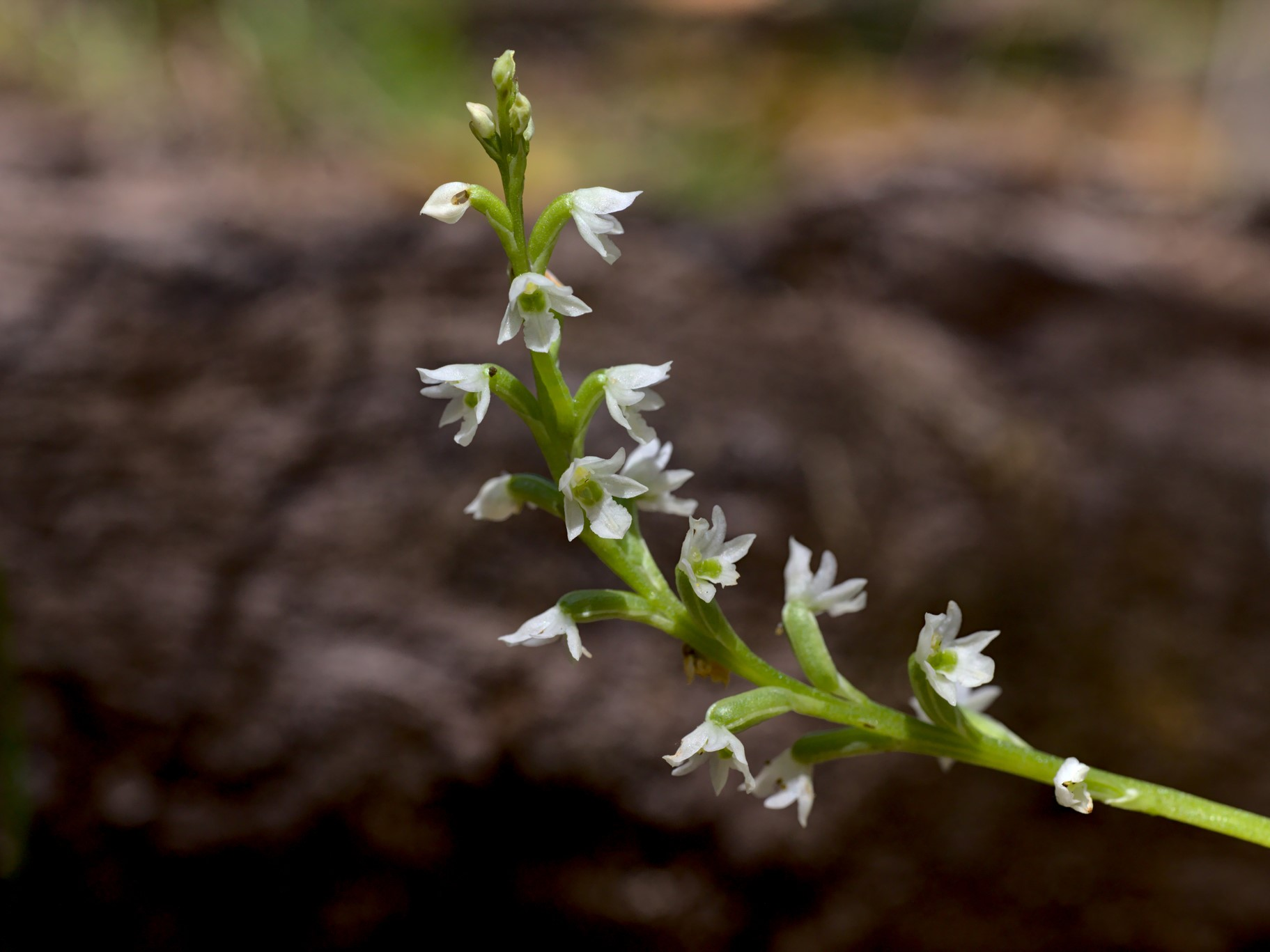

Conservation status
- Priority Four — Rare Taxa (DEC)

Scientific classification
- Kingdom: Plantae
- Clade: Tracheophytes
- Clade: Angiosperms
- Clade: Monocots
- Order: Asparagales
- Family: Orchidaceae
- Subfamily: Orchidoideae
- Tribe: Diurideae
- Genus: Microtis
- Species: M. pulchella

Binomial name
- Microtis pulchella R.Br.

Synonyms
- Microtis gymnadenioides Diels

= Microtis pulchella =

Beautiful mignonette orchid

Species of orchid

Microtis pulchella, commonly known as the beautiful mignonette orchid or beautiful onion orchid, is a species of orchid endemic to the south-west of Western Australia. It has a single hollow, onion-like leaf and up to twenty five white, thinly textured flowers with a slight perfume. It only flowers after fire and only sometimes produces short, thread-like leaves in the absence of fire.

== Description ==
Microtis pulchella is a terrestrial, perennial, deciduous, herb with an underground tuber and a single erect, smooth, tubular leaf 60–250 mm (2–10 in) long and 3–8 mm (0.1–0.3 in) wide. Between five and twenty five thinly textured, white flowers are arranged along a flowering stem 70–140 mm (3–6 in) long, reaching to a height of 150–300 mm (6–10 in). The flowers are lightly perfumed, 4–5 mm (0.16–0.20 in) long and wide and droop as they age. The dorsal sepal is egg-shaped, 2.5–3 mm (0.098–0.12 in) long, about 2 mm (0.08 in) wide and flat or slightly concave. The lateral sepals are lance-shaped to egg-shaped, 2–2.5 mm (0.08–0.1 in) long, about 1 mm (0.04 in) wide and spread apart. The petals are lance-shaped, about 2 mm (0.08 in) long, 1 mm (0.04 in) wide and curved. The labellum is more or less oval, 3–3.5 mm (0.12–0.14 in) long, 1–1.5 mm (0.04–0.06 in) wide with slightly wavy or toothed edges. There are two raised, dark green calli in the centre of the labellum. Flowering occurs from November to January but only after fire the previous summer. Non-flowering plants sometimes produce a thread-like leaf 10–20 mm (0.4–0.8 in) long.

== Taxonomy and naming ==
Microtis pulchella was first formally described in 1810 by Robert Brown and the description was published in Prodromus Florae Novae Hollandiae et Insulae Van Diemen. The specific epithet (pulchella) is a Latin word meaning "beautiful", referring to the flowers of this orchid.

== Distribution and habitat ==
The beautiful mignonette orchid grows in peaty swamps, often forming large colonies between Albany and Augusta.

== Conservation ==
Microtis alba is classified as "Priority Four" by the Government of Western Australia Department of Parks and Wildlife, meaning that is rare or near threatened.
