= Microtis rara =

Scented onion orchid

Scientific classification
- Kingdom: Plantae
- Clade: Tracheophytes
- Clade: Angiosperms
- Clade: Monocots
- Order: Asparagales
- Family: Orchidaceae
- Subfamily: Orchidoideae
- Tribe: Diurideae
- Genus: Microtis
- Species: M. rara

Binomial name
- Microtis rara R.Br.

Synonyms
- Microtis unifolia var. rara (R.Br.) Rchb.f.

Species of orchid

Microtis rara, commonly known as the scented onion orchid, is a species of orchid endemic to Australia, with the exception of the Northern Territory. It has a single hollow, onion-like leaf and up to fifty small green or yellowish-green, scented flowers. It is similar to Microtis oblonga and some authorities regard the two as being one species.

== Description ==
Microtis rara is a terrestrial, perennial, deciduous, herb with an underground tuber and a single erect, tapering, tubular leaf 200–500 mm (8–20 in) long and 3–5 mm (0.1–0.2 in) wide. Between ten and fifty green or greenish-yellow flowers are well spaced along a flowering stem 30–160 mm (1–6 in) tall. The flowers sweetly scented, 5–6 mm (0.20–0.24 in) long and 2–2.5 mm (0.08–0.1 in) wide. The dorsal sepal is egg-shaped, 3–4 mm (0.1–0.2 in) long, 1.5–2 mm (0.06–0.08 in) wide with a dished lower surface. The lateral sepals are linear to oblong, 2–3 mm (0.08–0.1 in) long, about 1 mm (0.04 in) wide with their tips rolled under. The petals are a curved lance shape, 2–2.5 mm (0.08–0.1 in) long, about 1 mm (0.04 in) wide and spread widely apart. The labellum is more or less oblong, 3–4 mm (0.1–0.2 in) long, 1–1.5 mm (0.04–0.06 in) wide with notched edges and a narrowed middle section. There are dark green calli in the centre of the labellum. Flowering occurs from November to January and is stimulated by fire the previous summer.

== Taxonomy and naming ==
Microtis rara was first formally described in 1810 by Robert Brown and the description was published in Prodromus Florae Novae Hollandiae et Insulae Van Diemen. The specific epithet (rara) is a Latin word meaning "scarce", "scattered" or "dispersed".

Some authorities regard Microtis oblonga as being a race of M. rara.

== Distribution and habitat ==
The scented onion orchid grows swamps and wet forests and is widespread but not common, occurring in all states but not the Northern Territory.
