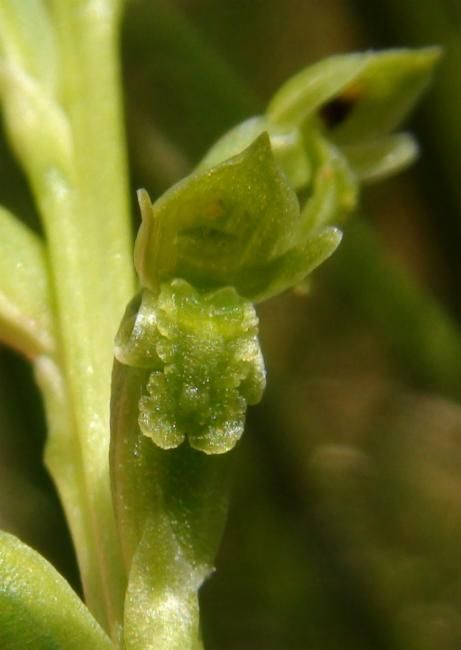

Scientific classification
- Kingdom: Plantae
- Clade: Tracheophytes
- Clade: Angiosperms
- Clade: Monocots
- Order: Asparagales
- Family: Orchidaceae
- Subfamily: Orchidoideae
- Tribe: Diurideae
- Genus: Microtis
- Species: M. oblonga

Binomial name
- Microtis oblonga R.S.Rogers

= Microtis oblonga =

Sweet onion orchid

Species of orchid

Microtis oblonga, commonly known as the sweet onion orchid, is a species of orchid endemic to south-eastern Australia. It has a single hollow, onion-like leaf and up to fifty scented, bright green flowers. It is considered by some Australian authorities to be synonymous with Microtis rara.

== Description ==
Microtis oblonga is a terrestrial, perennial, deciduous, herb with an underground tuber and a single erect, smooth, tubular leaf 200–600 mm (8–20 in) long and 6–8 mm (0.2–0.3 in) wide. Between ten and fifty bright green, sweetly scented flowers are arranged along a flowering stem 400–900 mm (20–40 in) tall. The flowers are 5–6 mm (0.20–0.24 in) long and 2–3 mm (0.08–0.1 in) wide. The dorsal sepal is more or less erect, about 3 mm (0.1 in) long and wide. The lateral sepals are 3 mm (0.1 in) long, about 1 mm (0.04 in) wide with their tips rolled under. The petals are 2–2.5 mm (0.08–0.1 in) long, about 1 mm (0.04 in) wide and usually curve forwards. The labellum is oblong, 3–3.5 mm (0.12–0.14 in) long, 1.5–2 mm (0.06–0.08 in) wide with irregular edges and turns downward towards the ovary. There is a raised, dark green callus in the centre of the labellum. Flowering occurs from October to February.

== Taxonomy and naming ==
Microtis oblonga was first formally described in 1923 by Richard Sanders Rogers and the description was published in Transactions and Proceedings of the Royal Society of South Australia. It is regarded by many Australian authorities as being a synonym of Microtis rara. The specific epithet (oblonga) is a Latin word meaning "longer than broad".

== Distribution and habitat ==
The sweet onion orchid grows between grasses and shrubs in open forest from Gympie in Queensland south through New South Wales, Victoria and Tasmania and west to south-eastern South Australia.
