= Microtis familiaris =

Coastal mignonette orchid

Scientific classification
- Kingdom: Plantae
- Clade: Tracheophytes
- Clade: Angiosperms
- Clade: Monocots
- Order: Asparagales
- Family: Orchidaceae
- Subfamily: Orchidoideae
- Tribe: Diurideae
- Genus: Microtis
- Species: M. familiaris

Binomial name
- Microtis familiaris R.J.Bates

Species of orchid

Microtis familiaris, commonly known as coastal mignonette orchid or coastal onion orchid is a species of orchid endemic to the south-west coastal region of Western Australia. It has a single hollow, onion-like leaf and up to twenty small, green to greenish-yellow, sweetly scented, widely spaced flowers. It often grows with large populations of other Microtis orchids but only flowers after fire.

== Description ==
Microtis familiaris is a terrestrial, perennial, deciduous, herb with an underground tuber and a single erect, smooth, tubular leaf 80–200 mm (3–8 in) long and 2–3 mm (0.08–0.1 in) wide. Between ten and twenty green to greenish-yellow flowers are well spaced along a flowering stem 100–250 mm (4–10 in) tall. The flowers are 2–2.5 mm (0.08–0.1 in) long, about 1 mm (0.04 in) wide and are sweetly scented. The dorsal sepal is egg-shaped with a small point on the tip and is 2–2.5 mm (0.08–0.1 in) long, 1.5–2 mm (0.06–0.08 in) wide and hood-like. The lateral sepals are lance-shaped, 2–2.5 mm (0.08–0.1 in) long, about 1 mm (0.04 in) wide and turn back with their tips clasping the ovary. The petals are about 1.5 mm (0.06 in) long, 0.5 mm (0.02 in) wide and are partly enclosed by the dorsal sepal. The labellum is oblong, 2–2.5 mm (0.08–0.1 in) long, about 1 mm (0.04 in) wide and parallel to the ovary with a saddle-shaped callus in its centre. Flowering occurs from December to January but only after fire the previous summer.

== Taxonomy and naming ==
Microtis familiaris was first formally described in 1990 by Robert John Bates from a specimen collected at Boat Harbour near Denmark and the description was published in Journal of the Adelaide Botanic Gardens. The specific epithet (familiaris) is a Latin word meaning "of a family or household" or "domestic", referring to the observation that this orchid often grows with other Microtis species.

== Distribution and habitat ==
Coastal mignonette orchid grows in swampy heath in coastal areas between Augusta and Esperance in the Esperance Plains, Jarrah Forest and Warren biogeographic regions.

== Conservation ==
Microtis familiaris is classified as "not threatened" by the Western Australian Government Department of Parks and Wildlife.
