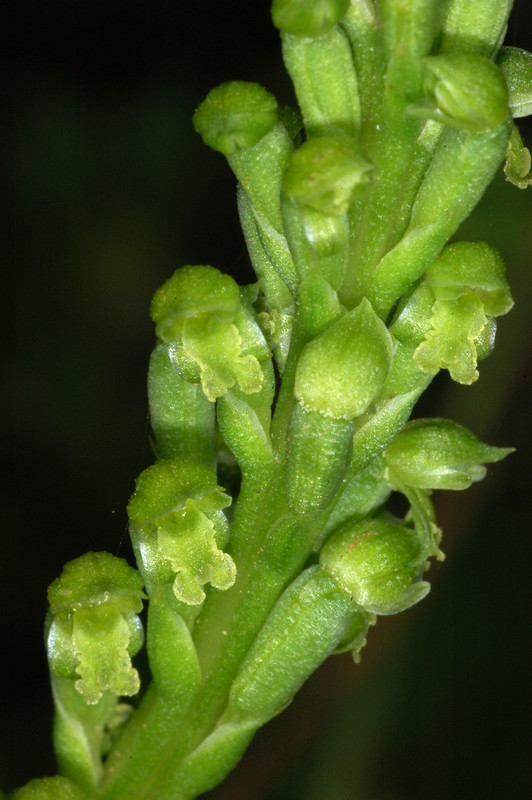
- In Mount Remarkable National Park

Scientific classification
- Kingdom: Plantae
- Clade: Tracheophytes
- Clade: Angiosperms
- Clade: Monocots
- Order: Asparagales
- Family: Orchidaceae
- Subfamily: Orchidoideae
- Tribe: Diurideae
- Genus: Microtis
- Species: M. arenaria

Binomial name
- Microtis arenaria Lindl.

Synonyms
- Microtis biloba Nicholls; Microtis pulchella var. vivax Lindl.; Microtis unifolia auct. non (G.Forst.) Rchb.f.

= Microtis arenaria =

Species of orchid

Microtis arenaria, commonly known as the notched onion orchid or pale onion orchid, is a species of orchid native to south-eastern Australia and New Zealand. It has a single hollow, onion-like leaf and up to sixty scented, crowded yellowish-green flowers. It is widespread and common, growing in a wide variety of habitats.

== Description ==
Microtis arenaria is a terrestrial, perennial, deciduous, herb with an underground tuber and a single erect, smooth, tubular leaf 300–800 mm (10–30 in) long and 6–7 mm (0.2–0.3 in) wide. Between ten and sixty yellowish-green, fragrant flowers are crowded along a flowering stem 350–600 mm (10–20 in) tall. The flowers are 3–3.5 mm (0.12–0.14 in) long and 2–2.5 mm (0.08–0.1 in) wide. The dorsal sepal is egg-shaped, 2.5 mm (0.1 in) long and wide with its tip turned slightly upwards. The lateral sepals are 2.5 mm (0.1 in) long, about 1 mm (0.04 in) wide with their tips rolled under. The petals are lance-shaped but curved, about 2 mm (0.08 in) long, 1 mm (0.04 in) wide and are held under the dorsal sepal. The labellum curves downwards and is 2–2.5 mm (0.08–0.1 in) long, about 1.3 mm (0.05 in) wide with scalloped edges and a shallow notch at the tip between two prominent lobes. There is an irregularly-shaped callus in the centre of the labellum. Flowering occurs from September to January.

== Taxonomy and naming ==
Microtis arenaria was first formally described in 1840 by John Lindley and the description was published in The Genera and Species of Orchidaceous Plants. The specific epithet (arenaria) is a Latin word meaning "sandy".

== Distribution and habitat ==
The pale onion orchid is widespread and common in south-eastern New South Wales, throughout Victoria, Tasmania and south-eastern South Australia. It grows in a range of habitats from sandhills to rocky inland outcrops but is most common in coastal sand. Microtis arenaria also occurs on the North Island of New Zealand.
