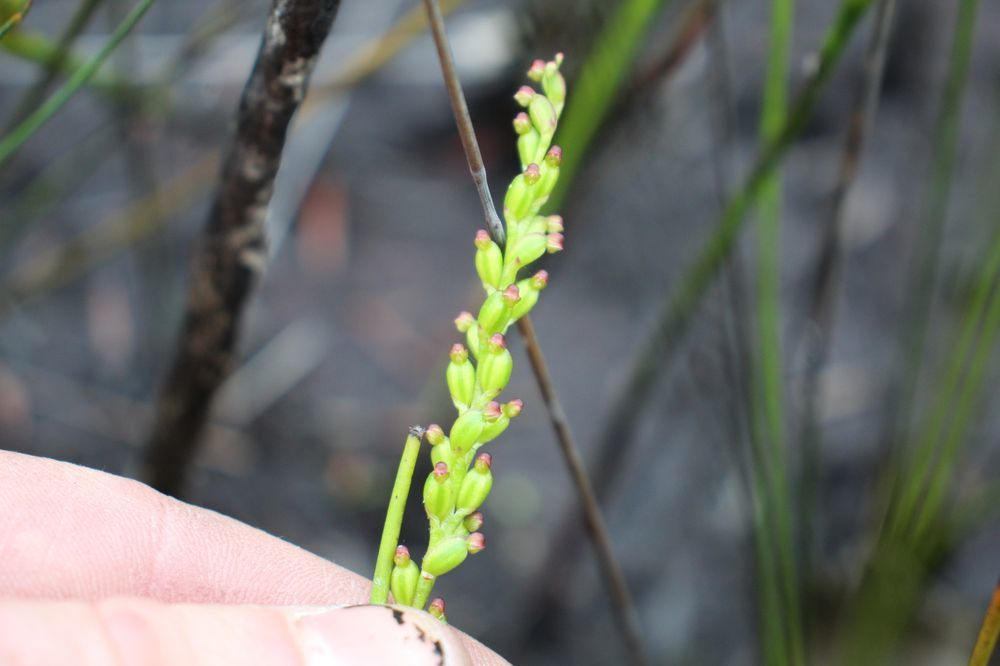
- In Mount Lindesay National Park

Scientific classification
- Kingdom: Plantae
- Clade: Tracheophytes
- Clade: Angiosperms
- Clade: Monocots
- Order: Asparagales
- Family: Orchidaceae
- Subfamily: Orchidoideae
- Tribe: Diurideae
- Genus: Microtis
- Species: M. cupularis

Binomial name
- Microtis cupularis (D.L.Jones & G.Brockman) A.P.Br.

Synonyms
- Hydrorchis cupularis D.L.Jones & G.Brockman; Microtis orbicularis subsp. cupped labellum (G.Brockman 684)

= Microtis cupularis =

Cupped mignonette orchid

Species of orchid

Microtis cupularis, commonly known as the cupped mignonette orchid sometimes as Hydrorchis cupularis, is a species of orchid endemic to the south-west of Western Australia. It has a single thin, hollow, onion-like leaf and up to thirty small, yellowish-green and red flowers. The plants often grow in shallow water and are self-pollinating.

== Description ==
Microtis cupularis is a terrestrial, perennial, deciduous, herb with an underground tuber and a single erect, smooth, tubular leaf 100–300 mm (4–10 in) long and about 3 mm (0.1 in) wide. Between fifteen and thirty yellowish-green and reddish-maroon flowers are arranged along a flowering stem 150–350 mm (6–10 in) tall. The flowers are about 4 mm (0.2 in) long, 3 mm (0.1 in) wide and are self-pollinating. The dorsal sepal is about 1.5 mm (0.06 in) long and wide. The lateral sepals are about 1.5 mm (0.06 in) long and curve around the labellum. The petals are a similar size to the lateral sepals and are partly enclosed by the labellum. The labellum is cup-shaped, fleshy and about 1.5 mm (0.06 in) long and wide. Flowering occurs from September to December.

== Taxonomy and naming ==
The cupped mignonette orchid was first formally described in 2005 by D.L.Jones and Garry Brockman from a specimen collected near Bull Creek and given the name Hydrorchis cupularis. The description was published in The Orchadian. In 2007, Andrew Brown changed the name to Microtis cupularis. The specific epithet (cupularis) is derived from the Latin word cupula meaning "cup", referring to the cup-shaped labellum.

== Distribution and habitat ==
Microtis cupularis grows in seasonally wet depressions and where water runs of granite outcrops, often growing in several centimetres of water. It is found between Perth and to just east of Esperance.

== Conservation ==
Microtis cupularis is classified as "not threatened" by the Western Australian Government Department of Parks and Wildlife.
