= Microtis alba =

White mignonette orchid

Scientific classification
- Kingdom: Plantae
- Clade: Tracheophytes
- Clade: Angiosperms
- Clade: Monocots
- Order: Asparagales
- Family: Orchidaceae
- Subfamily: Orchidoideae
- Tribe: Diurideae
- Genus: Microtis
- Species: M. alba

Binomial name
- Microtis alba R.Br.

Synonyms
- Goadbyella gracilis R.S.Rogers

Species of orchid

Microtis alba, commonly known as white mignonette orchid or slender onion-orchid, is a species of orchid endemic to the south-west of Western Australia. It has a single hollow, onion-like leaf and up to sixty small, green and white flowers with a strong musky fragrance. It is much more common after a fire the previous summer than in unburned country.

== Description ==
Microtis alba is a terrestrial, perennial, deciduous, herb with an underground tuber and a single erect, smooth, tubular leaf 100–500 mm (4–20 in) long and 7–10 mm (0.3–0.4 in) wide. Between ten and sixty green and white flowers are arranged along a flowering stem 200–800 mm (8–30 in) tall. The flowers have a strong musky fragrance, lean downwards and are 5–8 mm (0.2–0.3 in) long and 3–4 mm (0.1–0.2 in) wide. The dorsal sepal is 4–5 mm (0.16–0.20 in) long, about 2 mm (0.08 in) wide and forms a hood over the column. The lateral sepals are 3–4 mm (0.1–0.2 in) long, about 1 mm (0.04 in) wide with their tips rolled under. The petals are 3–4 mm (0.1–0.2 in) long, about 1 mm (0.04 in) wide and often curved. The labellum is oblong to wedge-shaped, 4–7 mm (0.2–0.3 in) long, 1–2 mm (0.04–0.08 in) wide with wrinkled edges and a notched tip. Flowering occurs from October to January but much more prolifically after fire the previous summer.

== Taxonomy and naming ==
Microtis alba was first formally described by Robert Brown in 1810 and the description was published in Prodromus Florae Novae Hollandiae et Insulae Van Diemen. The specific epithet (alba) is a Latin word meaning "white".

== Distribution and habitat ==
White mignonette orchid grows in a range of habitats from seasonally wet flats to forest and occurs between Dongara and Israelite Bay.

== Conservation ==
Microtis alba is classified as "not threatened" by the Western Australian Government Department of Parks and Wildlife.
