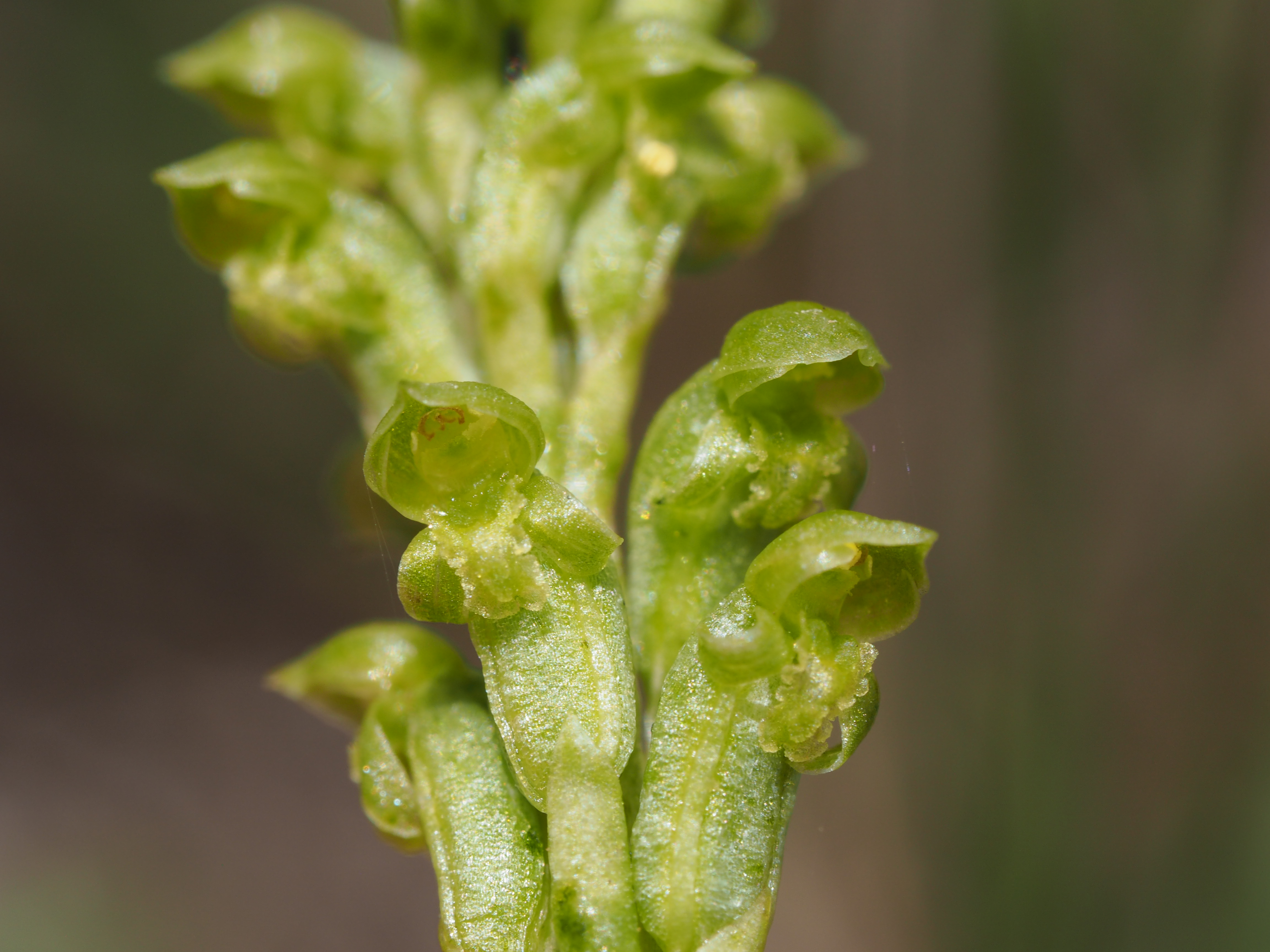
- Microtis unifolia growing near Guyra

Scientific classification
- Kingdom: Plantae
- Clade: Tracheophytes
- Clade: Angiosperms
- Clade: Monocots
- Order: Asparagales
- Family: Orchidaceae
- Subfamily: Orchidoideae
- Tribe: Diurideae
- Genus: Microtis
- Species: M. unifolia

Binomial name
- Microtis unifolia (G.Forst.) Rchb.f

Synonyms
- Ophrys unifolia G.Forst.; Epipactis porrifolia Sw.; Microtis parviflora R.Br.; Microtis porrifolia (Sw.) R.Br.; Microtis banksii A.Cunn.; Microtis pulchella Lindl., nom. illeg.; Microtis frutetorum Schltdl.; Microtis javanica Rchb.f.; Microtis viridis F.Muell., nom. illeg.; Microtis benthamiana Rchb.f.; Microtis papillosa Colenso; Microtis longifolia Colenso; Microtis porrifolia var. parviflora (R.Br.) Rodway; Microtis aemula Schltr.; Microtis bipulvinaris Nicholls; Microtis holmesii Nicholls; Microtis formosana Schltr. ex Masam.

= Microtis unifolia =

Common onion orchid

Species of orchid

Microtis unifolia, commonly known as the common onion orchid, is a species of orchid occurring from south China to Japan, Malesia, and Australasia to the Southwest Pacific. It has a single green leaf and up to one hundred small green or yellowish-green flowers. A common, widespread orchid which is easily grown in pots and is sometimes a weed in plant nurseries.

== Description ==
Microtis unifolia is a terrestrial, perennial, deciduous, herb with an underground tuber and a single hollow, green leaf which is 100–800 mm (4–30 in) long. A flowering stem up to 600 mm (20 in) high emerges from the leaf about one-third of its length from its base. Between ten and one hundred green or yellowish-green flowers are arranged on a 30–130 mm (1–5 in) length of the flowering stem. There is a lance-shaped to egg-shaped bract 2–4 mm (0.08–0.2 in) long and about 1.50 mm (0.06 in) wide at the base of each flower. The ovary is more or less oval in shape, 3–4 mm (0.1–0.2 in) long on a short, relatively thick pedicel and stands out from the stem. The dorsal sepal is egg-shaped to almost circular, 2–4 mm (0.08–0.2 in) long and 1–2 mm (0.04–0.08 in) wide and forms a hood over the other parts of the flower. The lateral sepals are lance-shaped to egg-shaped, about 2 mm (0.08 in) long and 1 mm (0.04 in) wide and spread apart from each other. The petals are lance-shaped or egg-shaped and curved, shorter than the dorsal sepal and partly hidden by it. The labellum is oblong, 1–2.5 mm (0.04–0.1 in) long and pressed against the ovary. Its edges are notched, wrinkled or wavy and there is a saddle-shaped labellum in its centre. Flowering occurs from October to January in Australia, but somewhat later in New Zealand

== Taxonomy and naming ==
The common onion orchid was first formally described in 1786 by Georg Forster, who gave it the name Ophrys unifolia and published the description in Florulae Insularum Australium Prodromus. In 1871, Heinrich Gustav Reichenbach changed the name to Microtis unifolia. The specific epithet (unifolia) is derived from the Latin word unus meaning "one" and the folium meaning “leaf”.

== Distribution and habitat ==
Microtis unifolia occurs in a wide range of habitats from swamps to rocky outcrops in semi-arid areas. It is common in disturbed areas such as pine plantations, and in New Zealand it grows in lawns in urban areas and even in mossy crevices in old buildings. It is a variable species and similarities with other Microtis species leads to confusion as to its range but it is recognised as occurring in New South Wales, Queensland, South Australia and Victoria as well as on both main islands and many of the smaller islands of New Zealand. Its range also extends to New Caledonia, Polynesia, the Philippines, Indonesia, Japan and China.
