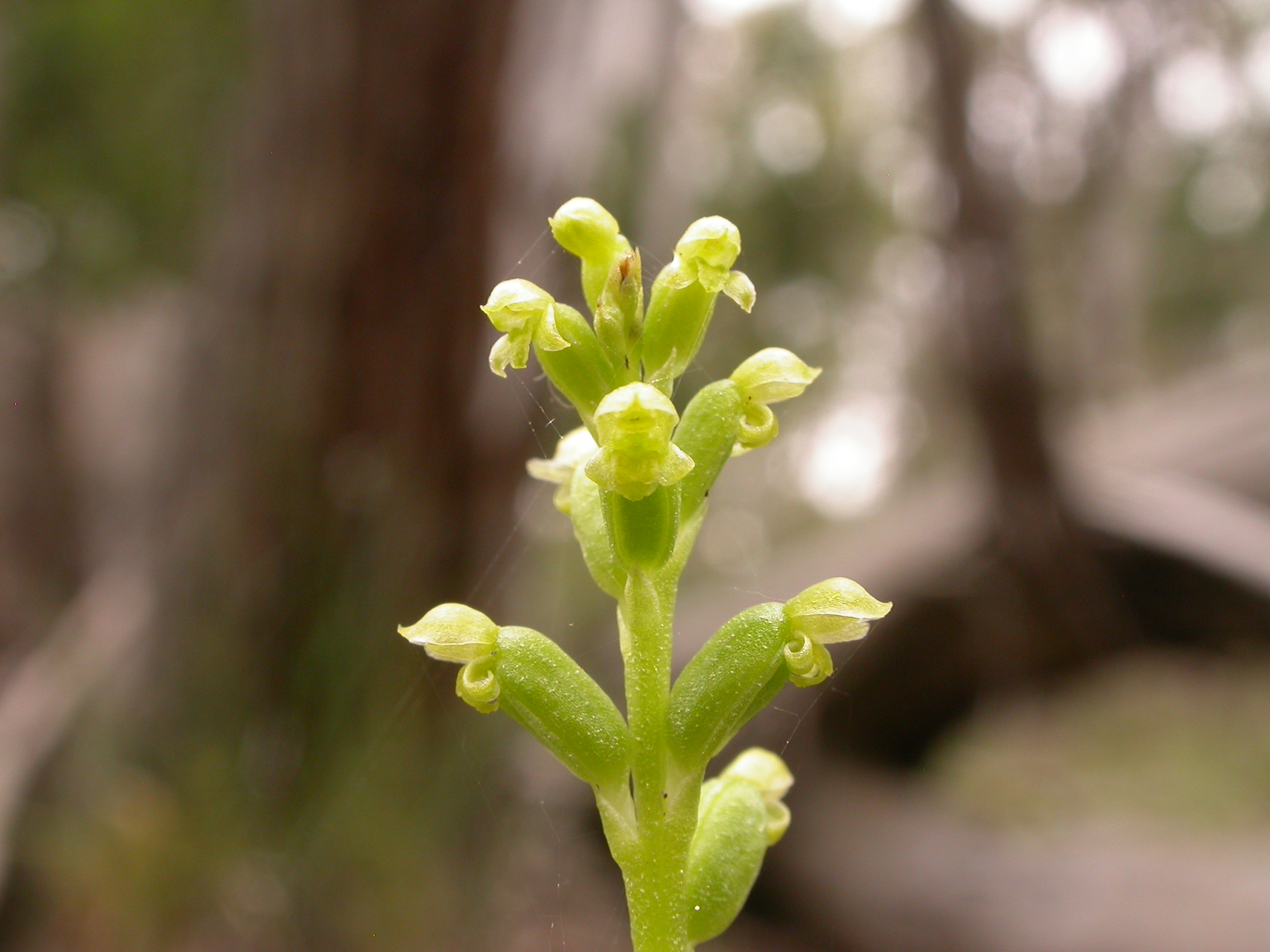
- Microtis parviflora growing on Black Mountain in the A.C.T.

Scientific classification
- Kingdom: Plantae
- Clade: Tracheophytes
- Clade: Angiosperms
- Clade: Monocots
- Order: Asparagales
- Family: Orchidaceae
- Subfamily: Orchidoideae
- Tribe: Diurideae
- Genus: Microtis
- Species: M. parviflora

Binomial name
- Microtis parviflora R.Br.

= Microtis parviflora =

Slender onion-orchid

Species of orchid

Microtis parviflora, commonly known as the slender onion-orchid, is a species of orchid which is native to Australia and New Zealand. It occurs in all states of Australia but is not known from the Northern Territory and may not occur in Western Australia. As with others in the genus, it has a single erect, smooth, tubular leaf and up to eighty flowers on an erect flower spike.

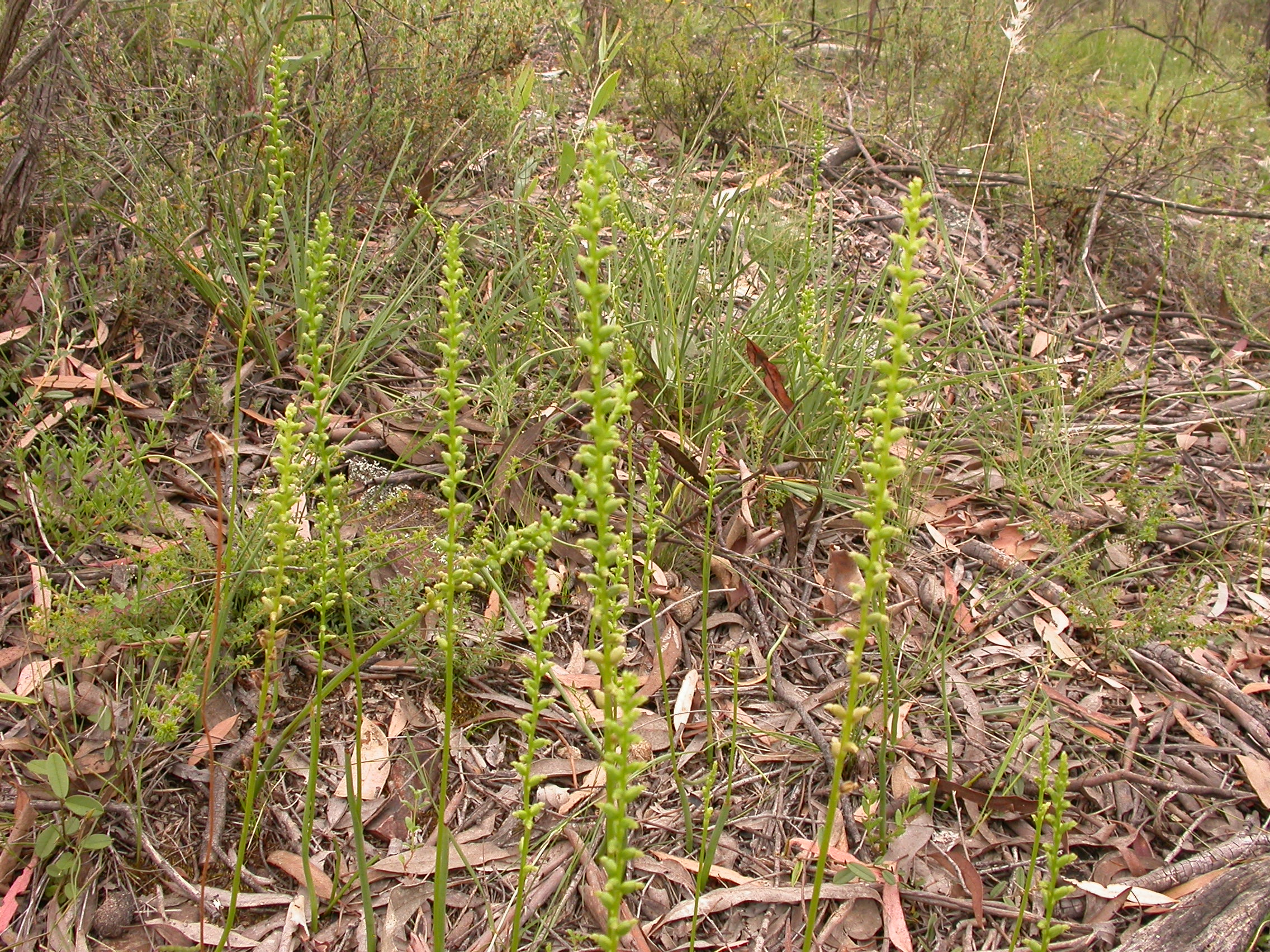
Microtis parviflora habit

== Description ==
Microtis parviflora is a terrestrial, perennial, deciduous, herb with an underground tuber and a single erect, smooth, tubular leaf 20–50 cm (8–20 in) long. The leaf is pointed at the end and usually longer than the flower spike. Between ten and eighty small green flowers are crowded on an erect, fleshy raceme 20–50 cm (8–20 in) tall. Each flower has a pedicel about 1 mm (0.04 in) long allowing the flower to stand out from the spike. The ovary is more or less oval in shape, 3–5 mm (0.1–0.2 in) long. The dorsal sepal is egg-shaped to round, about 2 mm (0.08 in) long and with the petals forms a hood over the column. The lateral sepals are linear in shape, slightly shorter than the dorsal sepal, and roll back as they age. The labellum is 1 or 2 mm (0.04 or 0.08 in) long, more or less heart-shaped and turns downwards in a semi-circle. There are two relatively large, egg-shaped calli at the base of the labellum. Flowering occurs from October to February, or to March in New Zealand.

== Taxonomy and naming ==
Microtis parviflora was first formally described by Robert Brown in 1810 and the description was published in Prodromus Florae Novae Hollandiae et Insulae Van Diemen. The specific epithet (parviflora) is derived from the Latin words parvus meaning "small" and flos meaning "flower".

== Distribution and habitat ==
The slender onion-orchid occurs in all the states of Australia but not the Northern Territory. There is some doubt about its presence in Western Australia, although several authors have noted its presence in semi-arid areas of that state.

In Australia, this species is common and widespread in many habitats, more usually in moist soils. It is found on the North and South Islands of New Zealand where it usually grows in places with little overhead vegetation.
