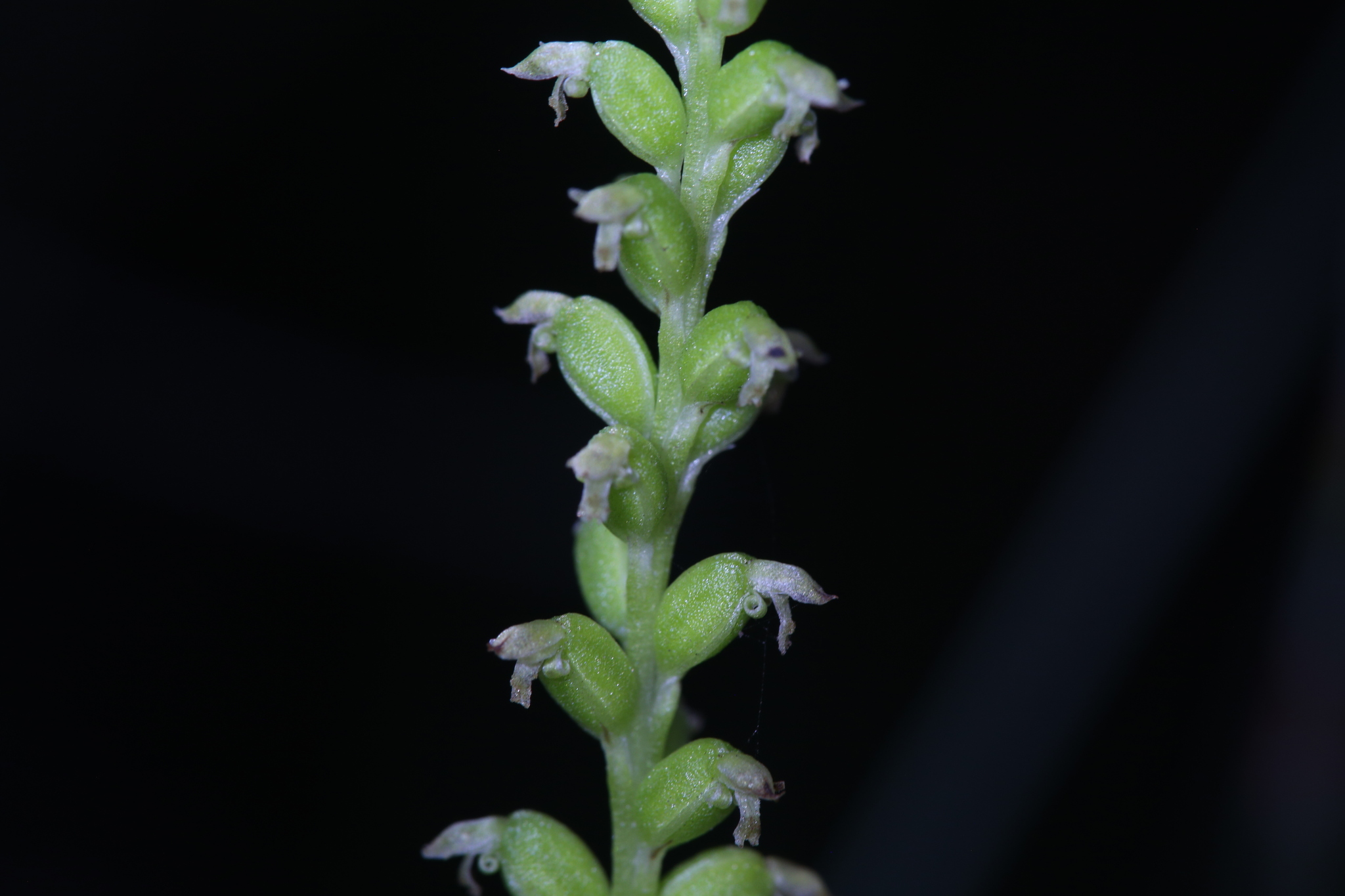

Conservation status
- Priority Four — Rare Taxa (DEC)

Scientific classification
- Kingdom: Plantae
- Clade: Tracheophytes
- Clade: Angiosperms
- Clade: Monocots
- Order: Asparagales
- Family: Orchidaceae
- Subfamily: Orchidoideae
- Tribe: Diurideae
- Genus: Microtis
- Species: M. quadrata

Binomial name
- Microtis quadrata (R.J.Bates) D.L.Jones & M.A.Clem.

= Microtis quadrata =

South coast mignonette orchid

Species of orchid

Microtis quadrata, commonly known as the south coast mignonette orchid or south coast onion orchid, is a species of orchid endemic to south-west coastal areas of Western Australia. It has a single thin, hollow, onion-like leaf and up to one hundred small, pale green flowers. This onion orchid grows on low mounds in swamps, often with other species of mignonette orchids, and flowers much more prolifically after fire.

== Description ==
Microtis quadrata is a terrestrial, perennial, deciduous, herb with an underground tuber and a single erect, smooth, tubular leaf 250–700 mm (10–30 in) long and 3–8 mm (0.1–0.3 in) wide. Between twenty and one hundred pale, yellowish-green flowers are crowded along a flowering stem 200–800 mm (8–30 in) tall. The flowers are 2.5–3.5 mm (0.098–0.14 in) long and 2.5–3 mm (0.098–0.12 in) wide. The dorsal sepal is 3–3.5 mm (0.12–0.14 in) long and 2.5 mm (0.1 in) wide and forms a hood over the rest of the flower. The lateral sepals are 2.5–3 mm (0.098–0.12 in) long, 1 mm (0.04 in) wide and curl downwards. The petals are about 2 mm (0.08 in) long, 1 mm (0.04 in) wide and are held under the dorsal sepal. The labellum is more or less rectangular in shape, about 2 mm (0.08 in) long and wide and turns downwards, almost touching the ovary. Flowering occurs from December to January, much more prolifically after fire the previous summer.

== Taxonomy and naming ==
The south coast mignonette orchid was first formally described in 1990 by Robert Bates from a specimen collected in a swamp near Nornalup. Bates gave it the name Microtis media subsp. quadrata and published the description in Journal of the Adelaide Botanic Gardens. In 2004, David Jones and Mark Clements changed the name to Microtis quadrata. The specific epithet (quadrata) is a Latin word meaning "four-cornered", referring to the shape of the labellum.

== Distribution and habitat ==
Microtis quadrata grows in seasonally wet depressions and in swampy mounds in near-coastal areas between Perth and Augusta. It is often found with other species of Microtis orchids.

== Conservation ==
Microtis quadrata is classified as "Priority Four" by the Government of Western Australia Department of Parks and Wildlife, meaning that is rare or near threatened.
