= Microtis eremicola =

Desert mignonette orchid

Scientific classification
- Kingdom: Plantae
- Clade: Tracheophytes
- Clade: Angiosperms
- Clade: Monocots
- Order: Asparagales
- Family: Orchidaceae
- Subfamily: Orchidoideae
- Tribe: Diurideae
- Genus: Microtis
- Species: M. eremicola

Binomial name
- Microtis eremicola (R.J.Bates) D.L.Jones & M.A.Clem.

Species of orchid

Microtis eremicola, commonly known as the desert mignonette orchid or dryland onion orchid, is a species of orchid endemic to the south-west of Western Australia. It has a single hollow, onion-like leaf and up to fifty small, dull green to greenish-yellow flowers. This onion orchid is common in soil pockets on granite outcrops in inland areas, mostly between Hyden and Balladonia.

== Description ==
Microtis eremicola is a terrestrial, perennial, deciduous, herb with an underground tuber and a single erect, smooth, tubular leaf 150–400 mm (6–20 in) long and 5–8 mm (0.2–0.3 in) wide. Between twenty and fifty dull green to yellowish-green flowers are crowded along a flowering stem 200–500 mm (8–20 in) tall. The flower lean downwards and are 3–4 mm (0.1–0.2 in) long and 2–3 mm (0.08–0.1 in) wide. The dorsal sepal is 2–2.5 mm (0.08–0.1 in) long and 2.5–3 mm (0.098–0.12 in) wide and forms a hood over the rest of the flower. The lateral sepals are 2.5–3 mm (0.098–0.12 in) long, 1 mm (0.04 in) wide and curl downwards. The petals are 1.5–2 mm (0.06–0.08 in) long, 1 mm (0.04 in) wide and are held under the dorsal sepal. The labellum is oblong, 3–3.5 mm (0.12–0.14 in) long, 1–2 mm (0.04–0.08 in) wide and turns downwards with thickened, irregular edges and a prominently cleft tip. Flowering occurs from September to November.

== Taxonomy and naming ==
The desert mignonette orchid was first formally described in 1990 by Robert Bates who gave it the name Microtis media subsp. eremicola and published the description in Journal of the Adelaide Botanic Gardens. In 2004, David Jones and Mark Clements changed the name to Microtis eremicola. The specific epithet (eremicola) is Latin for "dweller of dry places", referring to the arid habitat of this species.

== Distribution and habitat ==
Microtis eremicola is one of the most common Microtis orchids and grows in arid areas on granite outcrops, on the edges of salt lakes and along drainage lines between Geraldton and Israelite Bay but is most common between Hyden and Balladonia.

== Conservation ==
Microtis eremicola is classified as "not threatened" by the Government of Western Australia Department of Parks and Wildlife.
