= Acrotriche affinis =

Scientific classification
- Kingdom: Plantae
- Clade: Tracheophytes
- Clade: Angiosperms
- Clade: Eudicots
- Clade: Asterids
- Order: Ericales
- Family: Ericaceae
- Genus: Acrotriche
- Species: A. affinis

Binomial name
- Acrotriche affinis DC.
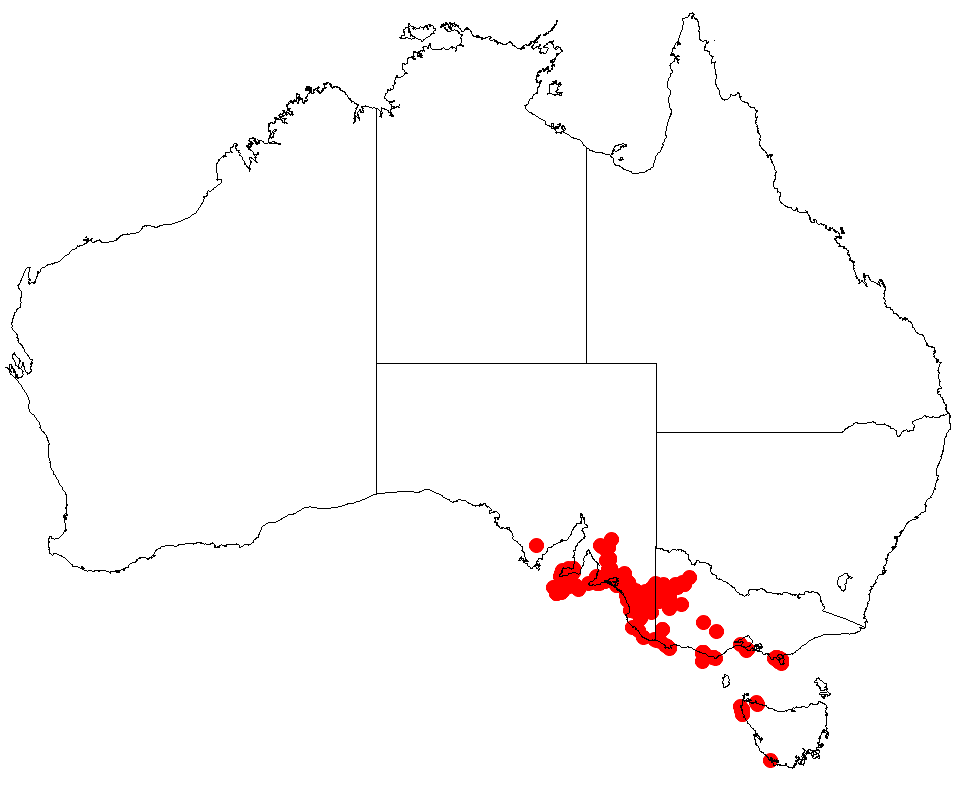
- Occurrence data from Australasian Virtual Herbarium

Species of plant

Acrotriche affinis, commonly known as ridged ground-berry or prickly honeypots, is a species of flowering plant in the family Ericaceae, and is endemic to south-eastern, continental Australia. It is an erect shrub with many branches, lance-shaped leaves, and spikes of tube-shaped, greenish flowers, and white, spherical drupes.

== Description ==
Acrotriche affinis is an erect, much-branched shrub that typically grows to a height of about 30 cm (12 in) and has softly-hairy branchlets. The leaves are broadly lance-shaped, 3–11 mm (0.12–0.43 in) long and 1.3–2.5 mm (0.051–0.098 in) wide with 5 to 9 more or less parallel veins separated by deep groves. The flowers are arranged in spikes of 4 to 10, about 2–7 mm (0.079–0.276 in) long, with bracteoles 1.0–1.6 mm (0.039–0.063 in) long at the base of the sepals. The sepals are 1.6–2.5 mm (0.063–0.098 in) long, and the petals are joined at the base to form a greenish tube, 2–4 mm (0.079–0.157 in), sometimes tinged with maroon, with lobes 1.5–2.0 mm (0.059–0.079 in) long. Flowering occurs from June to October and the fruit is a white, spherical drupe about 3–4 mm (0.12–0.16 in) in diameter.

== Taxonomy ==
Acrotriche affinis was first formally described in 1839 by Augustin Pyramus de Candolle in his Prodromus Systematis Naturalis Regni Vegetabilis. The specific epithet (affinis) means "neighbouring" or "akin to", referring to its similarity to A. serrulata.

== Distribution and habitat ==
Ridged ground-berry grows in coastal areas between the Eyre Peninsula in South Australia and Wilsons Promontory in Victoria, and inland as far as the Big Desert.
