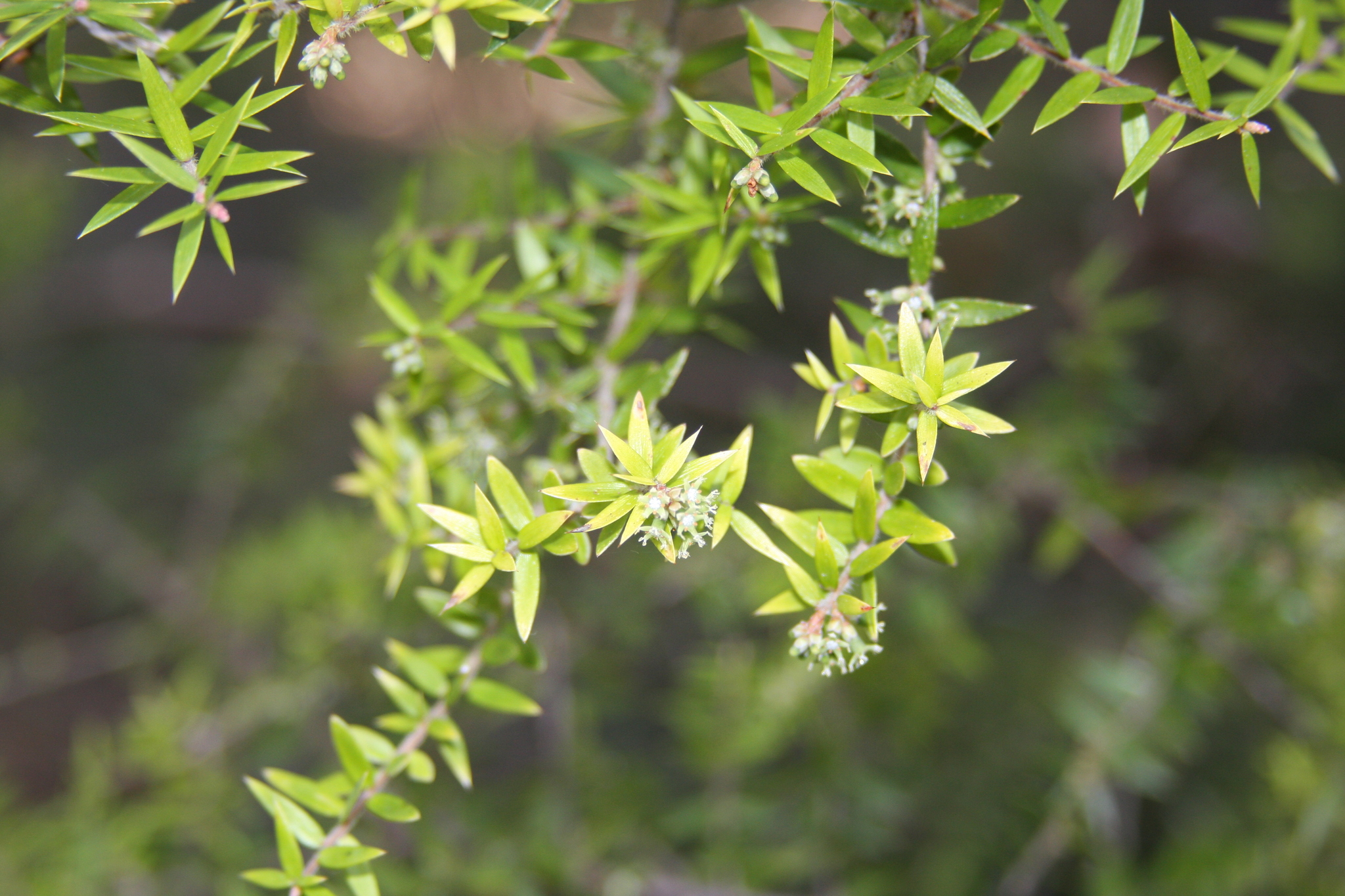
- Near Galston Gorge

Scientific classification
- Kingdom: Plantae
- Clade: Tracheophytes
- Clade: Angiosperms
- Clade: Eudicots
- Clade: Asterids
- Order: Ericales
- Family: Ericaceae
- Genus: Acrotriche
- Species: A. divaricata

Binomial name
- Acrotriche divaricata R.Br.
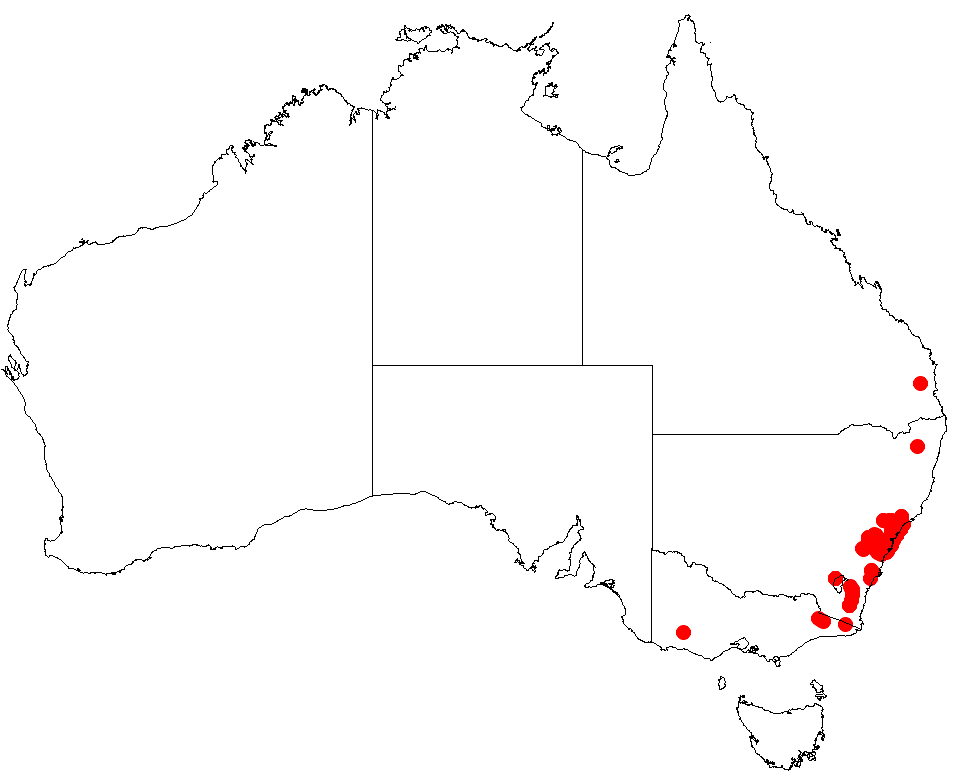
- Occurrence data from Australasian Virtual Herbarium

= Acrotriche divaricata =

Species of flowering plant

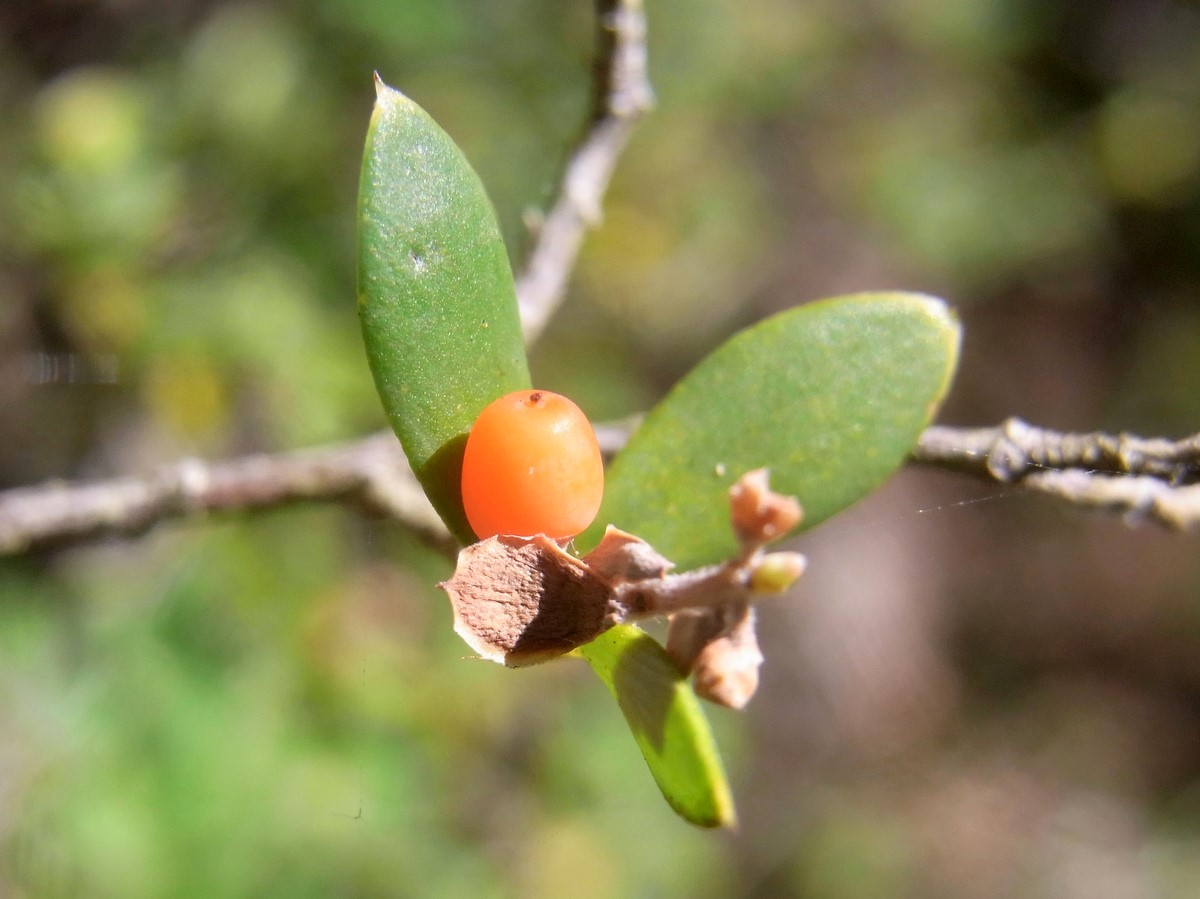
Fruit near Norah Head

Acrotriche divaricata is a species of flowering plant in the family Ericaceae and is endemic to New South Wales. It is a bushy shrub with sharply-pointed lance-shaped leaves and spikes of 3 to 5 green or cream-coloured flowers and spherical, red drupes.

== Description ==
Acrotriche divaricata is an erect, spreading, bushy shrub that typically grows to a height of 0.6–2 m (2 ft 0 in – 6 ft 7 in), its leaves at about 90° to the stem. The leaves are usually lance-shaped, sometimes oblong to elliptic, 6–16 mm (0.24–0.63 in) long, 1.7–4.2 mm (0.067–0.165 in) wide and sharply-pointed. The flowers are arranged in spikes with 3 to 5 green or cream-coloured flowers with bracteoles 0.5–0.9 mm (0.020–0.035 in) long at the base of the sepals. The sepals are 1.4–2.8 mm (0.055–0.110 in) long and the petals are joined at the base forming a tube 1.3–1.9 mm (0.051–0.075 in) long, the lobes 1.0–1.3 mm (0.039–0.051 in) long. Flowering mostly occurs between July and September and the fruit is a more or less spherical, fleshy, red drupe about 3 mm (0.12 in) in diameter.

== Taxonomy ==
Acrotriche divaricata was first formally described in 1810 by Robert Brown in his Prodromus Florae Novae Hollandiae et Insulae Van Diemen. The specific epithet (aggregata) means "widely spreading".

== Distribution and habitat ==
This species of Acrotriche is often found in sheltered forest or in rainforest, and is mostly seen growing on the coast and ranges of New South Wales south of Newcastle. A similar species Acrotriche leucocarpa with pearly white fruit, occurs in Victoria.
