= Styphelia retrorsa =

Scientific classification
- Kingdom: Plantae
- Clade: Tracheophytes
- Clade: Angiosperms
- Clade: Eudicots
- Clade: Asterids
- Order: Ericales
- Family: Ericaceae
- Genus: Styphelia
- Species: S. retrorsa

Binomial name
- Styphelia retrorsa Hislop & Puente-Lel.
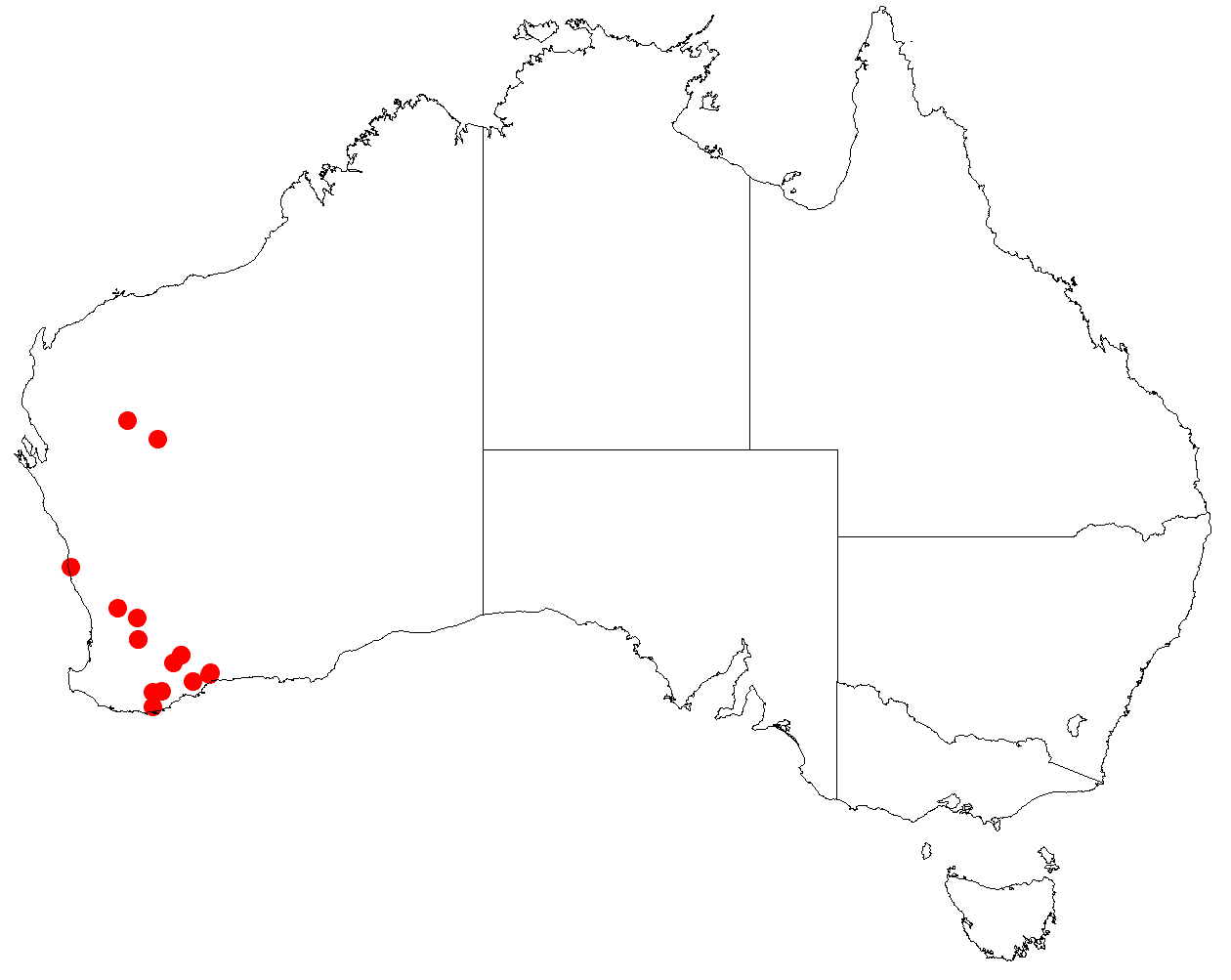
- Occurrence data from AVH

Synonyms
- Leucopogon ovalifolius Sond.; Styphelia oldfieldii F.Muell.

Species of plant

Styphelia retrorsa is a species of flowering plant in the heath family Ericaceae and is endemic to the south-west of Western Australia. It is an erect or straggling shrub that typically grows to a height of 1–2 ft (0.30–0.61 m). Its leaves are egg-shaped with the narrower end towards the base, 4.2–6.3 mm (0.17–0.25 in) long and sessile. The flowers are arranged in pairs or threes in leaf axils on a short peduncle with tiny bracts, and bracteoles less than half as long as the sepals. The sepals are about 2 mm (0.079 in) long, the petals 4.2–5.3 mm (0.17–0.21 in) long and joined at the base, the lobes longer than the petal tube.

The species was first formally described in 1845 by Otto Wilhelm Sonder in Lehmann's Plantae Preissianae from specimens collected in 1840. In 2020, Michael Hislop, Darren Crayn and Caroline Puente-Lelievre transferred the species to Styphelia as S. retrorsa in Australian Systematic Botany. The name S. ovalifolia was unavailable as it had already been given to Styphelia ovalifolia (R.Br.) Spreng., now known as Acrotriche cordata. The specific epithet (retrorsa) means "turned back".

Styphelia retrorsa occurs in the Avon Wheatbelt, Geraldton Sandplains, Jarrah Forest and Swan Coastal Plain bioregions of southern Western Australia and is listed as "not threatened" by the Western Australian Government Department of Biodiversity, Conservation and Attractions.
