= Acrotriche orbicularis =

Scientific classification
- Kingdom: Plantae
- Clade: Tracheophytes
- Clade: Angiosperms
- Clade: Eudicots
- Clade: Asterids
- Order: Ericales
- Family: Ericaceae
- Genus: Acrotriche
- Species: A. orbicularis

Binomial name
- Acrotriche orbicularis Hislop

Species of plant

Acrotriche orbicularis is a species of flowering plant in the family Ericaceae and is endemic to a restricted area near Ravensthorpe in the south-west of Western Australia. It is a compact, spreading shrub, with broadly egg-shaped or broadly elliptic leaves, and green, tube-shaped flowers.

== Description ==
Acrotriche orbicularis is a compact, spreading shrub that typically grows up to 60 cm (24 in) high and 80 cm (31 in) wide. Its leaves are usually broadly egg-shaped or broadly elliptic, 4.8–8.2 mm (0.19–0.32 in) long and 3.8–8.0 mm (0.15–0.31 in) wide on a petiole 0.8–1.3 mm (0.031–0.051 in) long. The flowers are arranged in groups of 3 to 7 in leaf axils with bracts and bracteoles 0.9–1.2 mm (0.035–0.047 in) long, the sepals egg-shaped, 1.3–1.5 mm (0.051–0.059 in) long. The petals are green and joined at the base forming a cylindrical tube 1.9–2.5 mm (0.075–0.098 in) and 0.9–1.0 mm (0.035–0.039 in) wide, with lobes much shorter than the tube, 0.6–0.9 mm (0.024–0.035 in) long and 0.5–0.6 mm (0.020–0.024 in) wide. Flowering has been observed in September.

== Taxonomy ==
Acrotriche orbicularis was first formally described in 2010 by Michael Clyde Hislop in the journal Telopea from specimens collected east of Ravensthorpe in 2008. The specific epithet (orbicularis) means 'orbicular', referring to the shape of the leaves.

== Distribution and habitat ==
This species is found in the understorey of low woodland on Bandalup Hill east of Ravensthorpe in the Esperance Plains bioregion of south-western Western Australia.

== Conservation status ==
This species is listed as "threatened" by the Government of Western Australia Department of Biodiversity, Conservation and Attractions, meaning that it is in danger of extinction.
