= Acrotriche lancifolia =

Scientific classification
- Kingdom: Plantae
- Clade: Tracheophytes
- Clade: Angiosperms
- Clade: Eudicots
- Clade: Asterids
- Order: Ericales
- Family: Ericaceae
- Genus: Acrotriche
- Species: A. lancifolia

Binomial name
- Acrotriche lancifolia Hislop

Species of plant

Acrotriche lancifolia is a species of flowering plant in the family Ericaceae and is endemic to the south-west of Western Australia. It is an erect, widely branching shrub, with usually narrowly egg-shaped, sharply-pointed leaves, green or yellowish-green, tube-shaped flowers, and flattened spherical drupes.

== Description ==
Acrotriche lancifolia is an erect, widely branched shrub that typically grows up to 1.5 m (4 ft 11 in) high and wide. The leaves are usually narrowly egg-shaped, sharply-pointed, 6–13 mm (0.24–0.51 in) long and 1.7–3.2 mm (0.067–0.126 in) wide on a petiole 1.0–1.6 mm (0.039–0.063 in) long. The flowers are arranged in groups of 4 to 9 in leaf axils with bracts and bracteoles 0.9–1.5 mm (0.035–0.059 in) long, the sepals 1.4–1.6 mm (0.055–0.063 in) long. The petals are green or greenish-yellow, and joined at the base forming a cylindrical tube 2.5–3.9 mm (0.098–0.154 in) and 1.1–1.5 mm (0.043–0.059 in) wide, with widely spreading lobes 1.0–1.3 mm (0.039–0.051 in) long and 0.7–0.9 mm (0.028–0.035 in) wide. Flowering mainly occurs from July to September, and the fruit is a spherical drupe 2.6–3.1 mm (0.10–0.12 in) long and 2.8–3.2 mm (0.11–0.13 in) wide.

== Taxonomy ==
Acrotriche lancifolia was first formally described in 2007 by Michael Clyde Hislop in the journal Telopea from specimens collected in the Parker Range in 2003. The specific epithet (lancifolia) means "lance-leaved".

== Distribution and habitat ==
This species grows on granite or laterite breakaways in shallow, rocky soil in open woodland and shrubland between Kondinin, Lake King and the Great Eastern Highway in the Avon Wheatbelt, Coolgardie and Mallee bioregions of south-western Western Australia.

== Conservation status ==
This species is listed as "not threatened" by the Government of Western Australia Department of Biodiversity, Conservation and Attractions.
