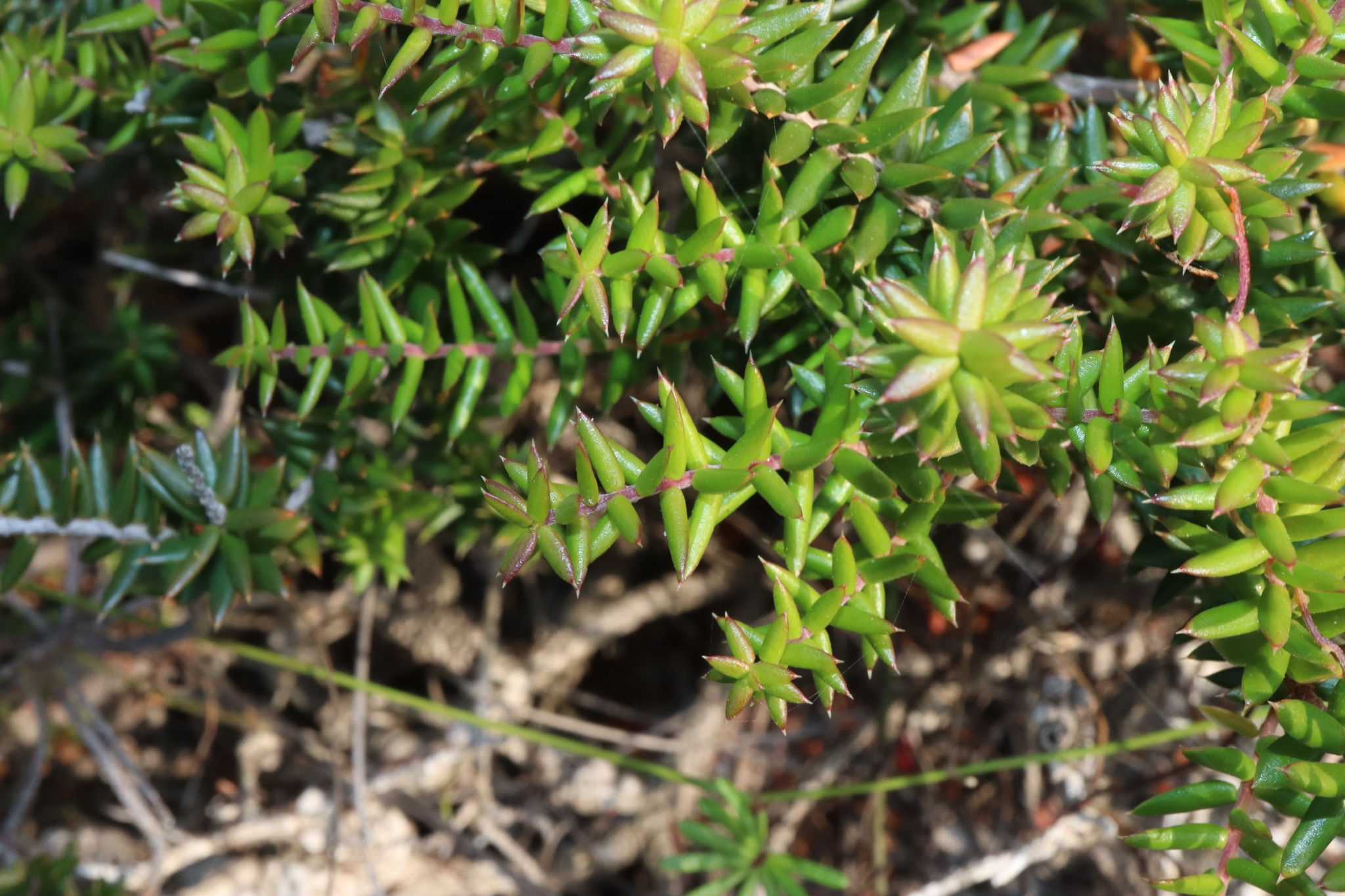
- In Fitzgerald River National Park

Scientific classification
- Kingdom: Plantae
- Clade: Tracheophytes
- Clade: Angiosperms
- Clade: Eudicots
- Clade: Asterids
- Order: Ericales
- Family: Ericaceae
- Genus: Acrotriche
- Species: A. ramiflora

Binomial name
- Acrotriche ramiflora R.Br.
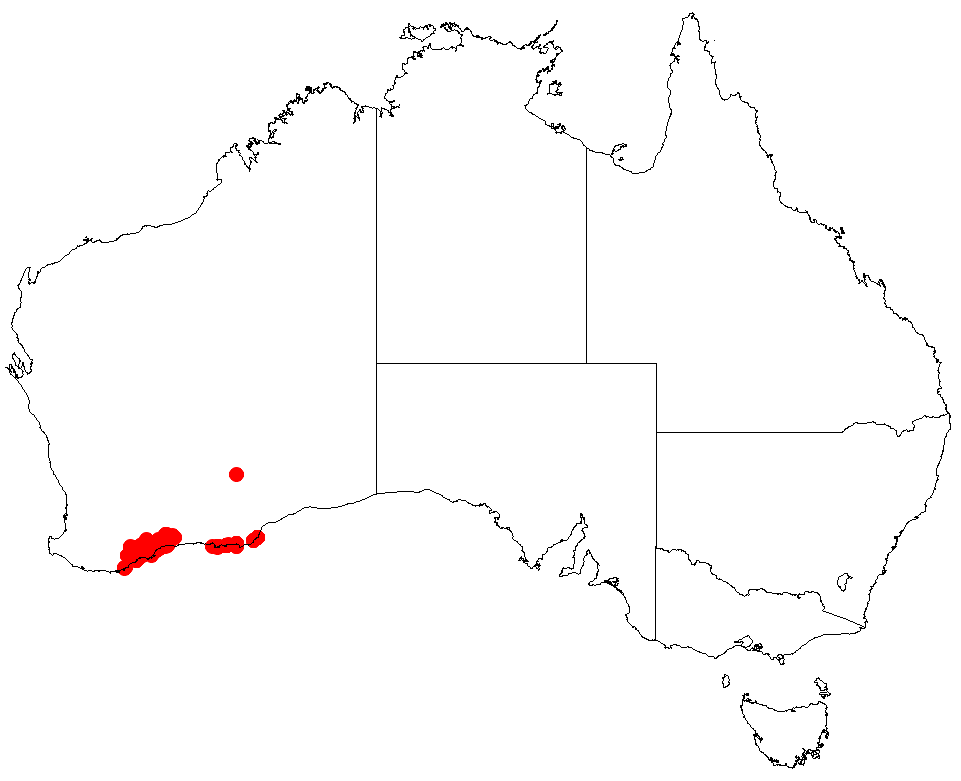
- Occurrence data from Australasian Virtual Herbarium

= Acrotriche ramiflora =

Species of plant

Acrotriche ramiflora is a species of flowering plant in the family Ericaceae and is endemic to the south of Western Australia. It is an erect or spreading shrub with linear to lance-shaped leaves and small pinkish, tube-shaped flowers and red, flattened spherical drupes.

== Description ==
Acrotriche ramiflora is an erect or spreading, divaricately branched shrub that typically grows to up 0.5–1 m (1 ft 8 in – 3 ft 3 in) high and is more or less glabrous. Its leaves are linear to lance-shaped and sharply pointed, 6–8 mm (0.24–0.31 in) long, 1–2 mm (0.039–0.079 in) wide. The flowers are arranged in spikes of 6 to 10, 8–10 mm (0.31–0.39 in) long, scattered along old wood with bracteoles about 1.5 mm (0.059 in) long. The flowers are small, pinkish and fused at the base to form a cylindrical tube 2.5 mm (0.098 in) long, with lobes 1.5 mm (0.059 in) long. Flowering occurs from July to October and the fruit is a red, flattened spherical drupe about 4 mm (0.16 in) in diameter.

== Taxonomy and naming ==
Acrotriche ramiflora was first formally described in 1810 by Robert Brown in Prodromus florae Novae Hollandiae. The specific epithet (ramiflora) means 'branch-flowered', referring flowers appearing on old wood.

== Distribution and habitat ==
This species of Acrotriche grows on coastal dunes, sandplains, granite boulders and breakaways in the Esperance Plains and Jarrah Forest bioregions of southern Western Australia.
