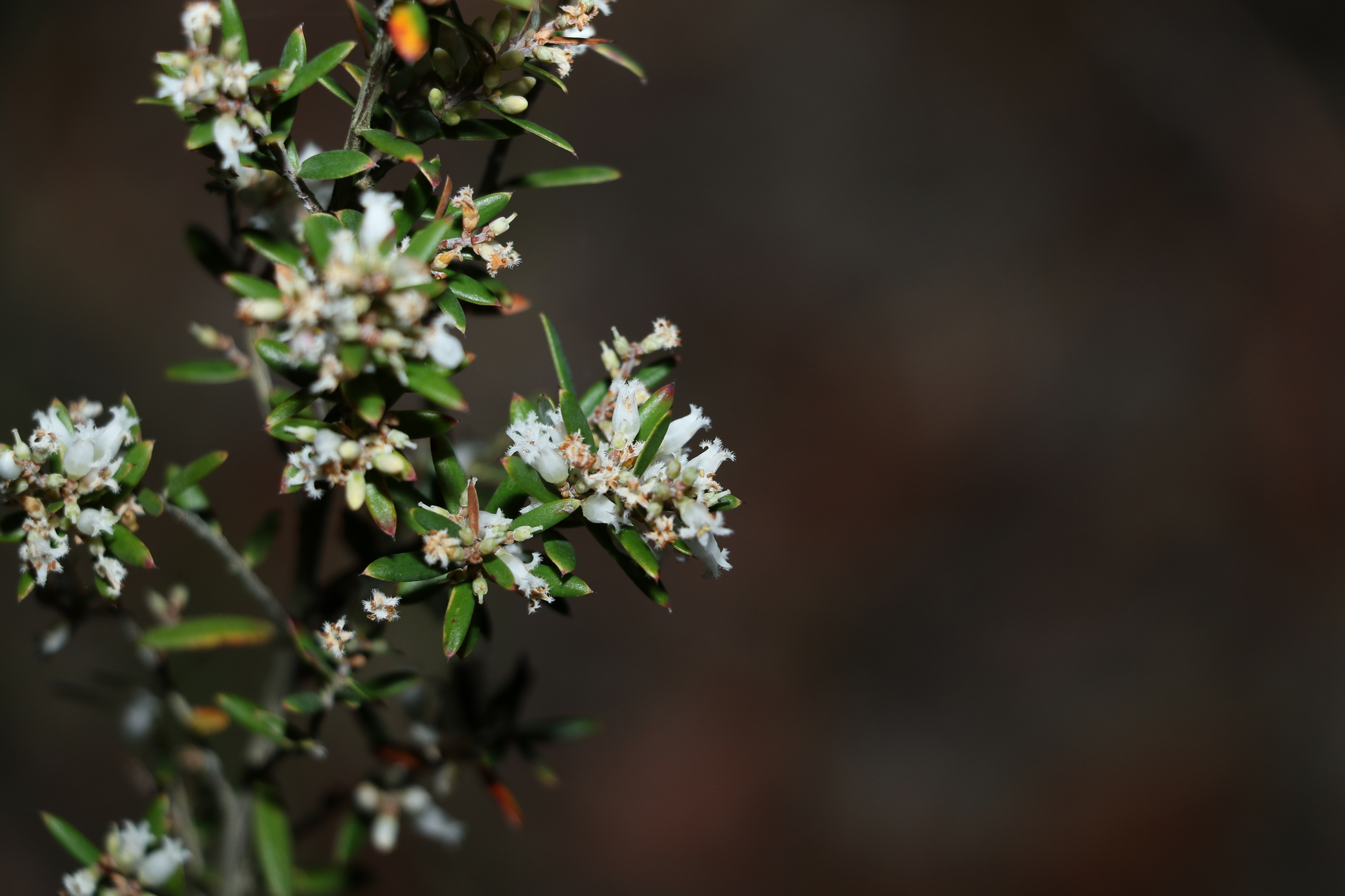
- In Chermside

Scientific classification
- Kingdom: Plantae
- Clade: Tracheophytes
- Clade: Angiosperms
- Clade: Eudicots
- Clade: Asterids
- Order: Ericales
- Family: Ericaceae
- Genus: Acrotriche
- Species: A. aggregata

Binomial name
- Acrotriche aggregata R.Br.
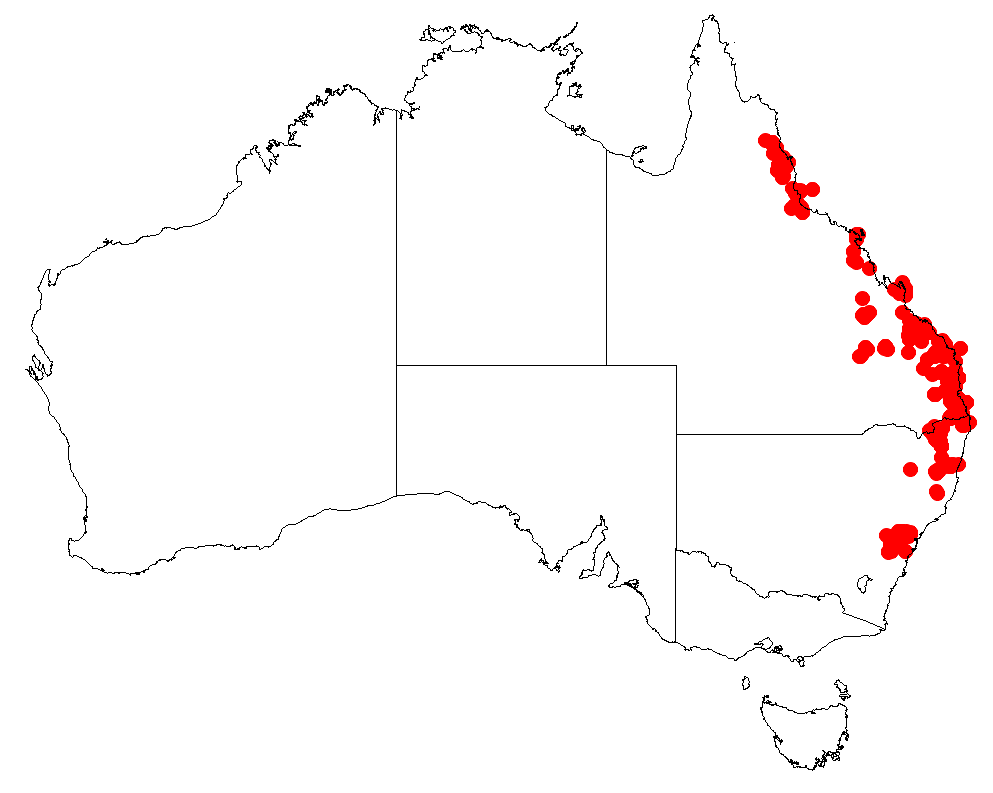
- Occurrence data from Australasian Virtual Herbarium

= Acrotriche aggregata =

Species of plant

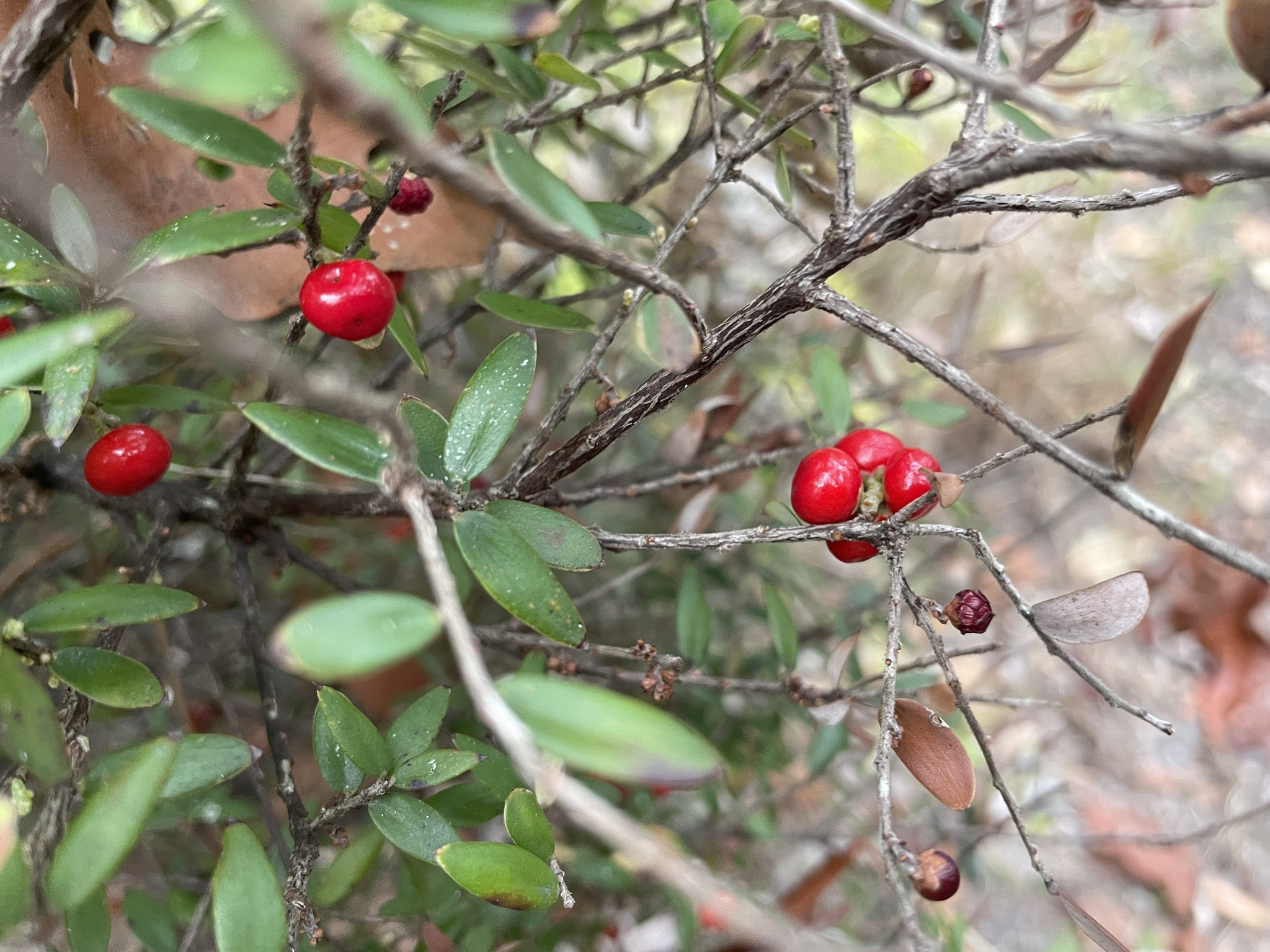
Near Koombooloomba

Acrotriche aggregata, commonly known as red cluster heath, tall acrotriche or tall groundberry is a species of flowering plant in the family Ericaceae and is endemic to eastern Australia. It is an erect, spreading shrub, with elliptic to egg-shaped leaves, and spikes of tube-shaped, pale green, cream-coloured or white flowers, and succulent red drupes.

== Description ==
Acrotriche aggregata is an erect, spreading shrub that typically grows to a height of about 0.4–1.2 m (1 ft 4 in – 3 ft 11 in), sometimes to 3 m (9.8 ft) or more. The leaves are elliptic to egg-shaped with the narrower end towards the base, 8–34 mm (0.31–1.34 in) long, 2.1–7 mm (0.083–0.276 in) wide and white with many veins on the lower surface. The flowers are arranged in spikes of 5 to 10 with bracteoles 1.0–1.2 mm (0.039–0.047 in) long at the base of the sepals. The sepals are 1.4–2.8 mm (0.055–0.110 in) long, and the petals are joined at the base to form a pale green, cream-coloured or white tube, 1.5–4 mm (0.059–0.157 in), with lobes 0.7–2 mm (0.028–0.079 in) long. Flowering occurs from September to October and the fruit is a red, flattened spherical drupe 3.8–7 mm (0.15–0.28 in) in diameter.

== Taxonomy ==
Acrotriche aggregata was first formally described in 1810 by Robert Brown in his Prodromus Florae Novae Hollandiae et Insulae Van Diemen. The specific epithet (aggregata) means "clustered" or "grouped".

== Distribution and habitat ==
Red cluster heath grows in forest and rainforest from Daintree National Park in Queensland to Yerranderie in New South Wales.
