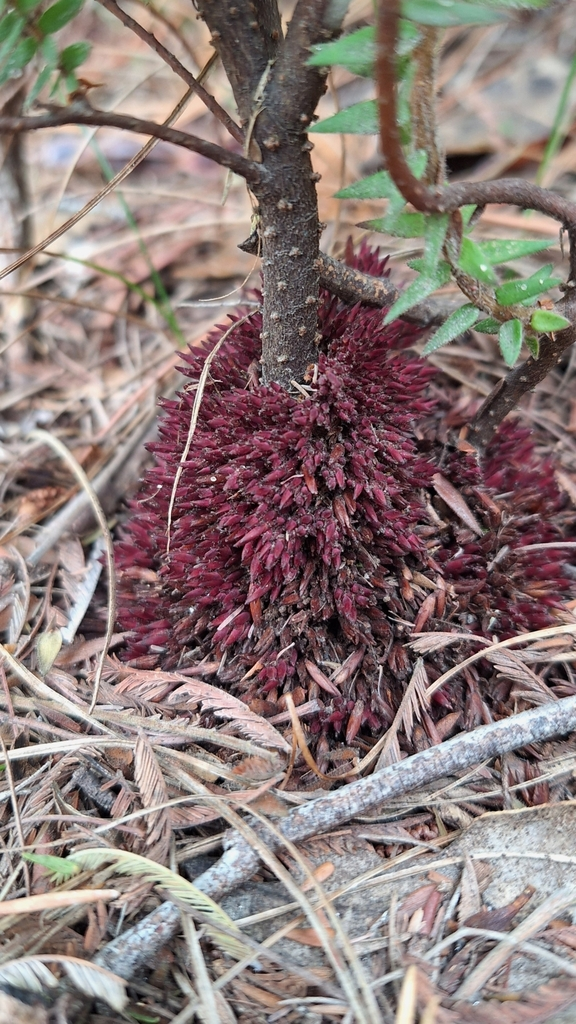
- On the Mount Lofty Ranges

Scientific classification
- Kingdom: Plantae
- Clade: Tracheophytes
- Clade: Angiosperms
- Clade: Eudicots
- Clade: Asterids
- Order: Ericales
- Family: Ericaceae
- Genus: Acrotriche
- Species: A. fasciculiflora

Binomial name
- Acrotriche fasciculiflora Regel
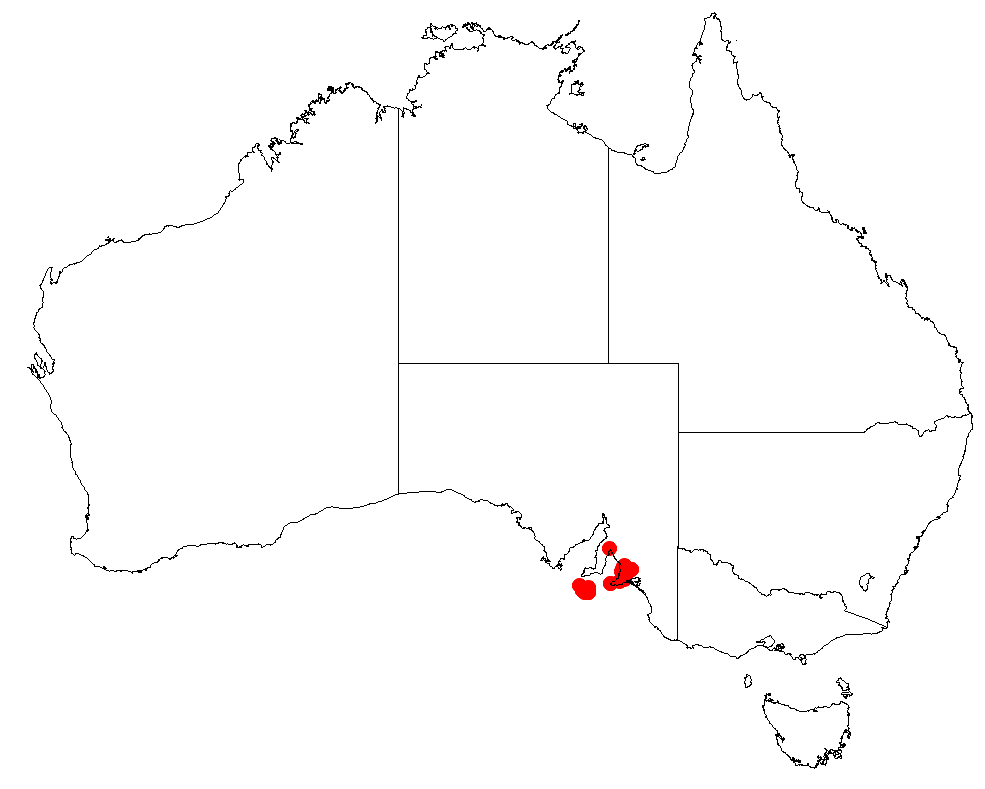
- Occurrence data from Australasian Virtual Herbarium

= Acrotriche fasciculiflora =

Species of plant

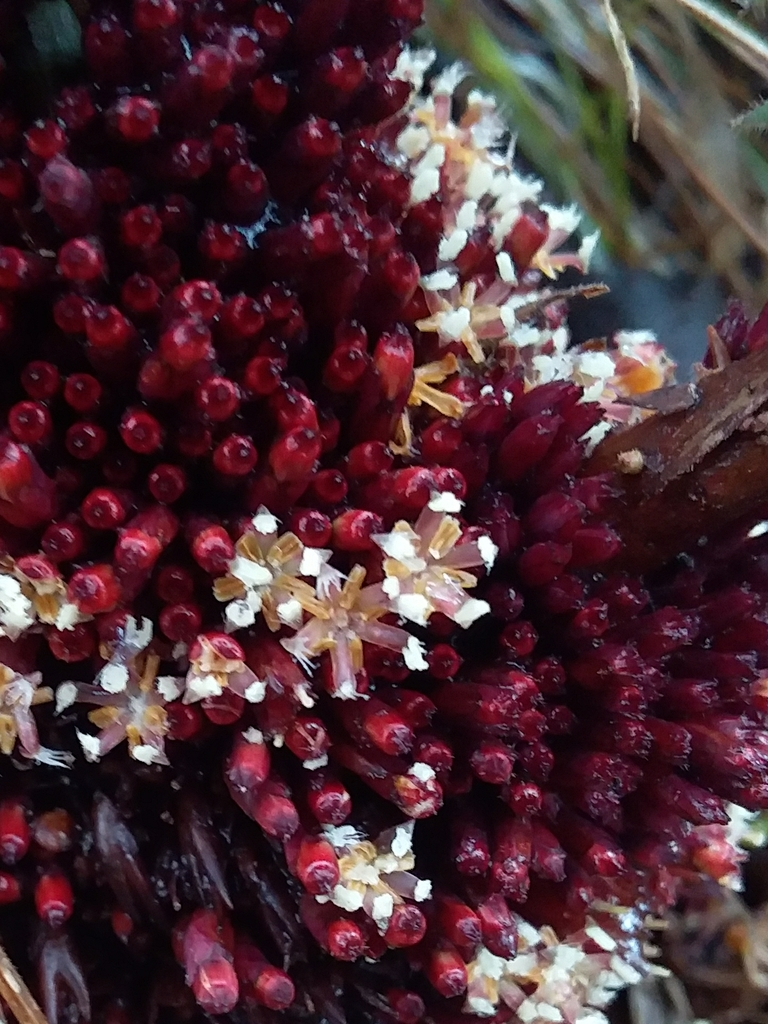
Flower detail

Acrotriche fasciculiflora, commonly known as pink ground-berry, is a flowering plant in the family Ericaceae. It is a rigid shrub with lance-shaped leaves, pale pink flowers and flattened spherical, pink fruit.

== Description ==
Acrotriche fasciculiflora is a rigid shrub that typically grows a height of 0.5–1.5 m (1 ft 8 in – 4 ft 11 in) and has reddish-brown young branches. The leaves are lance-shaped, 7–12 mm (0.28–0.47 in) long, 2–4 mm (0.079–0.157 in) wide on a petiole 0.2–0.5 mm (0.0079–0.0197 in) long and taper to a fine point. The flowers are pale pink in densely crowded spikes at the base of the stem or sometimes at the base of branches, sometimes forming a mass 5–7 mm (0.20–0.28 in) in diameter. There are egg-shaped to oblong bracts 1.5–2.4 mm (0.059–0.094 in) long and bracteoles 2.0–2.3 mm (0.079–0.091 in) long at the base of the sepals. The sepals are sparsely hairy, 3.3–5.1 mm (0.13–0.20 in) long and 1.2–1.8 mm (0.047–0.071 in) wide and the petals are joined at the base to form a tube 4.4–8.2 mm (0.17–0.32 in) long with lobes 2.4–2.6 mm (0.094–0.102 in) long. The anthers are pale orange and the ovary is glabrous, 0.8–1.1 mm (0.031–0.043 in) long and 0.7–0.9 mm (0.028–0.035 in) wide. Flowering occurs between August and October and the fruit is pink, flattened spherical, 2.0–2.9 mm (0.079–0.114 in) long and 2.5–3.3 mm (0.098–0.130 in) long.

== Taxonomy and naming ==
This species was first formally described in 1852 by Eduard August von Regel who gave it the name Froebelia fasciculora in his botanical magazine Gartenflora. In 1868, George Bentham transferred the species to the genus Acrotriche as A. fasciculiflora in his Flora Australiensis. The specific epithet (fasciculiflora) means "flowers in a small bundle".

== Distribution and habitat ==
Pink ground-berry grows in open sclerophyll forest in the southern Mount Lofty Ranges and on Kangaroo Island in South Australia.
