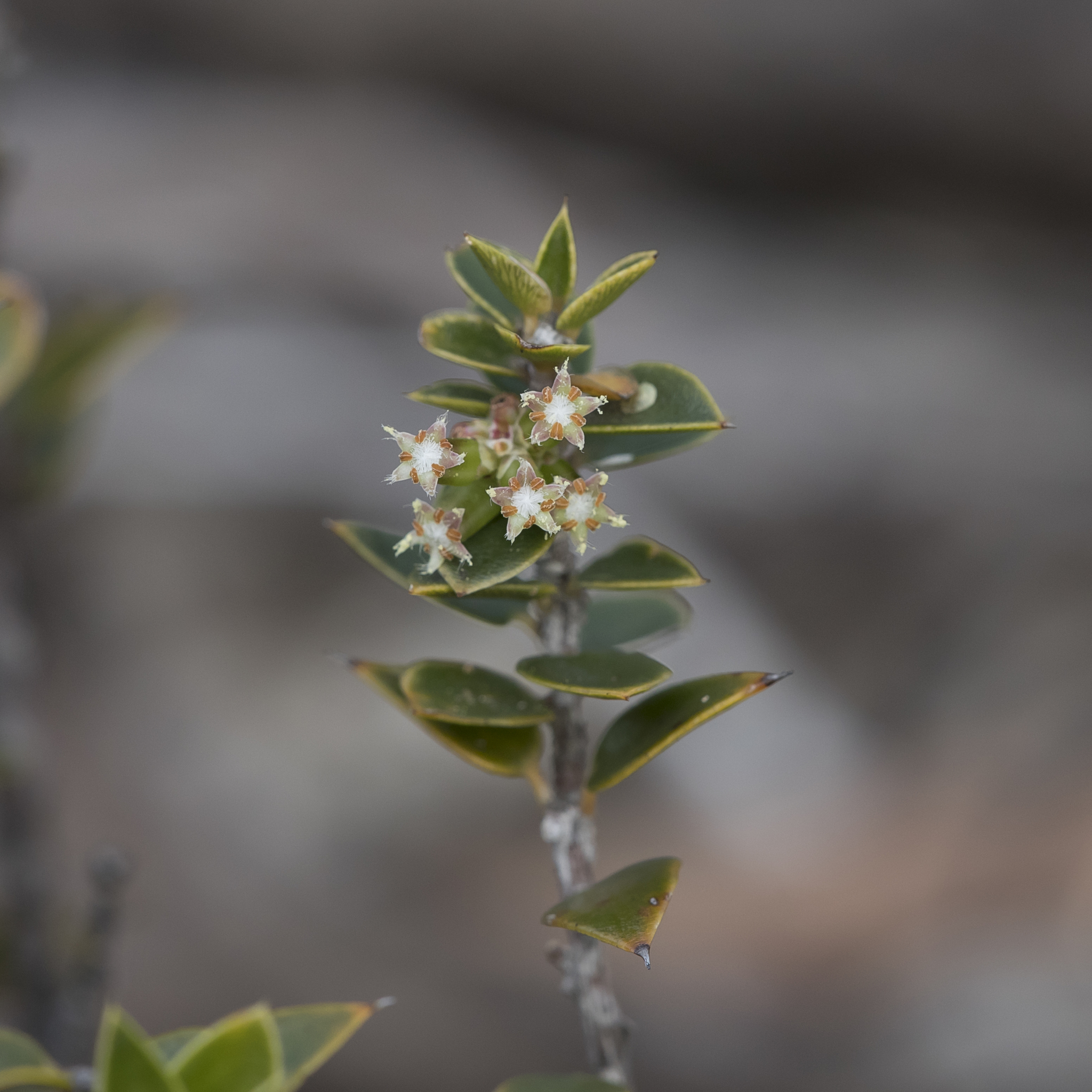
- In Lincoln National Park

Scientific classification
- Kingdom: Plantae
- Clade: Tracheophytes
- Clade: Angiosperms
- Clade: Eudicots
- Clade: Asterids
- Order: Ericales
- Family: Ericaceae
- Genus: Acrotriche
- Species: A. patula

Binomial name
- Acrotriche patula R.Br.

= Acrotriche patula =

Species of plant

Acrotriche patula, commonly known as shiny ground-berry is a species of flowering plant in the family Ericaceae and is endemic to the south of continental Australia. It is a rigid, prickly shrub with egg-shaped or narrowly egg-shaped leaves and small green, tube-shaped flowers and fleshy, red, spherical or oval fruit.

== Description ==
Acrotriche patula is a rigid, divaricately branched, prickly shrub that typically grows to up 60 cm (24 in) high and wide, its young branchlets reddish-brown. Its leaves are thick, widely spreading, egg-shaped or narrowly egg-shaped, sharply pointed, 8–16 mm (0.31–0.63 in) long, 3–6 mm (0.12–0.24 in) wide and glabrous. The flowers are arranged in leaf axils in groups of 5 or 10, with bracts 0.7–0.9 mm (0.028–0.035 in) long and egg-shaped to more or less circular bracteoles 1.1–1.5 mm (0.043–0.059 in) long. The sepals are egg-shaped, 1.5–1.7 mm (0.059–0.067 in) long. The flowers are greenish or yellowish-green and fused at the base to form a cylindrical tube, 2.2–4.2 mm (0.087–0.165 in) long with widely-spreading lobes 1.0–1.3 mm (0.039–0.051 in) long. Flowering occurs from June to September and the fruit is a red, spherical or flattened spherical drupe3.5–5.0 mm (0.14–0.20 in) long and 4–6.3 mm (0.16–0.25 in) wide.

== Taxonomy and naming ==
Acrotriche patula was first formally described in 1810 by Robert Brown and the description was published in Prodromus florae Novae Hollandiae. The specific epithet (patula) means "wide open" or "spreading", referring to its branching habit.

== Distribution and habitat ==
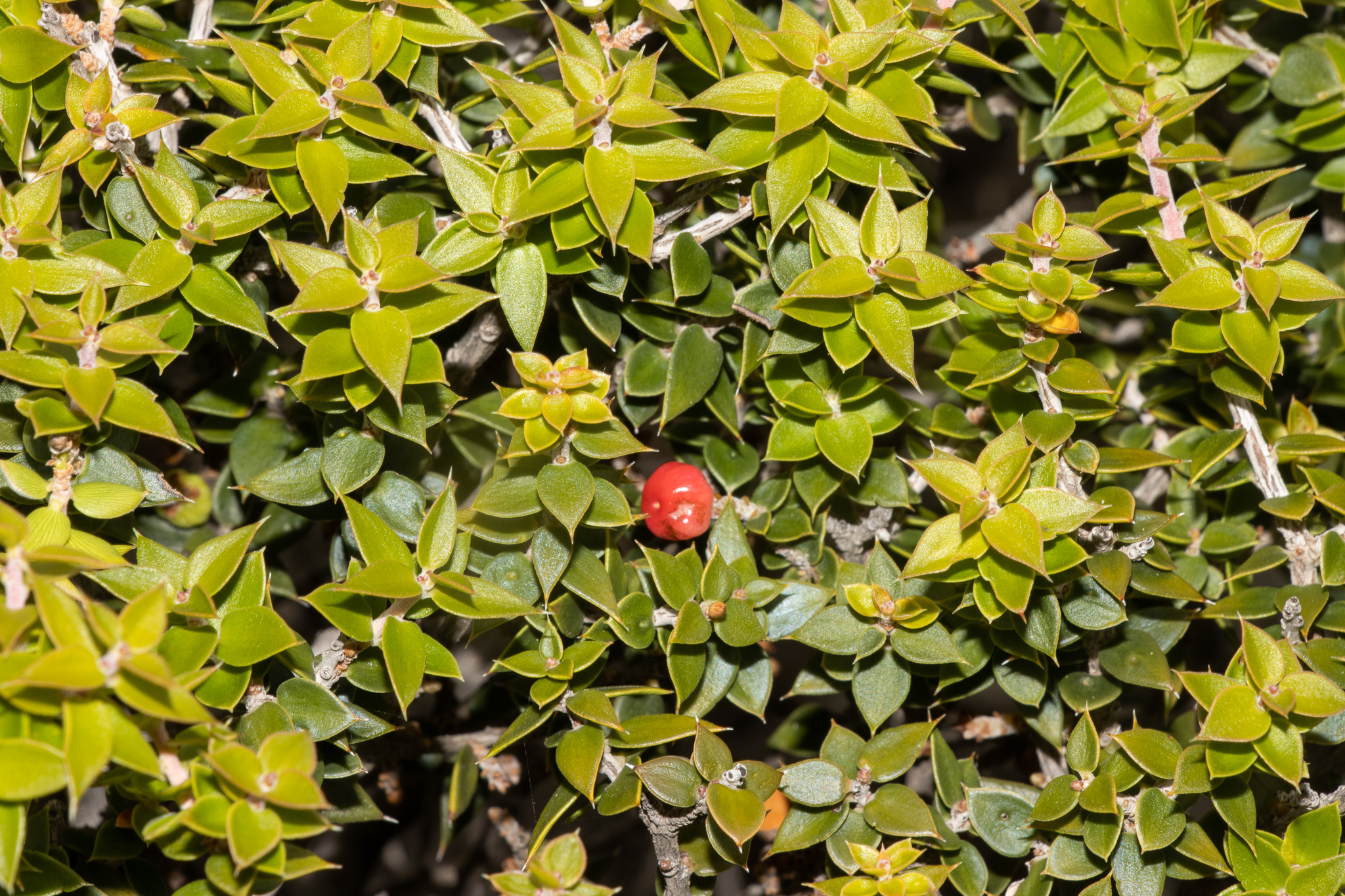
Shiny Ground-berry (Acrotriche patula) in Australia

Shiny ground-berry grows on coastal limestone in mallee scrub along the coast of southern Western Australia in the Hampton and Mallee bioregions, but mostly in South Australia, including in the Nullarbor, Eyre Yorke Block and Kangaroo Island bioregions.
