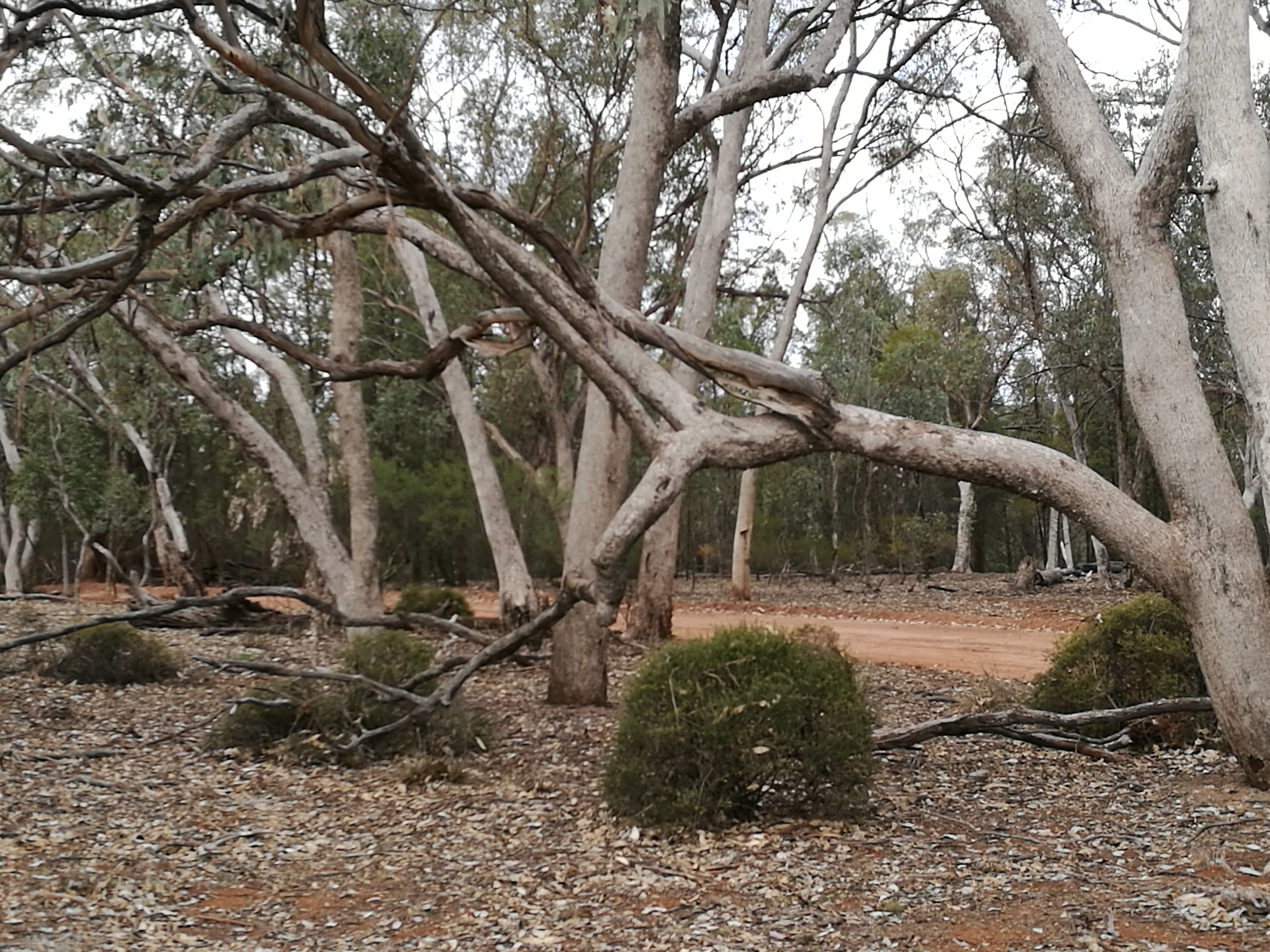
- Habit in Goulburn River National Park
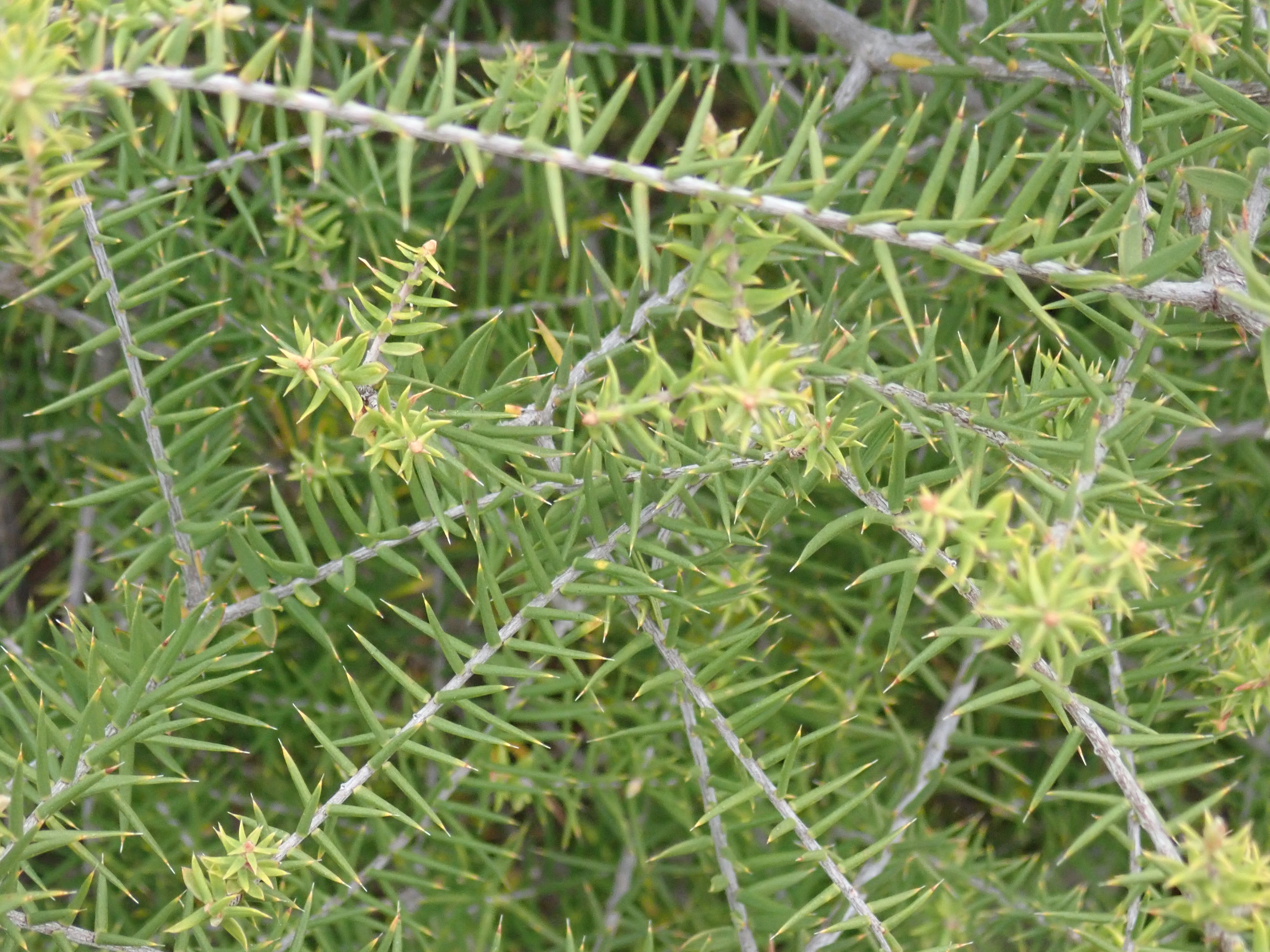
- Foliage in Wollemi National Park

Scientific classification
- Kingdom: Plantae
- Clade: Tracheophytes
- Clade: Angiosperms
- Clade: Eudicots
- Clade: Asterids
- Order: Ericales
- Family: Ericaceae
- Genus: Acrotriche
- Species: A. rigida

Binomial name
- Acrotriche rigida B.R.Paterson
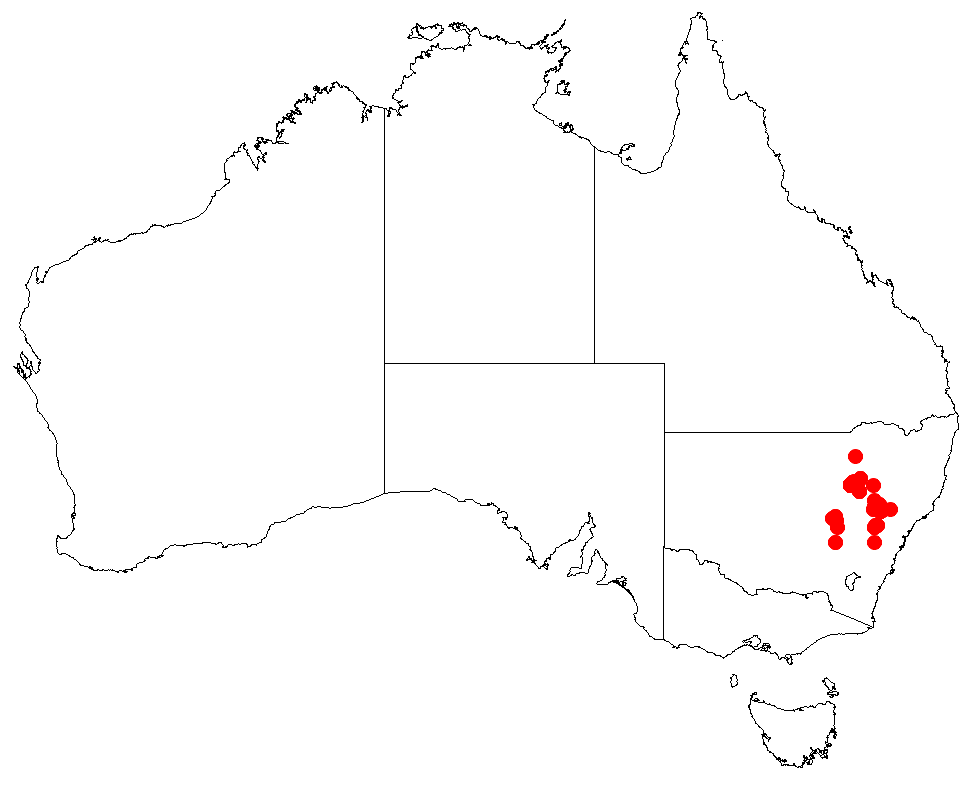
- Occurrence data from the Australasian Virtual Herbarium

= Acrotriche rigida =

Species of flowering plant

Acrotriche rigida is a species of flowering plant in the family Ericaceae and is endemic to New South Wales. It is a rigid, clump-forming, densely-branched shrub with stiff, spreading, sharply-pointed, lance-shaped leaves and spikes of 4 to 7 green flowers and flattened spherical, creamy-green drupes.

== Description ==
Acrotriche rigida is a rigid, clump-forming, densely-branched shrub, that typically grows up to 1.8 m (5 ft 11 in) high and 1.2 m (3 ft 11 in) wide. The leaves are stiffly spreading, sharply-pointed, lance-shaped 6–11 mm (0.24–0.43 in) long and 1.0–1.6 mm (0.039–0.063 in) wide on a petiole 0.8–1.0 mm (0.031–0.039 in) long with the edges strongly curved downwards. The leaves are whitish, with 3 to 5 veins, deeply grooved on the lower surface and with the edges curved strongly downwards. The flowers are green and usually arranged in spikes of 4 to 7 with bracteoles 1.0–1.5 mm (0.039–0.059 in) long. The sepals are 1.4–2.8 mm (0.055–0.110 in) long and the petals are joined at the base, forming a tube 2.5–3.5 mm (0.098–0.138 in) long with lobes 1.0–1.8 mm (0.039–0.071 in) long. The ovary has 4 or 5 locules. Flowering occurs from July to September and the fruit is a creamy-green, flattened, spherical drupe, 2.5–3.0 mm (0.098–0.118 in) in diameter and covered with short white hairs.

== Taxonomy ==
Acrotriche rigida was first formally described in 1960 by Betsy Rivers Jackes (née Betsy R. Paterson) in the Proceedings of the Linnean Society of New South Wales, from specimens collected by Cyril Keith Ingram near the Goulburn River in 1958. The specific epithet (rigida) means 'hard' or 'stiff'.

== Distribution and habitat ==
This species of Acrotriche grows in scrub or dry sclerophyll forest on rocky hillsides between the Warrumbungles, Denman and Rylstone, and south to Goobang National Park.
