= Acrotriche parviflora =

Scientific classification
- Kingdom: Plantae
- Clade: Embryophytes
- Clade: Tracheophytes
- Clade: Angiosperms
- Clade: Eudicots
- Clade: Asterids
- Order: Ericales
- Family: Ericaceae
- Genus: Acrotriche
- Species: A. parviflora

Binomial name
- Acrotriche parviflora (Stschegl.) Hislop

Species of plant

Acrotriche parviflora is a species of flowering plant in the family Ericaceae and is endemic to the south of Western Australia. It is an erect, spreading or compact shrub, with oblong to narrowly egg-shaped leaves, and green, tube-shaped flowers.

== Description ==
Acrotriche parviflora is an erect, spreading or compact shrub that typically grows up to 1.2 m (3 ft 11 in) high. Its leaves are oblong to narrowly egg-shaped, 6.5–8.5 mm (0.26–0.33 in) long and glaucous. The flowers are arranged in small clusters and almost sessile in leaf axils with broad bracts and bracteoles. The petals are green and joined at the base forming a cylindrical tube and the ovary has 7 to 10 locules.

== Taxonomy ==
This species was first formally described in 1859 by Sergei Sergeyevich Sheglejev who gave it the name Decaspora parviflora in the journal Bulletin de la Société Impériale des Naturalistes de Moscou, from specimens collected by James Drummond.

In 1869, George Bentham transferred the species to Trochocarpa as T. parviflora in his Flora Australiensis

In 2007, Michael Clyde Hislop suggested that both Sheglejev and Bentham apparently only saw specimens with very immature flower buds, and were misled as to "the species' true affinities". Hislop transferred the species to Acrotriche as A. parviflora. The specific epithet (parviflora) means 'small-flowered'.

== Distribution and habitat ==
Acrotriche parviflora grows on flats, slopes, hills, near creeks and slatlakes in the Avon Wheatbelt, Esperance Plains, Jarrah Forest and Mallee bioregions of southern Western Australia.

== Conservation status ==
This species is listed as "not threatened" by the Government of Western Australia Department of Biodiversity, Conservation and Attractions.
