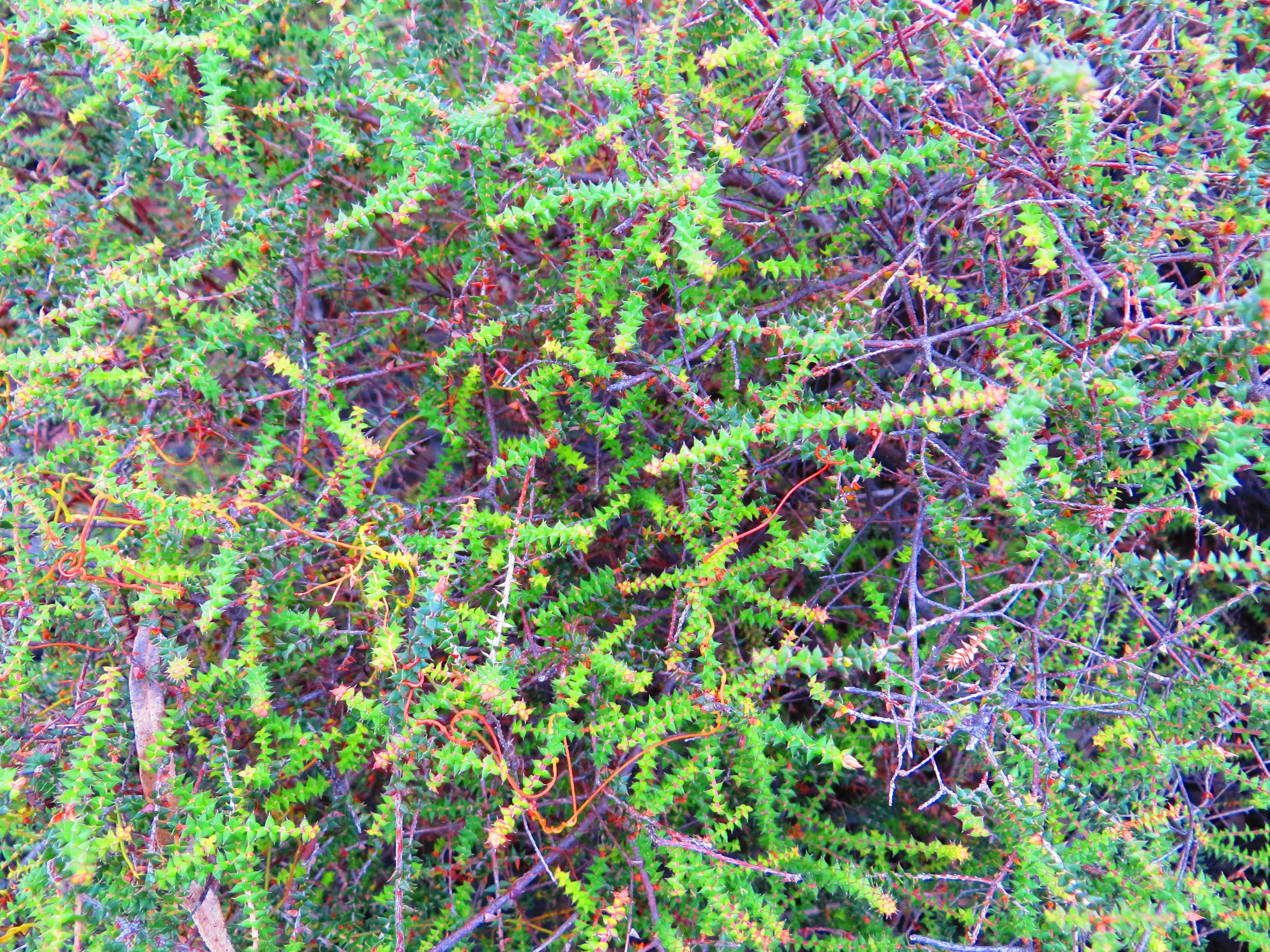
- In Beyeria Conservation Park

Scientific classification
- Kingdom: Plantae
- Clade: Tracheophytes
- Clade: Angiosperms
- Clade: Eudicots
- Clade: Asterids
- Order: Ericales
- Family: Ericaceae
- Genus: Acrotriche
- Species: A. depressa

Binomial name
- Acrotriche depressa R.Br.
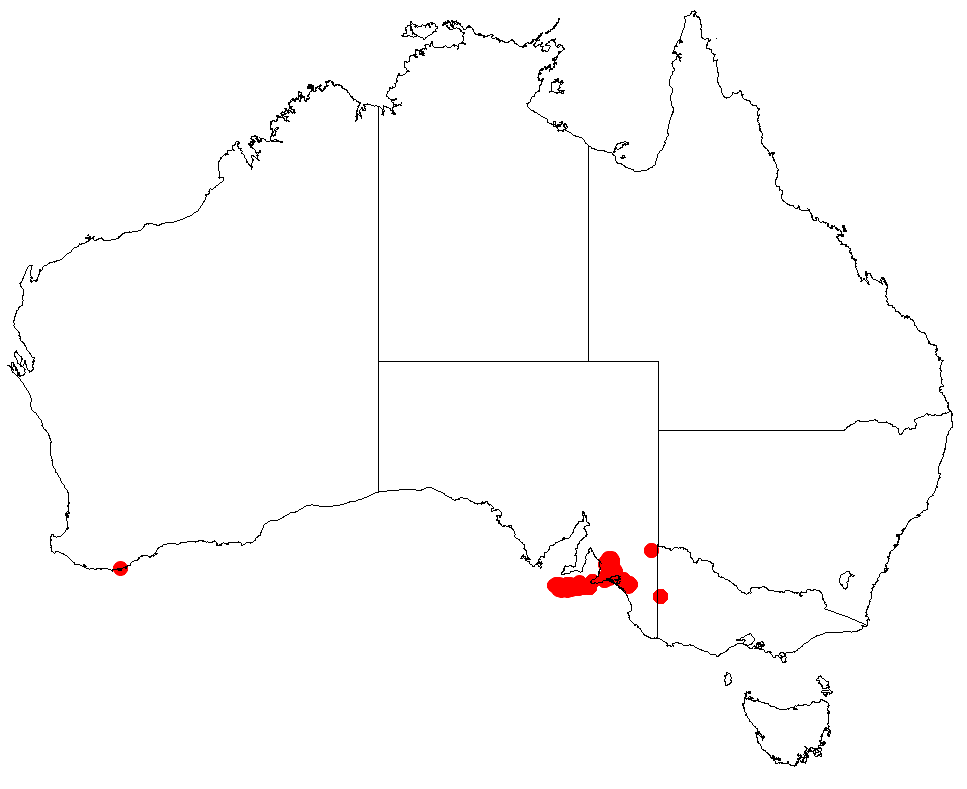
- Occurrence data from Australasian Virtual Herbarium

= Acrotriche depressa =

Species of plant

Acrotriche depressa, commonly known as wiry ground-berry or honeypots, is a flowering plant in the family Ericaceae. It is a small shrub with crowded greyish-green leaves and white or green flowers and grows in southern Australia.

== Description ==
Acrotriche depressa is a small, dense, mat forming, upright shrub to 30 cm (12 in) high, 1 m (3 ft 3 in) in diameter and branchlets covered in soft, upright hairs to rigid, long, upright hairs. The leaves are crowded, spreading or slightly erect, greyish olive green, narrow-triangular, 3.5–13 mm (0.14–0.51 in) long, 0.5–3 mm (0.020–0.118 in) wide, margins slightly recurved, usually toothed, veined on lower surface, pointed at the apex and in whorls around the stem. The white or greenish tubular flowers are 2.4–2.9 mm (0.094–0.114 in) long in dense clusters of 5-10 on spikes 15–30 mm (0.59–1.18 in) long hidden amongst older branches. The bracteoles mostly 1–1.5 mm (0.039–0.059 in) long, sepals 1.4–2.8 mm (0.055–0.110 in) long. Flowering occurs from August to September and the fruit is a drupe, globular-shaped, greyish green, dark purple at maturity and up to 4.5 mm (0.18 in) wide.

== Taxonomy and naming ==
Acrotriche depressa was first formally described in 1810 by Robert Brown and the description was published in Prodromus florae Novae Hollandiae. The specific epithet (depressa) means "depressed" referring to its growth habit.

== Distribution and habitat ==
Honeypots grows in sclerophyll forest on a variety of soils, including loam, basalt, granite and sandy soil in Victoria, Tasmania, South Australia, Australian Capital Territory and New South Wales.
