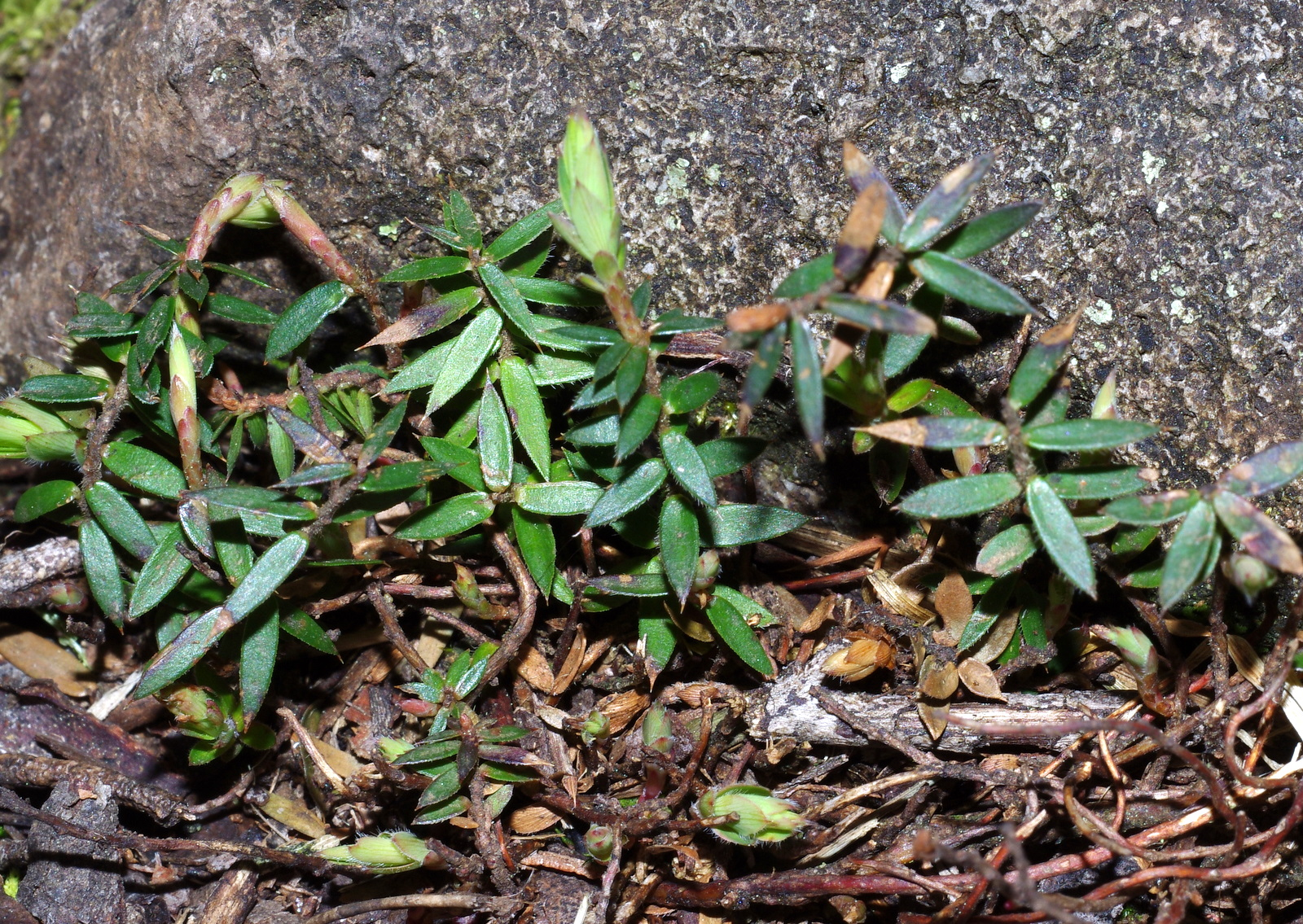

Scientific classification
- Kingdom: Plantae
- Clade: Tracheophytes
- Clade: Angiosperms
- Clade: Eudicots
- Clade: Asterids
- Order: Ericales
- Family: Ericaceae
- Genus: Acrotriche
- Species: A. prostrata

Binomial name
- Acrotriche prostrata F.Muell.
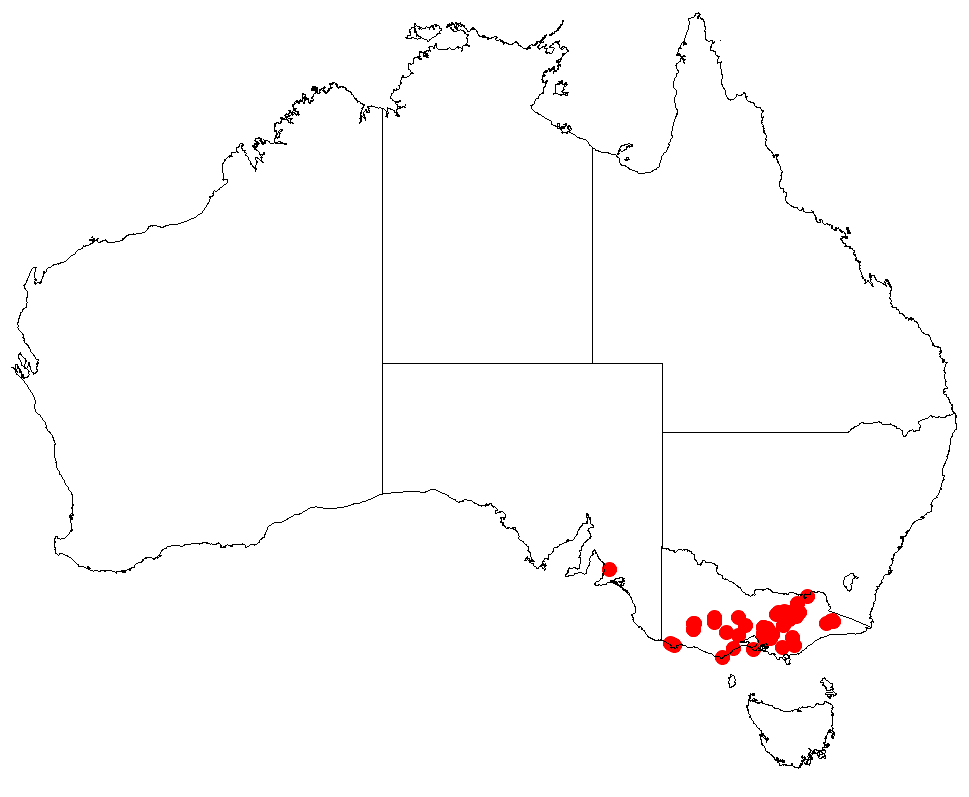
- Occurrence data from Australasian Virtual Herbarium

= Acrotriche prostrata =

Species of flowering plant

Acrotriche prostrata, commonly known as trailing ground-berry, is a species of flowering plant in the family Ericaceae and is endemic to Victoria. It is a trailing shrub with prostrate stems, widely spreading, lance-shaped to egg-shaped leaves and spikes of 5 to 14 light green flowers and spherical, green drupes.

== Description ==
Acrotriche prostrata is a training shrub that has prostrate main stems and short side stems that sometimes grow to a height of up to about 15 cm (5.9 in), the branchlets hairy. The leaves are widely-spreading, lance-shaped to egg-shaped, 4–16 mm (0.16–0.63 in) long, 1–8 mm (0.039–0.315 in) wide and sharply-pointed. The flowers are arranged in spikes of 5 to 14 on the previous year's or older wood with bracteoles 2–3 mm (0.079–0.118 in) long. The sepals are 2.8–4.0 mm (0.11–0.16 in) long and the petals are light green and joined at the base forming a tube 5.5–6.5 mm (0.22–0.26 in) long, the lobes 2.3–2.6 mm (0.091–0.102 in) long. Flowering mostly occurs between April and July and the fruit is an oval, greenish drupe 5–7 mm (0.20–0.28 in) long.

== Taxonomy ==
Acrotriche prostrate was first formally described in 1855 by Ferdinand von Mueller in Transactions and Proceedings of the Victorian Institute for the Advancement of Science. The specific epithet (prostrata) means "lying along the ground".

== Distribution and habitat ==
Trailing ground-berry often grows in damp forests, mostly in the southern half of Victoria.
