= Acrotriche halmaturina =

Scientific classification
- Kingdom: Plantae
- Clade: Tracheophytes
- Clade: Angiosperms
- Clade: Eudicots
- Clade: Asterids
- Order: Ericales
- Family: Ericaceae
- Genus: Acrotriche
- Species: A. halmaturina

Binomial name
- Acrotriche halmaturina B.R.Paterson
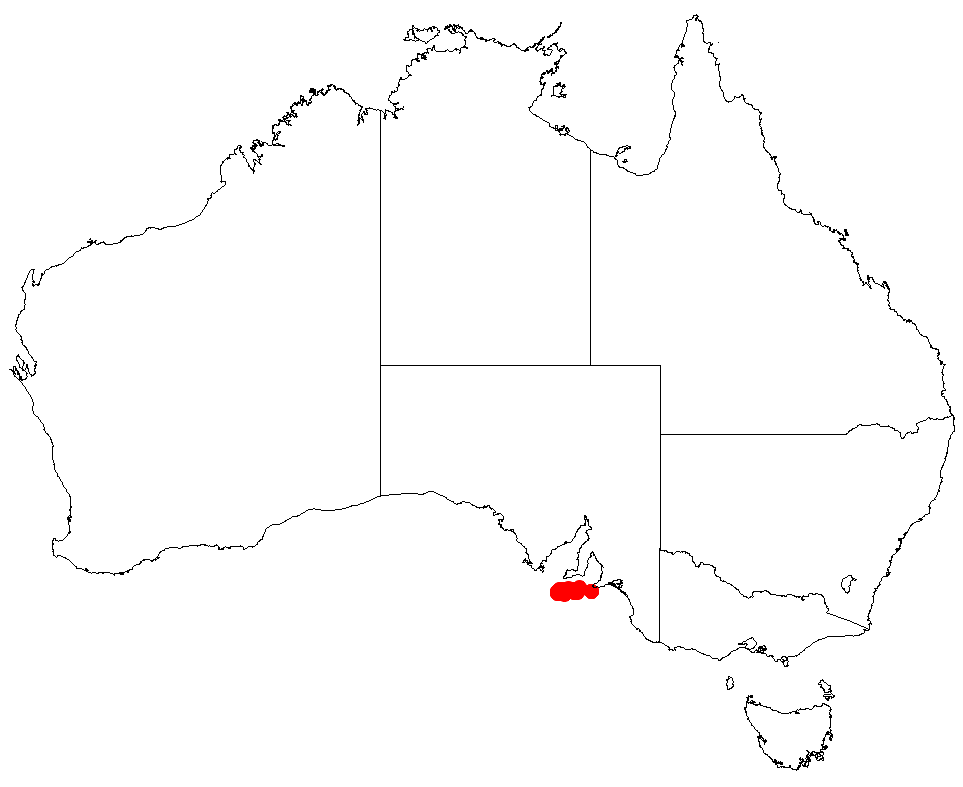
- Occurrence data from Australasian Virtual Herbarium

Species of plant

Acrotriche halmaturina, commonly known as Kangaroo Island ground-berry, is a flowering plant in the family Ericaceae. It is a shrub with egg-shaped leaves, curved flowers near ground level with tube-shaped petals, and spherical fruit.

== Description ==
Acrotriche halmaturina is a shrub that typically grows a height of 15–30 cm (5.9–11.8 in) and has the base of stems below the ground, the young stems with reddish-brown hairs. The leaves are egg-shaped, 5–12 mm (0.20–0.47 in) long, 2–4 mm (0.079–0.157 in) wide on a petiole 0.5–0.7 mm (0.020–0.028 in) long. The flowers are curved with clusters of 8 to 12 on the stem at ground level with narrow bracteoles about 2 mm (0.079 in) long and 1 mm (0.039 in) wide at the base of the sepals. The sepals are pale green, narrowly lance-shaped, 8 mm (0.31 in) long and 1.5 mm (0.059 in) wide and the petals are joined at the base to form a tube 5 mm (0.20 in) long with reddish hairs on the ends of the lobes. The anthers are round, about 1 mm (0.039 in) long on a short filament and the ovary is 2 mm (0.079 in) long and 1.5 mm (0.059 in) in diameter. Flowering occurs in August and September and the fruit is spherical, about 4.5 mm (0.18 in) long and 4 mm (0.16 in) long.

== Taxonomy and naming ==
Acrotriche halmaturina was first formally described in 1960 by Betsy Rivers Paterson from specimens she collected near the Western Highway on Kangaroo Island in 1958. The specific epithet (halmaturina) is derived from Halmaturus, a name once applied to a genus of kangaroos, and commonly used for species from Kangaroo Island.

== Distribution and habitat ==
Kangaroo Island ground-berry grows in poor soils on Flinders Chase on Kangaroo Island in South Australia.
