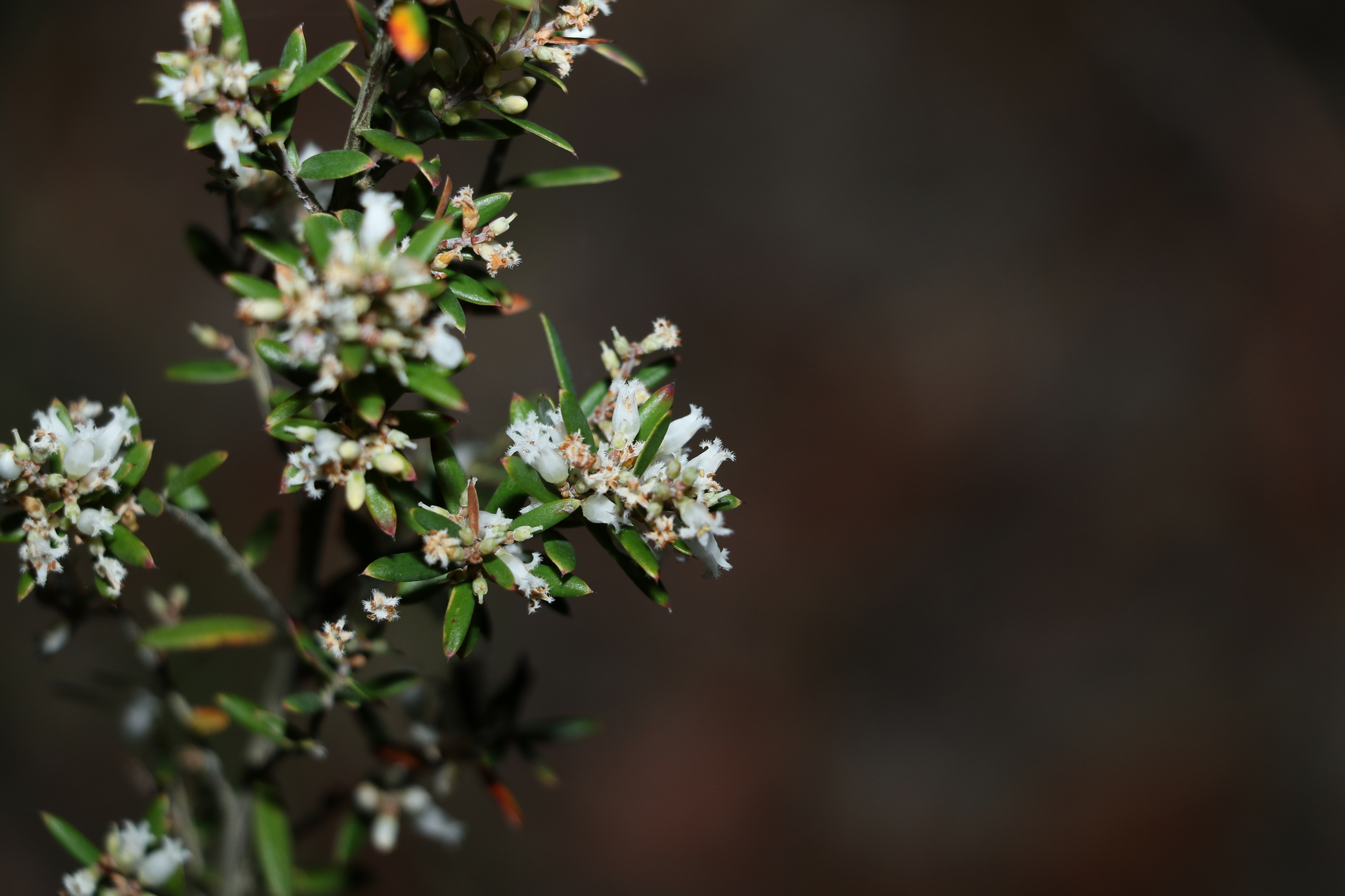
- Acrotriche aggregata

Scientific classification
- Kingdom: Plantae
- Clade: Tracheophytes
- Clade: Angiosperms
- Clade: Eudicots
- Clade: Asterids
- Order: Ericales
- Family: Ericaceae
- Subfamily: Epacridoideae
- Tribe: Styphelieae
- Genus: Acrotriche; R.Br.

Species
- See text

Synonyms
- Acrothrix Clem. ex Airy Shaw orth. var.; Acrotiche Poir. orth. var.; Acrotrichne Hopper, S.J.van Leeuwen, A.P.Br. & S.J.Patrick orth. var.; Froebelia Regel; Styphelia sect. Acrotriche (R.Br.) Kuntze

= Acrotriche =

Genus of flowering plants

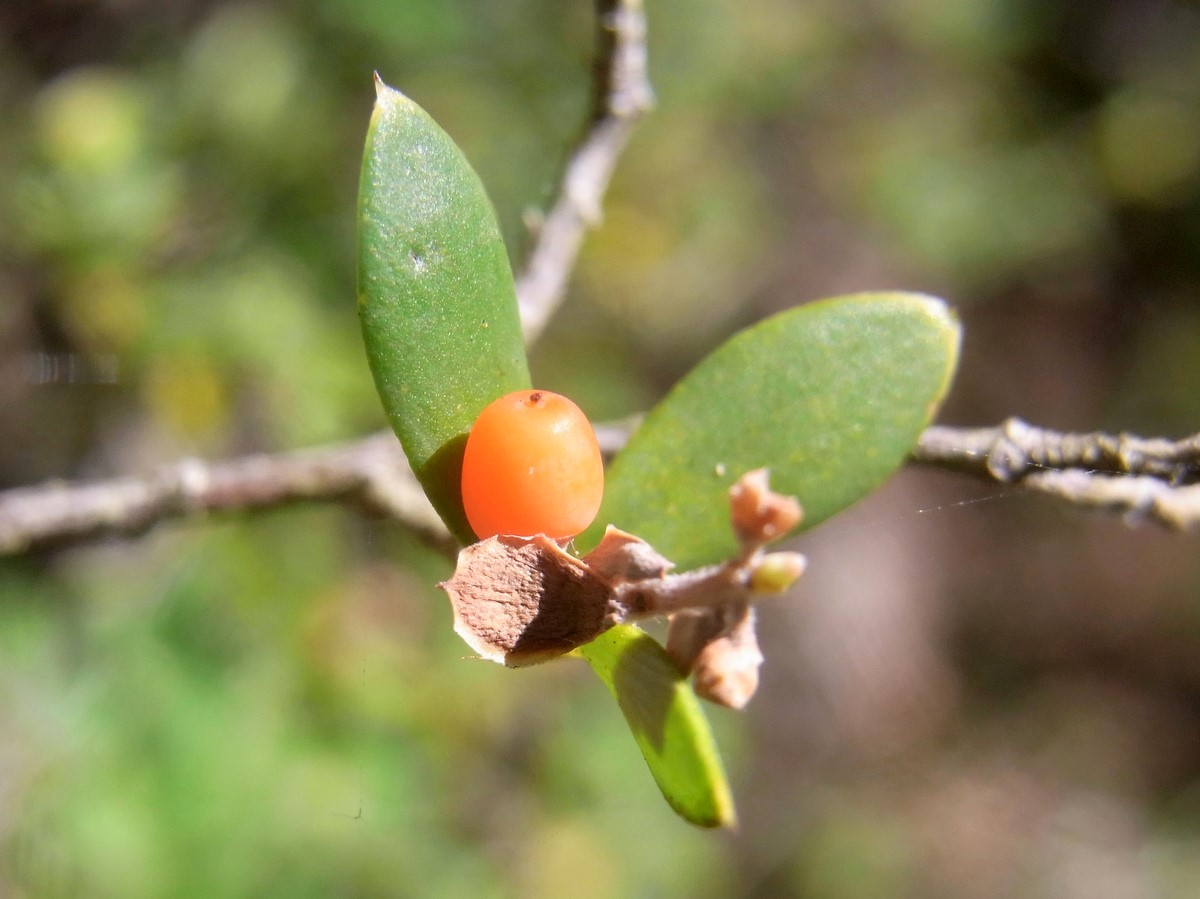
Fruit of Acrotriche divaricata

Acrotriche is a genus of about 18 species of flowering plants in the family Ericaceae, occurring in all states of Australia except the Northern Territory. Plants in the genus Acrotriche are shrubs with hairy branchlets, leaves with more or less parallel veins and small flowers with 5 sepals and petals joined at the base to form a bell-shaped to cylindrical tube with hairs and stamens in the throat.

== Description ==
Plants in the genus Acrotriche are shrubs with branchlets with fine, soft or downy hairs, and leaves with short petioles and more or less parallel veins and a lighter shade of green on the lower surface. The flowers are small and bisexual, sessile or on a short spike in leaf axils with a bract and 2 bracteoles below the 5 sepals. The bracts, bracteoles and sepals are egg-shaped to almost round. The 5 petals are joined at the base to form a bell-shaped or cylindrical tube with 5 tufts of hair in the throat and the tube filled with nectar. The petal lobes are triangular with the anthers bent backwards between the lobes. The ovary is more or less spherical with 2 to 7 locules, each locule with one ovule. The fruit is a drupe with a pulpy mesocarp and a hard endocarp.

== Taxonomy ==
The genus Acrotriche was first formally described in 1810 by Robert Brown in his Prodromus Florae Novae Hollandiae et Insulae Van Diemen. The genus name (Acrotriche) means "hair at the end".

=== Species list ===
The following is a list of Acrotriche species accepted by Australian Plant Census as at April 2024:

- Acrotriche affinis DC. - ridged ground-berry (S.A., Vic., Tas.)
- Acrotriche aggregata R.Br. - red cluster heath, tall groundberry or tall acrotriche (Qld., N.S.W.)
- Acrotriche baileyana (Domin) J.M.Powell (Qld.)
- Acrotriche cordata (Labill.) R.Br. - coast ground-berry (W.A., S.A., Vic., Tas.)
- Acrotriche depressa R.Br. - wiry ground-berry (S.A., Vic.)
- Acrotriche divaricata R.Br. (N.S.W.)
- Acrotriche dura (Benth.) Quinn (W.A.)
- Acrotriche fasciculiflora (Regel) Benth. – pink ground-berry (S.A.)
- Acrotriche halmaturina B.R.Paterson (S.A.)
- Acrotriche lancifolia Hislop (W.A.)
- Acrotriche leucocarpa Jobson & Whiffin - tall acrotriche (N.S.W., A.C.T., Vic.)
- Acrotriche orbicularis Hislop (W.A.)
- Acrotriche parviflora (Stschegl.) Hislop (W.A.)
- Acrotriche patula R.Br. (W.A., S.A.)
- Acrotriche prostrata F.Muell. - trailing ground-berry (Vic.)
- Acrotriche ramiflora R.Br. (W.A.)
- Acrotriche rigida B.R.Paterson (N.S.W.)
- Acrotriche serrulata R.Br. - honeypots (S.A., N.S.W., A.C.T, Vic., Tas.)
