= Acrotriche dura =

Conservation status
- Priority Four — Rare Taxa (DEC)

Scientific classification
- Kingdom: Plantae
- Clade: Tracheophytes
- Clade: Angiosperms
- Clade: Eudicots
- Clade: Asterids
- Order: Ericales
- Family: Ericaceae
- Genus: Acrotriche
- Species: A. dura

Binomial name
- Acrotriche dura (Benth.) Quinn

Species of plant

Acrotriche dura is a species of flowering plant in the family Ericaceae and is endemic to southern Western Australia. It is a slender, erect, glabrous shrub, with oblong to linear leaves, and spikes of tube-shaped white flowers, and flattened spherical drupes.

== Description ==
Acrotriche dura is a slender, erect shrub that typically grows to a height of about 1 m (3 ft 3 in) and has glabrous branches. The leaves are linear or lance-shaped, slightly sharply-pointed, 4–9 mm (0.16–0.35 in) long on a short petiole. The flowers are arranged singly or in groups of up to 3 in leaf axils with very small bracts and bracteoles, the sepals about 1 mm (0.039 in) long, and the petals are joined at the base forming a white tube about 4 mm (0.16 in), with lobes as long as the petal tube. Flowering occurs from August to September, and the fruit is a flattened spherical drupe 2–3 mm (0.079–0.118 in) long.

== Taxonomy ==
This species was first formally described in 1868 by George Bentham who gave it the name Leucopogon durus in his Flora Australiensis. In 2005, Christopher John Quinn transferred the species to Acrotriche as A. dura in Australian Systematic Botany. The specific epithet (dura) means "hard", referring to the habit and leaves.

== Distribution and habitat ==
Acrotriche dura grows on loam over granite in valley slopes and road verges in the Esperance Plains bioregion of southern Western Australia.

== Conservation status ==
This species is listed as "Priority Four" by the Government of Western Australia Department of Biodiversity, Conservation and Attractions, meaning that it is rare or near threatened.
