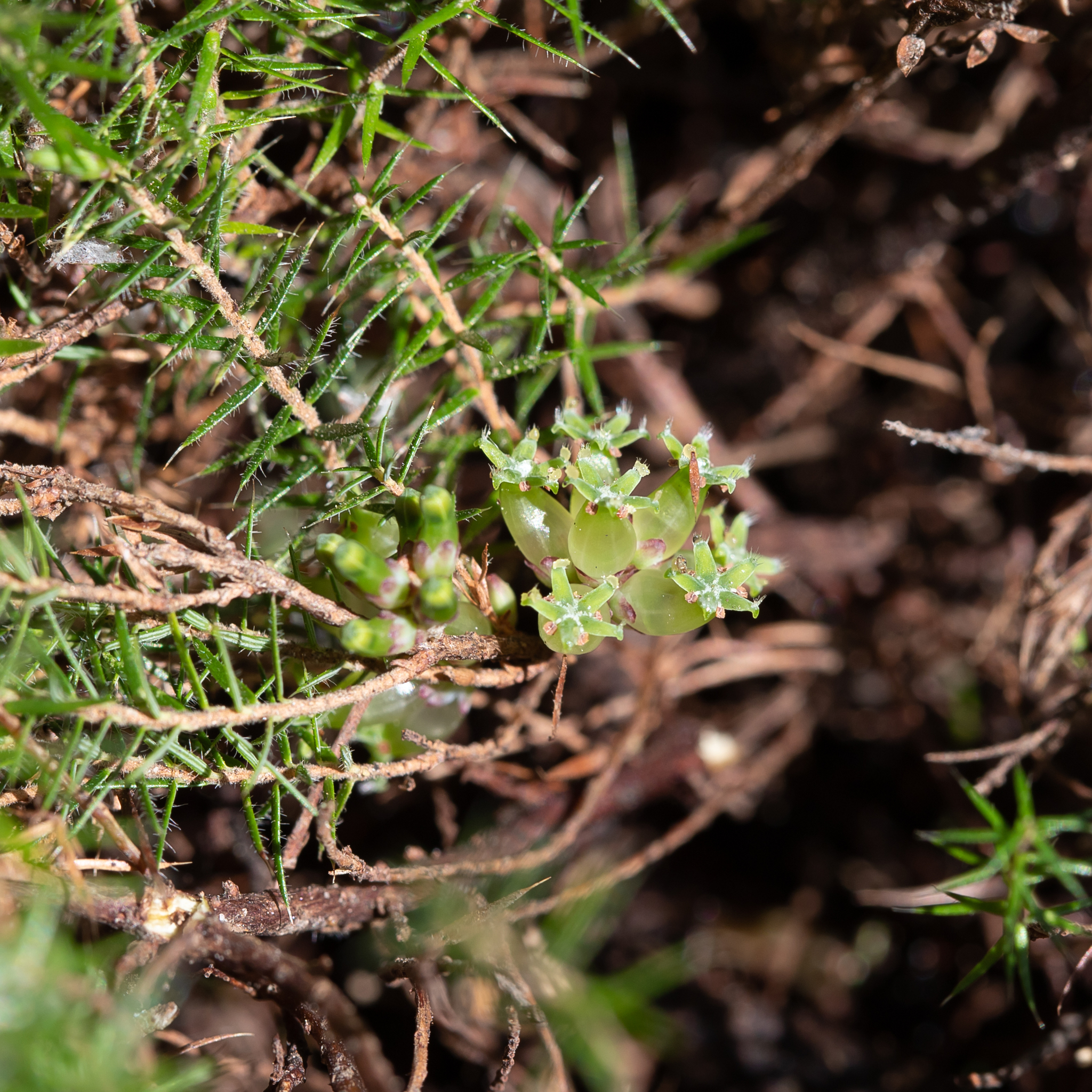
- In Kyeema Conservation Park

Scientific classification
- Kingdom: Plantae
- Clade: Tracheophytes
- Clade: Angiosperms
- Clade: Eudicots
- Clade: Asterids
- Order: Ericales
- Family: Ericaceae
- Genus: Acrotriche
- Species: A. serrulata

Binomial name
- Acrotriche serrulata R.Br.
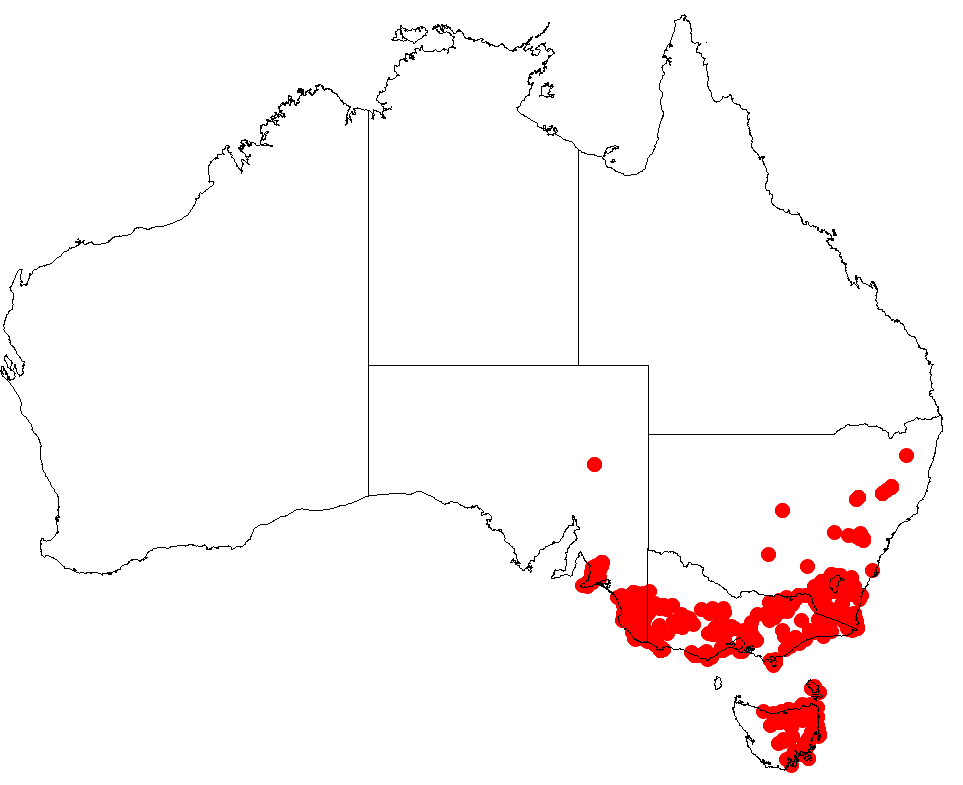
- Occurrence data from the Australasian Virtual Herbarium

= Acrotriche serrulata =

Species of plant

Acrotriche serrulata, commonly known as honey pots, is a species of flowering plant in the family Ericaceae, and is endemic to south-eastern Australia. It is a low-lying, mat-forming shrub with lance-shaped to linear leaves, pale green to whitish, cylindrical flowers and greyish-green fruit.

== Description ==
Acrotriche serrulata is a low-lying, matt-forming shrub that typically spreads to about 1 m (3 ft 3 in) wide, with ascending branches up to 15–60 cm (5.9–23.6 in) high. The leaves are lance-shaped to linear, 3.5–13.0 mm (0.14–0.51 in) long and 0.5–2.0 mm (0.020–0.079 in) wide on a petiole 0.3–0.7 mm (0.012–0.028 in) long with finely toothed edges and shallow grooves on the lower surface. The flowers are borne in spikes of 5 to 10 with bracteoles 1.0–1.5 mm (0.039–0.059 in) long at the base. The sepals are 1.4–2.8 mm (0.055–0.110 in) long and the petal are pale green or whitish and joined at the base, forming tube 4.0–4.7 mm (0.16–0.19 in) long with lobes 1.5–2.0 mm (0.059–0.079 in) long. Flowering occurs from August to September and the fruit is a flattened spherical capsule 2.5–4.5 mm (0.098–0.177 in) long and greyish-green.

== Taxonomy ==
Acrotriche serrulata was first formally described in 1810 by Robert Brown in his Prodromus Florae Novae Hollandiae et Insulae Van Diemen. The specific epithet (serrulata) means "like a small saw".

== Distribution and habitat ==
Honey pots is widely distributed in New South Wales, the Australian Capital Territory, Victoria and Tasmania, where it grows in woodland, forest, coastal heath and mallee shrubland.
