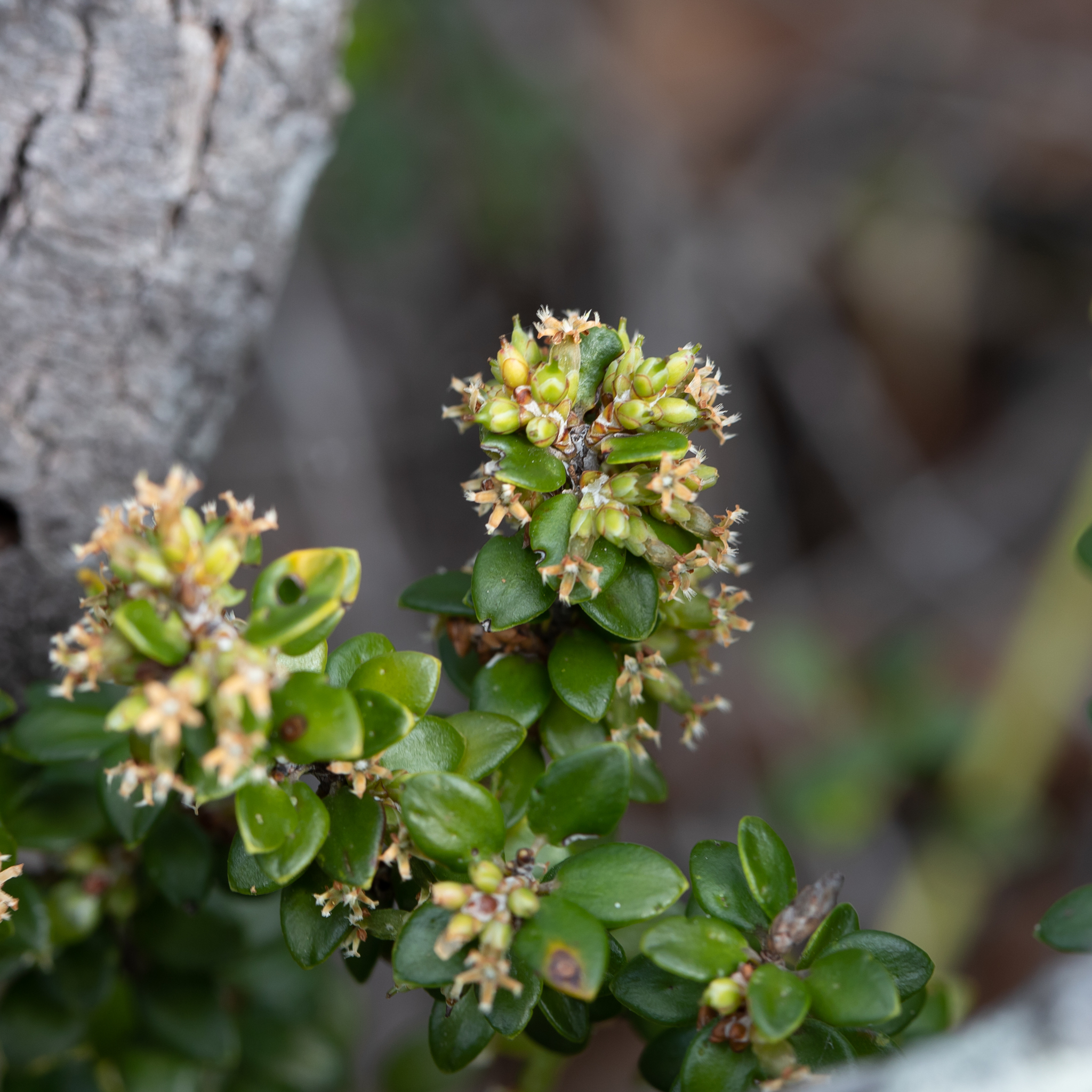
- Near Dhilba Guuranda–Innes National Park

Scientific classification
- Kingdom: Plantae
- Clade: Tracheophytes
- Clade: Angiosperms
- Clade: Eudicots
- Clade: Asterids
- Order: Ericales
- Family: Ericaceae
- Genus: Acrotriche
- Species: A. cordata

Binomial name
- Acrotriche cordata (Labill.)R.Br.
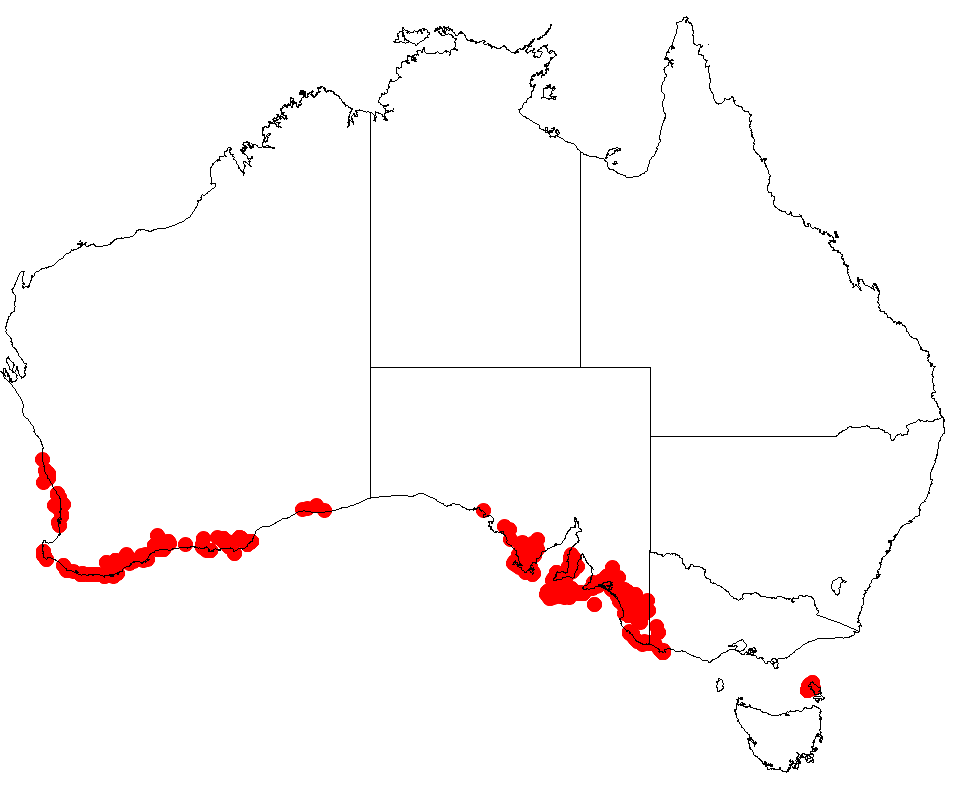
- Occurrence data from Australasian Virtual Herbarium

= Acrotriche cordata =

Species of plant

Acrotriche cordata, commonly known as coast ground-berry, is a species of flowering plant in the family Ericaceae and is endemic to southern Australia. It is an erect or spreading shrub, with linear, oblong or egg-shaped leaves, and spikes of tube-shaped, pale green, flowers, and succulent pale green drupes.

== Description ==
Acrotriche cordata is an erect or spreading shrub that typically grows to a height of about 50 cm (20 in) and has hairy branches. The leaves are linear, oblong or egg-shaped and sharply-pointed, 4–14 mm (0.16–0.55 in) long, 1.5–4 mm (0.059–0.157 in) wide and slightly paler with a few more or less parallel veins on the lower surface. The flowers are arranged in spikes of 3 to 8 with bracteoles 1.0–1.2 mm (0.039–0.047 in) long at the base of the sepals. The sepals are 1.4–1.9 mm (0.055–0.075 in) long, and the petals are joined at the base to form a pale green tube, 2.6–3.6 mm (0.10–0.14 in), with lobes 1.2–1.6 mm (0.047–0.063 in) long. Flowering occurs from July to October and the fruit is a flattened spherical, pale green drupe about 2–3 mm (0.079–0.118 in) long.

== Taxonomy ==
Acrotriche cordata was first formally described in 1805 by Jacques Labillardière who gave it the name Styphelia cordata in his Novae Hollandiae Plantarum Specimen. In 1810, Robert Brown transferred the species to Acrotriche as A. cordata in his Novae Hollandiae Plantarum Specimen. The specific epithet (cordata) means "heart-shaped", referring to the leaves.

== Distribution and habitat ==
Coast ground-berry grows on coastal or near-coastal limestone on cliffs and dunes in the Esperance Plains, Geraldton Sandplains, Hampton, Jarrah Forest, Mallee, Swan Coastal Plain and Warren of Western Australia and to the south-east of South Australia. It is restricted to a few sites in Victoria, where it is listed as "endangered" under the Victorian Government Flora and Fauna Guarantee Act 1988 and in the Furneaux Group Tasmania, where it is listed as "vulnerable" under the Tasmanian Government Threatened Species Protection Act 1995.
