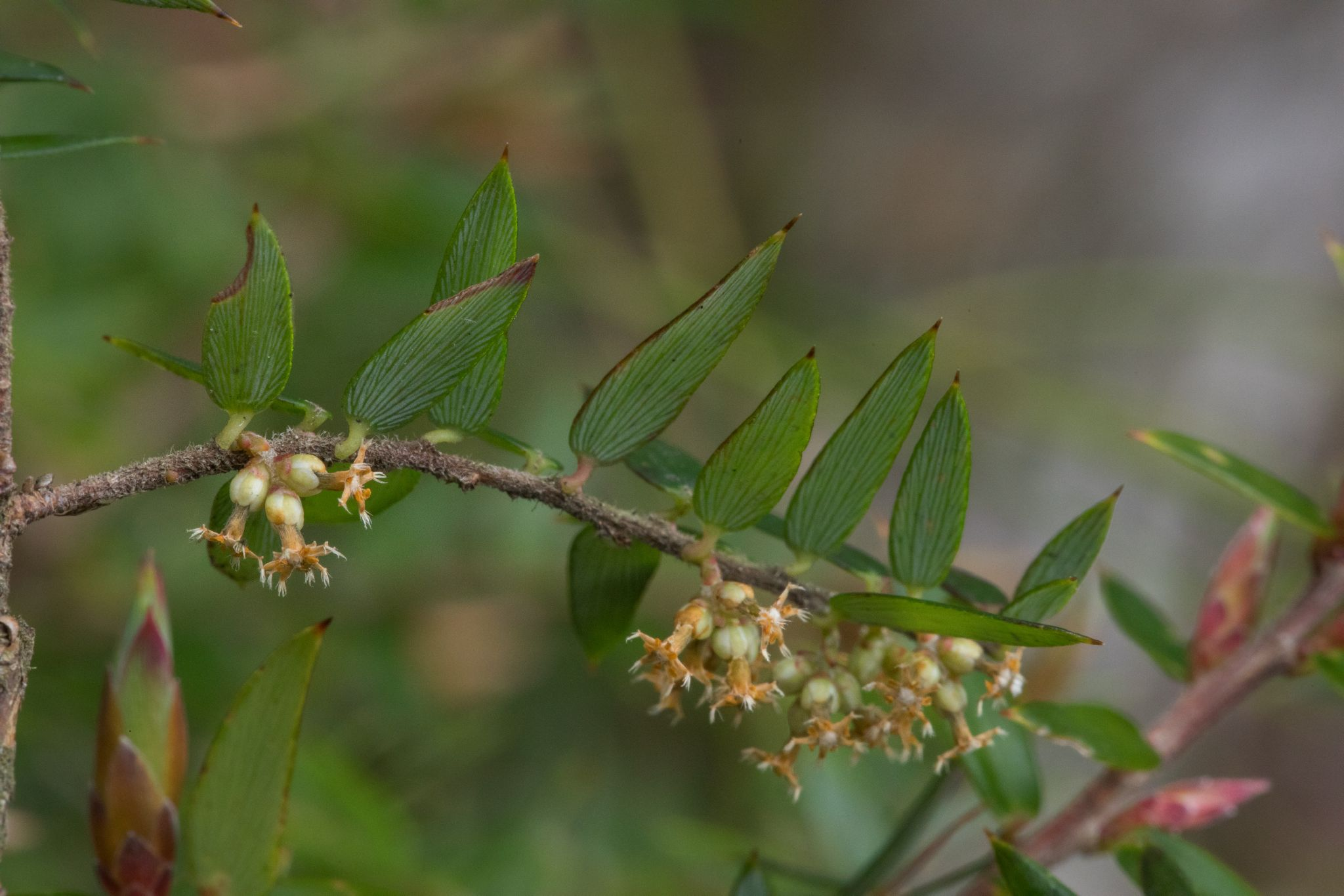
- On Mount Elizabeth

Scientific classification
- Kingdom: Plantae
- Clade: Tracheophytes
- Clade: Angiosperms
- Clade: Eudicots
- Clade: Asterids
- Order: Ericales
- Family: Ericaceae
- Genus: Acrotriche
- Species: A. leucocarpa

Binomial name
- Acrotriche leucocarpa Jobson & Whiffin
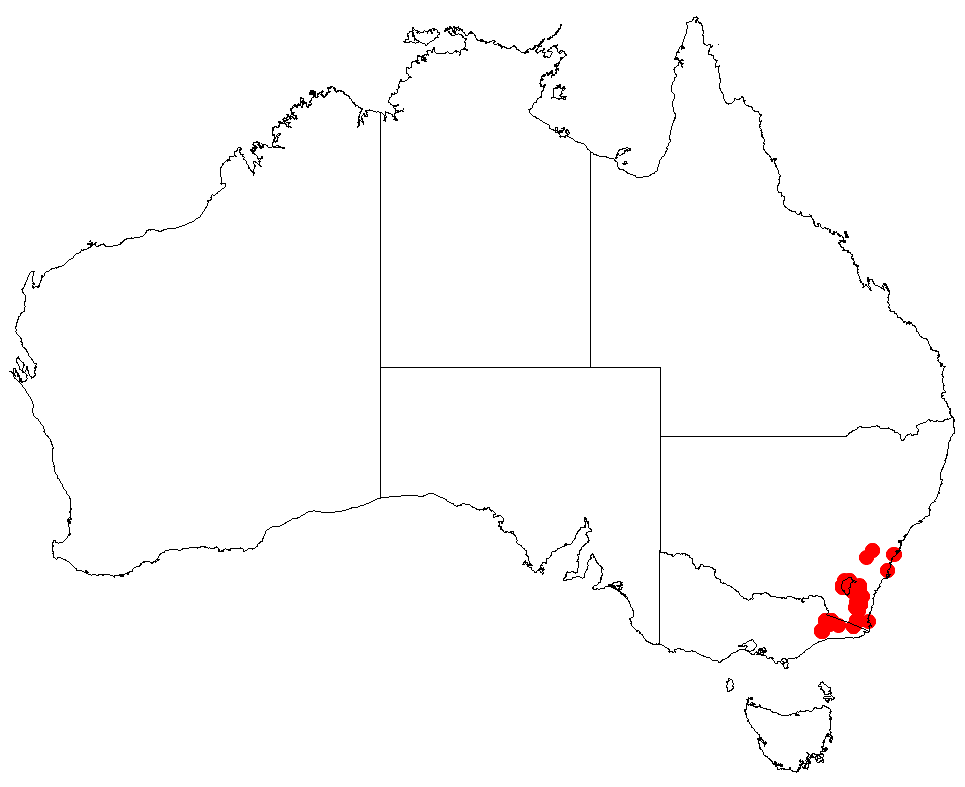
- Occurrence data from Australasian Virtual Herbarium

= Acrotriche leucocarpa =

Species of flowering plant

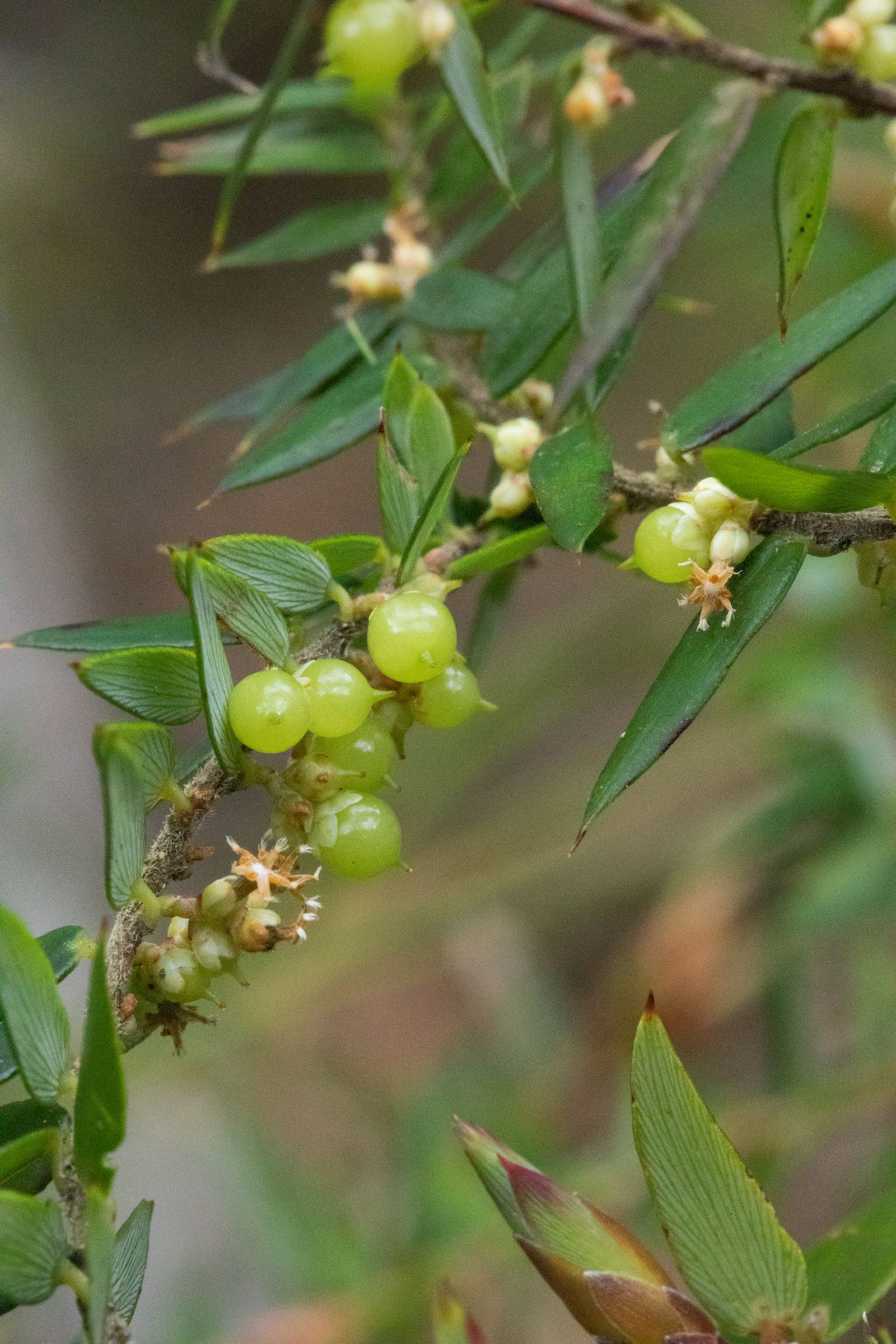
Immature fruit

Acrotriche leucocarpa is a species of flowering plant in the family Ericaceae and is endemic to south-eastern continental Australia. It is an erect, bushy shrub with sharply-pointed lance-shaped leaves and spikes of 3 to 5 green, tube-shaped flowers and spherical to oval, translucent white drupes.

== Description ==
Acrotriche leucocarpa is an erect, bushy shrub that typically grows to a height of 0.3–1.3 m (1 ft 0 in – 4 ft 3 in) and has many branches. Its leaves are usually lance-shaped, 5.5–14 mm (0.22–0.55 in) long, 1.5–3.5 mm (0.059–0.138 in) wide and sharply-pointed, on a petiole 0.5–1.0 mm (0.020–0.039 in) long. The upper leaf surface is dull green and the lower surface striated. The flowers are arranged in spikes with 3 to 6 flowers with keel-shaped bracteoles about 0.5 mm (0.020 in) long at the base of the sepals. The sepals are broadly egg-shaped, 1.25–1.6 mm (0.049–0.063 in) long and the petals green, sometimes with a reddish tinge on the tips, and joined at the base forming a tube 1.5–2.5 mm (0.059–0.098 in) long, the lobes 1.0–1.2 mm (0.039–0.047 in) long. Flowering occurs between May and October and the fruit is an oval or spherical, translucent, pearly white drupe 3–5 mm (0.12–0.20 in) in diameter.

== Taxonomy ==
Acrotriche divaricata was first formally described in 1990 by Peter Craig Jobson and Trevor Paul Whiffin in the journal Muelleria from specimens collected by Jobson near Big Badja Hill in 1988. The specific epithet (leucocarpa) means 'white fruit' and alludes to the characteristic white drupe of this species.

== Distribution and habitat ==
This species of Acrotriche grows in open woodland as an understorey shrub and occurs between the Tinderry Mountains in southern New South Wales, to near Mount Elizabeth in East Gippsland in Victoria.
