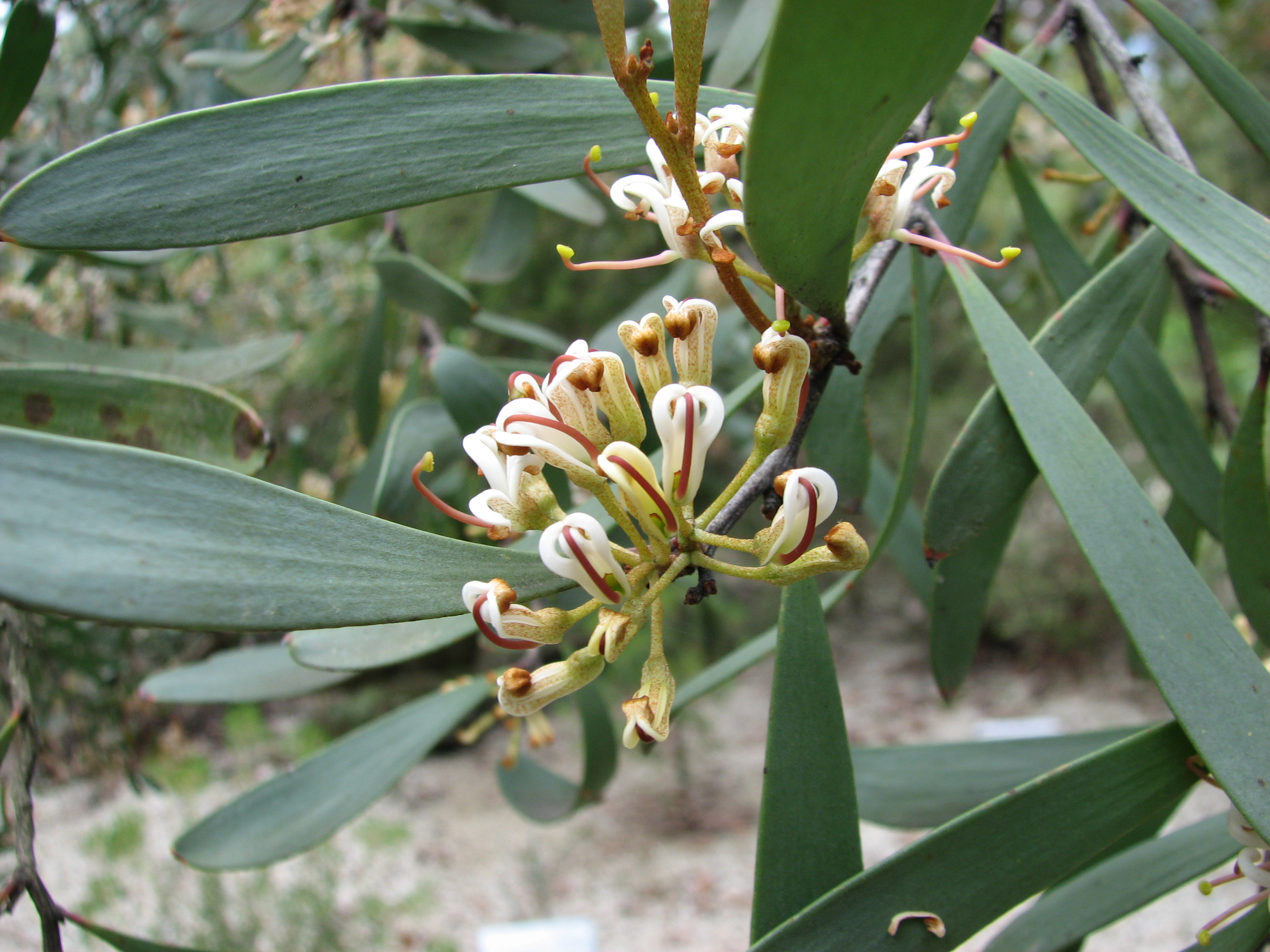
- In Maranoa Gardens

Scientific classification
- Kingdom: Plantae
- Clade: Tracheophytes
- Clade: Angiosperms
- Clade: Eudicots
- Order: Proteales
- Family: Proteaceae
- Genus: Hakea
- Species: H. pandanicarpa

Binomial name
- Hakea pandanicarpa R.Br.
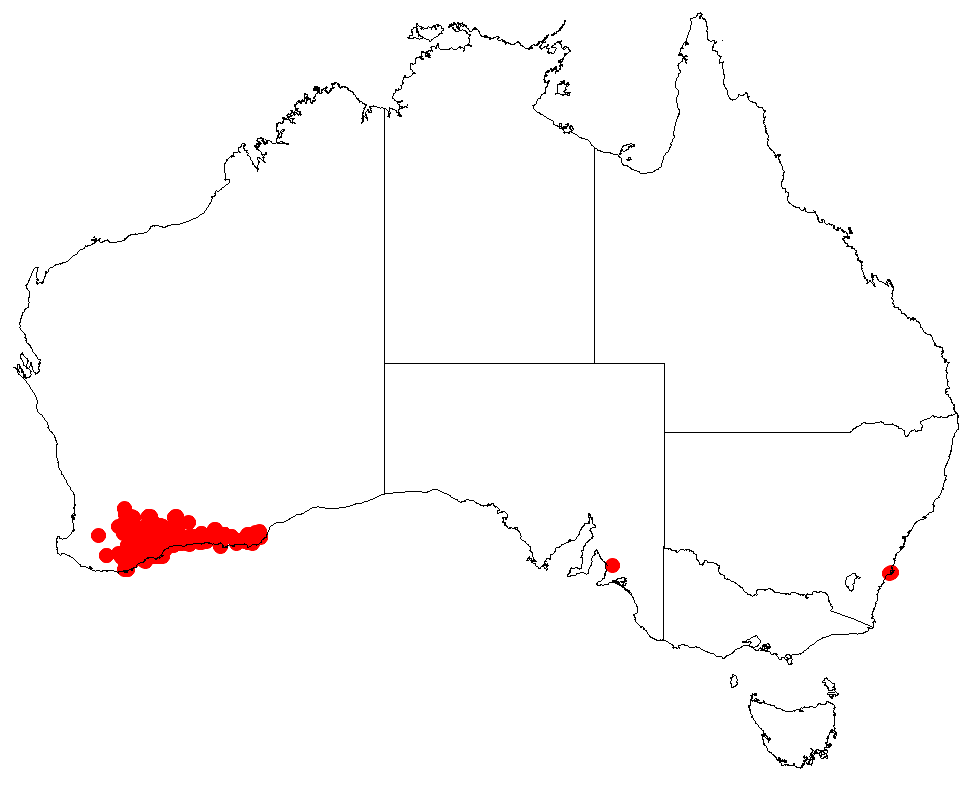
- Occurrence data from Australasian Virtual Herbarium

= Hakea pandanicarpa =

Species of shrub endemic to Western Australia

Hakea pandanicarpa is a shrub species in the family Proteaceae. It is endemic to south-west Western Australia.

== Description ==
Hakea pandanicarpa is a non-lignotuberous open erect shrub or small tree 1–4.5 m (3–10 ft) high. White-cream to greenish flowers appear on racemes with 4-14 flowers along the length of the stalk. Branchlets and young leaves are closely pressed to the stem and covered in short soft hairs. Single leaves are narrowly elliptic or egg-shaped 3–12 cm (1–5 in) long and 0.3–1.6 cm (0.1–0.6 in) wide with a short stalk at its base tapering to rounded at the apex ending in a hard blunt point. Fruit are obliquely egg-shaped 4.5–5.5 cm (2–2 in) long and 3.7–4.5 cm (1–2 in) wide with small uneven corky pyramid shaped protuberances on the surface.

== Taxonomy and naming ==
The species was first formally described in 1830 by botanist Robert Brown who observed the species growing between Cape Arid and Lucky Bay. Brown's description was published in Supplementum primum prodromi florae Novae Hollandiae. The specific epithet (pandanicarpa) means "Pandanus-fruited", referring to the warty fruit of this species.

Two subspecies are accepted by the Australian Plant Census:

- Hakea pandanicarpa subsp. crassifolia (Meisn.) R.M.Barker. Subspecies crassifolia can be identified by the fruit mainly having a smooth surface at a young age, becoming rougher as it ages but still comparatively smooth. The external pattern on the fruit of subsp. crassifolia resembles that of "drying mud in a clay pan". This subspecies grows from Corrigin to Albany and east to Ravensthorpe.
- Hakea pandanicarpa R.Br. subsp. pandanicarpa. Subspecies pandanicarpa has prominent raised corky pyramid-shaped projections on the fruit from a young age. Subspecies pandanicarpa has a more easterly distribution than subsp. crassifolia. It grows from the Fitzgerald River National Park east to Israelite Bay.

== Distribution and habitat ==
Hakea pandanicarpa grows from the Stirling Ranges to Israelite Bay on sand plain with low shrubland, heath and occasionally mallee.

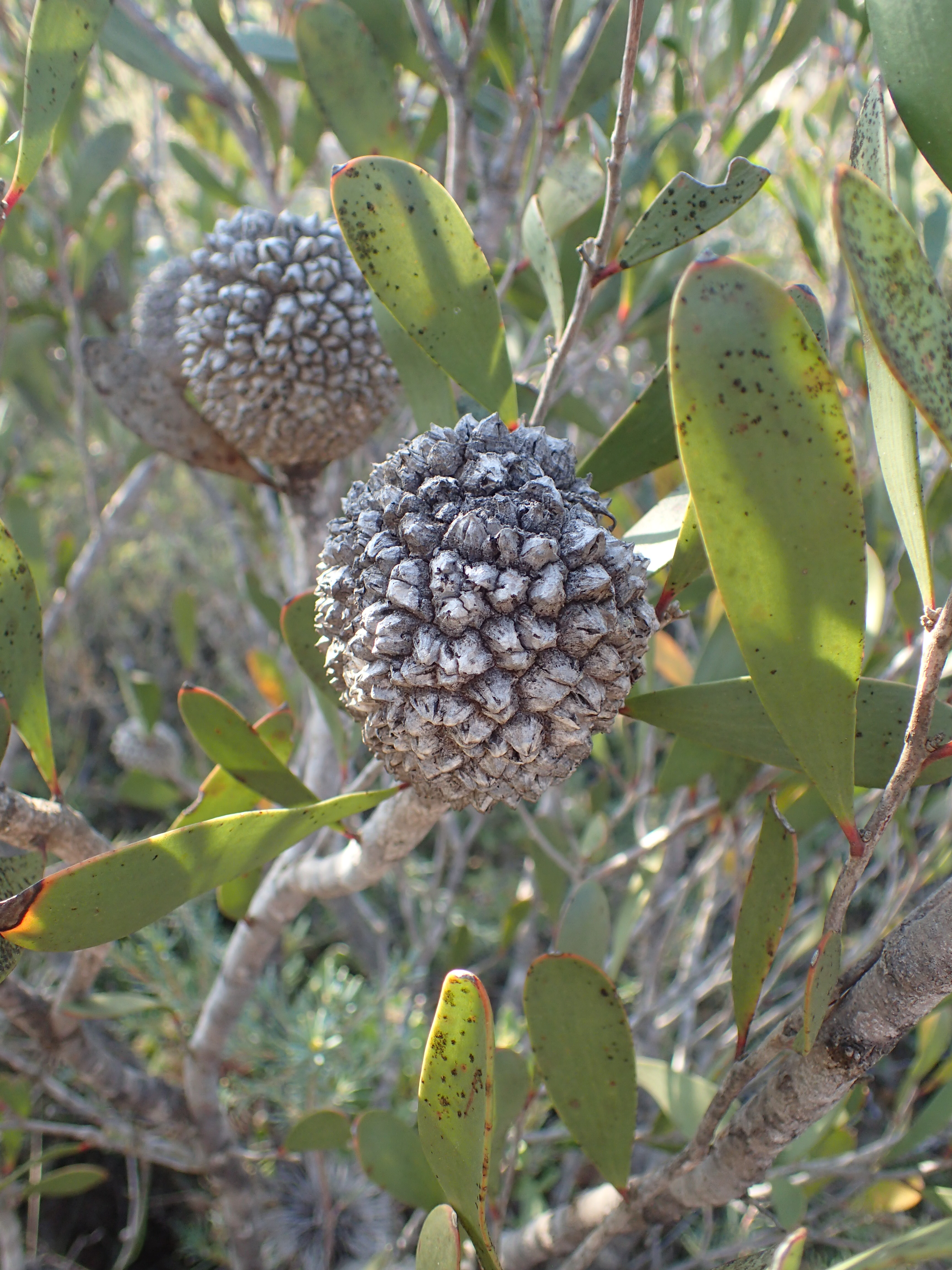
Fruit

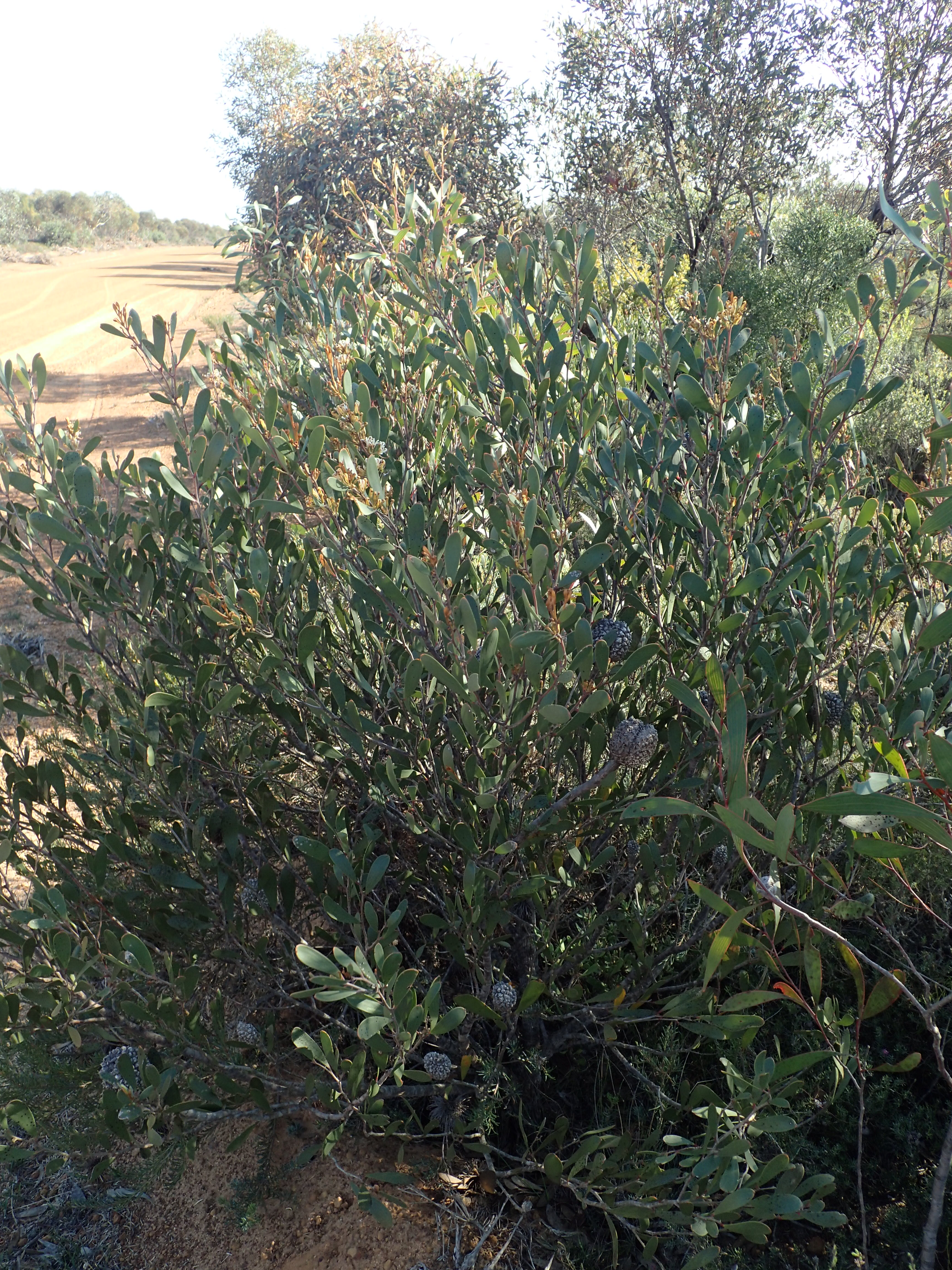
Habit near Ravensthorpe

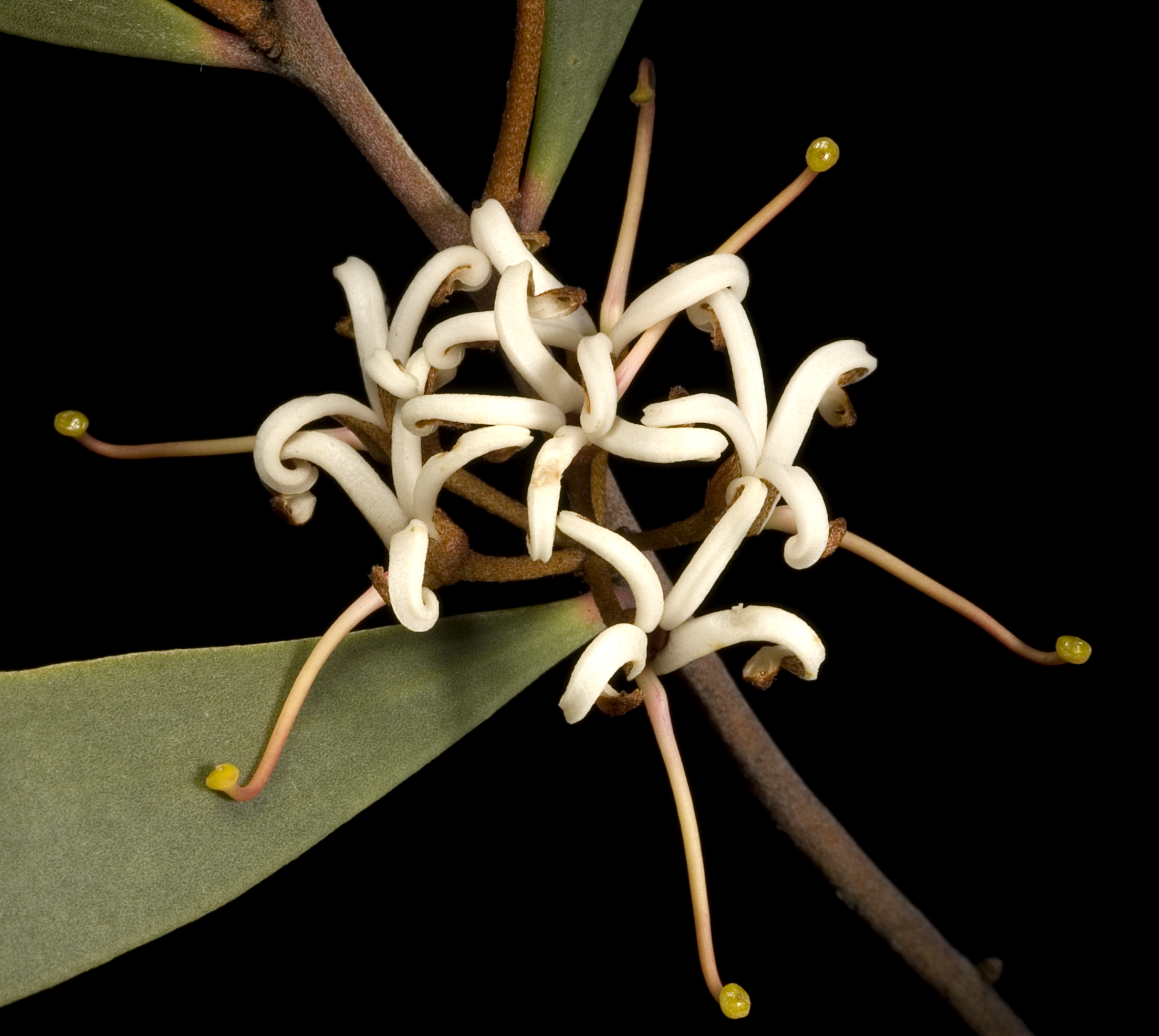
Flowers and leaves
