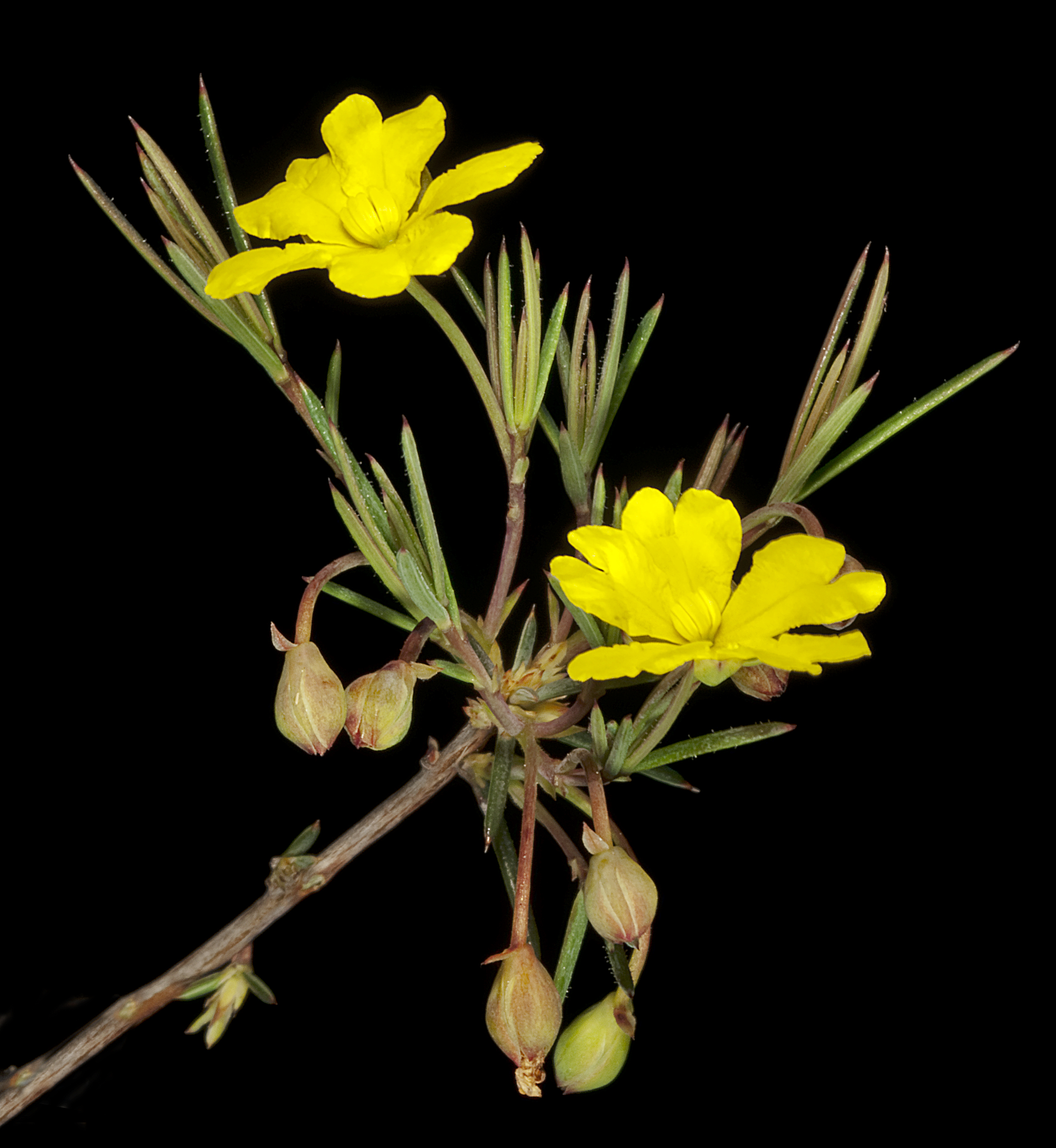

Scientific classification
- Kingdom: Plantae
- Clade: Tracheophytes
- Clade: Angiosperms
- Clade: Eudicots
- Order: Dilleniales
- Family: Dilleniaceae
- Genus: Hibbertia
- Species: H. acerosa

Binomial name
- Hibbertia acerosa (R.Br. ex DC.) Benth.

Synonyms
- Hibbertia acerosa (R.Br. ex DC.) Benth. var. acerosa; Pleurandra acerosa R.Br. ex DC.

= Hibbertia acerosa =

Needle leaved guinea flower

Species of flowering plant

Hibbertia acerosa, commonly known as needle leaved guinea flower, is a species of flowering plant in the family Dilleniaceae and is endemic to the south-west of Western Australia. It is a low, spreading or ascending shrub typically growing to a height of 10–60 cm (3.9–23.6 in) and has yellow flowers from July to December or from January to February.

Needle leaved guinea flower was first formally described in 1817 by de Candolle in Regni Vegetabilis Systema Naturale from an unpublished description by Robert Brown, and was given the name Pleurandra acerosa. Brown collected the type specimens near Lucky Bay. In 1863, George Bentham changed the name to Hibbertia acerosa in Flora Australiensis.

The species is endemic to the Wheatbelt, Peel, South West, Great Southern and coastal parts of the Mid West and Goldfields-Esperance regions of Western Australia where it grows in sandy or gravelly soils over or around granite or laterite.

== See also ==
- List of Hibbertia species
