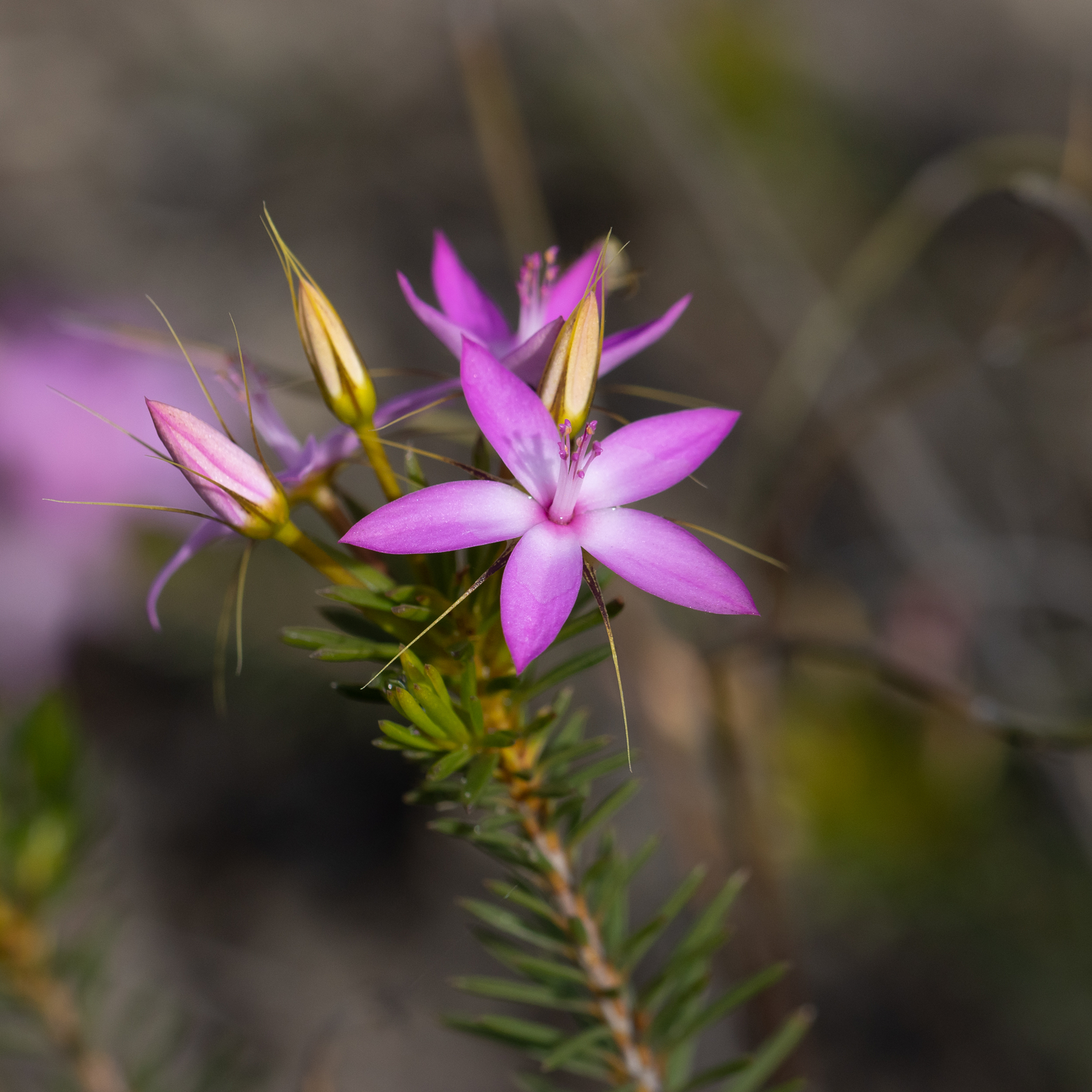
- Near Lucky Bay

Scientific classification
- Kingdom: Plantae
- Clade: Tracheophytes
- Clade: Angiosperms
- Clade: Eudicots
- Clade: Rosids
- Order: Myrtales
- Family: Myrtaceae
- Genus: Calytrix
- Species: C. decandra

Binomial name
- Calytrix decandra DC.

= Calytrix decandra =

Species of flowering plant

Calytrix decandra, commonly known as pink starflower, is a species of flowering plant in the myrtle family Myrtaceae and is endemic to the south of Western Australia. It is a semi-prostrate, glabrous shrub with linear to narrowly elliptic leaves and pink, mauve or magenta flowers with usually 10 stamens in a single row.

== Description ==
Calytrix decandra is a semi-prostrate, glabrous shrub that typically grows to a height of up to 10–70 cm (3.9–27.6 in). Its leaves are linear to narrowly elliptic, 4–11 mm (0.16–0.43 in) long and 0.8–1.75 mm (0.031–0.069 in) wide on a petiole 0.5–1.6 mm (0.020–0.063 in) long. There are stipules up to 0.5 mm (0.020 in) long at the base of the petioles. The flowers are borne on a peduncle 2–3 mm (0.079–0.118 in) long with lance-shaped or linear bracteoles 6–9 mm (0.24–0.35 in) long. The floral tube is 13–18 mm (0.51–0.71 in) long and has 10 ribs. The sepals are joined for a short distance at the base, the lobes more or less round or elliptic, 2.25–3.0 mm (0.089–0.118 in) long and 2.4–2.5 mm (0.094–0.098 in) wide with an awn up to 18 mm (0.71 in) long. The petals are pink, mauve or magenta, lance-shaped to narrowly elliptic, 9.5–15 mm (0.37–0.59 in) long and 2.75–4.75 mm (0.108–0.187 in) wide, usually with 10 stamens 3.5–9 mm (0.14–0.35 in) long. Flowering occurs from August to December.

== Taxonomy ==
Calytrix decandra was first formally described in 1828 by Augustin Pyramus de Candolle in his Prodromus Systematis Naturalis Regni Vegetabilis from specimens collected by Robert Brown. The specific epithet (decandra) means "ten males", referring to the ten stamens in each flower.

== Distribution and habitat ==
Pink starflower grows in heath with Banksia speciosa or in scrub between the Bremer Bay district to the Israelite Bay district in grey or white sand on sandplains and of granite outcrops in the Esperance Plains and Mallee bioregions of southern Western Australia.
