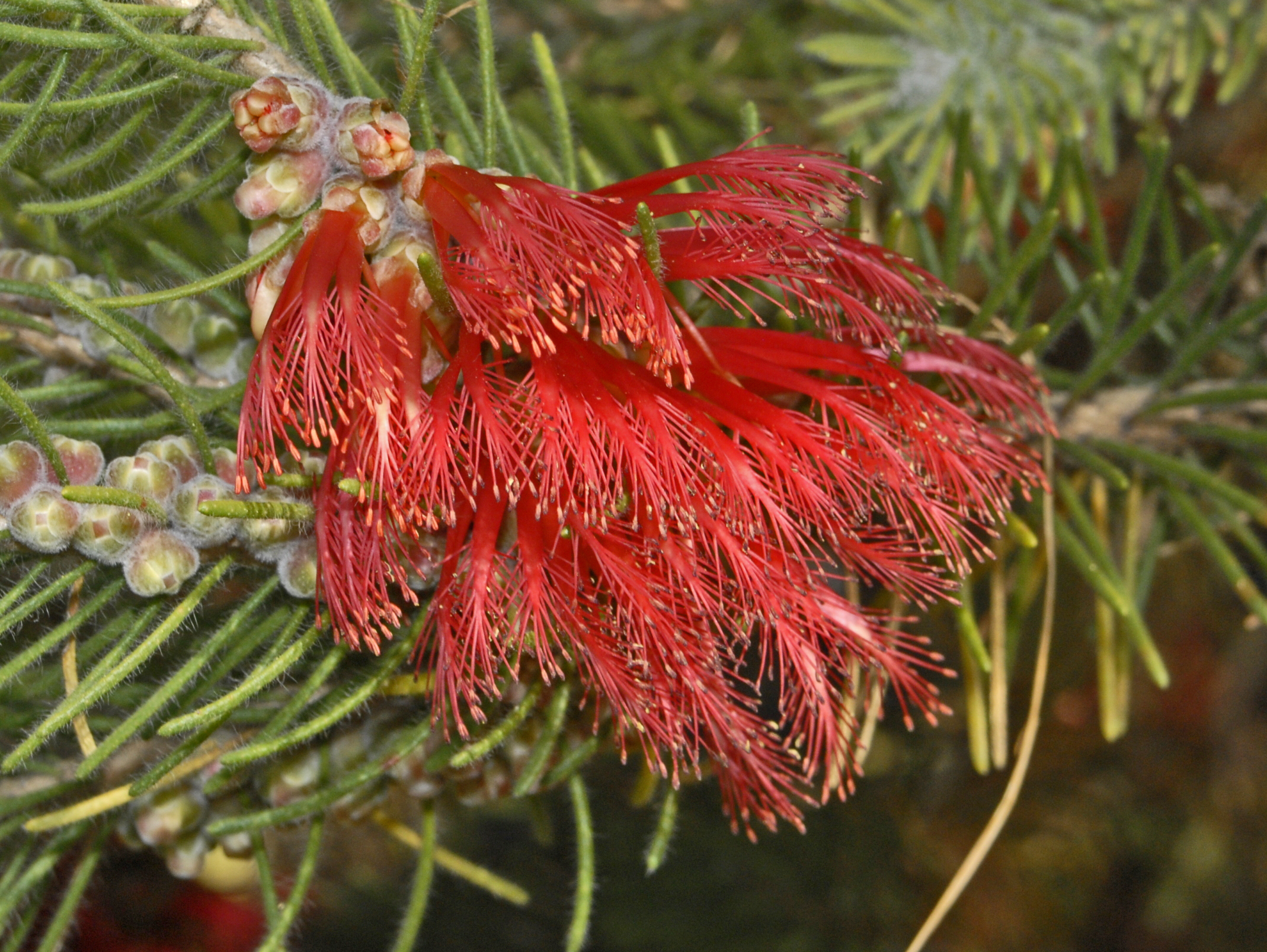
- At Villa Durazzo-Pallavicini

Scientific classification
- Kingdom: Plantae
- Clade: Tracheophytes
- Clade: Angiosperms
- Clade: Eudicots
- Clade: Rosids
- Order: Myrtales
- Family: Myrtaceae
- Genus: Calothamnus
- Species: C. villosus

Binomial name
- Calothamnus villosus R.Br.

Synonyms
- Calothamnus villosa Schauer orth. var.; Calothamnus villosus R.Br. var. villosus; Melaleuca hislopii Craven & R.D.Edwards

= Calothamnus villosus =

Species of flowering plant

Calothamnus villosus, commonly known as woolly net-bush or silky net-bush, is a plant in the myrtle family, Myrtaceae and is endemic to the south-west of Western Australia. It is a tall shrub, often forming thickets. It has thin, cylindrical leaves and blood red flowers for many months of the year. It is superficially similar to Calothamnus quadrifidus but can be distinguished from that species by its flowers which have five stamen claws compared to the four of C. quadrifidus.

== Description ==
Calothamnus villosus is an evergreen shrub sometimes growing to a height of 2 metres (7 ft). The leaves are arranged alternately, linear and needle-like.

The flowers are blood red and arranged in bottlebrush-like clusters about 30 millimetres (1 in) long on one side of the stem that was the new growth of the previous year. They have 5 sepals that are densely hairy on their outer surface. There are also 5 petals and 5 claw-like bundles of stamens which are at least 30 millimetres (1 in) long. Flowering occurs from March to December and is followed by fruits which are smooth, woody, approximately spherical capsules with two prominently thickened lobes at the top.

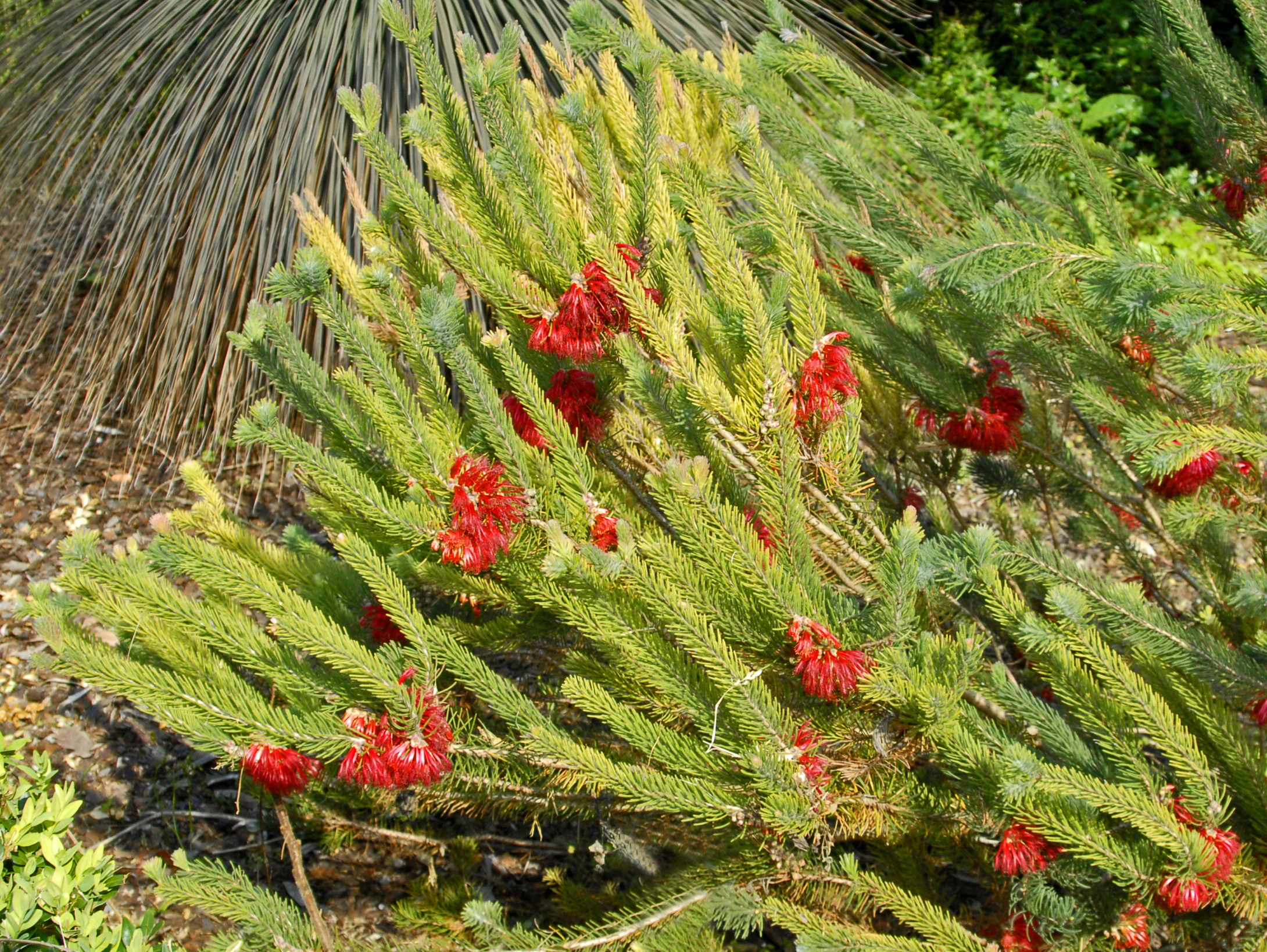
Foliage

== Taxonomy and naming ==
Calothamnus villosus was first formally described in 1812 by Robert Brown in William Aiton's Hortus Kewensis. The specific epithet (villosus) is a Latin word meaning "hairy".

== Distribution and habitat ==
Calothamnus villosus occurs from Albany to Esperance in the Esperance Plains and Mallee biogeographic regions. It is most common in the Cape Le Grand National Park and in the Mount Burdett Nature Reserve. It usually grows in thickets on sand, gravel or over granite.
