= Persoonia scabra =

Conservation status
- Priority Three — Poorly Known Taxa (DEC)

Scientific classification
- Kingdom: Plantae
- Clade: Tracheophytes
- Clade: Angiosperms
- Clade: Eudicots
- Order: Proteales
- Family: Proteaceae
- Genus: Persoonia
- Species: P. scabra

Binomial name
- Persoonia scabra R.Br.

Synonyms
- Linkia scabra (R.Br.) Kuntze

Species of flowering plant

Persoonia scabra is a species of flowering plant in the family Proteaceae and is endemic to the south-west of Western Australia. It is an erect to spreading shrub with hairy young branchlets, narrow oblong to lance-shaped leaves, and yellow flowers arranged singly, in pairs or threes, with a scale leaf at the base.

== Description ==
Persoonia scabra is an erect to spreading shrub that typically grows to a height of 0.3–0.9 m (1 ft 0 in – 2 ft 11 in) with smooth bark and young branchlets that are covered with greyish or whitish hair for the first three or four years. The leaves are narrow oblong to lance-shaped with the narrower end towards the base, 15–35 mm (0.59–1.38 in) long and 2.5–6 mm (0.098–0.236 in) wide, sometimes with a sharp point on the end. The flowers are arranged singly, in pairs or threes, on a pedicel 1.5–4.5 mm (0.059–0.177 in) long with a scale leaf at the base. The tepals are yellow, 6.5–10 mm (0.26–0.39 in) long, and the anthers are yellow. Flowering occurs from November to January and the fruit is a smooth, elliptic drupe 8–9.5 mm (0.31–0.37 in) long and 4.5–5 mm (0.18–0.20 in) wide.

== Taxonomy ==
Persoonia prostrata was first formally described in 1810 by Robert Brown in Transactions of the Linnean Society of London from specimens he collected at Lucky Bay.

== Distribution and habitat ==
This geebung grows in open scrub mallee in the area between Frank Hann National Park, Mount Buraminya and Cape Le Grand in the south-west of Western Australia.

== Conservation status ==
Persoonia scabra is classified as "Priority Three" by the Government of Western Australia Department of Parks and Wildlife meaning that it is poorly known and known from only a few locations but is not under imminent threat.
