= Persoonia spathulata =

Conservation status
- Priority Two — Poorly Known Taxa (DEC)

Scientific classification
- Kingdom: Plantae
- Clade: Tracheophytes
- Clade: Angiosperms
- Clade: Eudicots
- Order: Proteales
- Family: Proteaceae
- Genus: Persoonia
- Species: P. spathulata

Binomial name
- Persoonia spathulata R.Br.

Species of shrub plant

Persoonia spathulata is a species of flowering plant in the family Proteaceae and is endemic to the south-west of Western Australia. It is an erect to spreading shrub with hairy young branchlets, spatula-shaped leaves, and yellow flowers arranged singly or in pairs on a rachis up to 2 mm (0.079 in) long that continues to grow after flowering.

== Description ==
Persoonia spathulata is an erect to spreading shrub that typically grows to a height of 0.3–0.9 m (1 ft 0 in – 2 ft 11 in) with smooth bark and young branchlets that are covered with both brown glandular hairs and greyish non-glandular hairs. The leaves are mostly spatula-shaped, 15–38 mm (0.59–1.50 in) long and 5–10 mm (0.20–0.39 in) wide and twisted at the base. The flowers are arranged singly or in pairs on a rachis up to 2 mm (0.079 in) long, each flower on a pedicel 3.5–9 mm (0.14–0.35 in) long with a leaf or scale leaf at the base. The tepals are yellow, 9–13 mm (0.35–0.51 in) long, and the anthers are yellow. Flowering occurs from December to January and the fruit is a smooth drupe.

== Taxonomy ==
Persoonia spathulata was first formally described in 1810 by Robert Brown in Transactions of the Linnean Society of London from specimens he collected at Lucky Bay.

== Distribution and habitat ==
This geebung grows in heath in the area between Dingo Rock, Cape Le Grand and Israelite Bay in the south-west of Western Australia.

== Conservation status ==
Persoonia spathulata is classified as "Priority Two" by the Western Australian Government Department of Parks and Wildlife, meaning that it is poorly known and from only one or a few locations.
