= Calothamnus quadrifidus subsp. obtusus =

Scientific classification
- Kingdom: Plantae
- Clade: Tracheophytes
- Clade: Angiosperms
- Clade: Eudicots
- Clade: Rosids
- Order: Myrtales
- Family: Myrtaceae
- Genus: Calothamnus
- Species: C. quadrifidus
- Subspecies: C. q. subsp. obtusus

Trinomial name
- Calothamnus quadrifidus subsp. obtusus (Benth.) A.S.George & N.Gibson

Synonyms
- Melaleuca quadrifida subsp. obtusa (Benth.) Craven & R.D.Edwards

Subspecies of flowering plant

Calothamnus quadrifidus subsp. obtusus is a plant in the myrtle family, Myrtaceae and is endemic to the south-west of Western Australia. It is similar to other subspecies of Calothamnus quadrifidus except that its leaves are linear and somewhat rough and scaly and the stamen bundles are relatively short.

== Description ==
Calothamnus quadrifidus subsp. obtusus is an erect or straggly shrub which sometimes grows to a height of 3 metres (10 ft) and has a lignotuber. Its leaves are flat and linear with the outer part slightly expanded, 10–35 millimetres (0.4–1 in) long and 1–4 millimetres (0.04–0.2 in) wide.

The flowers are red and arranged in clusters, usually on one side of the stem amongst the older leaves. The stamens are arranged in 4 claw-like bundles, each about 18–25 millimetres (0.7–1 in) long. Flowering mainly occurs from August to October and is followed by fruits which are woody, roughly spherical capsules, 6–10 millimetres (0.2–0.4 in) long. (The subspecies petraeus and seminudus have similar leaves to obtusus but their stamen bundles are longer.)

== Taxonomy and naming ==
Calothamnus quadrifidus subsp. obtusus was first formally described in 2010 by Alex George in Nuytsia. It had originally been described in 1867 by George Bentham as a form of Calothamnus quadrifidus (Calothamnus quadrifidus f. obtusus) from a specimen collected on the Murchison River by Augustus Oldfield. The epithet obtusus is a Latin word meaning "blunt" or "dull".

== Distribution and habitat ==
Calothamnus quadrifidus subsp. obtusus is found between Shark Bay, Kalbarri and Mullewa in the Carnarvon, Geraldton Sandplains and Yalgoo biogeographic regions. It usually grows in sand in kwongan.

== Conservation ==
Calothamnus quadrifidus subsp. obtusus is classified as "not threatened" by the Western Australian Government Department of Parks and Wildlife.
