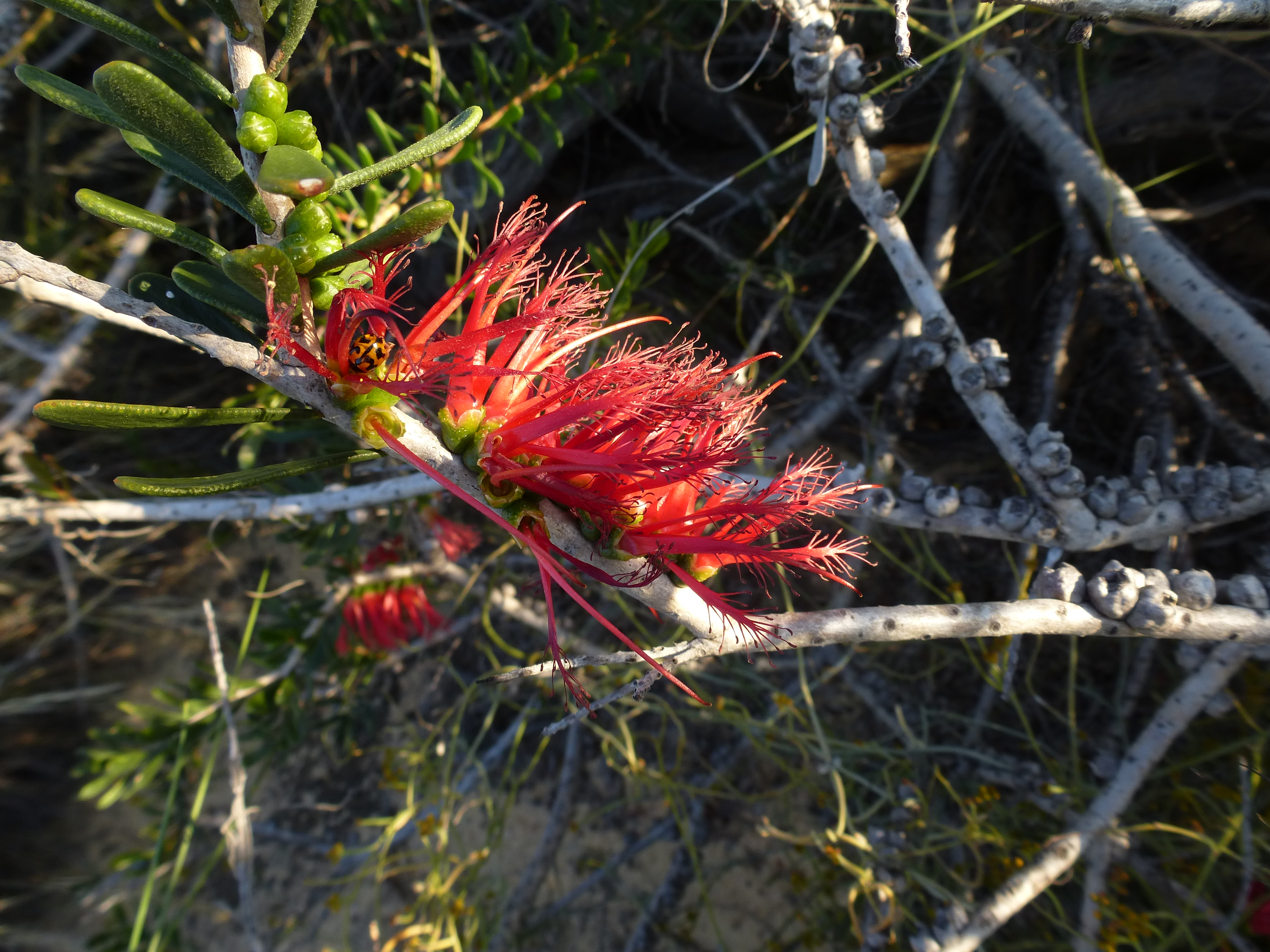
- Calothamnus quadrifidus homalophyllus growing near the Red Bluff car park, Kalbarri

Scientific classification
- Kingdom: Plantae
- Clade: Tracheophytes
- Clade: Angiosperms
- Clade: Eudicots
- Clade: Rosids
- Order: Myrtales
- Family: Myrtaceae
- Genus: Calothamnus
- Species: C. quadrifidus
- Subspecies: C. q. subsp. homalophyllus

Trinomial name
- Calothamnus quadrifidus subsp. homalophyllus (F.Muell.) A.S.George & N.Gibson

Synonyms
- Melaleuca quadrifida subsp. homalophylla (F.Muell.) Craven & R.D.Edwards

= Calothamnus quadrifidus subsp. homalophyllus =

Subspecies of flowering plant

Calothamnus quadrifidus subsp. homalophyllus is a plant in the myrtle family, Myrtaceae and is endemic to the south-west of Western Australia. It is similar to other subspecies of Calothamnus quadrifidus except that its leaves are longer and wider.

== Description ==
Calothamnus quadrifidus subsp. homalophyllus is an erect or spreading shrub which sometimes grows to a height of 5 metres (20 ft) and lacks a lignotuber. Its leaves are flat, egg-shaped with the narrow end towards the base, 30–50 millimetres (1–2 in) long and 5–10 millimetres (0.2–0.4 in) wide.

The flowers are red and arranged in clusters, usually on one side of the stem amongst the older leaves. The stamens are arranged in 4 claw-like bundles, each about 27–32 millimetres (1.1–1.3 in) long. Flowering mainly occurs from August to November and is followed by fruits which are woody, roughly spherical capsules, 6–8 millimetres (0.2–0.3 in) long.(Calothamnus quadrifidus subsp. angustifolius also has long leaves but they are narrower than those of subspecies homalophyllus.)

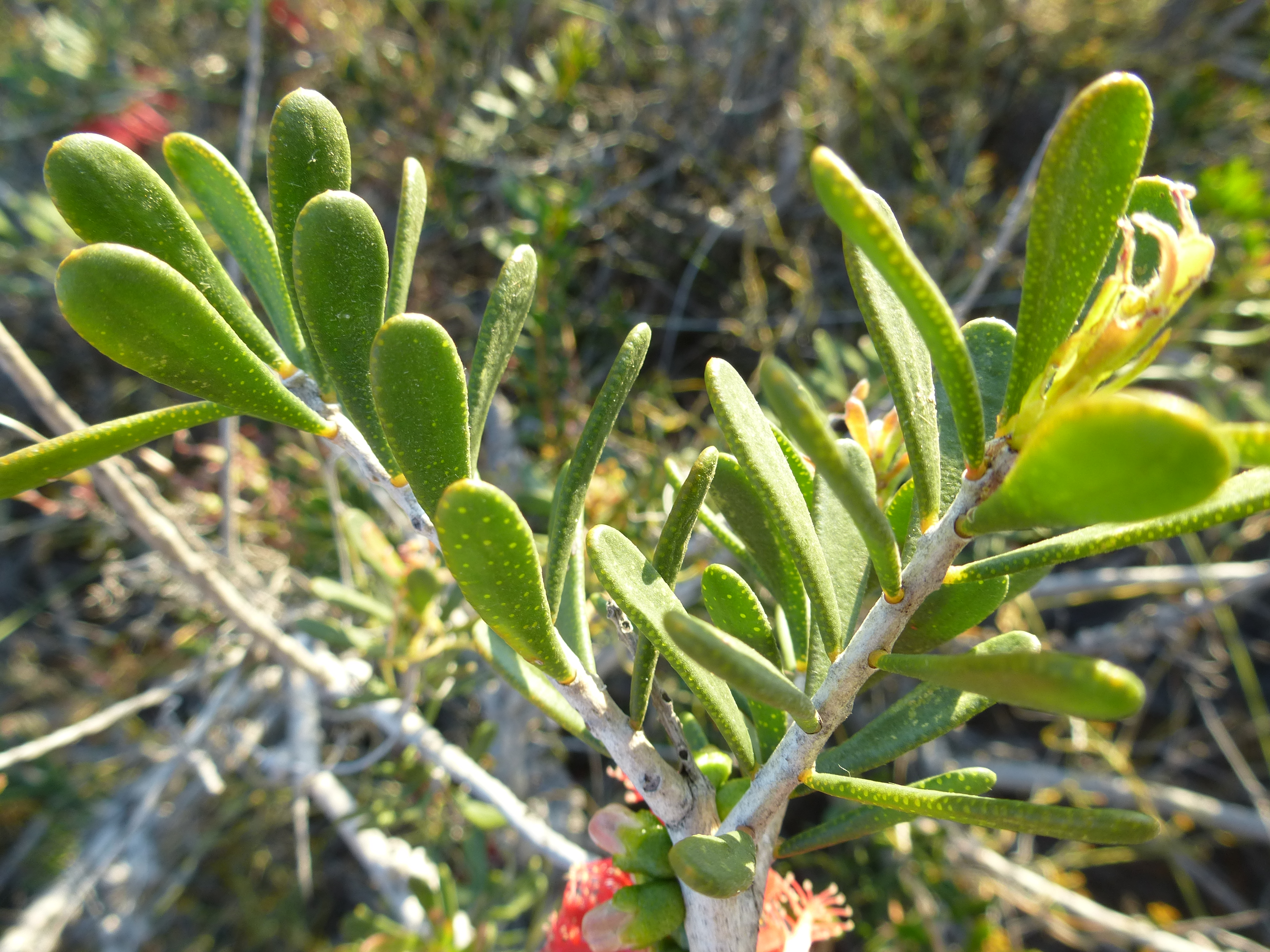
leaves

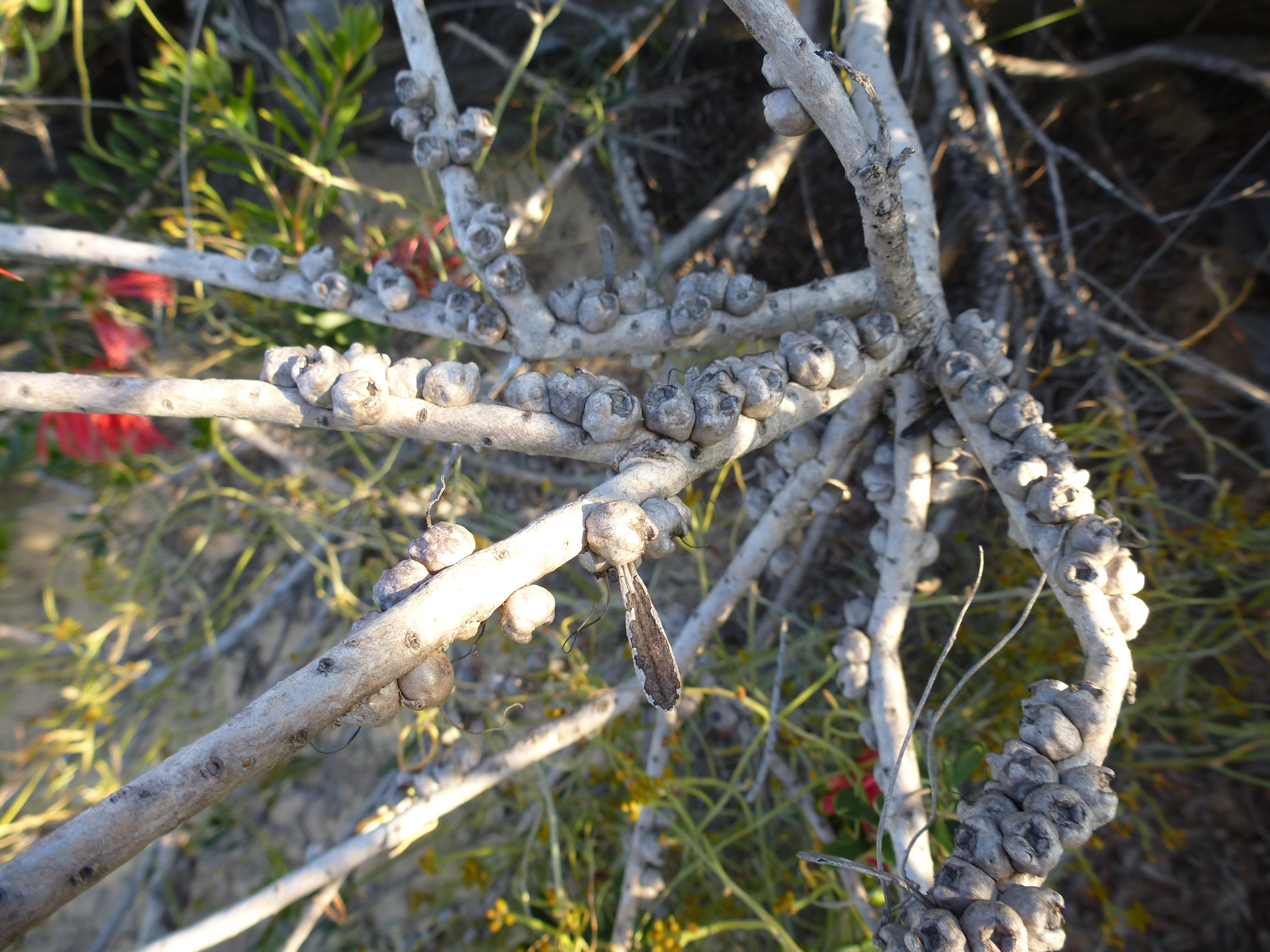
fruit

== Taxonomy and naming ==
Calothamnus quadrifidus subsp. homalophyllus was first formally described in 2010 by Alex George in Nuytsia. It had originally been described in 1849 by Ferdinand von Mueller as Calothamnus homalophyllus from a specimen collected near Red Bluff on the Murchison River.

== Distribution and habitat ==
Calothamnus quadrifidus subsp. homalophyllus is found between Mingenew, the lower Murchison River and Eurardy Reserve in the Geraldton Sandplains, Jarrah Forest and Swan Coastal Plain biogeographic regions.

== Conservation ==
Calothamnus quadrifidus subsp. homalophyllus is classified as "not threatened" by the Western Australian Government Department of Parks and Wildlife.
