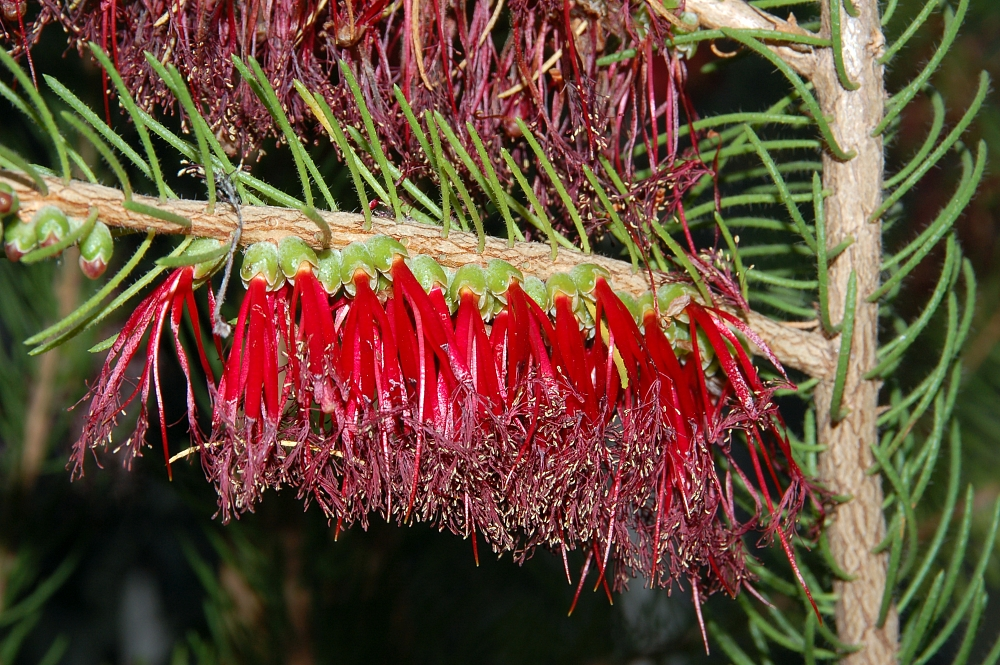

Scientific classification
- Kingdom: Plantae
- Clade: Embryophytes
- Clade: Tracheophytes
- Clade: Spermatophytes
- Clade: Angiosperms
- Clade: Eudicots
- Clade: Rosids
- Order: Myrtales
- Family: Myrtaceae
- Genus: Calothamnus
- Species: C. quadrifidus

Binomial name
- Calothamnus quadrifidus R.Br.

Synonyms
- Melaleuca quadrifida (R.Br.) Craven & R.D.Edwards

= Calothamnus quadrifidus =

One-sided bottlebrush

Species of flowering plant

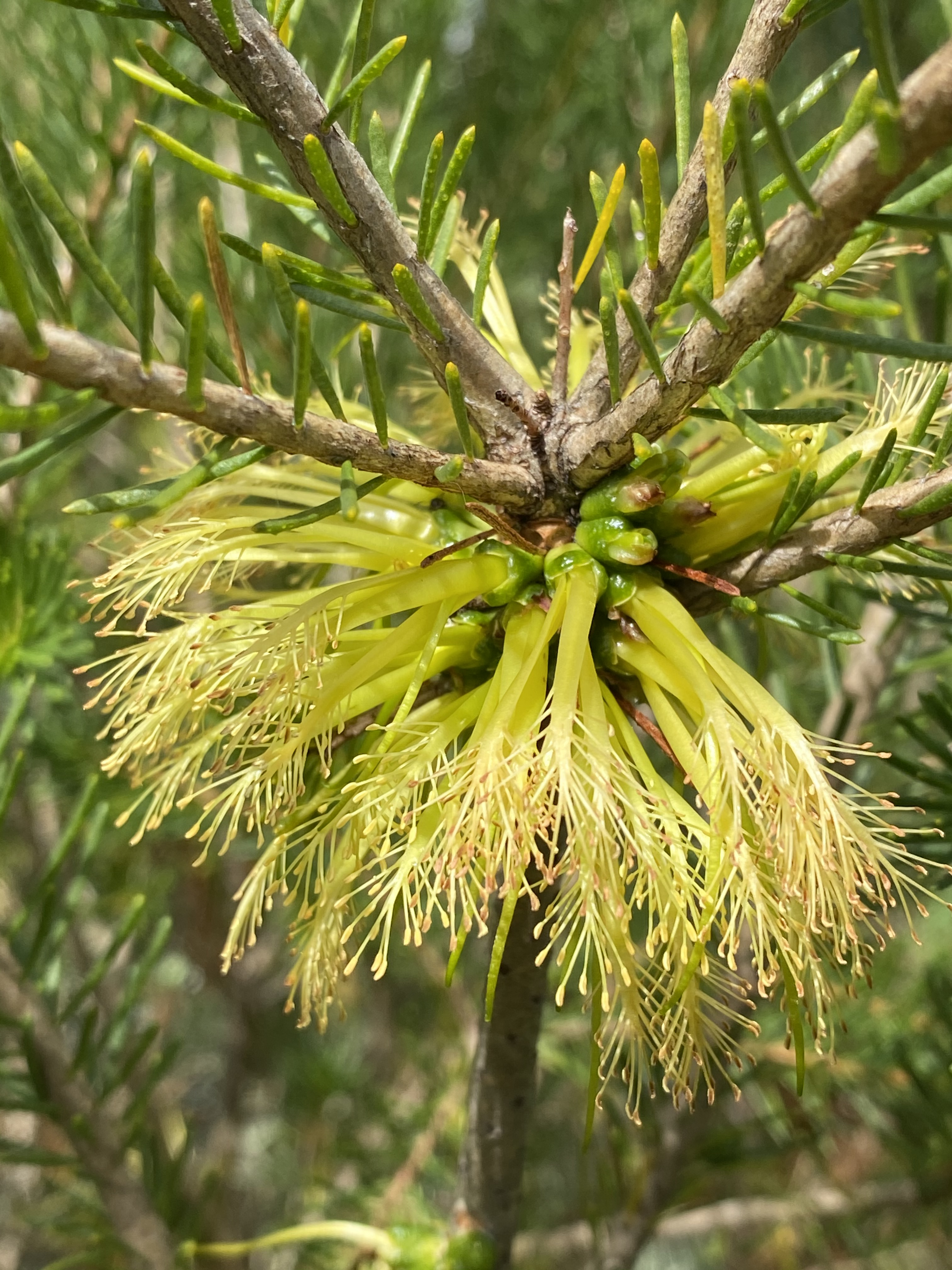
Yellow form

Calothamnus quadrifidus, commonly known as one-sided bottlebrush, is a plant in the myrtle family, Myrtaceae and is endemic to the south-west of Western Australia. The common name alludes to the arrangement of the flowers in the inflorescence which line up on one side of the stem. It is a shrub with grey-green, pine-like foliage covered with soft hairs and red, four-part flowers in spring. Widely cultivated because of its attractive foliage, colourful, unusual and prolific flowers, it grows in a variety of habitats and soils. In 2010, Alex George published a review of the species based on recent research and described a number of new subspecies. (In 2014 Craven, Edwards and Cowley proposed that the species be renamed Melaleuca quadrifida.)

== Description ==
Calothamnus quadrifidus is a shrub which sometimes grows to a height of 5 metres (20 ft) although usually much less and it sometimes has a lignotuber. Its leaves are variable, depending on subspecies, but usually 10–50 millimetres (0.4–2 in) long and 0.8–10 millimetres (0.03–0.4 in) wide, sometimes circular in cross section but in some subspecies flat.

The flowers are usually red, although there are white and yellow forms, with the red flowered form most commonly seen in cultivation. The flowers are arranged in clusters, usually on one side of the stem amongst the older leaves. There are four petals, each 3.5–4 millimetres (0.1–0.2 in) long which fall off soon after the flower opens. The stamens are arranged in 4 claw-like bundles, all about the same length. In most subspecies, flowering occurs in spring. Flowering is followed by fruits which are woody, barrel-shaped capsules, 6–14 millimetres (0.24–0.55 in) long.

== Taxonomy and naming ==
Calothamnus quadrifidus was first formally described in 1812 by Robert Brown from a specimen he collected at Lucky Bay near Esperance during the Investigator expedition with Matthew Flinders. The description was published in Curtis's Botanical Magazine (edited by John Sims).

The subspecies described by Alex George and recognised by the Western Australian Herbarium are:

- Calothamnus quadrifidus subsp. angustifolius (Ewart) A.S.George & N.Gibson has flat leaves that are longer than 40 millimetres (2 in) and narrower than 4 millimetres (0.2 in);
- Calothamnus quadrifidus subsp. asper (Turcz.) A.S.George & N.Gibson has flat leaves that are shorter than 30 millimetres (1 in) and are distinctly rough and scaly;
- Calothamnus quadrifidus subsp. homalophyllus (F.Muell.) A.S.George & N.Gibson has flat leaves that are longer than 40 millimetres (2 in) and wider than 4 millimetres (0.2 in);
- Calothamnus quadrifidus subsp. obtusus (Benth.) A.S.George & N.Gibson has flat leaves which are somewhat rough and scaly and stamen bundles less than 21 millimetres (0.8 in) long;
- Calothamnus quadrifidus subsp. petraeus A.S.George & N.Gibson has flat leaves which are somewhat rough and scaly, stamen bundles more than 24 millimetres (0.9 in) long and fruit 10–11 millimetres (0.39–0.43 in) long;
- Calothamnus quadrifidus R.Br subsp. quadrifidus has cylindrical, usually hairy leaves and a hairy hypanthium;
- Calothamnus quadrifidus subsp. seminudus A.S.George & N.Gibson has flat leaves which are somewhat rough and scaly, stamen bundles more than 24 millimetres (0.9 in) long and fruit 8–9 millimetres (0.3–0.4 in) long;
- Calothamnus quadrifidus subsp. teretifolius A.S.George & N.Gibson has cylindrical, glabrous leaves and a glabrous hypanthium;

== Distribution and habitat ==
Calothamnus quadrifidus is common and widespread in the Eremaean and South-West botanical provinces, occurring in a wide range of habitats and growing in a range of soils.

== Ecology ==
Research on the competition between honeybees (Apis mellifera) and honeyeaters (especially the Brown honeyeater and White-cheeked honeyeater) for the nectar of Calothamnus quadrifidus has shown that honeyeaters consume more nectar early in the day. Honeybees, because of their much greater numbers consume a larger volume of nectar but nevertheless, honeyeaters were the more important in pollen dispersal.

== Conservation status ==
Calothamnus quadrifidus is classified as not threatened by the Western Australian Government Department of Parks and Wildlife but subspecies asper is listed as priority two meaning that it is poorly known and from only one or a few locations. Subspecies teretifolius is listed as priority four by the Government of Western Australia Department of Parks and Wildlife, meaning that is rare or near threatened.

== Uses ==
=== Horticulture ===
Calothamnus quadrifidus is probably the best known of the genus in cultivation. It has attractive foliage, colourful flowers over a long period, is frost hardy and drought tolerant when well established. It is attractive to honey-eating birds and although it can become woody with age, it responds well to pruning.

=== Phytotherapeutic studies ===
This species has been used in phytotherapeutic studies and its aerial parts have been found to contain phenolic acids and flavonoids.

== Gallery ==
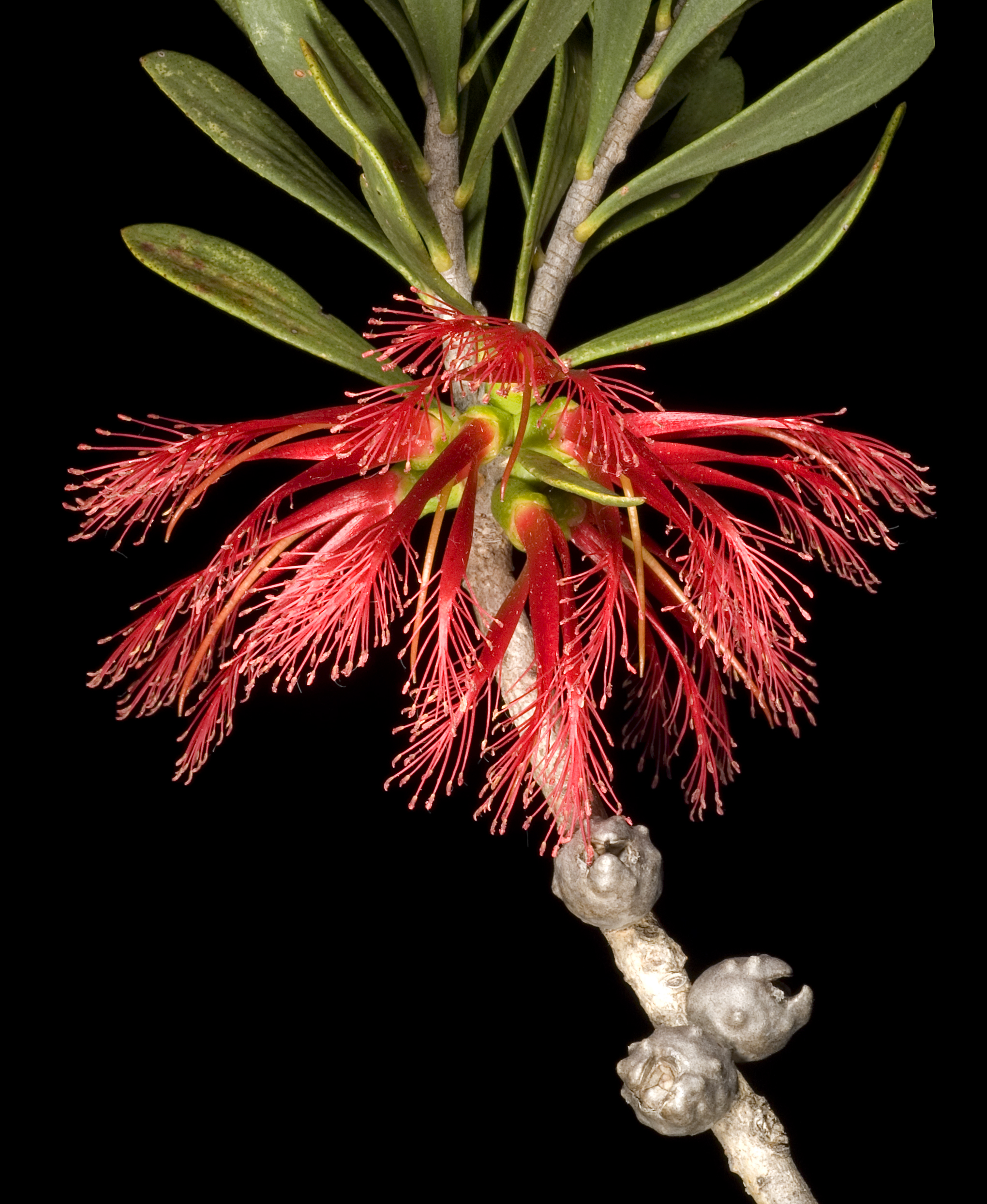
C. quadrifidus subsp.homalophyllus

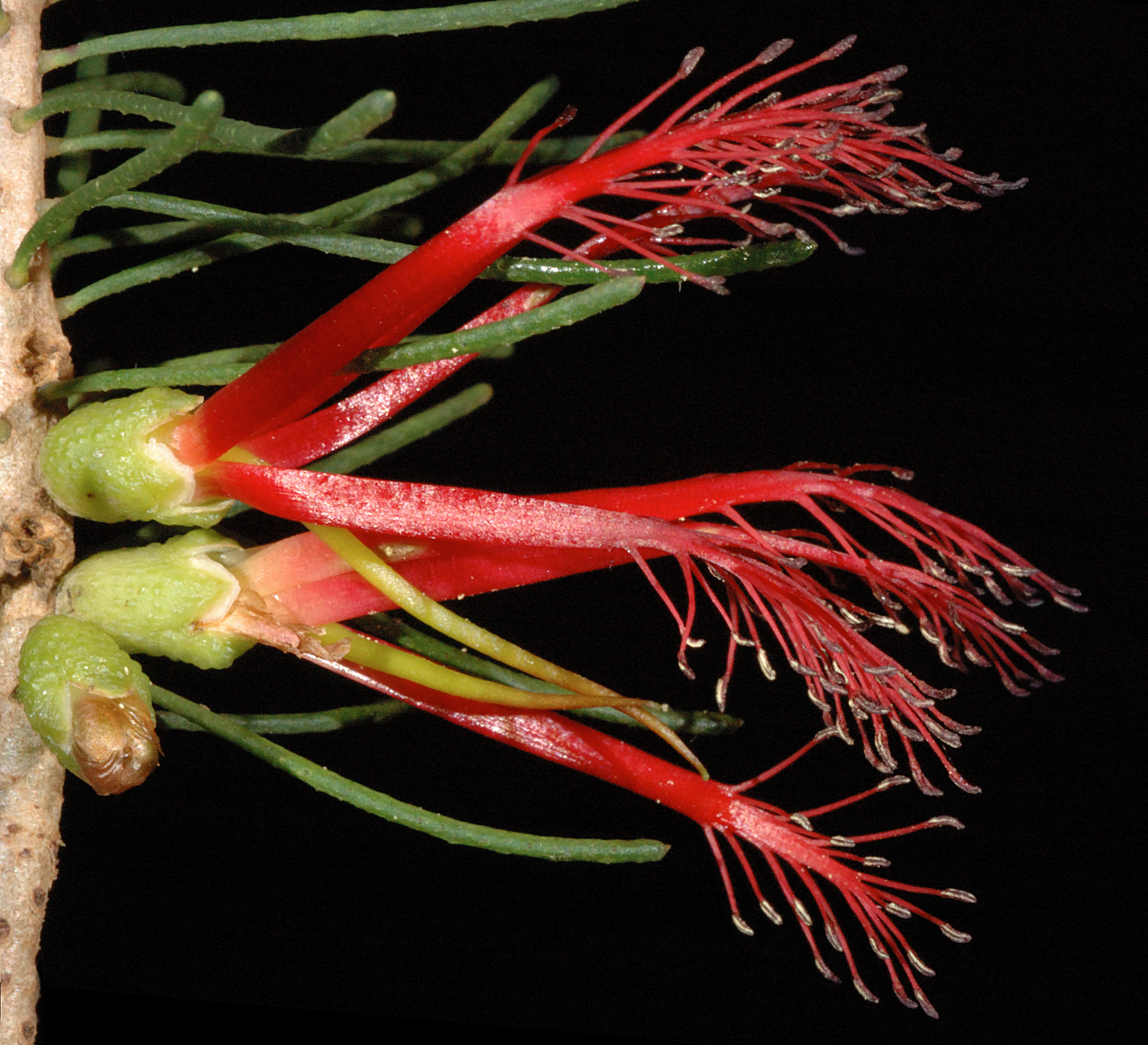
C. quadrifidus subsp.quadrifidus

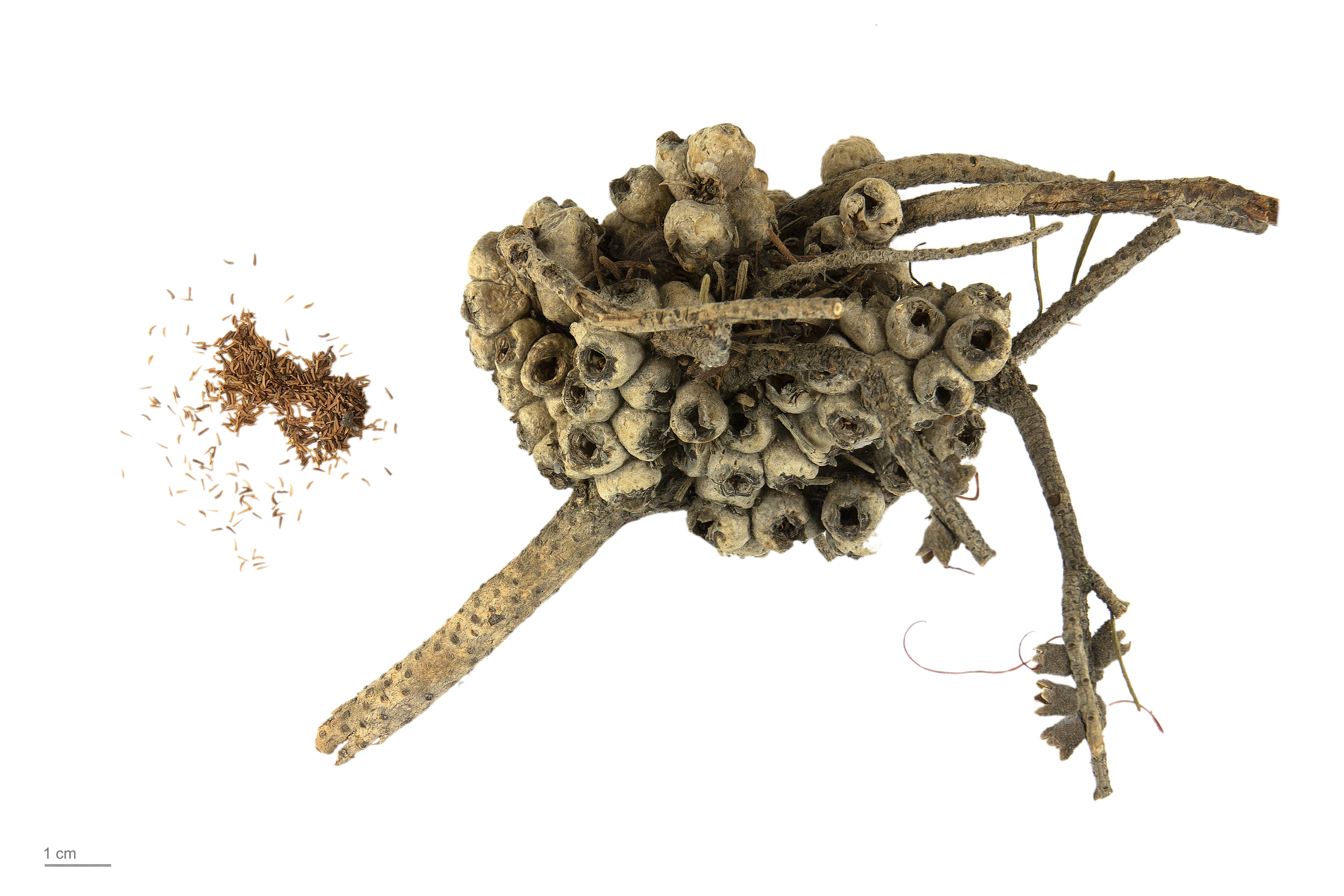
Melaleuca quadrifida - MHNT
