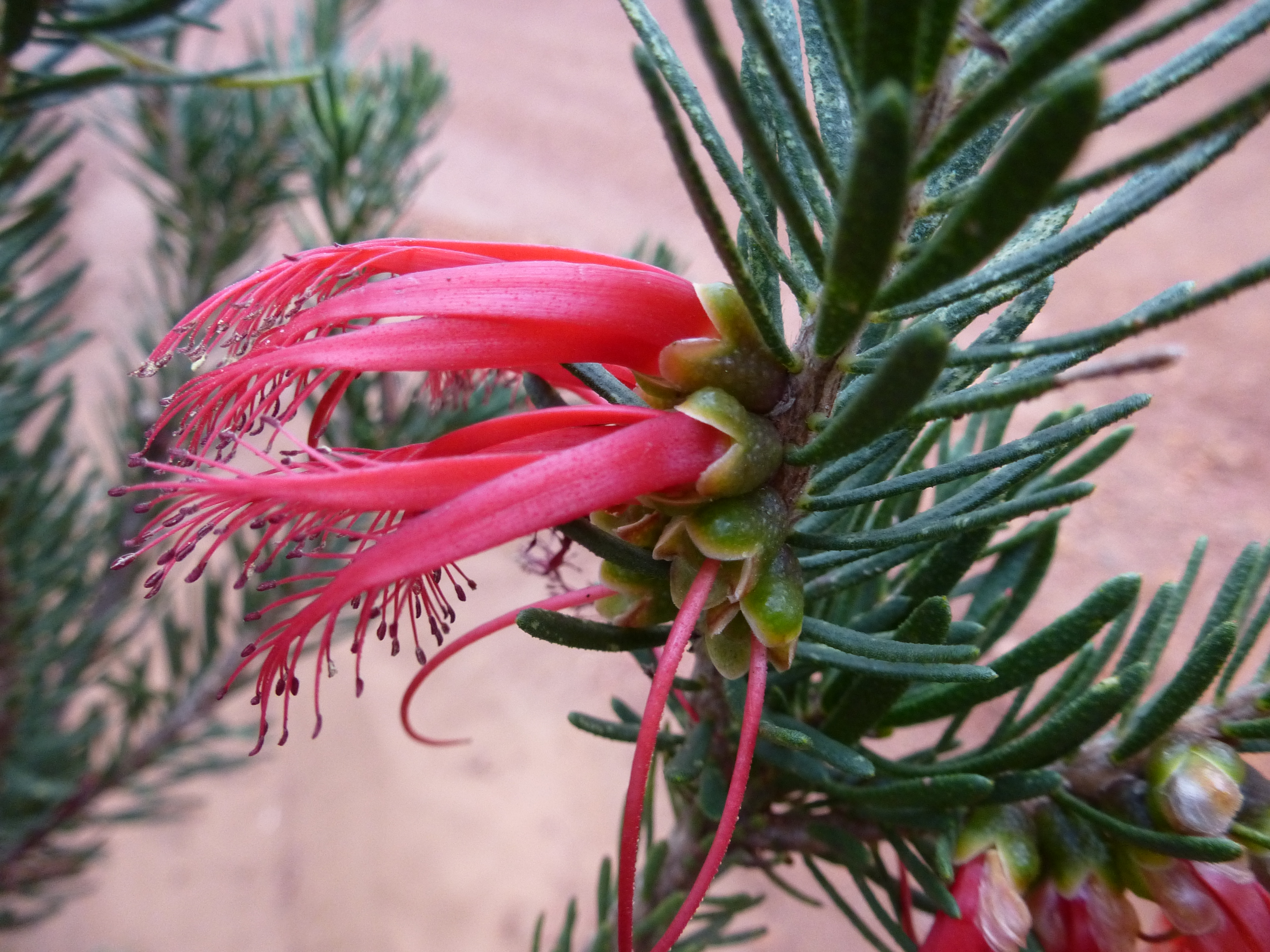
- Calothamnus quadrifidus asper leaves and flowers

Conservation status
- Priority Two — Poorly Known Taxa (DEC)

Scientific classification
- Kingdom: Plantae
- Clade: Tracheophytes
- Clade: Angiosperms
- Clade: Eudicots
- Clade: Rosids
- Order: Myrtales
- Family: Myrtaceae
- Genus: Calothamnus
- Species: C. quadrifidus
- Subspecies: C. q. subsp. asper

Trinomial name
- Calothamnus quadrifidus subsp. asper (Turcz.) A.S.George & N.Gibson

Synonyms
- Melaleuca quadrifida subsp. aspera (Turcz.) Craven & R.D.Edwards

= Calothamnus quadrifidus subsp. asper =

Subspecies of flowering plant

Calothamnus quadrifidus subsp. asper is a plant in the myrtle family, Myrtaceae and is endemic to the south-west of Western Australia. It is similar to other subspecies of Calothamnus quadrifidus except that its leaves are short, flat and obviously rough and scaly when mature.

== Description ==
Calothamnus quadrifidus subsp. asper is an erect shrub which sometimes grows to a height of 4 metres (10 ft) and lacks a lignotuber. Its leaves are flat, linear to narrow egg-shaped with the narrow end towards the base, 10–23 millimetres (0.4–0.9 in) long and 1–2 millimetres (0.04–0.08 in) wide. The leaves are also rough and scaly, with scattered hairs.

The flowers are a deep red colour and are arranged in clusters, usually on one side of the stem amongst the older leaves. The stamens are arranged in 4 claw-like bundles, each about 23–28 millimetres (0.9–1 in) long. Flowering occurs from August to September and is followed by fruits which are woody, barrel-shaped capsules, 10–14 millimetres (0.4–0.6 in) long.

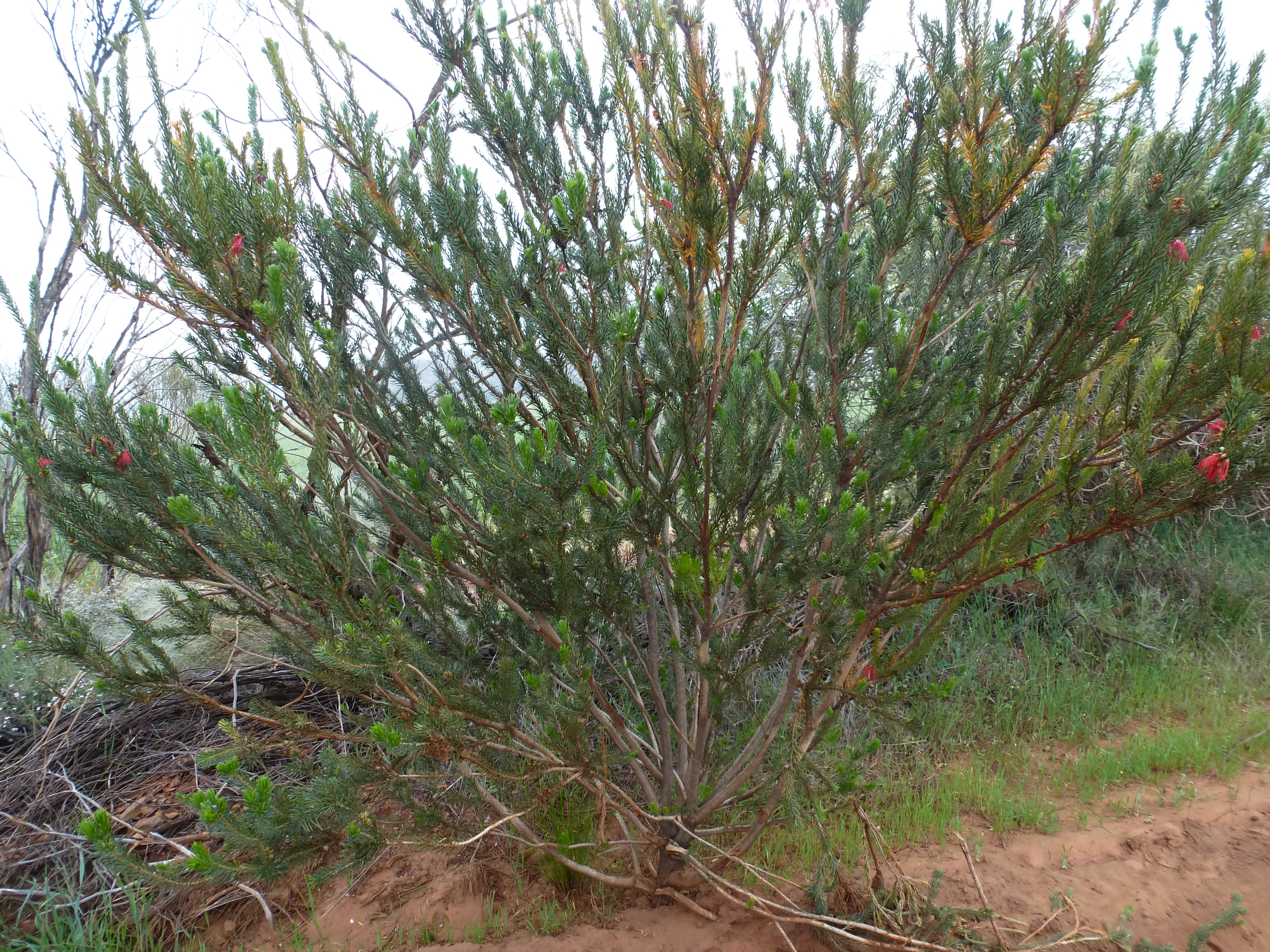
Calothamnus quadrifidus asper growing near Wongan Hills

== Taxonomy and naming ==
Calothamnus quadrifidus subsp. asper was first formally described in 2010 by Alex George in Nuytsia. It had originally been described in 1849 by Nikolai Turczaninow as Calothamnus asper. The word (asper) is a Latin word meaning "rough", "harsh" or "uneven".

== Distribution and habitat ==
Calothamnus quadrifidus subsp. asper is found in the Wongan Hills district of the Avon Wheatbelt biogeographic region.

== Conservation ==
Calothamnus quadrifidus subsp. asper is classified as "Priority Two" by the Western Australian Government Department of Parks and Wildlife meaning that it is poorly known and from fewer than five locations.
