= Calothamnus quadrifidus subsp. angustifolius =

Scientific classification
- Kingdom: Plantae
- Clade: Tracheophytes
- Clade: Angiosperms
- Clade: Eudicots
- Clade: Rosids
- Order: Myrtales
- Family: Myrtaceae
- Genus: Calothamnus
- Species: C. quadrifidus
- Subspecies: C. q. subsp. angustifolius

Trinomial name
- Calothamnus quadrifidus subsp. angustifolius (Ewart) A.S.George & N.Gibson

Synonyms
- Melaleuca quadrifida subsp. angustifolia (Ewart) Craven & R.D.Edwards

Subspecies of flowering plant

Calothamnus quadrifidus subsp. angustifolia is a plant in the myrtle family, Myrtaceae and is endemic to the south-west of Western Australia. It is similar to other subspecies of Calothamnus quadrifidus except that it has longer leaves than most although in some areas there are plants that are intermediate with Calothamnus quadrifolius subsp. obtusus. The leaves are flat, narrow and prickly.

== Description ==
Calothamnus quadrifidus subsp. angustifolia is an erect shrub which sometimes grows to a height of 4 metres (10 ft) and lacks a lignotuber. Its leaves are flat, linear to narrow egg-shaped with the narrow end towards the base, prickly, 22–55 millimetres (0.9–2 in) long and 1–3 millimetres (0.04–0.1 in) wide.

The flowers are red and are arranged in clusters, usually on one side of the stem amongst the older leaves. The stamens are arranged in 4 claw-like bundles, each about 22–36 millimetres (0.9–1 in) long. Flowering occurs from August to November and is followed by fruits which are woody, barrel-shaped capsules, 6–10 millimetres (0.2–0.4 in) long.

== Taxonomy and naming ==
Calothamnus quadrifidus subsp. angustifolia was first formally described in 2010 by Alex George in Nuytsia from a specimen collected near central Greenough. It had originally been described in 1911 by Alfred James Ewart as Calothamnus homalophyllus var. angustifolius. The epithet angustifolius is derived from the Latin words angustus meaning "narrow, tight, slender or thin" and folium meaning "leaf".

== Distribution and habitat ==
Calothamnus quadrifidus subsp. angustifolius is found inland from Busselton in the Avon Wheatbelt, Geraldton Sandplains, Mallee and Swan Coastal Plain biogeographic regions. It grows in clay near ironstone in shrubland that is wet in winter.

== Conservation ==
Calothamnus quadrifidus subsp. angustifolius is classified as "not threatened" by the Western Australian government department of parks and wildlife.
