= Calothamnus quadrifidus subsp. teretifolius =

Conservation status
- Priority Four — Rare Taxa (DEC)

Scientific classification
- Kingdom: Plantae
- Clade: Tracheophytes
- Clade: Angiosperms
- Clade: Eudicots
- Clade: Rosids
- Order: Myrtales
- Family: Myrtaceae
- Genus: Calothamnus
- Species: C. quadrifidus
- Subspecies: C. q. subsp. teretifolius

Trinomial name
- Calothamnus quadrifidus subsp. teretifolius A.S.George & N.Gibson

Synonyms
- Melaleuca quadrifida subsp. teretifolia (A.S.George & N.Gibson) Craven & R.D.Edwards

Subspecies of flowering plant

Calothamnus quadrifidus subsp. teretifolius is a plant in the myrtle family, Myrtaceae and is endemic to the south-west of Western Australia. It is similar to other subspecies of Calothamnus quadrifidus except that its leaves are glabrous and cylindrical. (Subspecies quadrifidus also has cylindrical leaves but they often have a covering of long, silky hairs.)

== Description ==
Calothamnus quadrifidus subsp. teretifolius is an erect shrub which sometimes grows to a height of 5 metres (20 ft). Its leaves are linear, circular in cross section, lack hairs, are 15–35 millimetres (0.6–1 in) long and 0.6–1.0 millimetre (0.02–0.04 in) wide.

The flowers are red and are arranged in clusters, usually on one side of the stem amongst the older leaves. The stamens are arranged in 4 claw-like bundles, each about 26–29 millimetres (1.0–1.1 in) long. Flowering occurs from September to December and is followed by fruits which are woody capsules, 6.5–9 millimetres (0.3–0.4 in) long.

== Taxonomy and naming ==
Calothamnus quadrifidus subsp. teretifolius was first formally described in 2010 by Alex George in Nuytsia from a specimen collected west of the Whicher Scarp. The epithet teretifolius is "from the Latin teres (terete) and folium (a leaf).

== Distribution and habitat ==
Calothamnus quadrifidus subsp. teretifolius is found inland from Busselton in the Jarrah Forest and Swan Coastal Plain biogeographic regions. It grows in clay in winter-west areas in shrubland.

== Conservation ==
Calothamnus quadrifidus subsp. teretifolius is classified as "Priority Four" by the Western Australian Government Department of Parks and Wildlife meaning that it is rare or near threatened.
