= Calothamnus quadrifidus subsp. quadrifidus =

Scientific classification
- Kingdom: Plantae
- Clade: Tracheophytes
- Clade: Angiosperms
- Clade: Eudicots
- Clade: Rosids
- Order: Myrtales
- Family: Myrtaceae
- Genus: Calothamnus
- Species: C. quadrifidus R.Br.
- Subspecies: C. q. subsp. quadrifidus

Trinomial name
- Calothamnus quadrifidus subsp. quadrifidus

Synonyms
- Melaleuca quadrifida subsp. quadrifida (R.Br.) Craven & R.D.Edwards

Subspecies of flowering plant

Calothamnus quadrifidus subsp. quadrifidus is a plant in the myrtle family, Myrtaceae and is endemic to the south-west of Western Australia. It is similar to other subspecies of Calothamnus quadrifidus except that its leaves are circular in cross section and the leaves and flower cup (the hypanthium) usually have a sparse covering of long, soft hairs. (The only other subspecies with cylinder-shaped leaves is teretifolius and its leaves and hypanthium are glabrous.)

== Description ==
Calothamnus quadrifidus subsp. quadrifidus is an erect or sprawling shrub which sometimes grows to a height of 3 metres (10 ft). Its leaves are linear, sometimes slightly expanded in the middle, and circular in cross section. They are 10–35 millimetres (0.4–1 in) long and 0.5–1.0 millimetre (0.02–0.04 in) wide and sparsely covered with long silky hairs, at least when young.

The flowers are red and arranged in clusters, usually on one side of the stem amongst the older leaves. The hypanthium usually has a covering of soft, silky hairs, at least on the lower part and the stamens are arranged in 4 claw-like bundles, each about 22–35 millimetres (0.9–1 in) long. Flowering mainly occurs from September to December and is followed by fruits which are woody capsules, 7–10 millimetres (0.3–0.4 in) long.

== Taxonomy and naming ==
Calothamnus quadrifidus subsp. quadrifidus was first formally described in 2010 by Alex George in Nuytsia.

== Distribution and habitat ==
Calothamnus quadrifidus subsp. quadrifidus is the most variable subspecies and occurs over the widest area. It is found in the western part of the wheatbelt and as far north as Northampton, as far inland as Mullewa and Hyden and as far south as Albany and Israelite Bay. It grows in sand and soils derived from granite or laterite.

== Conservation ==
Calothamnus quadrifidus subsp. quadrifidus is classified as "not threatened" by the Western Australian government department of parks and wildlife
