= Calothamnus quadrifidus subsp. seminudus =

Scientific classification
- Kingdom: Plantae
- Clade: Tracheophytes
- Clade: Angiosperms
- Clade: Eudicots
- Clade: Rosids
- Order: Myrtales
- Family: Myrtaceae
- Genus: Calothamnus
- Species: C. quadrifidus
- Subspecies: C. q. subsp. seminudus

Trinomial name
- Calothamnus quadrifidus subsp. seminudus A.S.George & N.Gibson

Synonyms
- Melaleuca quadrifida subsp. seminuda (A.S.George & N.Gibson) Craven & R.D.Edwards

Subspecies of flowering plant

Calothamnus quadrifidus subsp. seminudus is a plant in the myrtle family, Myrtaceae and is endemic to the south-west of Western Australia. It is similar to other subspecies of Calothamnus quadrifidus except that its leaves are linear and somewhat rough and scaly and the stamen bundles are relatively long.

== Description ==
Calothamnus quadrifidus subsp. seminudus is an erect or spreading shrub which sometimes grows to a height of 2.0 metres (7 ft) and lacks a lignotuber. Its leaves are crowded, flat and linear or very narrow egg-shaped with the narrower end towards the base. They are 10–20 millimetres (0.4–0.8 in) long and 0.8–1.5 millimetres (0.03–0.06 in) wide.

The flowers are red and arranged in clusters, usually on one side of the stem amongst the older leaves. The stamens are arranged in 4 claw-like bundles, each about 25–28 millimetres (0.98–1.1 in) long. The lower half of the outer surface of the floral cup (the hypanthium) is hairy while the upper part is glabrous. Flowering mainly occurs from August to December and is followed by fruits which are woody, roughly spherical capsules, 8–9 millimetres (0.31–0.35 in) long when mature. (Subspecies seminudus is similar to petraeus but has smaller fruit.)

== Taxonomy and naming ==
Calothamnus quadrifidus subsp. seminudus was first formally described in 2010 by Alex George in Nuytsia from a specimen collected near Digger Rocks, north of Lake King. The epithet seminudus is "from the Latin semi- (half) and nudus (bare), in reference to the hypanthium which is glabrous in the upper half to two-thirds".

== Distribution and habitat ==
Calothamnus quadrifidus subsp. seminudus occurs in the Ironcaps, Bremer Range and Peak Charles areas in the Avon Wheatbelt, Coolgardie and Mallee biogeographic regions. It grows in sand derived from laterite in mallee shrubland.

== Conservation ==
Calothamnus quadrifidus subsp. seminudus is classified as "not threatened" by the Western Australian Government Department of Parks and Wildlife.
