= Calothamnus quadrifidus subsp. petraeus =

Scientific classification
- Kingdom: Plantae
- Clade: Tracheophytes
- Clade: Angiosperms
- Clade: Eudicots
- Clade: Rosids
- Order: Myrtales
- Family: Myrtaceae
- Genus: Calothamnus
- Species: C. quadrifidus
- Subspecies: C. q. subsp. petraeus

Trinomial name
- Calothamnus quadrifidus subsp. petraeus A.S.George & N.Gibson

Synonyms
- Melaleuca quadrifida subsp. petraea (A.S.George & N.Gibson) Craven & R.D.Edwards

Subspecies of flowering plant

Calothamnus quadrifidus subsp. petraeus is a plant in the myrtle family, Myrtaceae and is endemic to the south-west of Western Australia. It is similar to other subspecies of Calothamnus quadrifidus except that its leaves are linear and somewhat rough and scaly and the stamen bundles are relatively long. (Subspecies seminudus is similar to petraeus but has smaller fruit.)

== Description ==
Calothamnus quadrifidus subsp. petraeus is an erect or spreading shrub which sometimes grows to a height of 2.5 metres (8 ft) and lacks a lignotuber. Its leaves are crowded, flat and linear with the outer part slightly expanded, 10–23 millimetres (0.4–0.9 in) long and 0.9–1.1 millimetres (0.035–0.043 in) wide. The leaves, when mature, are either covered with long soft hairs or they are rough and scaly.

The flowers are red and arranged in clusters, usually on one side of the stem amongst the older leaves. The stamens are arranged in 4 claw-like bundles, each about 25–30 millimetres (0.98–1.2 in) long. The outer surface of the floral cup (the hypanthium) and the sepals are hairy. Flowering mainly occurs from August to October and is followed by fruits which are woody, roughly spherical capsules, 10–11 millimetres (0.39–0.43 in) long when mature.

== Taxonomy and naming ==
Calothamnus quadrifidus subsp. petraeus was first formally described in 2010 by Alex George in Nuytsia from a specimen collected near Yellowdine. The epithet is said to be from the Greek petraeus, meaning "rocky", in reference to the occurrence on rock outcrops. The proper word in ancient Greek for "rocky" is however petraios (πετραῖος).

== Distribution and habitat ==
Calothamnus quadrifidus subsp. petraeus occurs in the area between Karroun Hill Nature Reserve, Merredin and Yellowdine in the Avon Wheatbelt, Coolgardie and Mallee biogeographic regions. It grows in sand derived from granite or quartzite.

== Conservation ==
Calothamnus quadrifidus subsp. petraeus is classified as "not threatened" by the Western Australian Government Department of Parks and Wildlife.
