= Lucky Bay =

Bay near Esperance, Western Australia

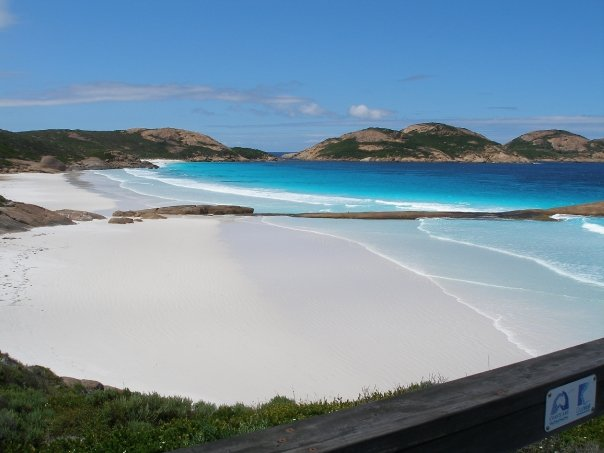
- Interactive map of Lucky Bay
- Coordinates: 33°59′40″S 122°13′57″E

Lucky Bay is a bay on the south coast of Western Australia, part of Cape Le Grand National Park. Located southeast of Esperance, the bay is a tourist spot known for its bright white sands and turquoise-coloured waters.

In May 2023, Lucky Bay was voted as the best beach in the world in a study based on the votes of over 750 travel professionals.

== History ==
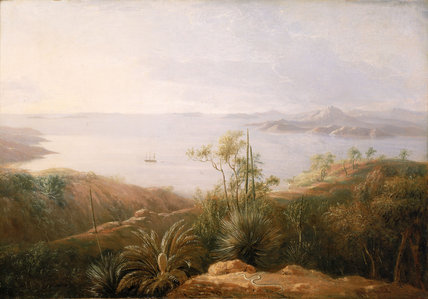
A Bay on the South Coast of New Holland, an early 19th-century oil painting of Lucky Bay by William Westall

Matthew Flinders sailed into the hazardous Recherche Archipelago, and found his ship surrounded by islands and rocks with nightfall coming on. He named this area Lucky Bay when his vessel HMS Investigator took refuge there after a summer storm. Recounting the adventure, Flinders wrote:

The chart alone can give any adequate idea of this labyrinth of islands and rocks [...]. Seeing no probability of reaching a space of clear water in which to stand off and on during the night, and no prospect of shelter under any of the islands, I found myself under the necessity of adopting a hazardous measure; and with the concurrence of the master's opinion, we steered directly before the wind for the main coast, where the appearance of some beaches, behind other islands, gave a hope of finding anchorage. At seven in the evening we entered a small sandy bay; and finding it sheltered everywhere except to the south-westward, in which direction there were many islands and rocks in the offing to break off the sea, the anchor was dropped in 7 fathoms [13 m], sandy bottom. The master sounded round the ship, but nothing was found to injure the cables; and except the water being shallow in the north-west corner of the bay, there was no danger to be apprehended, unless from strong south-west winds. The critical circumstance under which this place was discovered induced me to give it the name of Lucky Bay.

== White sand ==
In 2017 it was scientifically tested as having the whitest sand in Australia, and possibly the world, outdoing Hyams Beach. Samples were collected from the top 10 centimetres (3.9 in) between the water and the sand dunes. The whitest sands are usually made up of fine grains of milky or frosted quartz and a lack of adulteration.

== Tourism ==
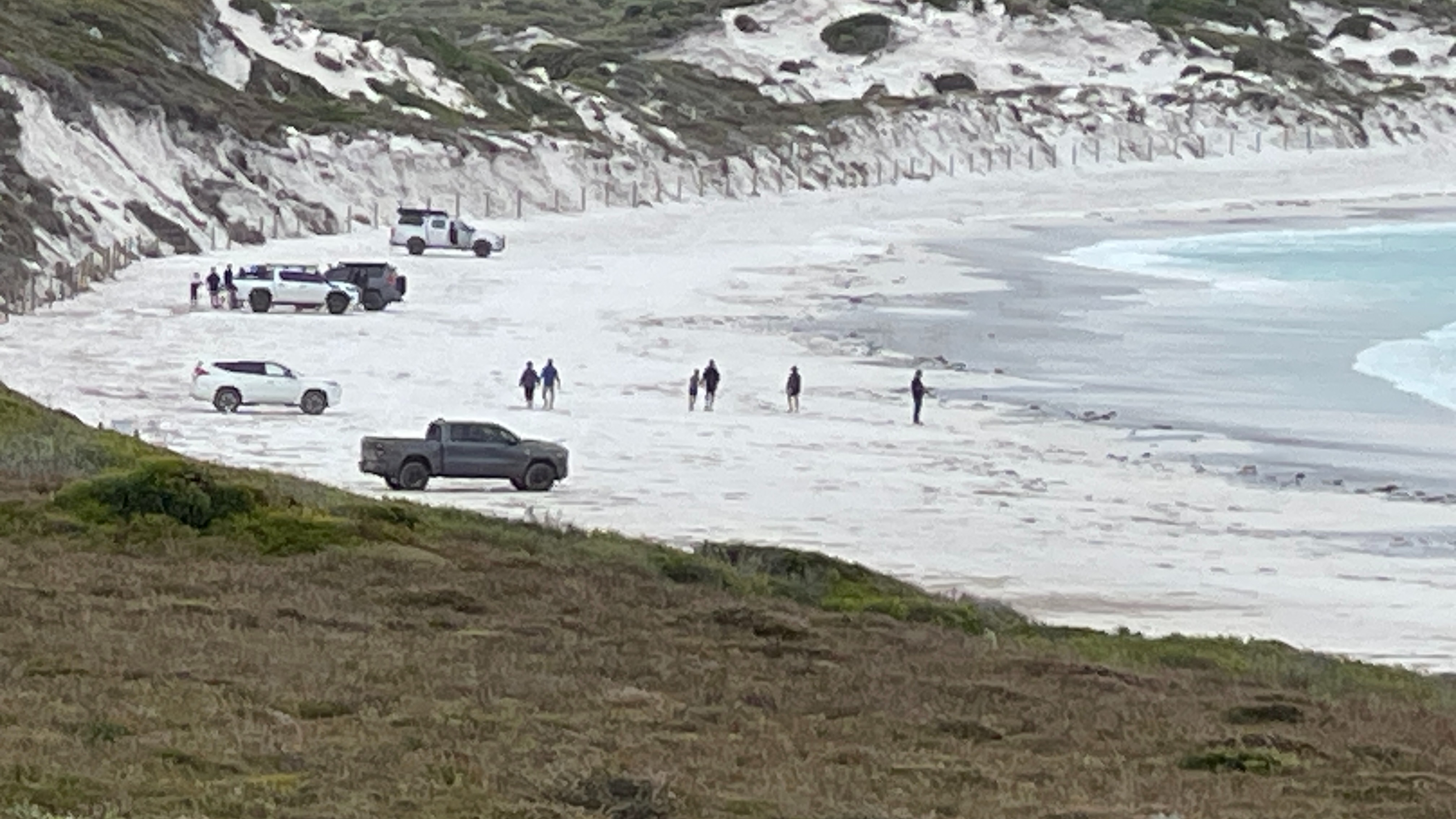
Parking on pure white sand

It is ideal for swimming, snorkelling, fishing, surfing, launching small boats and also for camping and whale watching. Nearby are solar powered showers and public toilets. Kangaroos may be present in the beach area.

== Gallery ==
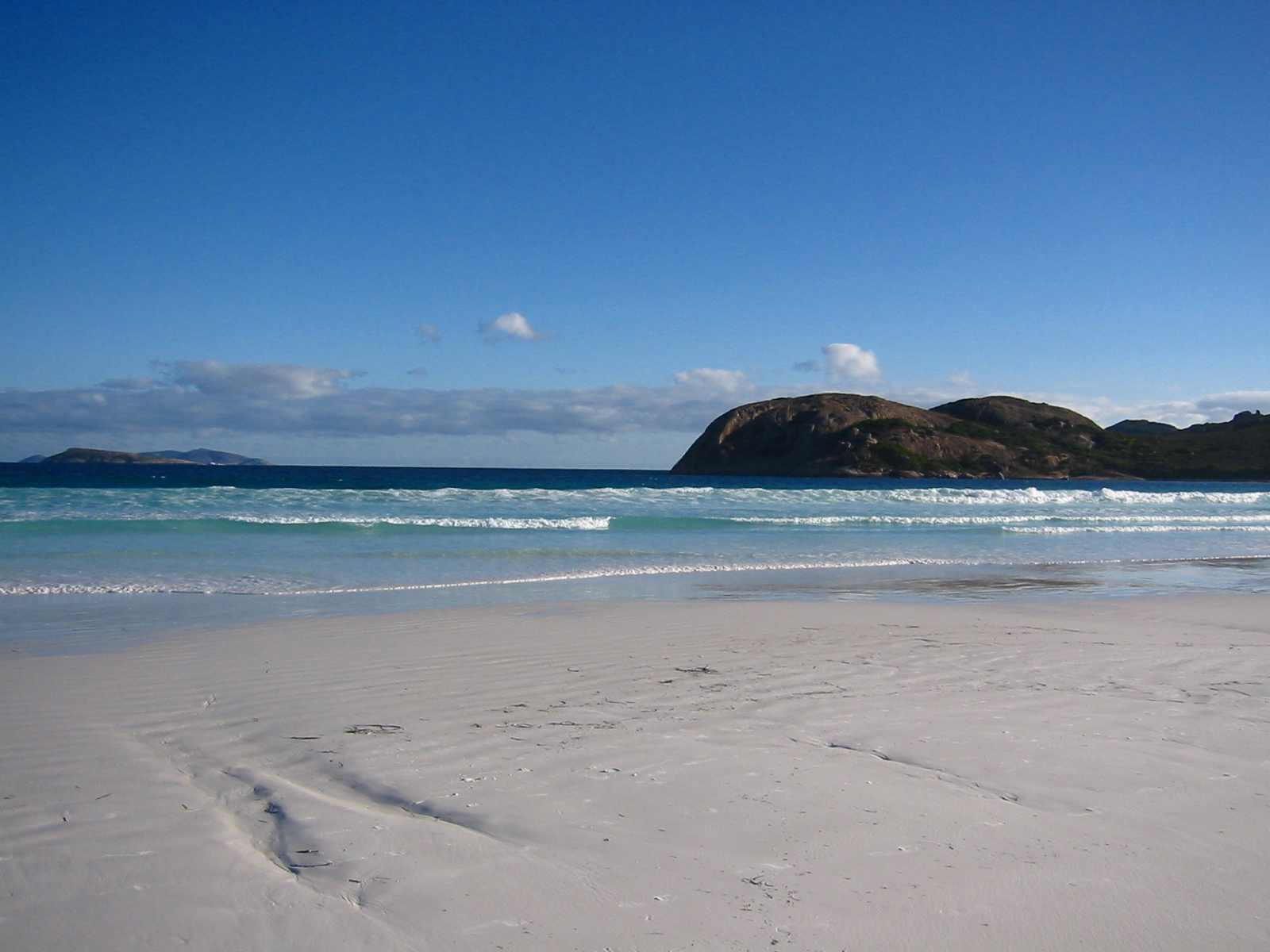

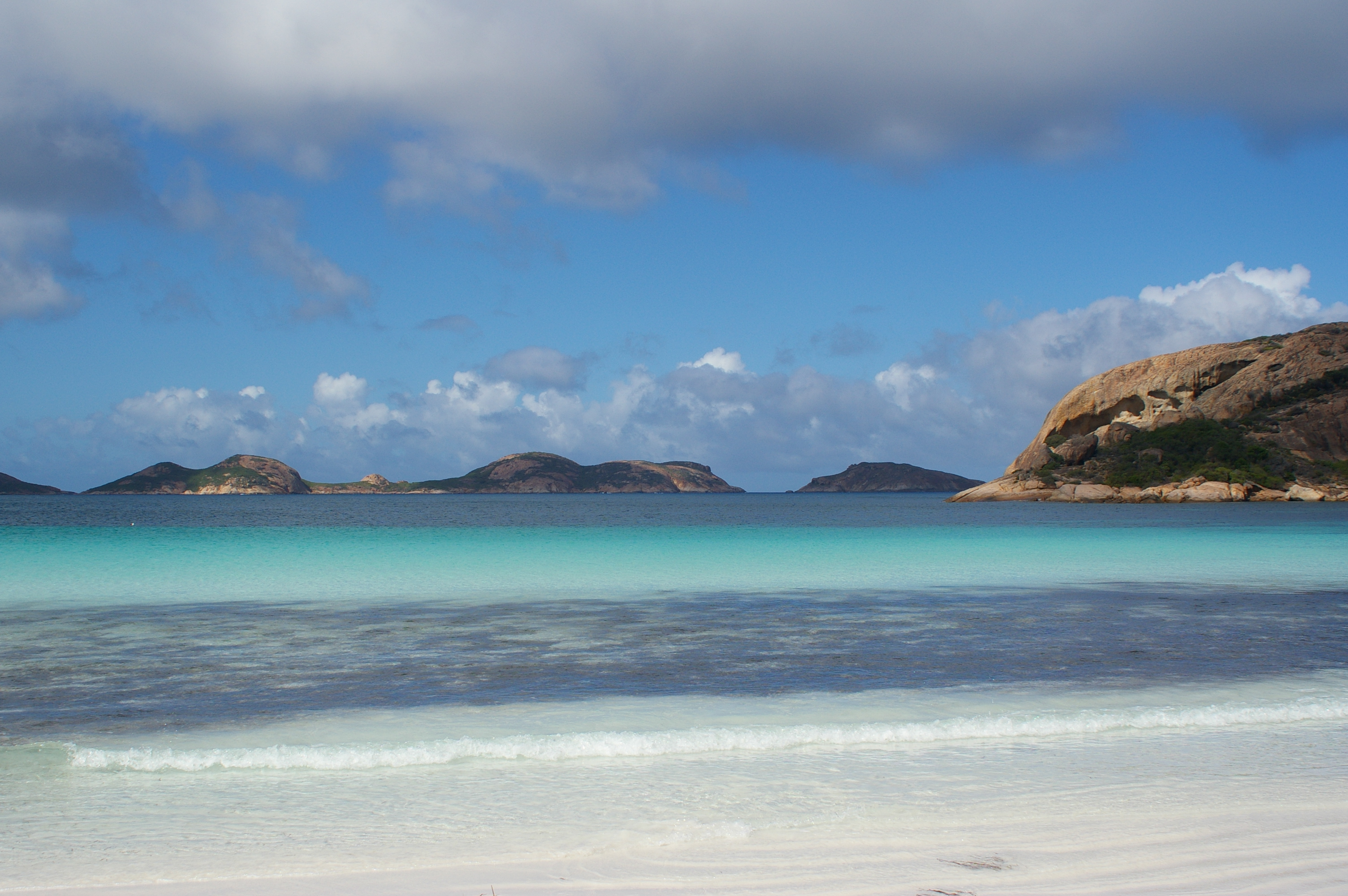

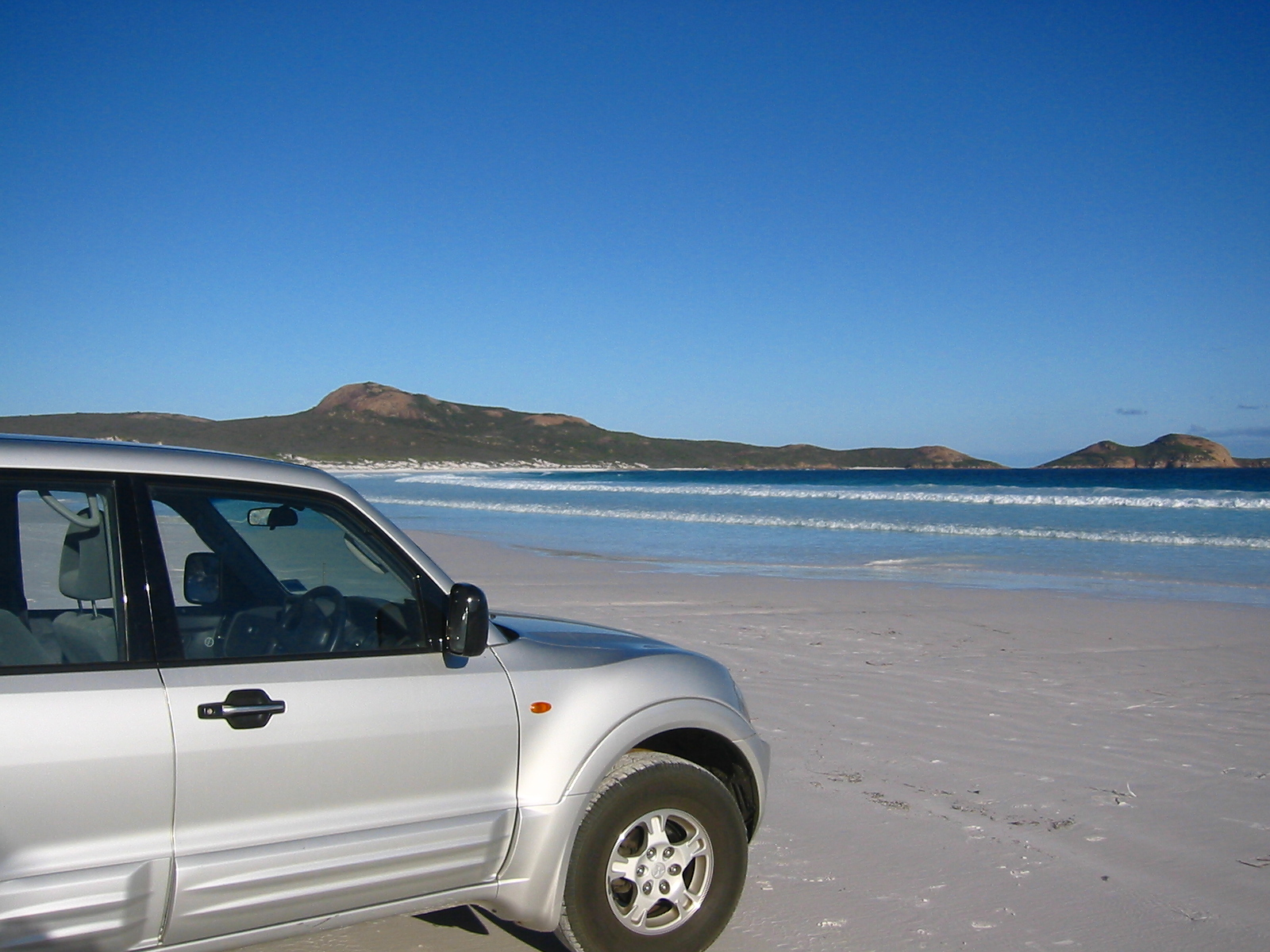

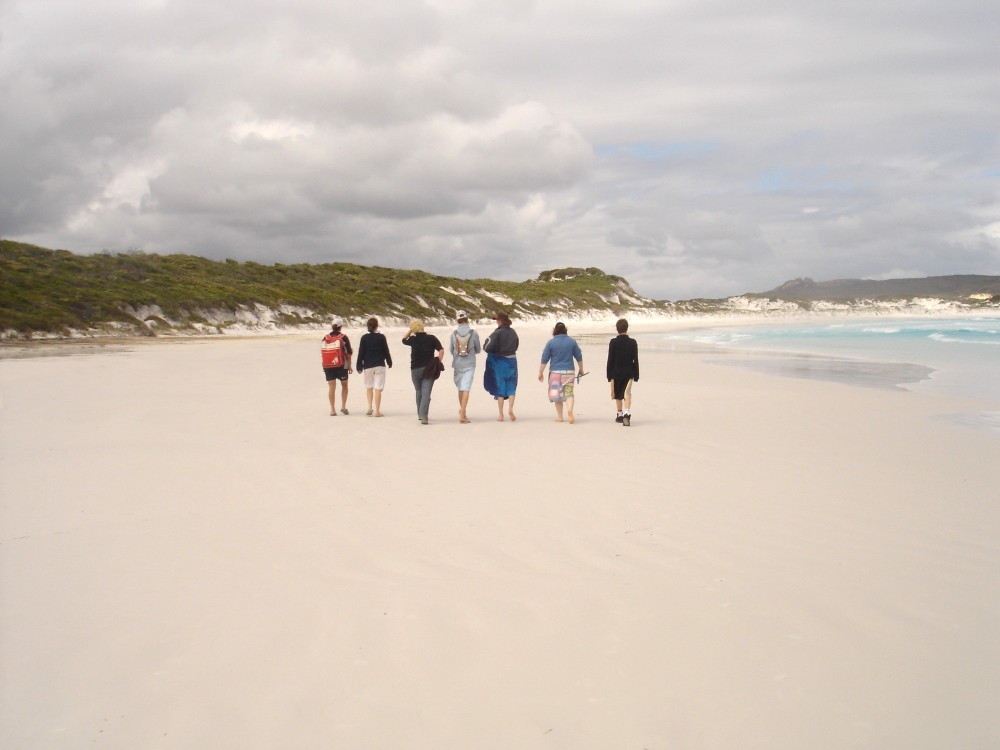

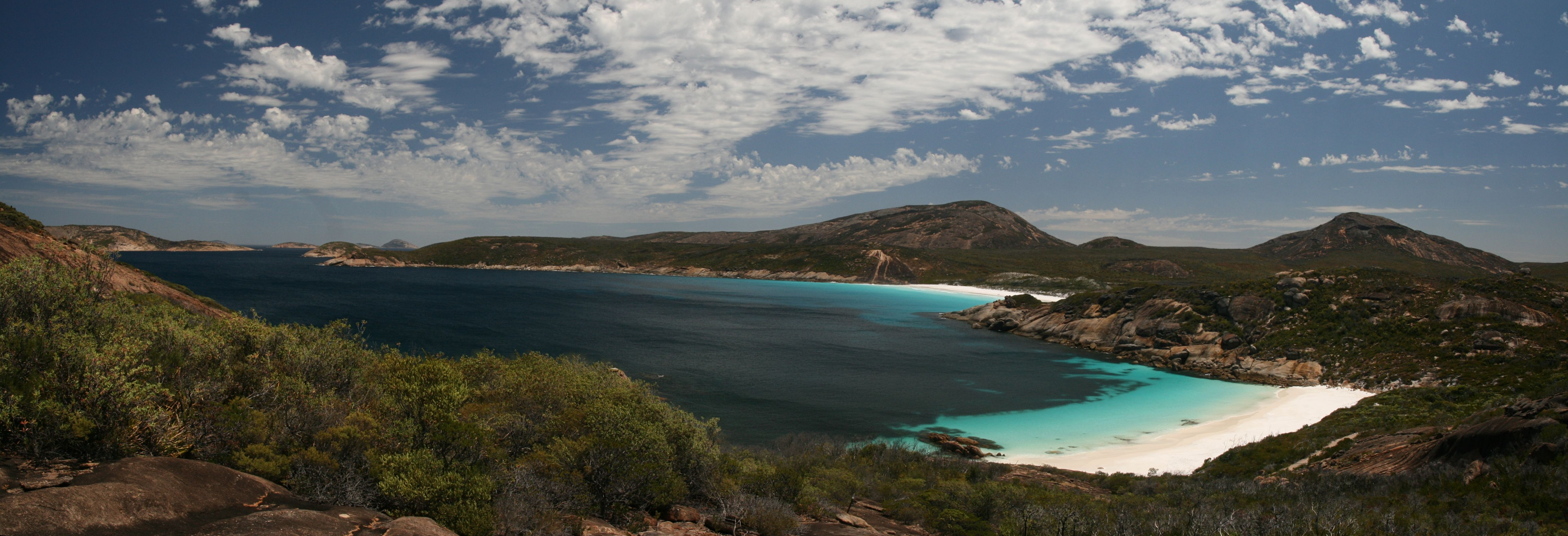

== See also ==
- Whitehaven Beach, a white sandy beach in Queensland
- Hyams Beach, a beach in New South Wales also with white sand

== Sources ==
- Estensen, Miriam (2002). The Life of Matthew Flinders. Crows Nest: Allen & Unwin. ISBN 1-74114-152-4.
- Flinders, Matthew (1814). A Voyage to Terra Australis: Undertaken for the Purpose of Completing the Discovery of that Vast Country, and Prosecuted in the Years 1801, 1802, and 1803, in His Majesty's Ship the Investigator. Vol. 1. London: G. Nicol & Son. Wikidata Q19027014.
