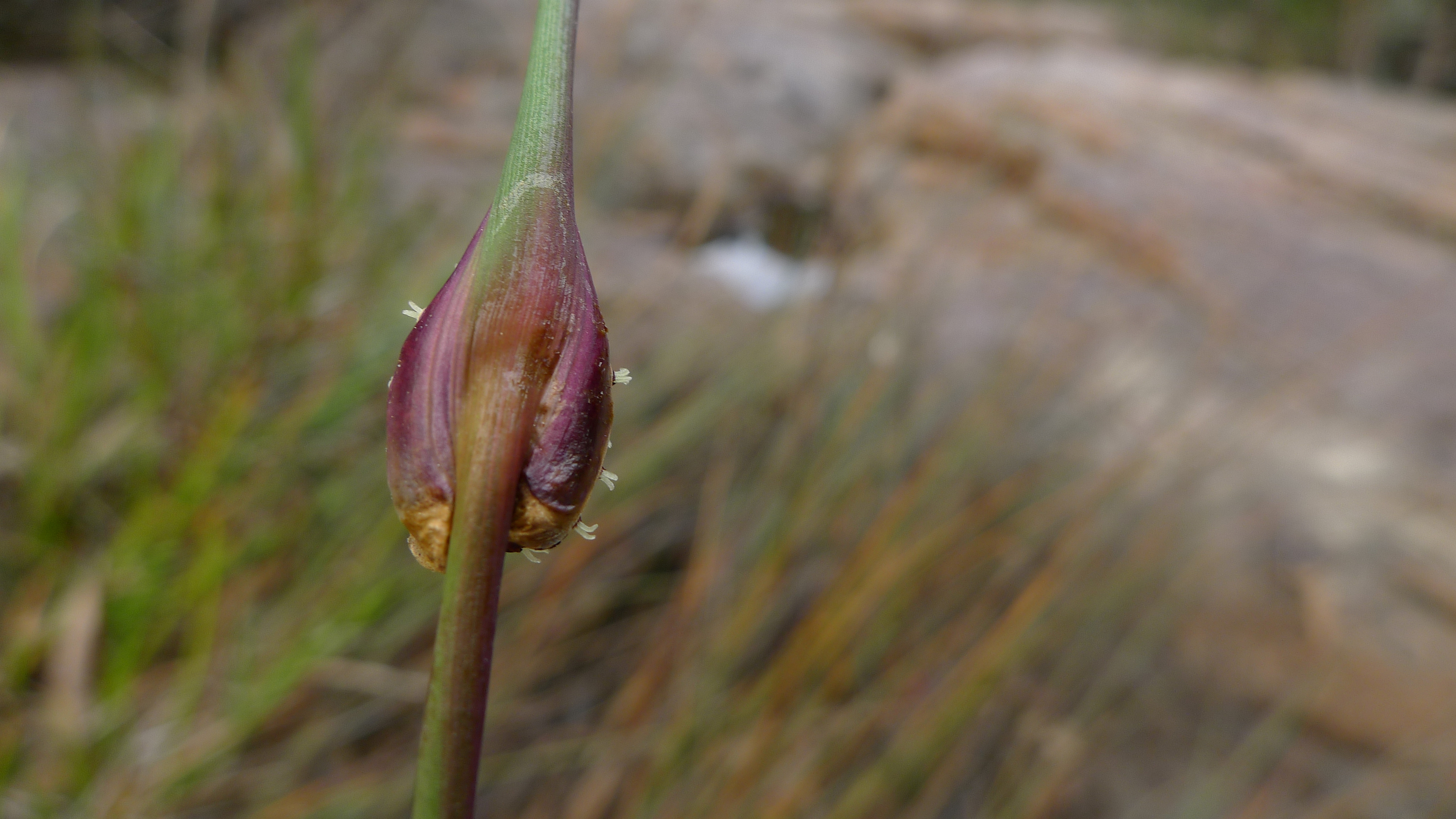
- Chorizandra cymbaria inflorescence Heathcote National Park, NSW

Scientific classification
- Kingdom: Plantae
- Clade: Tracheophytes
- Clade: Angiosperms
- Clade: Monocots
- Clade: Commelinids
- Order: Poales
- Family: Cyperaceae
- Genus: Chorizandra
- Species: C. cymbaria

Binomial name
- Chorizandra cymbaria R.Br.

= Chorizandra cymbaria =

Heron bristle rush

Species of grass-like plant

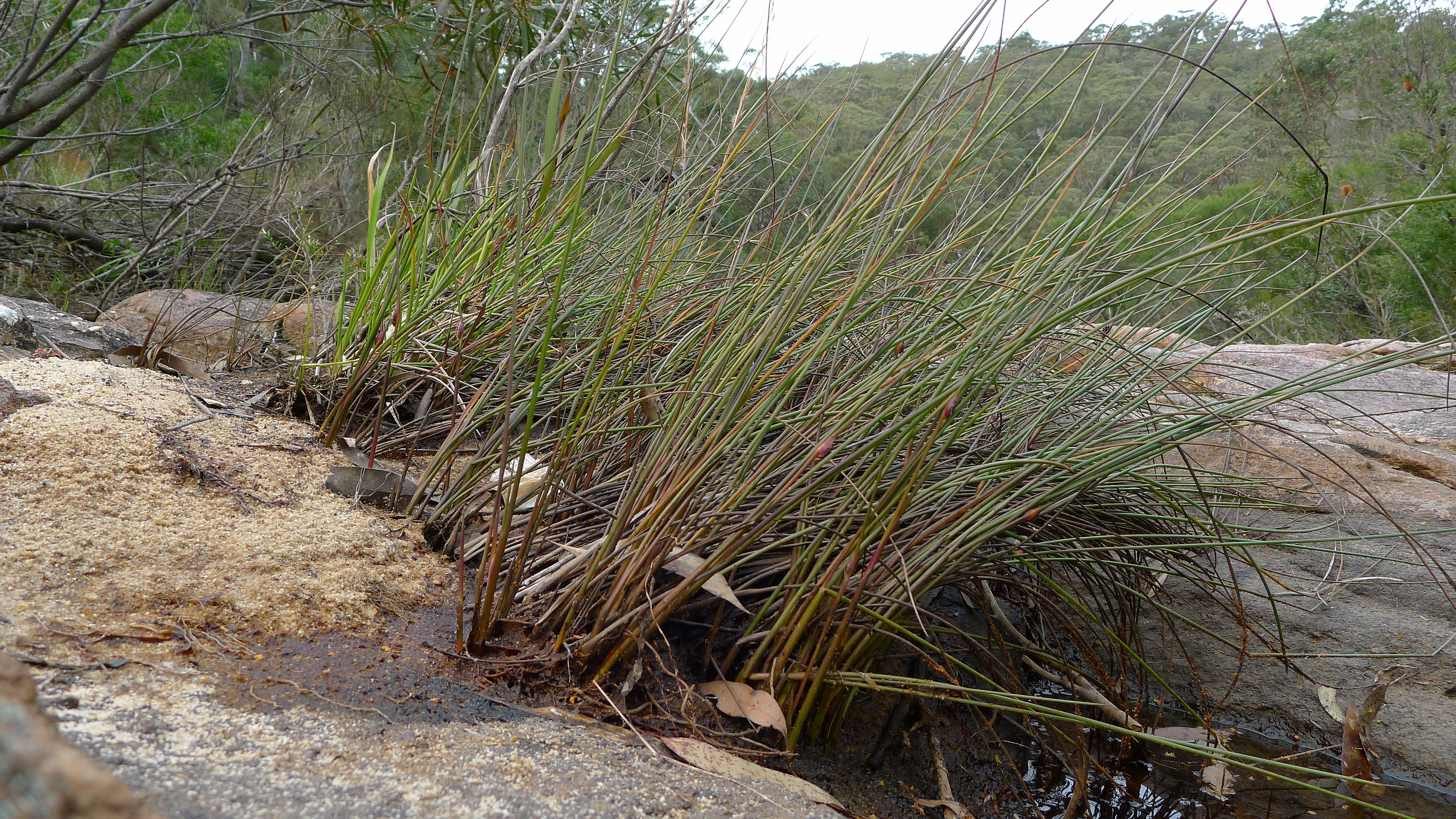
Chorizandra cymbaria habit

Chorizandra cymbaria, commonly known as heron bristle rush or heron bristle sedge, is a sedge of the family Cyperaceae that is native to Australia.

== Description ==
The monoecious and rhizomatous perennial sedge has a dense tufted habit. It typically grows to a height of 0.4 to 1 metre (1.3 to 3.3 ft). The plant blooms between October and December producing purple flowers. The culms are unitubulose and around 0.5 to 1 metre (1.6 to 3.3 ft) in length with a diameter of 1.5 to 4 millimetres (0.059 to 0.157 in). They become yellow-green at maturity and are longitudinally striate. The inner leaf blades grow to about 25 centimetres (9.843 in) long and are yellow-brown to red-brown in colour. The narrow-ovoid to ovoid inflorescence is 11 to 15 mm (0.43 to 0.59 in) in length with a width of 5 to 10 mm (0.20 to 0.39 in) containing may pseudospikelets.

== Classification ==
The plant was first formally described by the botanist Robert Brown in 1810 as part of the work Prodromus Florae Novae Hollandiae. The name is often misapplies to Chorizandra australis.

== Range ==
The species is found in damp areas in Western Australia, Victoria, Tasmania, coastal areas of New South Wales and Queensland. In Western Australia it is found in peaty swamp areas along the coast of the South West and Great Southern regions where it grows in sandy-clay soils.
