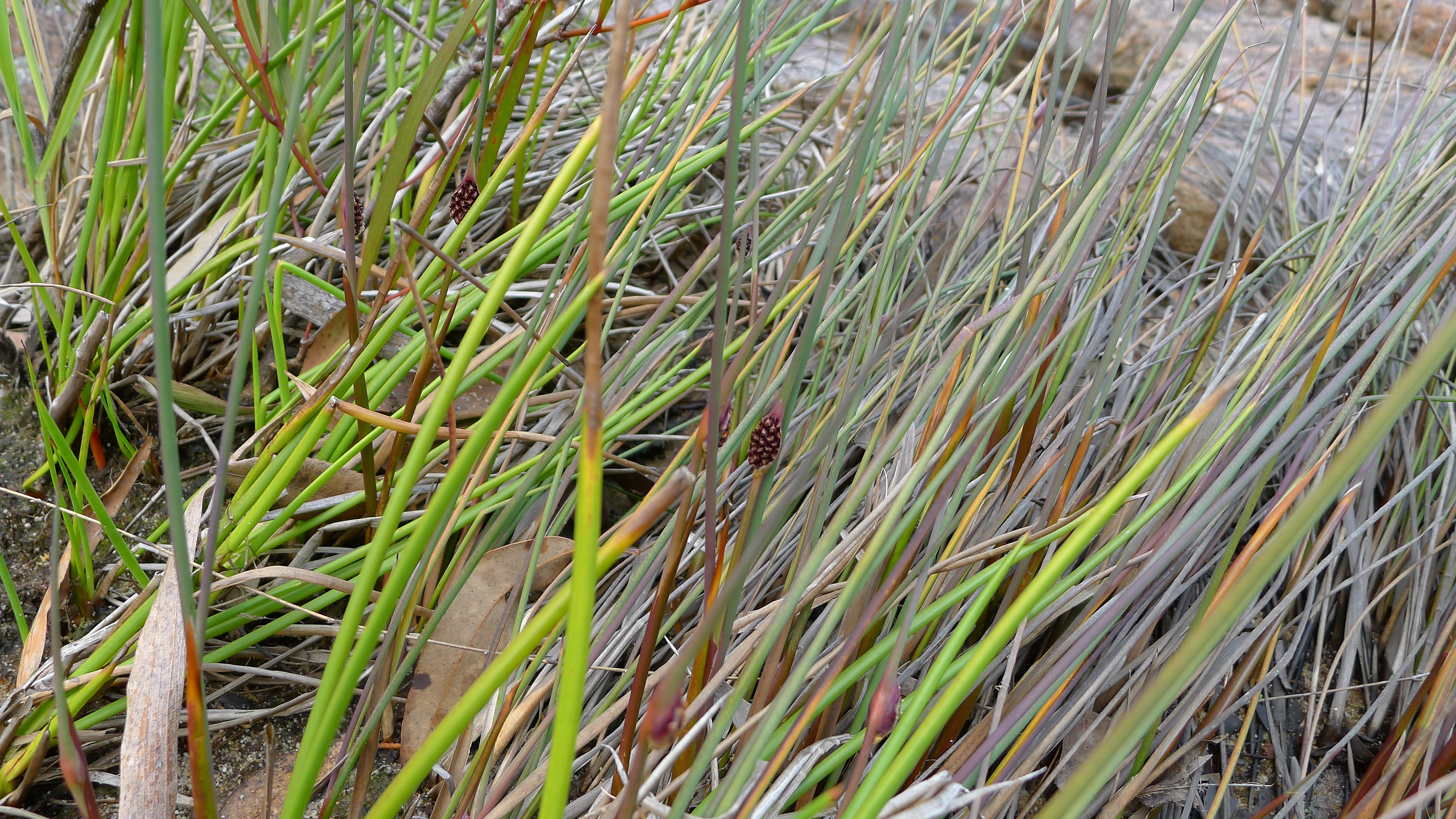
- Chorizandra cymbaria stems and leaves

Scientific classification
- Kingdom: Plantae
- Clade: Tracheophytes
- Clade: Angiosperms
- Clade: Monocots
- Clade: Commelinids
- Order: Poales
- Family: Cyperaceae
- Genus: Chorizandra; R.Br.

= Chorizandra =

Genus of grass-like plants

Chorizandra is a genus of rhizomatous sedges, encompassing six species; four of which are endemic to Australia and two to New Caledonia.

== Description ==
The plants are rhizomatous perennials with terete and glabrous culms that are transversely septate and hollow between septa. The basal leaves are mostly reduced to sheaths with teret blades that are transversely septate. They produce a compact head-like inflorescence that is pseudolateral with many small spikelets surrounding a solid core. They later form brown obovoid to globose longitudinally ridged woody nuts.

== Species ==
Six species are accepted.

- Chorizandra australis K.L.Wilson
- Chorizandra cymbaria R.Br.
- Chorizandra enodis Nees
- Chorizandra gigantea J.Raynal ex K.L.Wilson
- Chorizandra multiarticulata Nees
- Chorizandra sphaerocephala R.Br.
