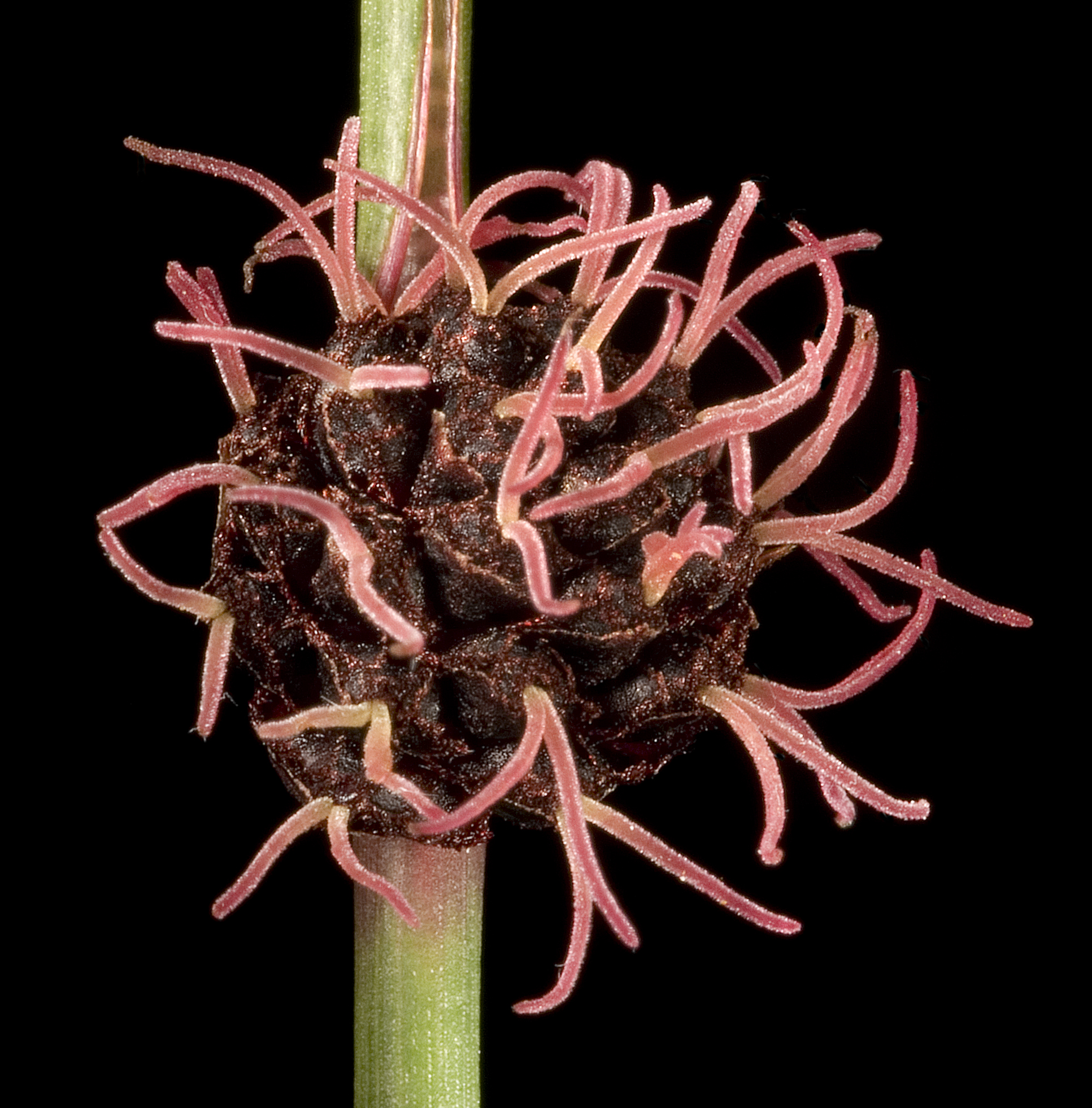
- Chorizandra enodis

Scientific classification
- Kingdom: Plantae
- Clade: Tracheophytes
- Clade: Angiosperms
- Clade: Monocots
- Clade: Commelinids
- Order: Poales
- Family: Cyperaceae
- Genus: Chorizandra
- Species: C. enodis

Binomial name
- Chorizandra enodis Nees

= Chorizandra enodis =

Black bristle rush

Species of plant

Chorizandra enodis, commonly known as black bristle rush or black bristle sedge, is a sedge of the family Cyperaceae that is native to Australia.

The monoecious and rhizomatous perennial sedge has a loosely clumped tufted habit. It typically grows to a height of 0.2 to 1 metre (0.7 to 3.3 ft) and a width of 1 metre (3.3 ft). The plant blooms between July and November producing purple-brown-black flowers.

It forms a single terminal flowerhead that is spherical and dense with a diameter of 7 to 15 millimetres (0.28 to 0.59 in). It is sheathed in a 20 centimetres (8 in) long bract which extends the stem. Floral bracts have white hairs on the tip and red hairs along the margin.

In Western Australia it is found in swampy and seepage areas along the coast of the Mid West, Wheatbelt, South West, Great Southern and Goldfields-Esperance regions where it grows in lateritic sandy-clay soils.
