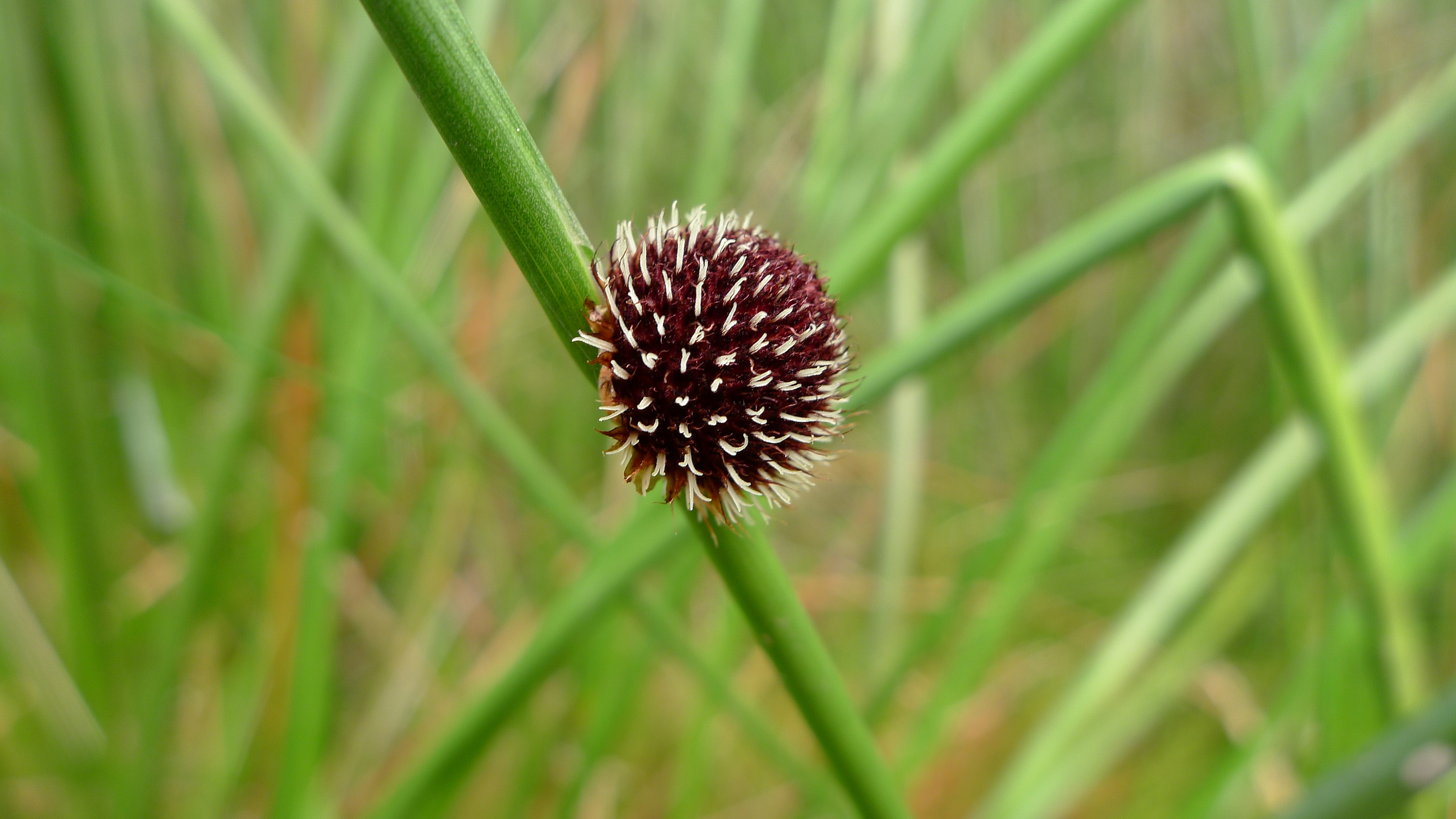
- Royal National Park, NSW

Scientific classification
- Kingdom: Plantae
- Clade: Tracheophytes
- Clade: Angiosperms
- Clade: Monocots
- Clade: Commelinids
- Order: Poales
- Family: Cyperaceae
- Genus: Chorizandra
- Species: C. sphaerocephala

Binomial name
- Chorizandra sphaerocephala R.Br.

= Chorizandra sphaerocephala =

Roundhead Bristle-sedge

Species of grass-like plant

Chorizandra sphaerocephala, the roundhead bristle-sedge, is a species of perennial herb, found in swampy areas in eastern Australia. An erect rush-like plant from 50 to 110 cm tall, it has tough rhizomes and flower from spring to summer. This is one of the many plants first published by Robert Brown with the type known as "(J.) v.v." Appearing in his Prodromus Florae Novae Hollandiae et Insulae Van Diemen in 1810. The specific epithet sphaerocephala refers to the rounded heads.
