= Chorizandra multiarticulata =

Scientific classification
- Kingdom: Plantae
- Clade: Tracheophytes
- Clade: Angiosperms
- Clade: Monocots
- Clade: Commelinids
- Order: Poales
- Family: Cyperaceae
- Genus: Chorizandra
- Species: C. multiarticulata

Binomial name
- Chorizandra multiarticulata Nees

Species of grass-like plant

Chorizandra multiarticulata is a sedge of the family Cyperaceae that is native to Australia.

The monoecious and rhizomatous perennial sedge typically grows to a height of 0.6 metres (2.0 ft). The plant blooms between August and September producing purple-brown flowers.

In Western Australia it is found in swampy areas along the coast of the Wheatbelt and Goldfields-Esperance regions where it grows in sandy-clay soils.
