= Styphelia rigida =

Scientific classification
- Kingdom: Plantae
- Clade: Tracheophytes
- Clade: Angiosperms
- Clade: Eudicots
- Clade: Asterids
- Order: Ericales
- Family: Ericaceae
- Genus: Styphelia
- Species: S. rigida

Binomial name
- Styphelia rigida (A.Cunn. ex DC.) Hislop, Crayn & Puente-Lel.
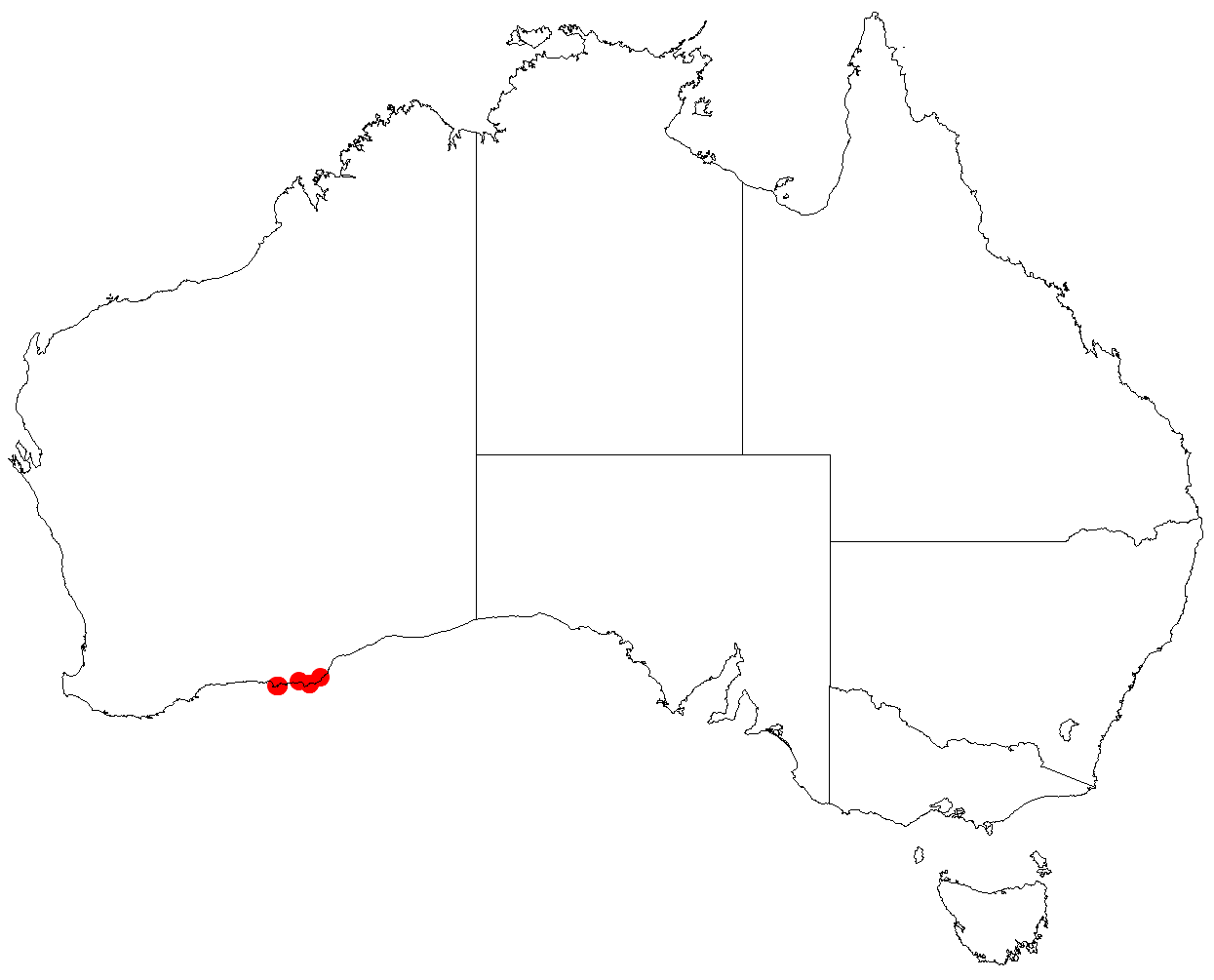
- Occurrence data from AVH

Synonyms
- Leucopogon rigidus A.Cunn. ex DC.

Species of plant

Styphelia rigida is a species of flowering plant in the heath family Ericaceae and is endemic to the south of Western Australia. It was first formally described in 1839 by Augustin Pyramus de Candolle who gave it the name Leucopogon rigidus in his Prodromus Systematis Naturalis Regni Vegetabilis from an unpublished description by Allan Cunningham. In 2020, Michael Hislop, Darren Crayn and Caroline Puente-Lelievre transferred the species to Styphelia as S. rigida in Australian Systematic Botany. The specific epithet (rigida) means "hard" or "stiff", probably referring to the branchlets. Styphelia rigida is found in the Esperance Plains bioregion of southern Western Australia and is listed as "not threatened" by the Western Australian Government Department of Biodiversity, Conservation and Attractions.
