= Styphelia rectiloba =

Conservation status
- Priority Three — Poorly Known Taxa (DEC)

Scientific classification
- Kingdom: Plantae
- Clade: Tracheophytes
- Clade: Angiosperms
- Clade: Eudicots
- Clade: Asterids
- Order: Ericales
- Family: Ericaceae
- Genus: Styphelia
- Species: S. rectiloba

Binomial name
- Styphelia rectiloba Hislop

Species of flowering plants

Styphelia rectiloba is a species of flowering plant in the heath family Ericaceae and is endemic to a small area in the south of Western Australia. It is a spreading, compact shrub with hairy young branchlets, sharply-pointed egg-shaped leaves, and cream-coloured, tube-shaped flowers.

== Description ==
Styphelia rectiloba is a spreading, compact shrub with hairy young branchlets, that typically grows to up to 1.5 m (4 ft 11 in) high and wide. Its leaves are egg-shaped, 6–11 mm (0.24–0.43 in) long, 2.5–3.5 mm (0.098–0.138 in) wide and sharply pointed, on a petiole 0.5–1.0 mm (0.020–0.039 in) long. The flowers are arranged singly or in groups of up to 4 in leaf axils and are erect and sessile with egg-shaped bracts 0.7–1.2 mm (0.028–0.047 in) long and bracteoles 1.8–2.5 mm (0.071–0.098 in) long and 1.4–1.6 mm (0.055–0.063 in) wide. The sepals are narrowly egg-shaped, 3.8–4.5 mm (0.15–0.18 in) long and 1.4–1.7 mm (0.055–0.067 in) wide and greenish at first, later brown. The petals are cream-coloured and joined at the base to form a tube 3.4–4.2 mm (0.13–0.17 in) long and 1.3–1.6 mm (0.051–0.063 in) wide, with lobes that are turned back and 2.4–3.2 mm (0.094–0.126 in) long. Flowering has been observed between December and June, and the fruit is about 3.0–4.0 mm (0.12–0.16 in) long and 1.5–2.0 mm (0.059–0.079 in) wide.

== Taxonomy ==
Styphelia rectiloba was first formally described in 2019 by Michael Hislop in the journal Nuytsia from specimens he collected near Kambalda in 2013. The specific epithet (rectiloba) means "straight lobes".

== Distribution and habitat ==
This styphelia is only known from a few populations near Kambalda where it grows in open woodland or heath in rocky soils on or near granite breakaways in the Coolgardie bioregion of southern Western Australia.

== Conservation status ==
Styphelia rectiloba is listed as "Priority Three" by the Western Australian Government Department of Biodiversity, Conservation and Attractions, meaning that it is poorly known and known from only a few locations but is not under imminent threat.
