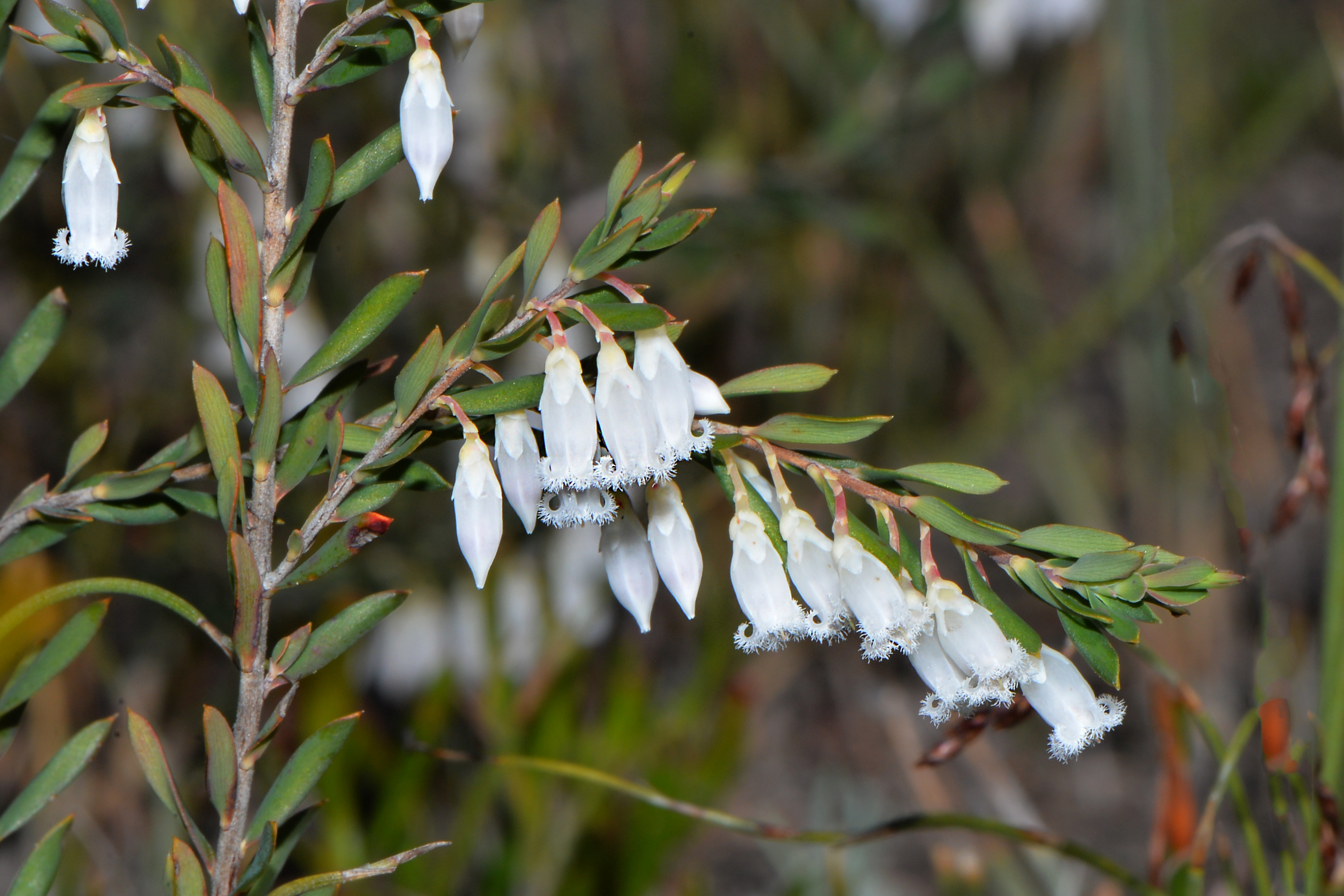

Scientific classification
- Kingdom: Plantae
- Clade: Tracheophytes
- Clade: Angiosperms
- Clade: Eudicots
- Clade: Asterids
- Order: Ericales
- Family: Ericaceae
- Genus: Styphelia
- Species: S. pendula

Binomial name
- Styphelia pendula (R.Br.) Spreng.
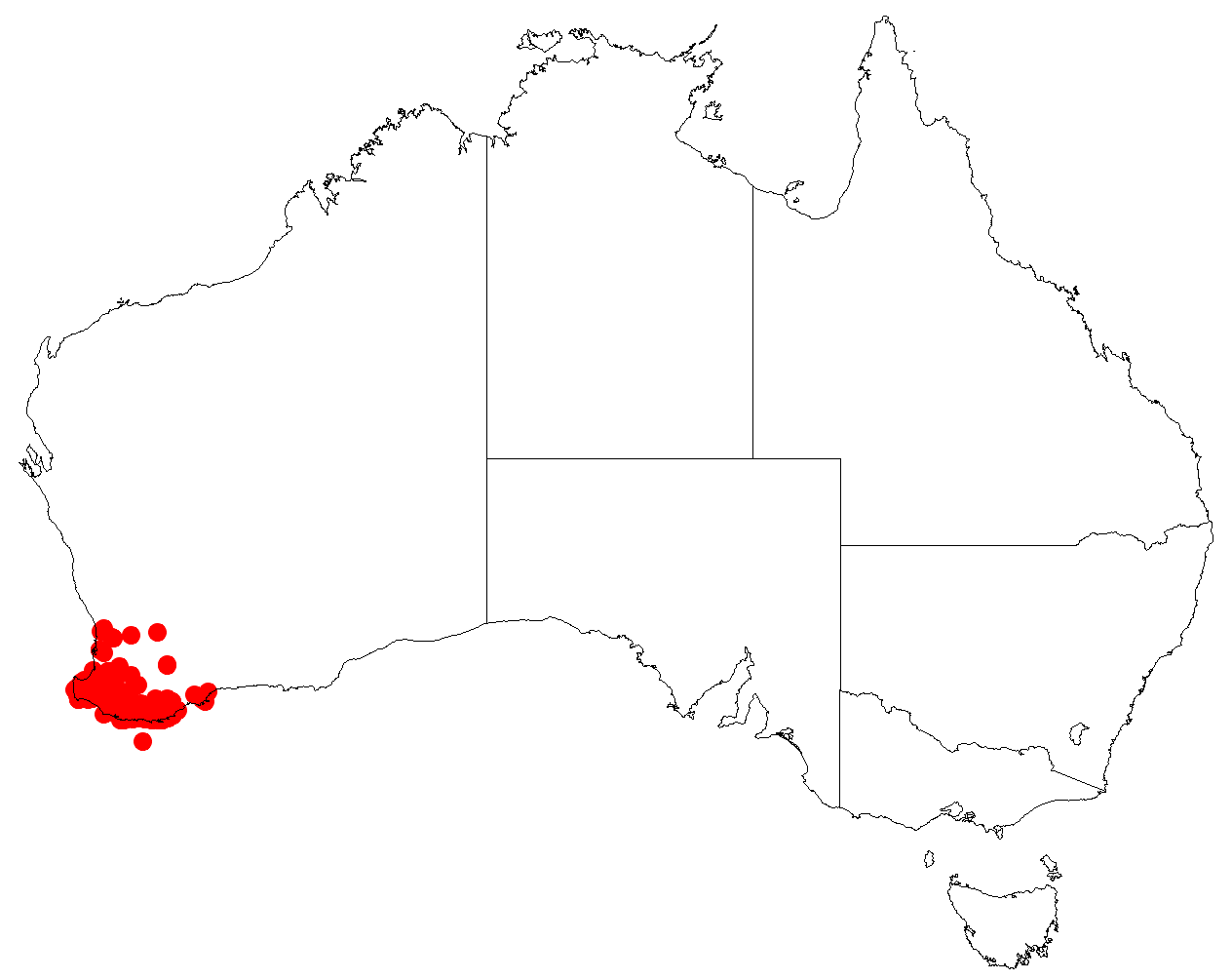
- Occurrence data from AVH

Synonyms
- Leucopogon pendulus R.Br.; Leucopogon secundiflorus Sond. nom. superfl.; Leucopogon pendulus var. cuspidatus Benth.; Leucopogon pendulus var. robustus E.Pritz.

= Styphelia pendula =

Species of plant

Styphelia pendula is a species of flowering plant in the heath family Ericaceae and is endemic to the south-west of Western Australia. It is an erect, straggling shrub with oblong leaves and white, tube-shaped flowers that are bearded inside.

== Description ==
Styphelia pendula is a bushy, erect, heath-like shrub that typically grows to a height of 0.9–1.2 m (2 ft 11 in – 3 ft 11 in) and has many glabrous or softly-hairy branches. Its leaves are mostly erect, oblong to linear, 4.2–8.5 mm (0.17–0.33 in) or rarely up to 12 mm (0.47 in) long and sometimes with a short, hard point on the tip. The flowers are pendulous and arranged singly or in pairs in leaf axils on a peduncle 2–4 mm (0.079–0.157 in) long with tiny bracts, and bracteoles less than half as long as the sepals at the base. The sepals are about 2 mm (0.079 in) long, the petals white and joined at the base, forming a tube about as long as the sepals, with lobes twice as long as the petal tube and bearded inside. Flowering occurs from March to October and the fruit is a drupe 2 or 3 times as long as the sepals.

== Taxonomy ==
This species was first formally described in 1810 by Robert Brown who gave it the name Leucopogon pendulus in his Prodromus Florae Novae Hollandiae et Insulae Van Diemen. In 1824, Kurt Polycarp Joachim Sprengel transferred the species to Styphelia as S. pendula in Systema Vegetabilium. The specific epithet, pendula means "hanging down" or "drooping", referring to the flowers and fruit.

== Distribution ==
This styphelia is found in the Avon Wheatbelt, Esperance Plains, Jarrah Forest, Mallee, Swan Coastal Plain and Warren bioregions of south-western Western Australia.

== Conservation status ==
Styphelia pendula is listed as "not threatened", by the Western Australian Government Department of Biodiversity, Conservation and Attractions.
