= Styphelia crassiflora =

Scientific classification
- Kingdom: Plantae
- Clade: Tracheophytes
- Clade: Angiosperms
- Clade: Eudicots
- Clade: Asterids
- Order: Ericales
- Family: Ericaceae
- Genus: Styphelia
- Species: S. crassiflora

Binomial name
- Styphelia crassiflora F.Muell.
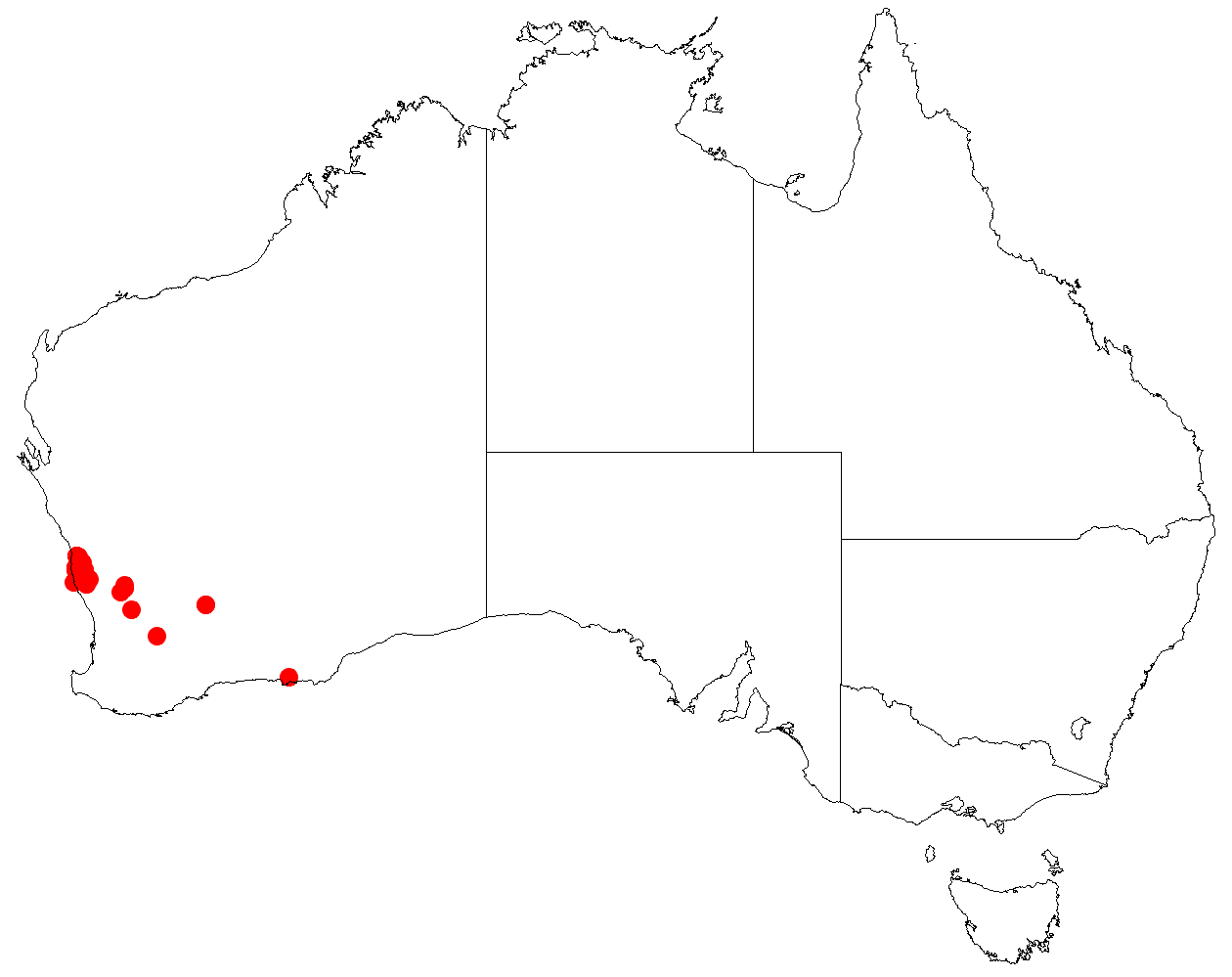
- Occurrence data from AVH

Synonyms
- Leucopogon crassiflorus (F.Muell.) Benth.

Species of plant

Styphelia crassiflora is a species of flowering plant in the heath family Ericaceae and is endemic to the south-west of Western Australia. It is an erect shrub with few branches and that typically grows to a height of 30–60 cm (12–24 in). Its leaves are broadly egg-shaped with the narrower end towards the base, to more or less round, 2–3 mm (0.079–0.118 in) long with a stem-clasping base. The flowers are borne singly or in pairs in upper leaf axils on a short peduncle, sometimes in small clusters, and with small bracts and bracteoles at the base. The sepals are about 4 mm (0.16 in) long and the petals about 6.5 mm (0.26 in) long, the petal lobes longer than the petal tube.

Styphelia crassiflora was first formally described in 1867 by Ferdinand von Mueller in Fragmenta Phytographiae Australiae. The specific epithet (crassiflora) means "thick-flowered".

This species occurs in the Avon Wheatbelt and Geraldton Sandplains bioregions of south-western Western Australia and is listed as "not threatened" by the Government of Western Australia Department of Biodiversity, Conservation and Attractions.
