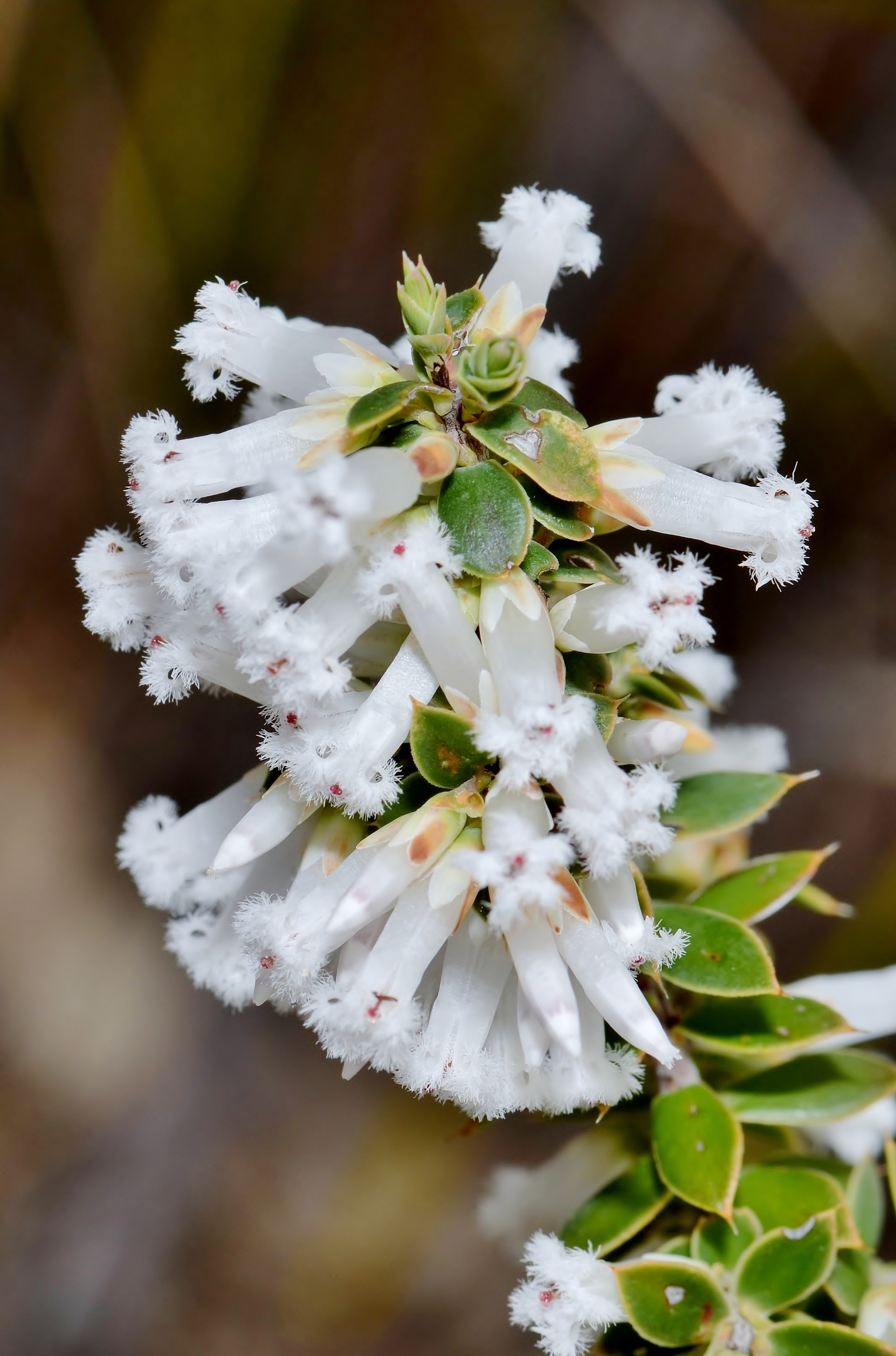

Scientific classification
- Kingdom: Plantae
- Clade: Tracheophytes
- Clade: Angiosperms
- Clade: Eudicots
- Clade: Asterids
- Order: Ericales
- Family: Ericaceae
- Genus: Styphelia
- Species: S. erubescens

Binomial name
- Styphelia erubescens F.Muell.
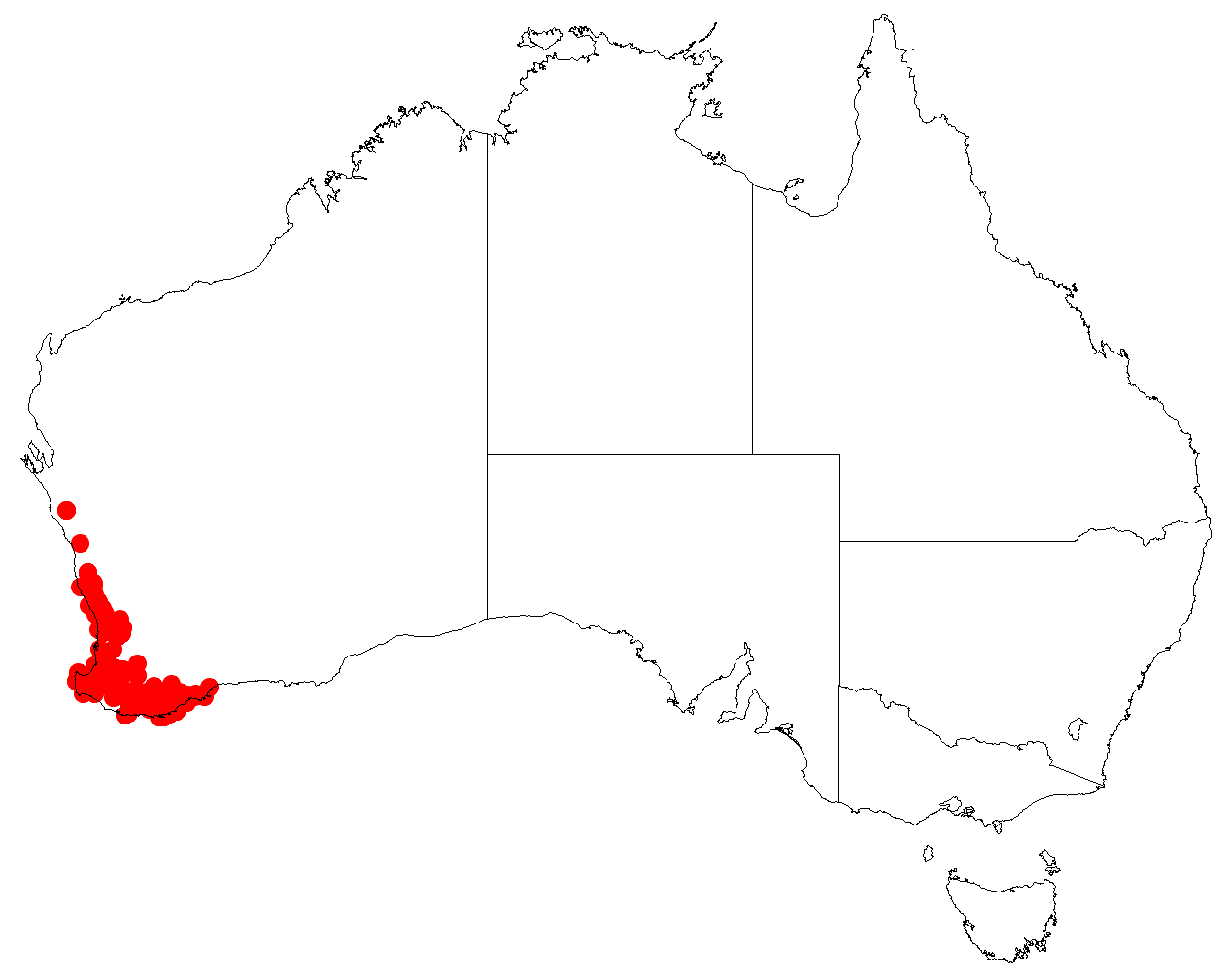
- Occurrence data from AVH

Synonyms
- List: Leucopogon rubicundus F.Muell.; Leucopogon oxycedrus var. brevifolius Benth.; Leucopogon racemulosus var. pauciflorus Sond.; Leucopogon rotundifolius var. oblongatus Sond.

= Styphelia erubescens =

Species of plant

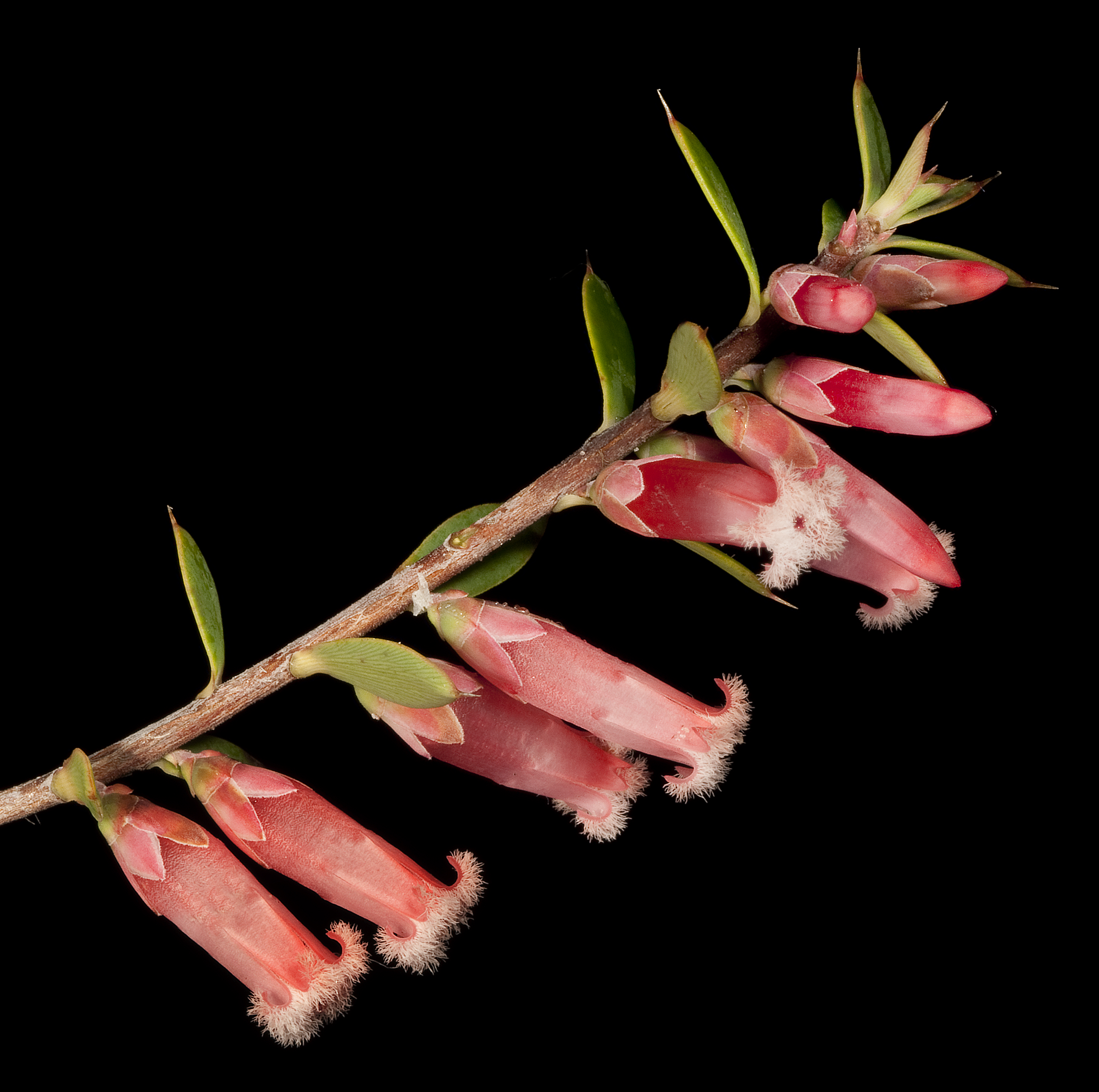
Red form on Bluff Knoll

Styphelia erubescens is a species of flowering plant in the heath family Ericaceae and is endemic to the south-west of Western Australia. It is an erect shrub with variably-shaped leaves with a small, sharp point on the tip, and white, pink or red, tube-shaped flowers.

== Description ==
Styphelia erubescens is an erect shrub that typically grows to a height of 0.1–1 m (3.9 in – 3 ft 3.4 in) and often has spreading branches. Its leaves are sessile, 6–12 mm (0.24–0.47 in) long, linear, oblong or lance-shaped, sometimes egg-shaped with the narrower end towards the base, but with a small, sharp point on the tip. The flowers are usually borne singly or pairs in leaf axils on a short peduncle with tiny bracts, and broad bracteoles less than half as long as the sepals. The sepals are about 3 mm (0.12 in) long, the petals white, pink or red, nearly 8 mm (0.31 in) long and joined at the base, forming a tube much longer than the sepals. Flowering occurs from March to December.

== Taxonomy ==
Styphelia erubescens was first described in 1867 by Ferdinand von Mueller in his Fragmenta phytographiae Australiae. The specific epithet (erubescens) means "reddening", referring to the colour of the flowers.

== Distribution and habitat ==
This styphelia occurs in a variety of soils in near-coastal sites, in wetland, and on hills, ridges and breakaways in the Avon Wheatbelt, Esperance Plains, Jarrah Forest, Mallee, Swan Coastal Plain and Warren bioregions of southern Western Australia.

== Conservation status ==
Styphelia erubescens is listed as "not threatened" by the Western Australian Government Department of Biodiversity, Conservation and Attractions.
