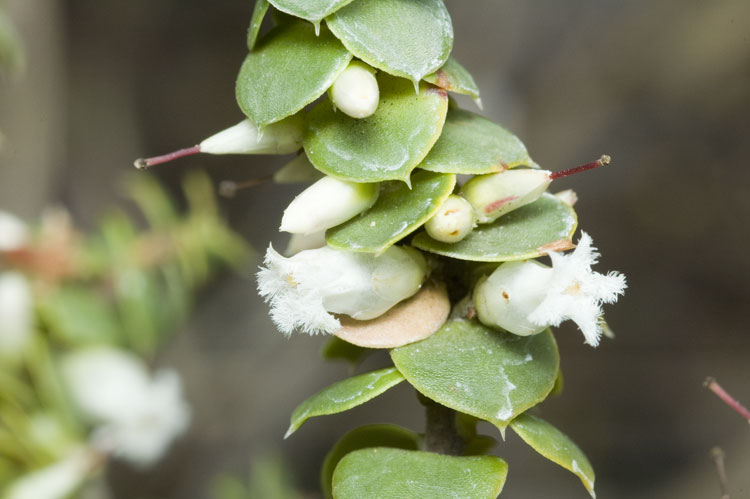
- In the Australian National Botanic Gardens

Scientific classification
- Kingdom: Plantae
- Clade: Tracheophytes
- Clade: Angiosperms
- Clade: Eudicots
- Clade: Asterids
- Order: Ericales
- Family: Ericaceae
- Genus: Styphelia
- Species: S. cordifolia

Binomial name
- Styphelia cordifolia (Lindl.) F.Muell.

Synonyms
- Leucopogon cordifolius Lindl.; Acrotriche latifolia A.Cunn. ex DC.; Leucopogon rotundifolius Sond. nom. illeg.; Styphelia rotundifolia F.Muell. nom. illeg.

= Styphelia cordifolia =

Species of plant

Styphelia cordifolia, commonly known as heart-leaved beard-heath, is a species of flowering plant in the heath family Ericaceae and is endemic to Australia. It is an erect shrub with broadly egg-shaped to round leaves, and white, tube-shaped flowers, the petals bearded on the inside.

== Description ==
Styphelia cordifolia is an erect shrub that typically grows to a height of 0.8–1.5 m (2 ft 7 in – 4 ft 11 in) and has softly-hairy branchlets. Its leaves are broadly egg-shaped to round, 3.5–7 mm (0.14–0.28 in) long and 4–8 mm (0.16–0.31 in) wide and curve downwards with a short bristle on the tip. The flowers are arranged in spikes 5.5–8.5 mm (0.22–0.33 in) long in leaf axils, each spike with up to three flowers with broadly egg-shaped to round bracteoles 1.8–2.3 mm (0.071–0.091 in) long at the base. The sepals are egg-shaped, 3–5 mm (0.12–0.20 in) long, the petals white and joined at the base to form a tube 2.8–4.1 mm (0.11–0.16 in) long, the lobes 2.4–2.8 mm (0.094–0.110 in) long and bearded on the inside.

== Taxonomy ==
Styphelia cordifolia was first formally described in 1838 by John Lindley and given the name Leucopogon cordifolius in Thomas Mitchell's journal, Three Expeditions into the interior of Eastern Australia. In 1873, Ferdinand von Mueller transferred the species to Styphelia as S. cordifolia in his Fragmenta Phytographiae Australiae. The specific epithet (cordifolia) means "heart-leaved".

== Distribution and habitat ==
Heart-leaved beard-heath grows in the understorey of woodland and in heathland in the far north-west of Victoria, the south-east of South Australia, and disjunctly in the Carnarvon, Geraldton Sandplains, Yalgoo bioregions in the west of Western Australia.
