= Styphelia rotundifolia =

Conservation status
- Priority Three — Poorly Known Taxa (DEC)

Scientific classification
- Kingdom: Plantae
- Clade: Tracheophytes
- Clade: Angiosperms
- Clade: Eudicots
- Clade: Asterids
- Order: Ericales
- Family: Ericaceae
- Genus: Styphelia
- Species: S. rotundifolia

Binomial name
- Styphelia rotundifolia (R.Br.) Spreng.
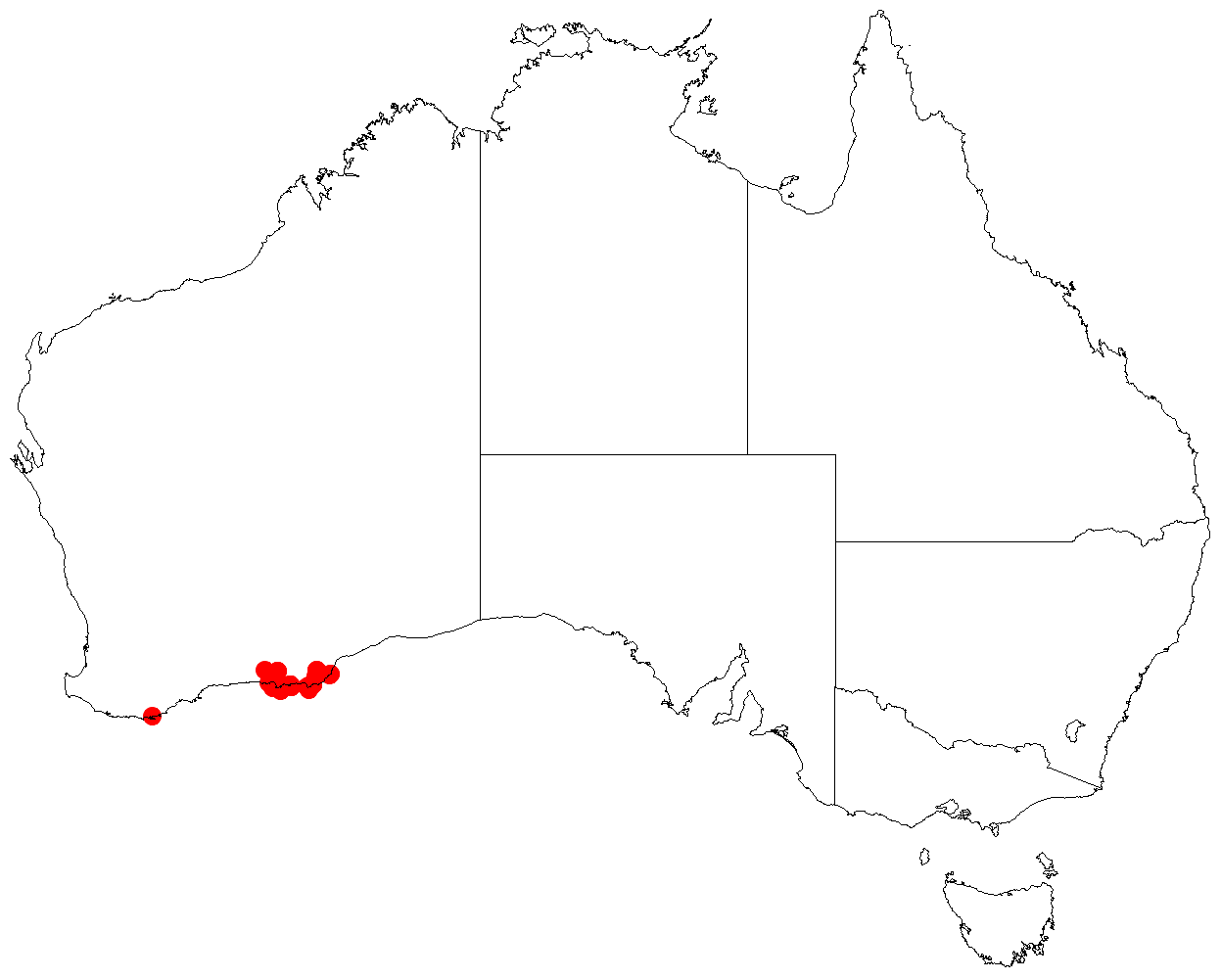
- Occurrence data from AVH

Synonyms
- Leucopogon rotundifolius R.Br.

Species of plant

Styphelia rotundifolia is a species of flowering plant in the heath family Ericaceae and is endemic to the south of Western Australia. It is an erect, bushy shrub with round or egg-shaped leaves, the narrower end towards the base, and white, tube-shaped flowers arranged in leaf axils in groups of 2 or 3.

== Description ==
Styphelia rotundifolia is an erect, bushy shrub that has erect or spreading, round to egg-shaped leaves with the narrower end towards the base, 6.3–8.5 mm (0.25–0.33 in) long on a short petiole. The base of the leaves is heart-shaped and there is often a small hard point on the tip. The flowers are borne in leaf axils in groups of 2 or 3 with tiny bracts, and bracteoles that are about half as long as the sepals. The sepals are 2.0–2.6 mm (0.079–0.102 in) long, the petals white, about 6.3 mm (0.25 in) long and joined at the base, the lobes about the same length as the petal tube.

== Taxonomy ==
This species was first formally described in 1810 by Robert Brown who gave it the name Leucopogon rotundifolius in his Prodromus Florae Novae Hollandiae et Insulae Van Diemen. In 1824, Kurt Polycarp Joachim Sprengel transferred the species to Styphelia as S. rotundifolia in Systema Vegetabilium. The specific epithet (rotundifolia) means "round-leaved".

== Distribution ==
Styphelia rotundifolia occurs in the Esperance Plains and Mallee bioregions of south-western Western Australia.

== Conservation status ==
Styphelia rotundifolia is listed as "Priority Three" by the Government of Western Australia Department of Biodiversity, Conservation and Attractions, meaning that it is poorly known and known from only a few locations, but is not under imminent threat.
