= Styphelia concinna =

Scientific classification
- Kingdom: Plantae
- Clade: Tracheophytes
- Clade: Angiosperms
- Clade: Eudicots
- Clade: Asterids
- Order: Ericales
- Family: Ericaceae
- Genus: Styphelia
- Species: S. concinna

Binomial name
- Styphelia concinna (Benth.) F.Muell.
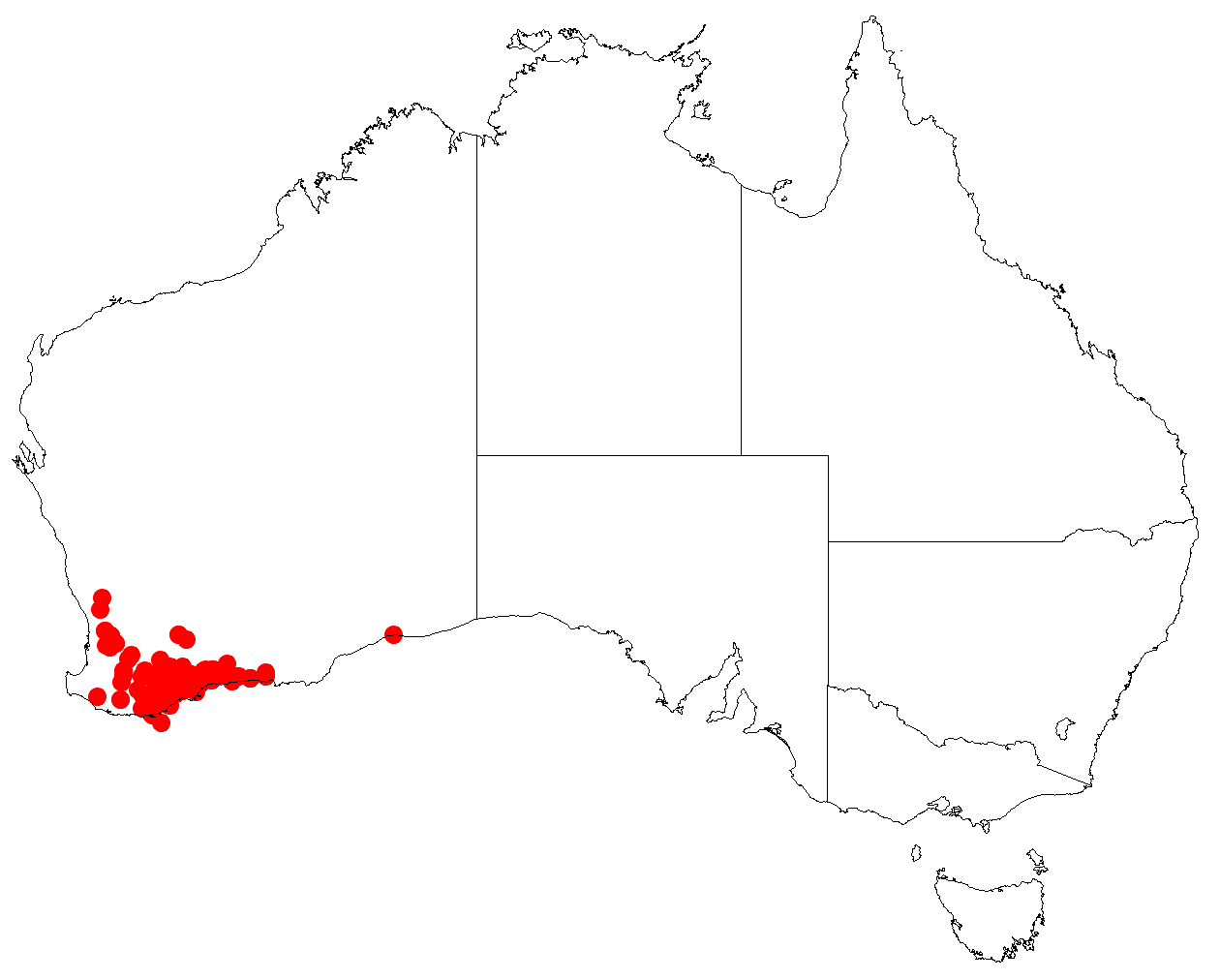
- Occurrence data from AVH

Synonyms
- Leucopogon concinnus Benth.

Species of plant

Styphelia concinna is a species of flowering plant in the heath family Ericaceae and is endemic to the south-west of Western Australia. It is a low-lying shrub with many branches. Its leaves are egg-shaped or oblong, 2–4 mm (0.079–0.157 in) long with a small point on the end and the ends rolled under. The flowers are arranged singly or in pairs in leaf axils on a short peduncle. The sepals, petal tube and petal lobes are about 2 mm (0.079 in) long.

The species was first formally described in 1868 by George Bentham who gave it the name Leucopogon concinnus in Flora Australiensis. In 1882, Ferdinand von Mueller transferred the species to Styphelia as S. concinna in his Systematic Census of Australian Plants. The specific epithet (concinna) means "neat" or "pretty".

Styphelia concinna occurs in the Avon Wheatbelt, Esperance Plains, Jarrah Forest and Mallee bioregions of south-western Western Australia and is listed as "not threatened" by the Government of Western Australia Department of Biodiversity, Conservation and Attractions.
