= Styphelia piliflora =

Scientific classification
- Kingdom: Plantae
- Clade: Tracheophytes
- Clade: Angiosperms
- Clade: Eudicots
- Clade: Asterids
- Order: Ericales
- Family: Ericaceae
- Genus: Styphelia
- Species: S. piliflora

Binomial name
- Styphelia piliflora Crayn

Species of shrub

Styphelia piliflora is a species of flowering plant in the family Ericaceae and is endemic to Queensland. It was first formally described in 2019 by Darren Crayn in Australian Systematic Botany from specimens collected by Bernard Hyland in 1980. The specific epithet (piliflora) refers to the long, soft hairs on the outside of the petal tube. This species is endemic to Queensland and is listed as of "least concern" by the Queensland Government Department of Environment and Science.
