= Styphelia striata =

Scientific classification
- Kingdom: Plantae
- Clade: Tracheophytes
- Clade: Angiosperms
- Clade: Eudicots
- Clade: Asterids
- Order: Ericales
- Family: Ericaceae
- Genus: Styphelia
- Species: S. striata

Binomial name
- Styphelia striata (R.Br.) Spreng.

Synonyms
- Leucopogon striatus R.Br.; Leucopogon nervosus R.Br.; Leucopogon rupestris Sond.

Species of shrub

Styphelia striata is a species of flowering plant in the heath family Ericaceae and is endemic to the south of Western Australia. It is an erect to spreading shrub with egg-shaped leaves and white, tube-shaped flowers arranged in dense spikes on the ends of branches and in upper leaf axils.

== Description ==
Styphelia striata is an erect to spreading shrub that typically grows up to 60 cm (24 in) high and has many branches. The leaves are egg-shaped 3–6 mm (0.12–0.24 in) long, thick, blunt and ribbed on the lower surface. The flowers are borne in spikes on the ends of branches and in upper leaf axils with bracts and bracteoles are about half the length of the sepals. The sepals are about 2 mm (0.079 in) long, and the petals are white, less than 4 mm (0.16 in) long and joined at the base forming a tube with lobes about the same length as the petal tube. Flowering occurs from July to November.

== Taxonomy ==
This species was first formally described in 1810 by Robert Brown who gave it the name Leucopogon striatus in his Prodromus Florae Novae Hollandiae et Insulae Van Diemen. In 1824, Kurt Polycarp Joachim Sprengel transferred the species to Styphelia as S. striata. The specific epithet (striata) means "striated", referring to the leaves.

== Distribution and habitat ==
This species grows in sandy soil in the Esperance Plains bioregion of southern Western Australia.

== Conservation status ==
Styphelia striata is listed (as Leucopogon striatus) as "not threatened" by the Government of Western Australia Department of Biodiversity, Conservation and Attractions.
