= Styphelia racemulosa =

Scientific classification
- Kingdom: Plantae
- Clade: Tracheophytes
- Clade: Angiosperms
- Clade: Eudicots
- Clade: Asterids
- Order: Ericales
- Family: Ericaceae
- Genus: Styphelia
- Species: S. racemulosa

Binomial name
- Styphelia racemulosa DC.
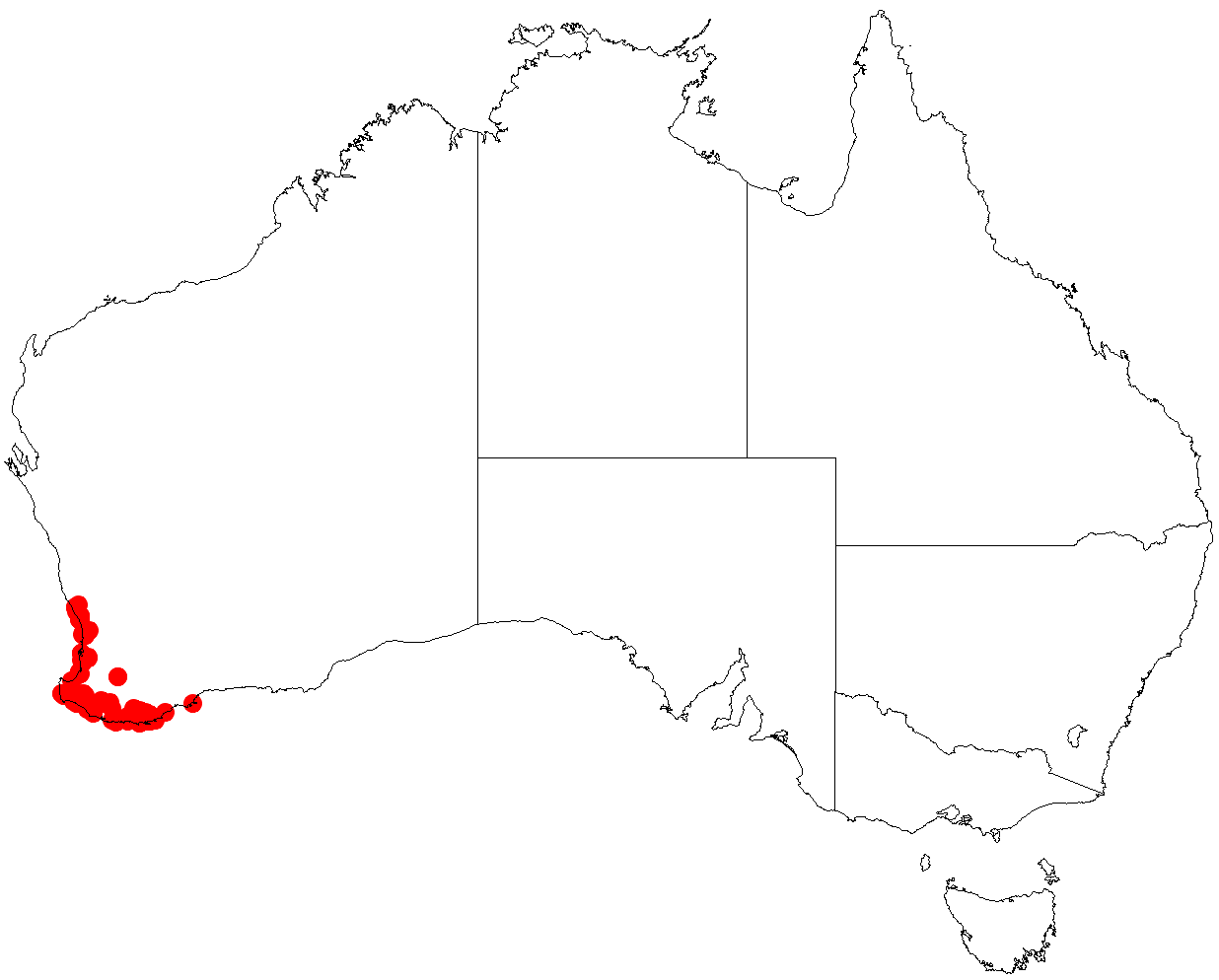
- Occurrence data from AVH

Synonyms
- Leucopogon racemulosus DC.

Species of plant

Styphelia racemulosa is a species of flowering plant in the heath family Ericaceae and is endemic to the south-west of Western Australia. It is an erect, rigid shrub with linear leaves and white, tube-shaped flowers usually arranged in pairs or threes in leaf axils.

== Description ==
Styphelia racemulosa is an erect, rigid shrub that typically grows to a height of up to 0.6 m (2 ft 0 in). Its leaves are rigid, linear to lance-shaped, 12–25 mm (0.47–0.98 in) long with the edges rolled under, and a rigid point on the end. The flowers are borne in leaf axils in groups of 2 to 5, on a short peduncle with small bracts, and bracteoles less than one-third as long as the sepals. The sepals are less than 2 mm (0.079 in) long, the petals white and joined at the base, forming a tube 4.2 mm (0.17 in) long, the lobes 6.6 mm (0.26 in) long and only rolled back near the tip.

== Taxonomy ==
This species was first formally described in 1839 by Augustin Pyramus de Candolle who gave it the name Leucopogon racemulosus in his Prodromus Systematis Naturalis Regni Vegetabilis from specimens collected by James Drummond near the Swan River Colony. In 1867, Ferdinand von Mueller transferred the species to Styphelia as S. racemolusa in his Fragmenta Phytographiae Australiae. The specific epithet (racemulosa) means "small raceme".

== Distribution ==
Styphelia racemulosa is found in the Jarrah Forest, Swan Coastal Plain and Warren bioregions of south-western Western Australia.

== Conservation status ==
This species is listed as "not threatened" by the Government of Western Australia Department of Biodiversity, Conservation and Attractions.
