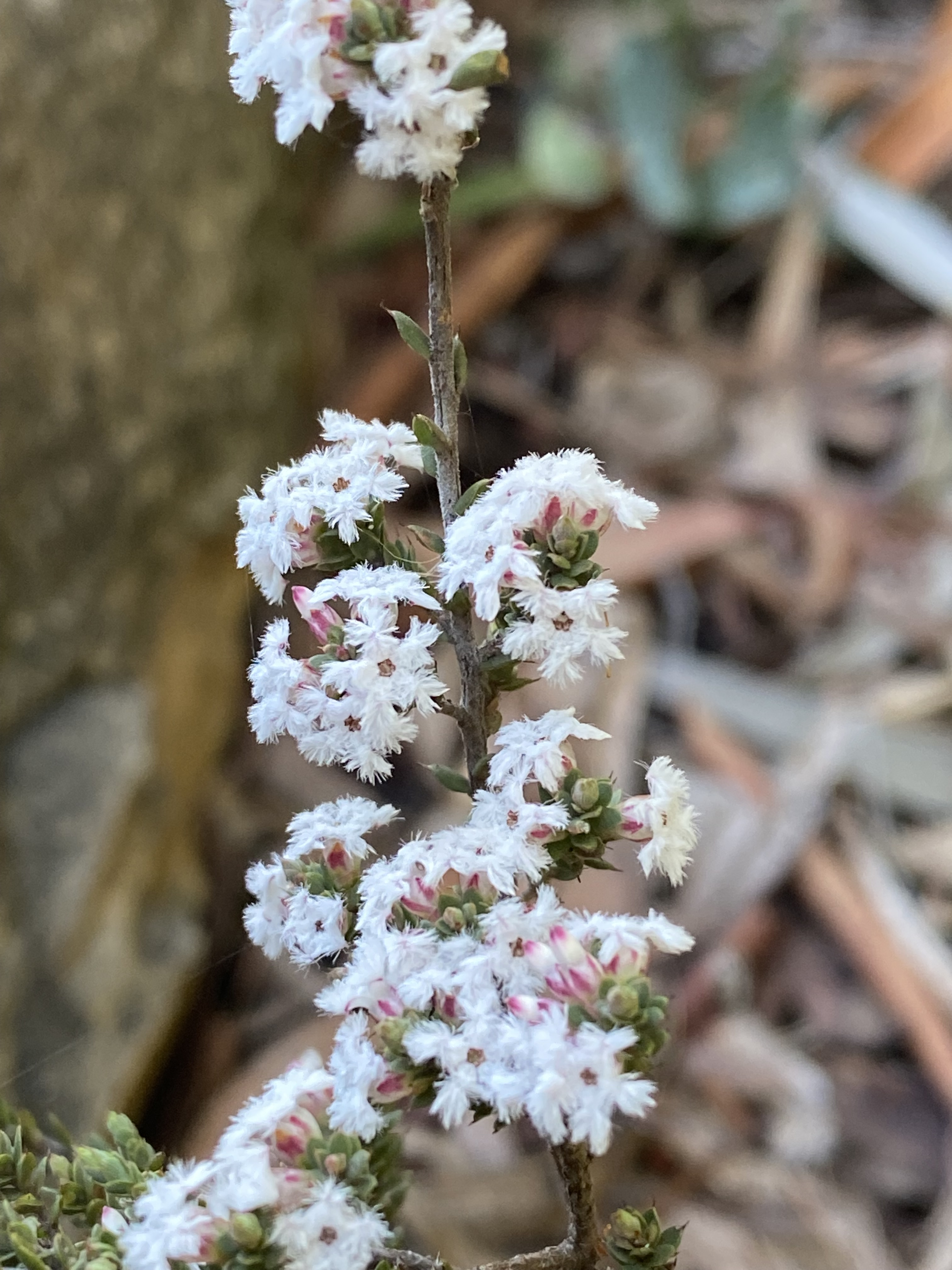

Scientific classification
- Kingdom: Plantae
- Clade: Tracheophytes
- Clade: Angiosperms
- Clade: Eudicots
- Clade: Asterids
- Order: Ericales
- Family: Ericaceae
- Genus: Styphelia
- Species: S. attenuata

Binomial name
- Styphelia attenuata (A.Cunn.) F.Muell.

Synonyms
- Leucopogon attenuatus A.Cunn.; Leucopogon mucronatus DC.; Leucopogon ramulosus A.Cunn. ex DC.; Leucopogon reclinatus A.Cunn. ex DC.; Leucopogon reclinatus var. oblongifolius DC.; Leucopogon recurvatus A.Cunn. ex DC.

= Styphelia attenuata =

Grey beard-heath

Species of plant

Styphelia attenuata, commonly known as grey beard-heath, is a species of flowering plant in the family Ericaceae. It has grey-green leaves and small white flowers and grows in New South Wales and the Australian Capital Territory.

== Description ==
Styphelia attenuata is a dense shrub usually 20–60 cm (7.9–23.6 in) high and the branchlets have soft, short hairs. The grey-green leaves sit erect or upwardly against the stem, linear or oval shaped, 2–7.2 mm (0.079–0.283 in) long and 0.9–2.1 mm (0.035–0.083 in) wide, upper surface convex in cross section, 3 parallel veins on the underside, margins curved downward with small teeth, and stiff, upright hairs, and the leaf tapering to a small point. The white flowers sit upright in groups of 1-3 in upper leaf axils, bracteoles 1.1–1.4 mm (0.043–0.055 in) long and hairy, sepals 1.9–2.4 mm (0.075–0.094 in) long and the floral tube 1.6–2.1 mm (0.063–0.083 in) long with soft hairs inside and lobes 1.5–2 mm (0.059–0.079 in) long. Flowering occurs from in winter to early spring and the fruit is a small, fleshy brown-green and berry-like, oval-shaped to 3 mm (0.12 in) long, ribbed and smooth.

== Taxonomy and naming ==
This species was first formally described in 1825 by Allan Cunningham who gave it the name Leucopogon attenuatus in Geographical Memoirs on New South Wales. In 1882, Ferdinand von Mueller transferred the species to Styphelia as S. attenuata in Systematic Census of Australian Plants. The specific epithet (attenuata) means "narrowing to a point".

== Distribution and habitat ==
Grey beard-heath grows in dry, rocky slopes in woodlands and heath on sandy soils in south-eastern Queensland, on the coast, ranges and western slopes of New South Wales and the Australian Capital Territory, and in eastern Victoria.
