= Styphelia intertexta =

Scientific classification
- Kingdom: Plantae
- Clade: Tracheophytes
- Clade: Angiosperms
- Clade: Eudicots
- Clade: Asterids
- Order: Ericales
- Family: Ericaceae
- Genus: Styphelia
- Species: S. intertexta

Binomial name
- Styphelia intertexta George

Species of shrub

Styphelia intertexta is a species of flowering plant in the family Ericaceae and is endemic to southern Western Australia. It is a much-branched shrub with woolly-hairy branchlets, narrowly triangular to linear, sharply pointed leaves, and white flowers with turned-back lobes that are bearded inside.

== Description ==
Styphelia intertexta is a much-branched shrub that typically grows to a height of 1 m (3 ft 3 in), its branchlets covered with short, woolly hairs. Its leaves are narrowly triangular to linear, 3–9 mm (0.12–0.35 in) long and sessile with a sharp point on the tip. The edges of the leaves are curved downwards, glabrous on the upper surface with woolly hairs between ribs on the lower surface. The flowers are arranged in pairs with small bracts and broad egg-shaped bracteoles 1 mm (0.039 in) long at the base. The sepals are about 3.0–3.5 mm (0.12–0.14 in) long and the petals white, 7–9 mm (0.28–0.35 in) long, forming a tube with lobes longer than the petal tube and bearded on the inner surface. Flowering occurs from May to July, and the fruit is an oval drupe containing a single seed.

== Taxonomy ==
Styphelia intertexta was first formally described in 1968 by Alex George in the Journal of the Royal Society of Western Australia from specimens he collected 9 mi (14 km) north of Ravensthorpe in 1963. The specific epithet (intertexta) means "woven between", referring to the interlocking hairs on the lower surface of the leaves.

== Distribution ==
This styphelia grows in the Esperance Plains and Mallee bioregions of southern Western Australia.
