= Styphelia blepharolepis =

Conservation status
- Priority Four — Rare Taxa (DEC)

Scientific classification
- Kingdom: Plantae
- Clade: Embryophytes
- Clade: Tracheophytes
- Clade: Spermatophytes
- Clade: Angiosperms
- Clade: Eudicots
- Clade: Asterids
- Order: Ericales
- Family: Ericaceae
- Genus: Styphelia
- Species: S. blepharolepis

Binomial name
- Styphelia blepharolepis F.Muell.
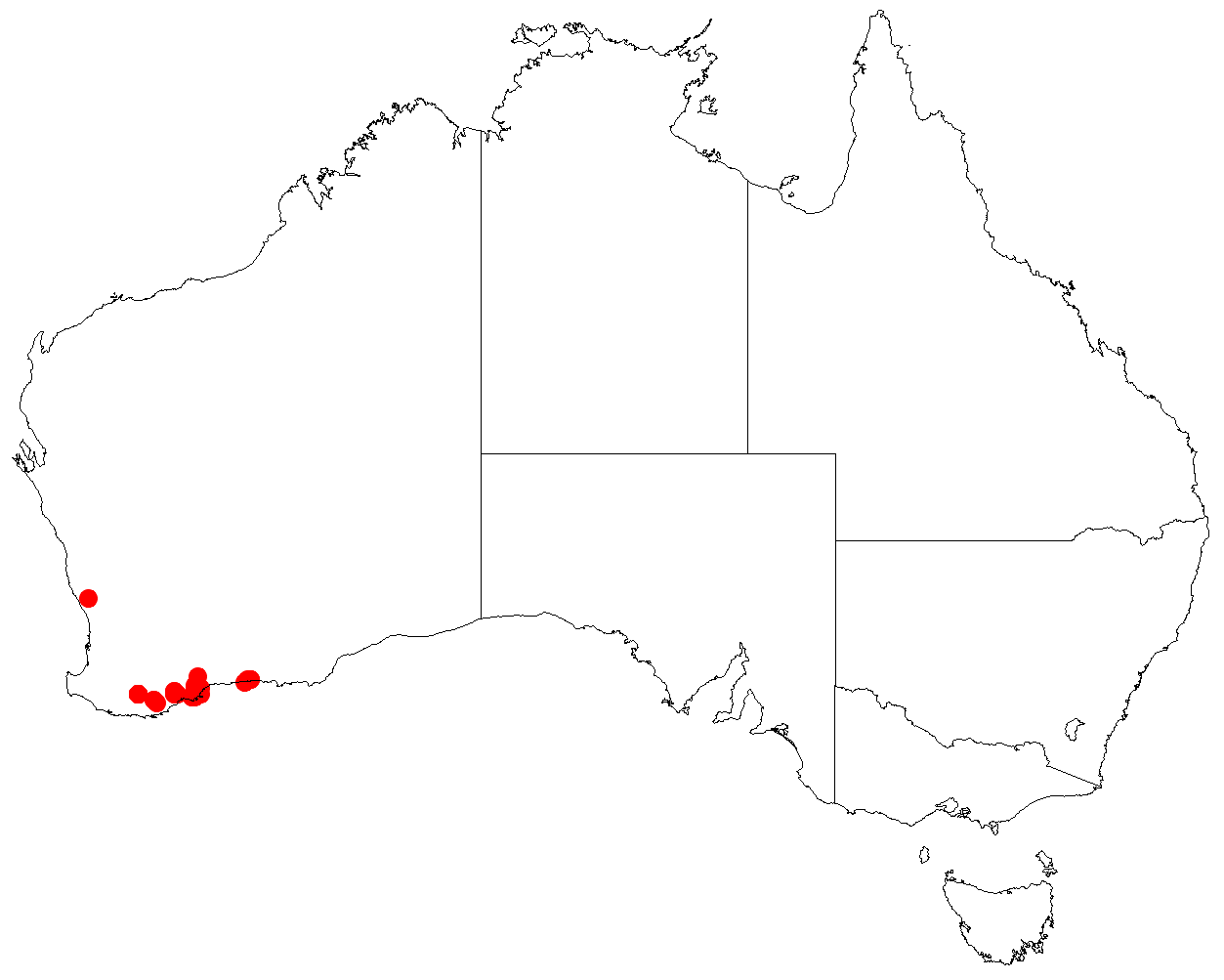
- Occurrence data from AVH

Synonyms
- Leucopogon blepharolepis (F.Muell.) Benth.

Species of plant

Styphelia blepharolepis is a species of flowering plant in the heath family Ericaceae and is endemic to the south-west of Western Australia. It is an erect shrub with sharply-pointed, oblong to lance-shaped leaves and small flowers in racemes of two to five in leaf axils with small bracts and bracteoles about 1 mm (0.039 in) long. The sepals are about 2 mm (0.079 in) long and the petals are joined at the base forming an urn shape about 4 mm (0.16 in) long with lobes longer than the petal tube.

It was first formally described in 1868 by Ferdinand von Mueller in his Fragmenta Phytographiae Australiae. The specific epithet (blepharolepis) means "eye-lash scale", referring to scales near the ovary.

This species occurs in the Esperance plains, Jarrah Forest and Mallee bioregions of the south-west of Western Australia and is listed as "Priority Four" by the Government of Western Australia Department of Biodiversity, Conservation and Attractions, meaning that it is rare or near threatened.
