= Styphelia quartzitica =

Conservation status
- Priority Two — Poorly Known Taxa (DEC)

Scientific classification
- Kingdom: Plantae
- Clade: Tracheophytes
- Clade: Angiosperms
- Clade: Eudicots
- Clade: Asterids
- Order: Ericales
- Family: Ericaceae
- Genus: Styphelia
- Species: S. quartzitica

Binomial name
- Styphelia quartzitica Hislop

Species of shrub

Styphelia quartzitica is a species of flowering plant in the heath family Ericaceae and is endemic to a small area in the south of Western Australia. It is an erect shrub with hairy young branchlets, sharply-pointed, linear or very narrowly egg-shaped leaves, and cream-coloured, tube-shaped flowers.

== Description ==
Styphelia quartzitica is an erect shrub with hairy young branchlets, that typically grows to up to 60 cm (24 in) high and 40 cm (16 in) wide. Its leaves are linear to very narrowly egg-shaped, 7–14 mm (0.28–0.55 in) long, 0.8–1.5 mm (0.031–0.059 in) wide on a petiole 0.3–0.8 mm (0.012–0.031 in) long and sharply pointed. The flowers are usually arranged singly in leaf axils and are widely spreading and sessile with broadly egg-shaped bracts 0.4–0.6 mm (0.016–0.024 in) long and bracteoles 1.0–1.3 mm (0.039–0.051 in) long and 1.0–1.4 mm (0.039–0.055 in) wide. The sepals are narrowly egg-shaped, 2.8–3.6 mm (0.11–0.14 in) long and 1.2–1.3 mm (0.047–0.051 in) wide and pale greenish to straw-coloured. The petals are cream-coloured and joined at the base to form a tube 3.0–4.5 mm (0.12–0.18 in) long and 1.7–2.2 mm (0.067–0.087 in) wide, with lobes that are turned back and 2.0–2.5 mm (0.079–0.098 in) long. Flowering mostly occurs between March and May, sometimes longer.

== Taxonomy ==
Styphelia quartzitica was first formally described in 2019 by Michael Hislop in the journal Nuytsia from specimens he collected in the Fitzgerald River National Park in 2016. The specific epithet (quartzitica) means "belonging to quartz".

== Distribution and habitat ==
This styphelia is restricted to the upper slopes of hills and mountains in remote parts of the Fitzgerald River National Park where it grows in the understorey of dense heath in the Esperance Plains bioregion of southern Western Australia.

== Conservation status ==
Styphelia quartzitica is listed as "Priority Two" by the Western Australian Government Department of Biodiversity, Conservation and Attractions, meaning that it is poorly known and from only one or a few locations.
