= Styphelia imbricata =

Scientific classification
- Kingdom: Plantae
- Clade: Tracheophytes
- Clade: Angiosperms
- Clade: Eudicots
- Clade: Asterids
- Order: Ericales
- Family: Ericaceae
- Genus: Styphelia
- Species: S. imbricata

Binomial name
- Styphelia imbricata (R.Br.) Spreng.
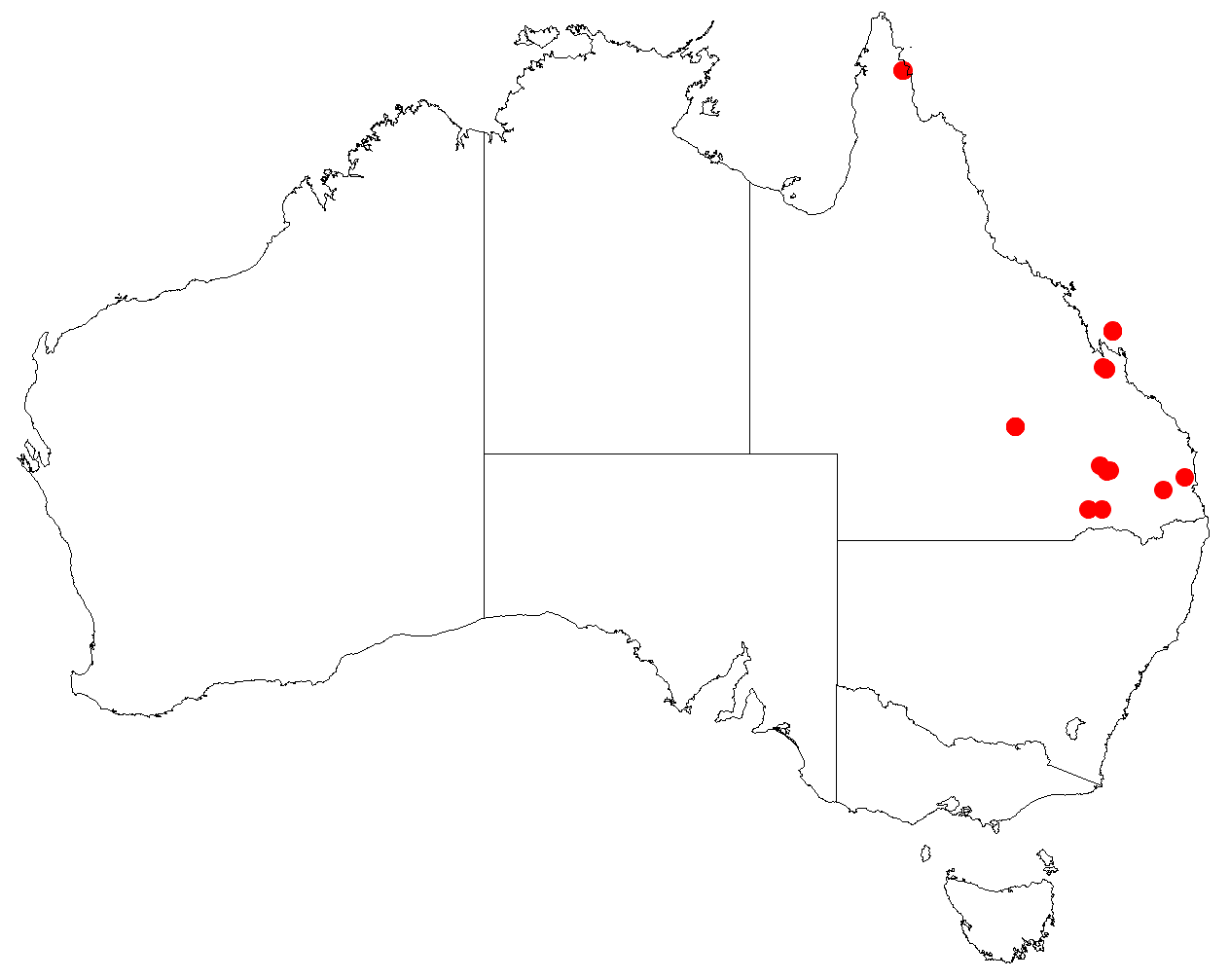
- Occurrence data from AVH

Synonyms
- Leucopogon imbricatus (R.Br.)

Species of shrub

Styphelia imbricata is a species of flowering plant in the family Ericaceae and is endemic to south-east Queensland. It is an erect shrub with glabrous branches, crowded, often overlapping, egg-shaped leaves, and white, bell-shaped flowers that are bearded inside.

== Description ==
Styphelia imbricata is an erect shrub that typically grows to a height of about 45 cm (18 in) and has widely-spreading, glabrous branches. Its leaves are sessile, egg-shaped with the narrower end towards the base and less than 13 mm (0.51 in) long. The leaves are crowded, often overlapping, and have a fine sharp point on the rounded tip. The flowers are arranged in leaf axils on a short peduncle with small bracts and broad bracteoles less than half as long as the sepals. The sepals are about 3 mm (0.12 in) long and the petals white, forming a bell-shaped tube about as long as the sepals, with lobes about as long as the petal tube.

== Taxonomy ==
This species was first formally described in 1810 by Robert Brown who gave it the name Leucopogon imbricatus in his Prodromus Florae Novae Hollandiae et Insulae Van Diemen. In 1824, Kurt Polycarp Joachim Sprengel transferred the species to Sprengelia and gave it the name S. imbricata. The specific epithet (imbricata) means "imbricate".

== Distribution ==
This styphelia grows in south-east Queensland.
