= Styphelia brevicuspis =

Conservation status
- Priority Two — Poorly Known Taxa (DEC)

Scientific classification
- Kingdom: Plantae
- Clade: Tracheophytes
- Clade: Angiosperms
- Clade: Eudicots
- Clade: Asterids
- Order: Ericales
- Family: Ericaceae
- Genus: Styphelia
- Species: S. brevicuspis

Binomial name
- Styphelia brevicuspis (Benth.) F.Muell.
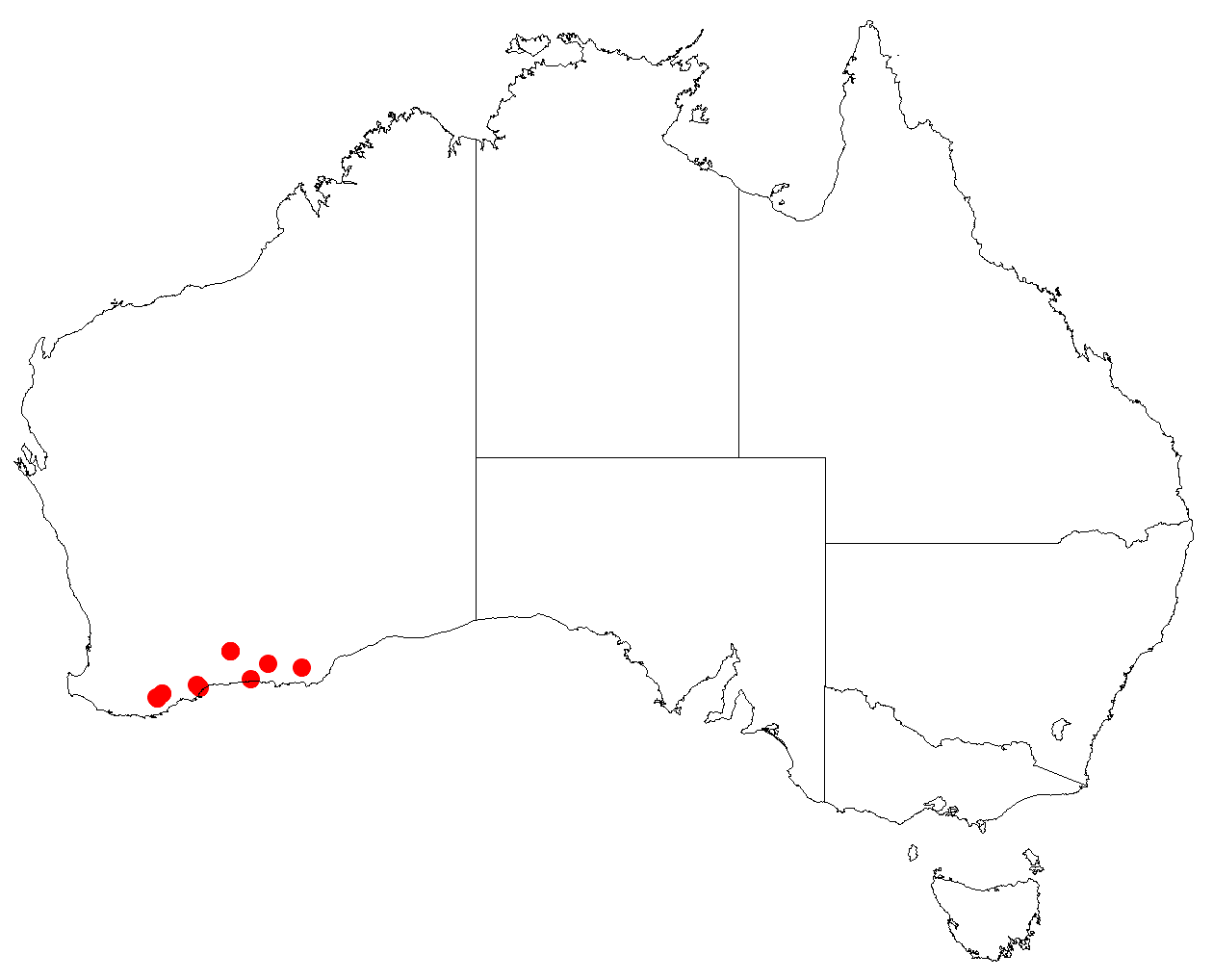
- Occurrence data from AVH

Synonyms
- Leucopogon brevicuspis Benth.

Species of plant

Styphelia brevicuspis is a species of flowering plant in the heath family Ericaceae and is endemic to the south-west of Western Australia. It is an erect, bushy shrub with oblong leaves with a small point on the tip, mostly about 1 mm (0.039 in) long. The flowers are arranged in groups of two or three in leaf axils with small bracts and bracteoles about half as long as the sepals. The sepals are about 4.2 mm (0.17 in) long and softly-hairy, the petal tube about the same length as the sepals but the petal lobes shorter than the petal tube.

It was first formally described in 1868 by George Bentham in Flora Australiensis. In 1882, Ferdinand von Mueller transferred the species to Styphelia as S. brevicuspis in the Systematic Census of Australian Plants. The specific epithet (brevicuspis) means "short point".

This species occurs in the Jarrah Forest bioregion of the south-west of Western Australia and is listed as "Priority Two" by the Western Australian Government Department of Biodiversity, Conservation and Attractions, meaning that it is poorly known and from only one or a few locations.
