= Styphelia subulata =

Scientific classification
- Kingdom: Plantae
- Clade: Tracheophytes
- Clade: Angiosperms
- Clade: Eudicots
- Clade: Asterids
- Order: Ericales
- Family: Ericaceae
- Genus: Styphelia
- Species: S. subulata

Binomial name
- Styphelia subulata (F.Muell.) Hislop, Crayn & Puente-Lel.

Synonyms
- Leucopogon subulatus F.Muell.

Species of shrub

Styphelia subulata is a species of flowering plant in the heath family Ericaceae and is endemic to the south-west of Western Australia. It is a rigid shrub with many branches, usually sharply-pointed, linear leaves and usually one or two white, tube-shaped flowers in leaf axils.

== Description ==
Styphelia subulata is a rigid, scrubby shrub that typically grows to a height of about 60 cm (24 in), and has many branches. The leaves are usually linear, 6.5–8.6 mm (0.26–0.34 in) long, the edges rolled under, and sharply pointed. The flowers are usually arranged singly or in pairs in leaf axils on a very short peduncle, with very small bracts and bracteoles less than half the length of the sepals. The sepals are about 2 mm (0.079 in) long, the petals white and joined at the base to form a tube about the same length as the sepals, with lobes longer than the petal tube.

== Taxonomy ==
This species was first formally described in 1864 by Ferdinand von Mueller who gave it the name Leucopogon subulatus in his Fragmenta Phytographiae Australiae, from specimens collected near the Great Australian Bight by George Maxwell. In 2020, Michael Hislop, Darren Crayn and Caroline Puente-Lelievre transferred the species to Styphelia as S. subulata in Australian Systematic Botany. The specific epithet (subulata) means "awl-shaped".

== Distribution ==
Styphelia subulata is found in the Avon Wheatbelt, Coolgardie, Esperance Plains and Mallee bioregions of south-western Western Australia.
