= Styphelia angustiflora =

Conservation status
- Priority Two — Poorly Known Taxa (DEC)

Scientific classification
- Kingdom: Plantae
- Clade: Tracheophytes
- Clade: Angiosperms
- Clade: Eudicots
- Clade: Asterids
- Order: Ericales
- Family: Ericaceae
- Genus: Styphelia
- Species: S. angustiflora

Binomial name
- Styphelia angustiflora Hislop & Puente-Lel.

Species of plant

Styphelia angustiflora is a species of flowering plant in the heath family Ericaceae and is endemic to a small area near York, in the south-west of Western Australia. It is an erect, compact shrub with sharply-pointed, narrowly egg-shaped leaves and white, tube-shaped flowers.

== Description ==
Styphelia angustiflora is an erect shrub that typically grows to about 0.8 m (2 ft 7 in) high and 1 m (3 ft 3 in) wide, its branchlets hairy. The leaves are narrowly egg-shaped, 5.0–12 mm (0.20–0.47 in) long and 1.3–3.0 mm (0.051–0.118 in) wide on a petiole 0.3–0.6 mm (0.012–0.024 in) long. The leaves are directed upwards and have a sharp point on the tip. The flowers are sessile and mostly arranged singly in leaf axils, with egg-shaped to round bracts 1.4–2.0 mm (0.055–0.079 in) long and egg-shaped to elliptic bracteoles 2.6–4.7 mm (0.10–0.19 in) long at the base. The sepals are narrowly elliptic, 6.5–9.2 mm (0.26–0.36 in) long and the petals white, forming a tube 6.2–7.8 mm (0.24–0.31 in) long with lobes 5.0–5.7 mm (0.20–0.22 in) long, the inner surface hairy. Flowering mainly occurs from August to early October and the fruit is 2.3–2.5 mm (0.091–0.098 in) long with three to five ridges.

== Taxonomy ==
Styphelia angustiflora was first formally described in 2019 by Michael Clyde Hislop and Caroline Puente-Lelievre in the journal Nuytsia from specimens collected south-west of York in 1997. The specific epithet (angustiflora) means "narrow-flowered".

== Distribution and habitat ==
This styphelia grows in woodland in a small area south-west of York, in the Jarrah Forest bioregion of south-western Western Australia.

== Conservation status ==
Styphelia angustiflora is classified as "Priority Two" by the Western Australian Government Department of Biodiversity, Conservation and Attractions, meaning that it is poorly known and from only one or a few locations.
