= Styphelia deserticola =

Conservation status
- Priority Two — Poorly Known Taxa (DEC)

Scientific classification
- Kingdom: Plantae
- Clade: Tracheophytes
- Clade: Angiosperms
- Clade: Eudicots
- Clade: Asterids
- Order: Ericales
- Family: Ericaceae
- Genus: Styphelia
- Species: S. deserticola

Binomial name
- Styphelia deserticola Hislop

Species of plant

Styphelia deserticola is a species of flowering plant in the heath family Ericaceae and is endemic to inland Western Australia. It is an erect shrub with sharply-pointed, narrowly egg-shaped leaves and white or pale cream-coloured, tube-shaped flowers usually arranged in groups of 2 or 3 in leaf axils.

== Description ==
Styphelia deserticola is an erect shrub that typically grows to a 90 cm (35 in) high and wide. The leaves are narrowly egg-shaped, 5–9.5 mm (0.20–0.37 in) long, 1.0–2.1 mm (0.039–0.083 in) wide, the edges curved down and sharply-pointed on a petiole 0.3–0.6 mm (0.012–0.024 in) long. The flowers are usually arranged in groups of 2 or 3 in leaf axils, with bracts 0.5–0.7 mm (0.020–0.028 in) long and egg-shaped bracteoles 0.9–1.2 mm (0.035–0.047 in) long at the base. The sepals are egg-shaped or narrowly egg-shaped, 2.0–2.6 mm (0.079–0.102 in) long, pale greenish to straw-coloured. The petals are white or pale cream-coloured, and joined at the base to form a tube 1.2–2.0 mm (0.047–0.079 in) long, the lobes 3.2–4.5 mm (0.13–0.18 in) long and bearded inside. Flowering occurs between March and August and the fruit is an elliptic drupe 4.4–6.0 mm (0.17–0.24 in) long.

== Taxonomy and naming ==
Styphelia deserticola was first formally described in 2020 by Michael Hislop in the journal Swainsona from specimens collected in the Great Victoria Desert in 2010. The specific epithet (deserticola) means "desert-inhabitant".

== Distribution and habitat ==
This styphelia grows in the Great Victoria Desert and areas further east in the Coolgardie and Great Victoria Desert bioregions of inland Western Australia.

== Conservation status ==
Styphelia deserticola is classified as "Priority Two" by the Western Australian Government Department of Biodiversity, Conservation and Attractions, meaning that it is poorly known and from only one or a few locations.
