= Styphelia melaleucoides =

Scientific classification
- Kingdom: Plantae
- Clade: Tracheophytes
- Clade: Angiosperms
- Clade: Eudicots
- Clade: Asterids
- Order: Ericales
- Family: Ericaceae
- Genus: Styphelia
- Species: S. melaleucoides

Binomial name
- Styphelia melaleucoides F.Muell.

Species of plant

Styphelia melaleucoides is a species of flowering plant in the heath family Ericaceae and is endemic to the south west of Western Australia. It is an upright, spreading shrub with egg-shaped to almost round leaves and white, tube-shaped flowers bearded inside.

== Description ==
Styphelia melaleucoides is an upright, spreading shrub that typically grows up to a height of 0.25–1.5 m (9.8 in – 4 ft 11.1 in) and sometimes has minutely, softly-hairy branches. Its leaves are egg-shaped to heart-shaped or almost round, 6.5–10.5 mm (0.26–0.41 in) long, flat or concave with a small hard point on the tip. The flowers are arranged singly or in pairs in leaf axils, on a short peduncle with very small bracts and broad bracteoles about 1 mm (0.039 in) long at the base. The sepals are 2.0–2.7 mm (0.079–0.106 in) long, the petals white and joined at the base to form a tube about 6.5 mm (0.26 in) long, with lobes as long as the petal tube, turned strongly back, and bearded inside.

== Taxonomy and naming ==
Styphelia melaleucoides was first formally described in 1864 by Ferdinand von Mueller in his Fragmenta Phytographiae Australiae. The specific epithet (melaleucoides) means "Melaleuca-like".

== Distribution ==
This styphelia grows on rises, undulating plains and breakaways in the Esperance Plains and Mallee bioregions of southern Western Australia.

== Conservation status ==
Styphelia melaleucoides is listed as "not threatened" by the Government of Western Australia Department of Biodiversity, Conservation and Attractions.
