= Styphelia anomala =

Conservation status
- Priority Two — Poorly Known Taxa (DEC)

Scientific classification
- Kingdom: Plantae
- Clade: Embryophytes
- Clade: Tracheophytes
- Clade: Angiosperms
- Clade: Eudicots
- Clade: Asterids
- Order: Ericales
- Family: Ericaceae
- Genus: Styphelia
- Species: S. anomala

Binomial name
- Styphelia anomala Hislop

Species of plant

Styphelia anomala is a species of flowering plant in the heath family Ericaceae and is endemic to a small area in the south-west of Western Australia. It is an erect shrub with spirally arranged, erect, narrowly egg-shaped to narrowly elliptic leaves and cream-coloured, tube-shaped flowers and cylindrical to very narrowly oval fruit.

== Description ==
Styphelia anomala is an erect shrub that typically grows up to about 80 cm (31 in) high and 40 cm (16 in) wide, its young branchlets covered with very short hairs. The leaves are spirally arranged, erect, narrowly egg-shaped with the narrower end towards the base, or narrowly elliptic, occasionally elliptic, 2.0–4.8 mm (0.079–0.189 in) long and 1.0–1.5 mm (0.039–0.059 in) wide on a petiole 0.5–1.0 mm (0.020–0.039 in) long. The upper surface of the leaves sometimes has a few hairs but the lower surface is glabrous, paler than the upper surface and shiny, with three prominent main veins. The flowers are borne singly in leaf axils with bract-like 'early seasonal leaves' that are very different from regular leaves. There are no bracts, but broadly egg-shaped bracteoles 1.0–1.4 mm (0.039–0.055 in) long and 0.8–1.0 mm (0.031–0.039 in) wide. The sepals are egg-shaped or narrowly egg-shaped, 2.2–2.7 mm (0.087–0.106 in) long and the petals cream-coloured, and form a tube 1.8–2.2 mm (0.071–0.087 in) long, the lobes cream-coloured, 2.0–3.0 mm (0.079–0.118 in) long. The anthers protrude beyond the petal tube, but not beyond the bases of the lobes. Flowering has been observed in October and November, and the fruit is cylindrical to very narrowly oval, sometimes more or less curved, 3.8–4.2 mm (0.15–0.17 in) long and 1.0–1.2 mm (0.039–0.047 in) wide.

== Taxonomy ==
Styphelia anomala was first formally described in 2022 by Michael Hislop in the Nuytsia, from specimens he collected north-east of Lake King in 2006. The specific epithet (anomala) means 'anomalous' or 'abnormal', referring to the "highly unusual configuration of the inflorescence".

== Distribution and habitat ==
This styphelia is currently only known from a small area near Lake King, where it grows in sandy loam in low heath in the Mallee bioregion in the south-west of Western Australia.

== Conservation status ==
Styphelia anomala is listed as "Priority Two" by the Government of Western Australia Department of Biodiversity, Conservation and Attractions, meaning that it is poorly known and from one or a few locations.
