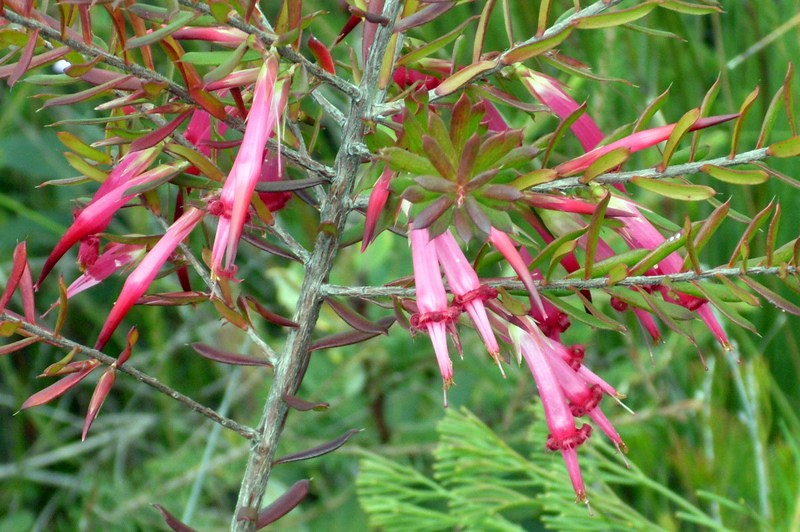
- Styphelia tubiflora

Scientific classification
- Kingdom: Plantae
- Clade: Embryophytes
- Clade: Tracheophytes
- Clade: Angiosperms
- Clade: Eudicots
- Clade: Asterids
- Order: Ericales
- Family: Ericaceae
- Subfamily: Epacridoideae
- Tribe: Styphelieae
- Genus: Styphelia; Sm. (1793)

Synonyms
- Astroloma R.Br. (1810); Coleanthera Stschegl. (1859); Croninia J.W.Powell (1993); Mesotriche Stschegl. (1859); Michiea F.Muell. (1864); Pentataphrus Schltdl. (1847); Phanerandra Stschegl. (1859); Soleniscia DC. (1839); Stomarrhena DC. (1839); Ventenatia Cav. (1798), nom. rej.

= Styphelia =

Genus of flowering plants in the heath family

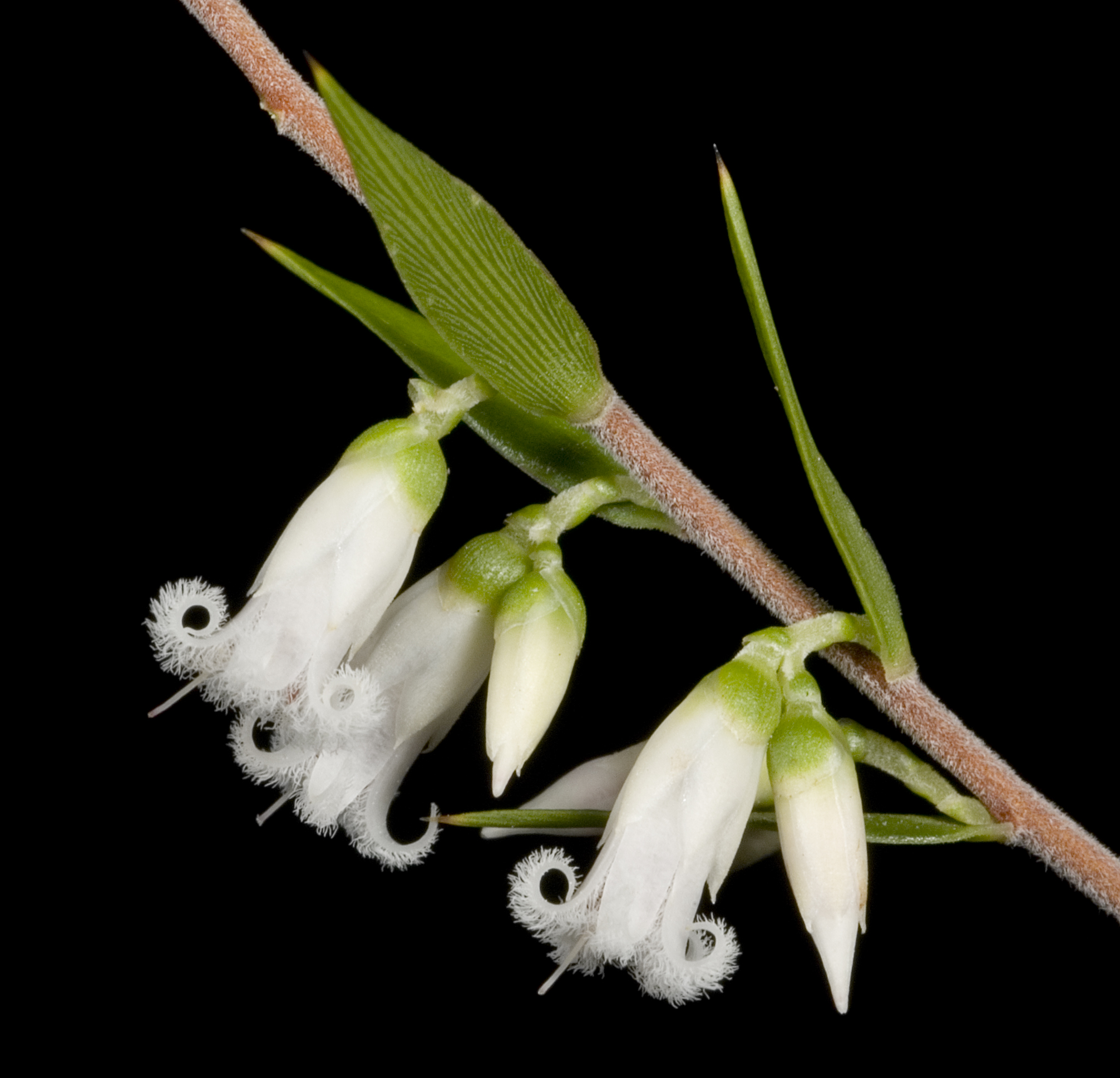
Styphelia conostephioides

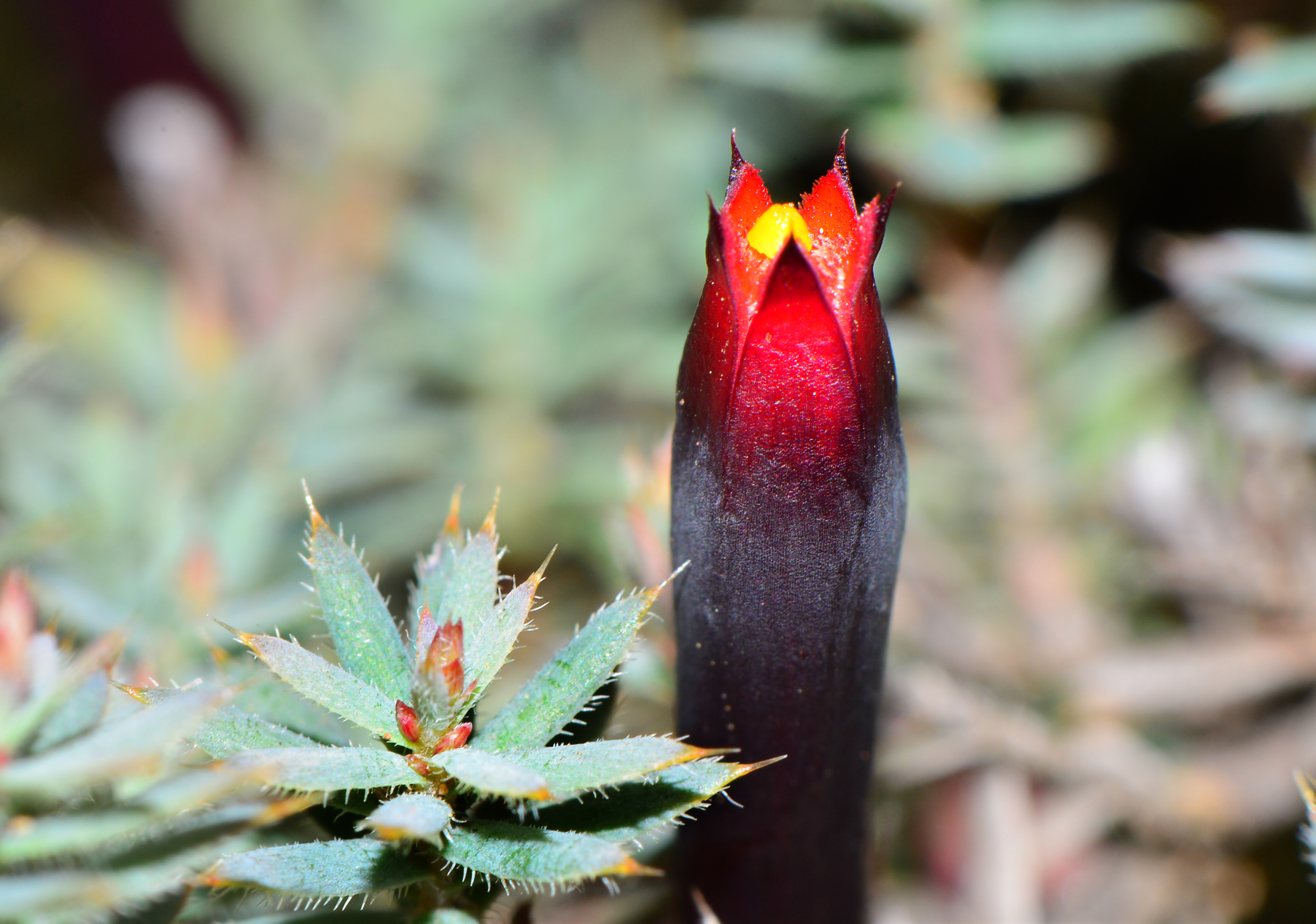
Styphelia discolor

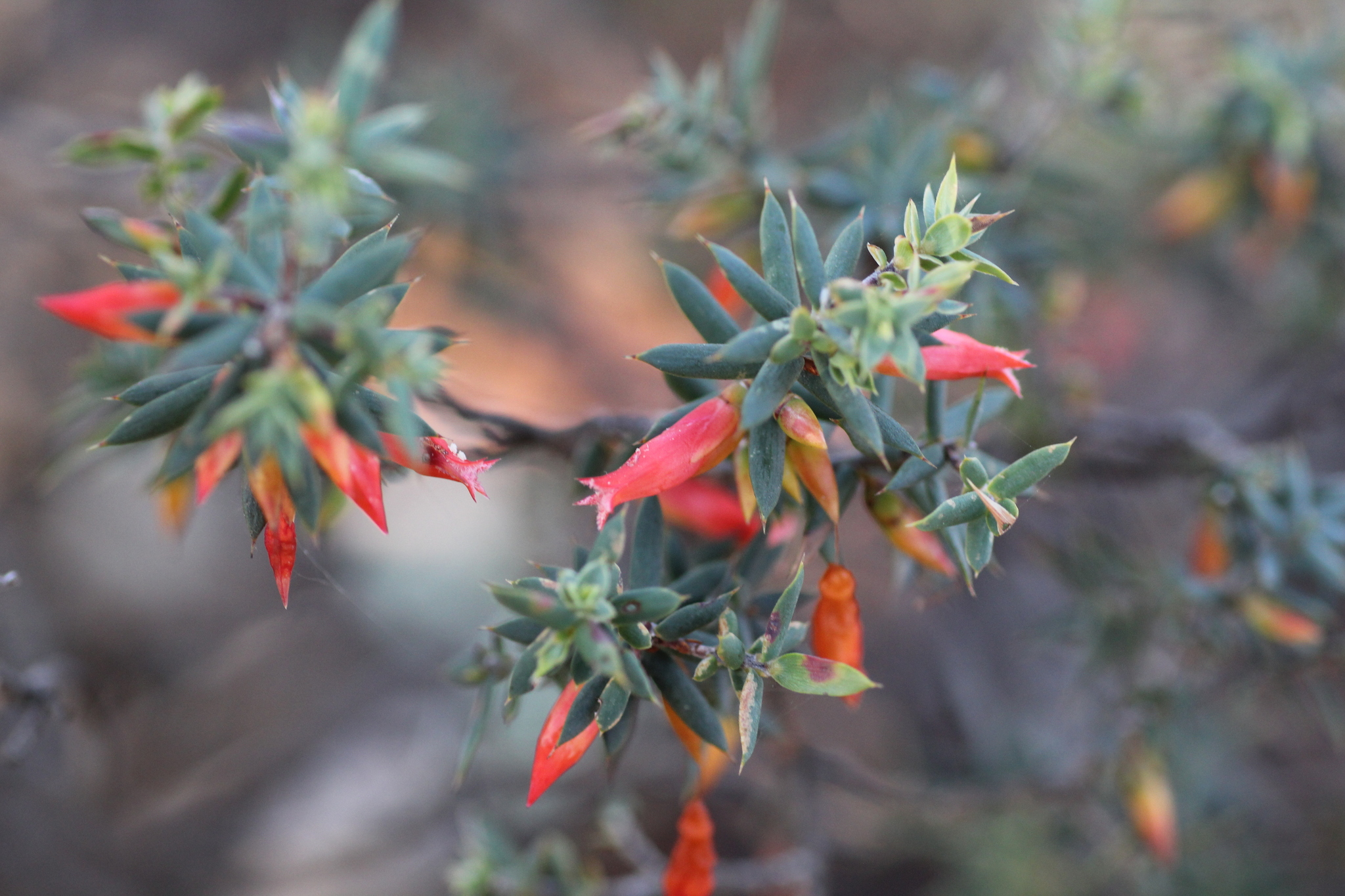
Styphelia epacridis

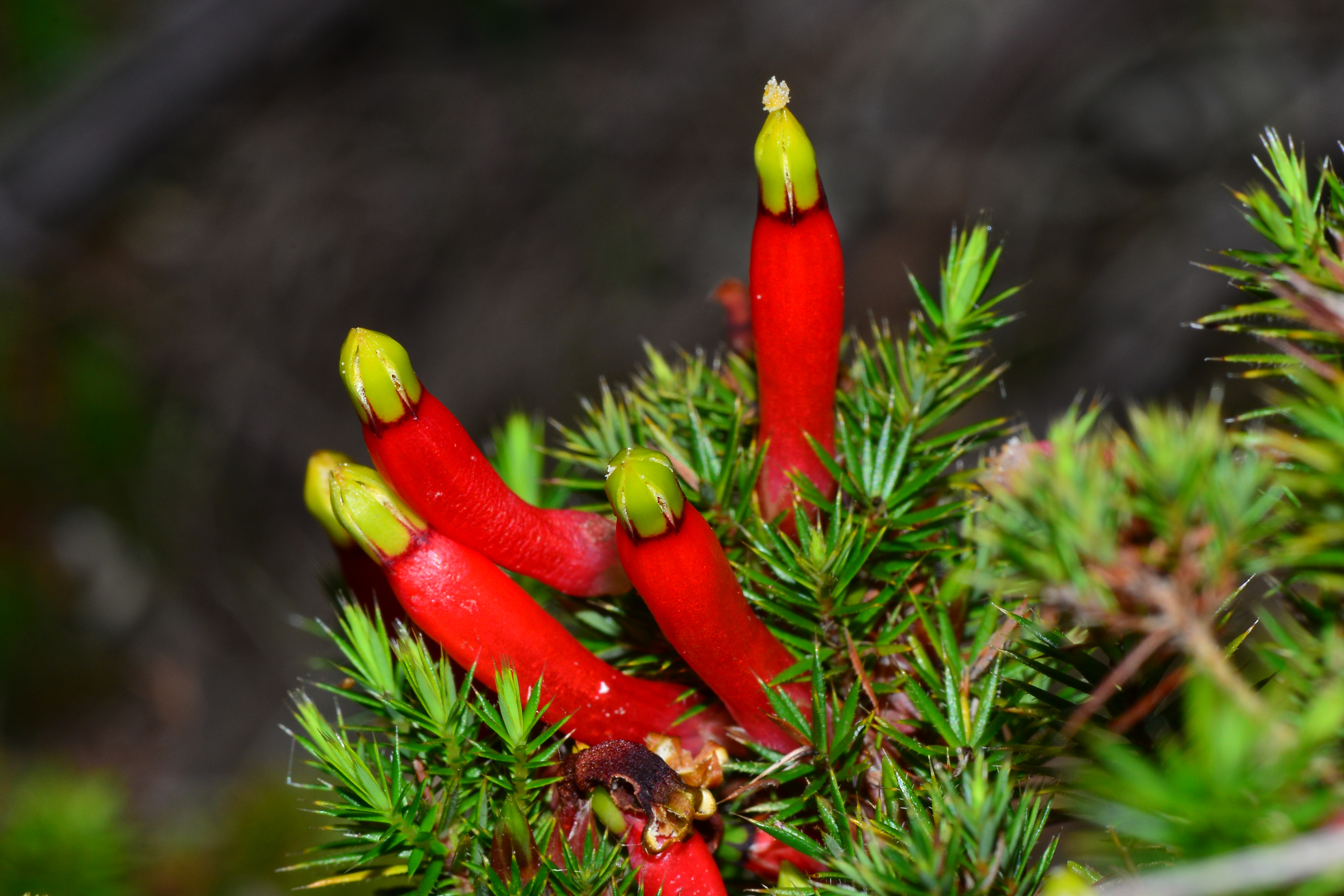
Styphelia foliosa

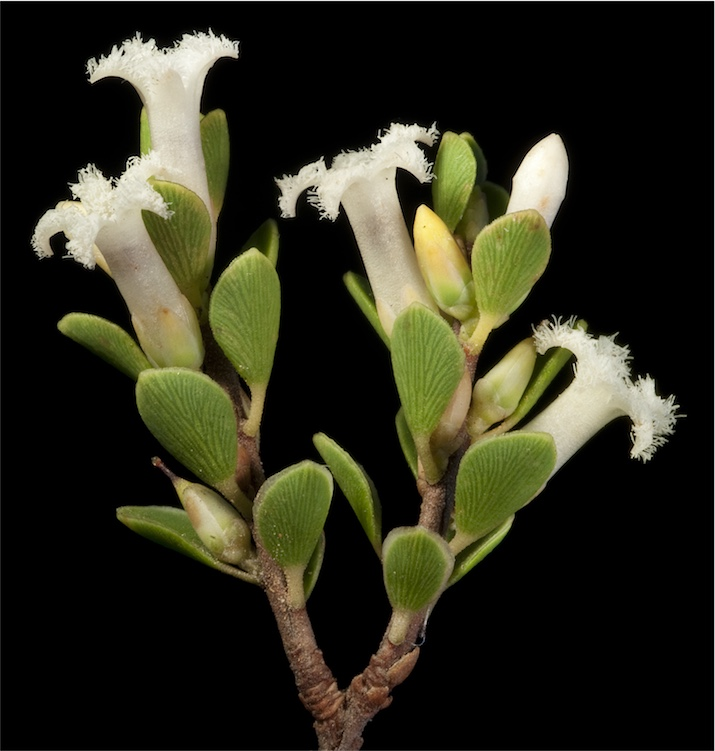
Styphelia lissanthoides

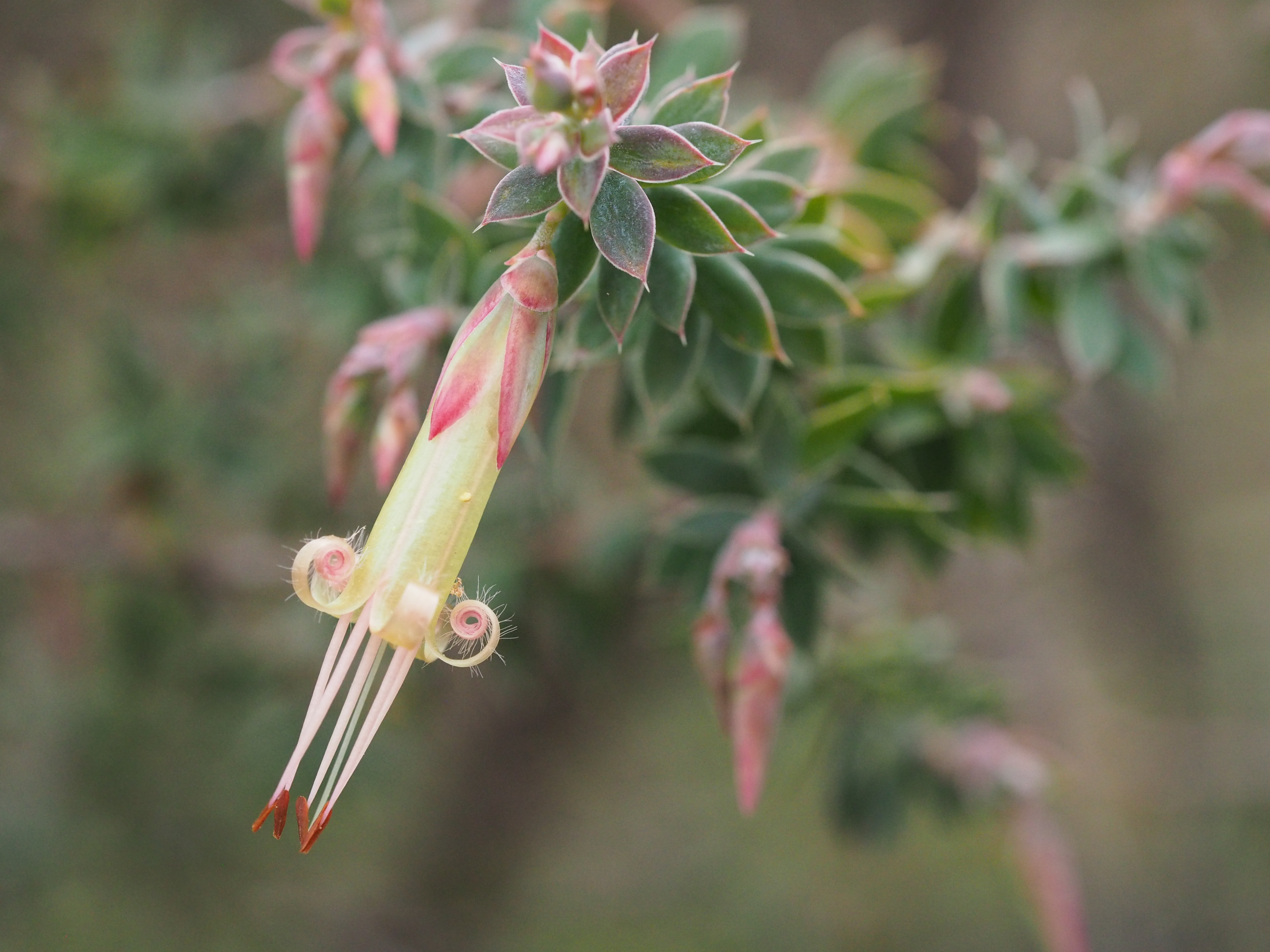
Styphelia perileuca

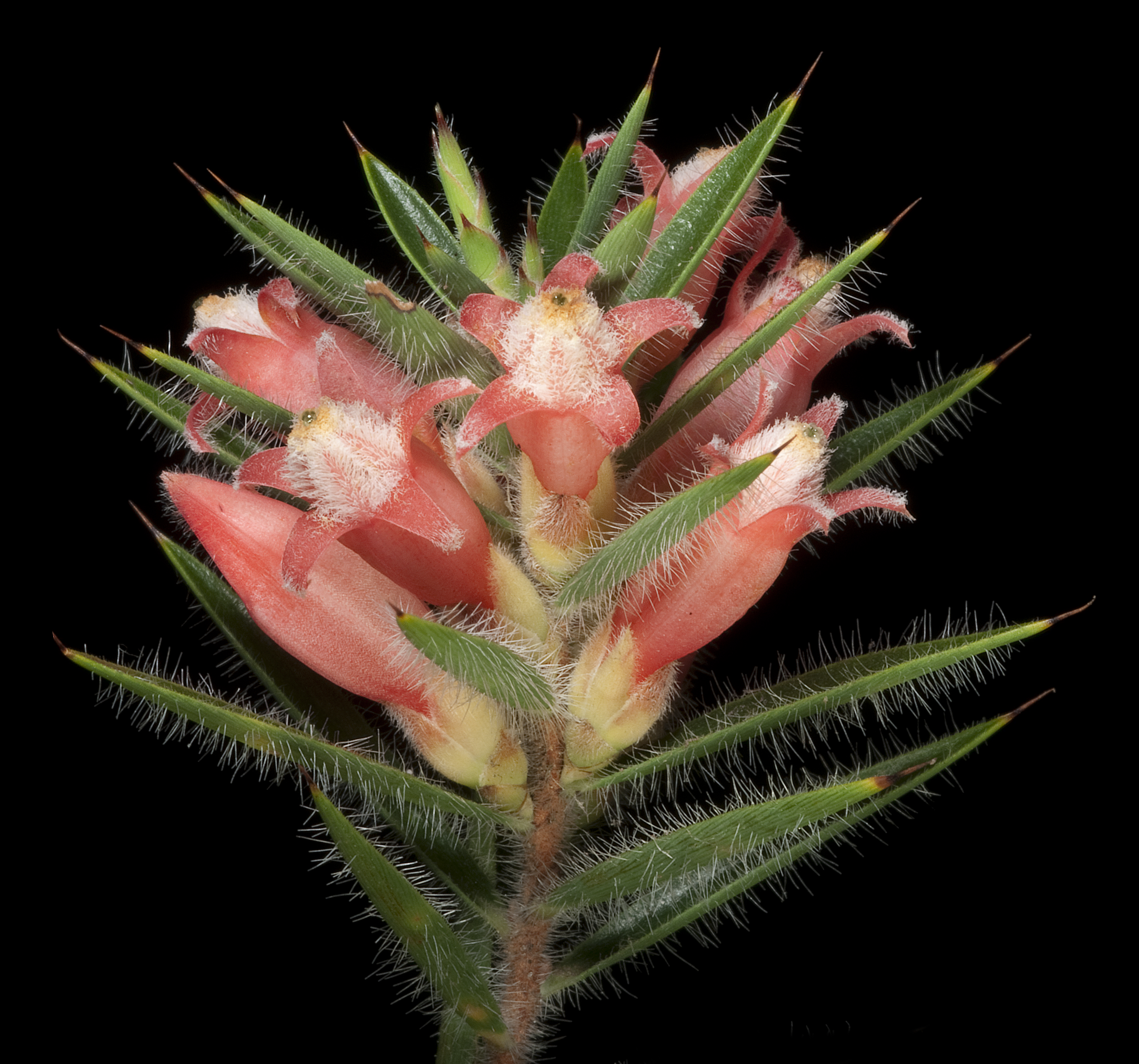
Styphelia stomarrhena

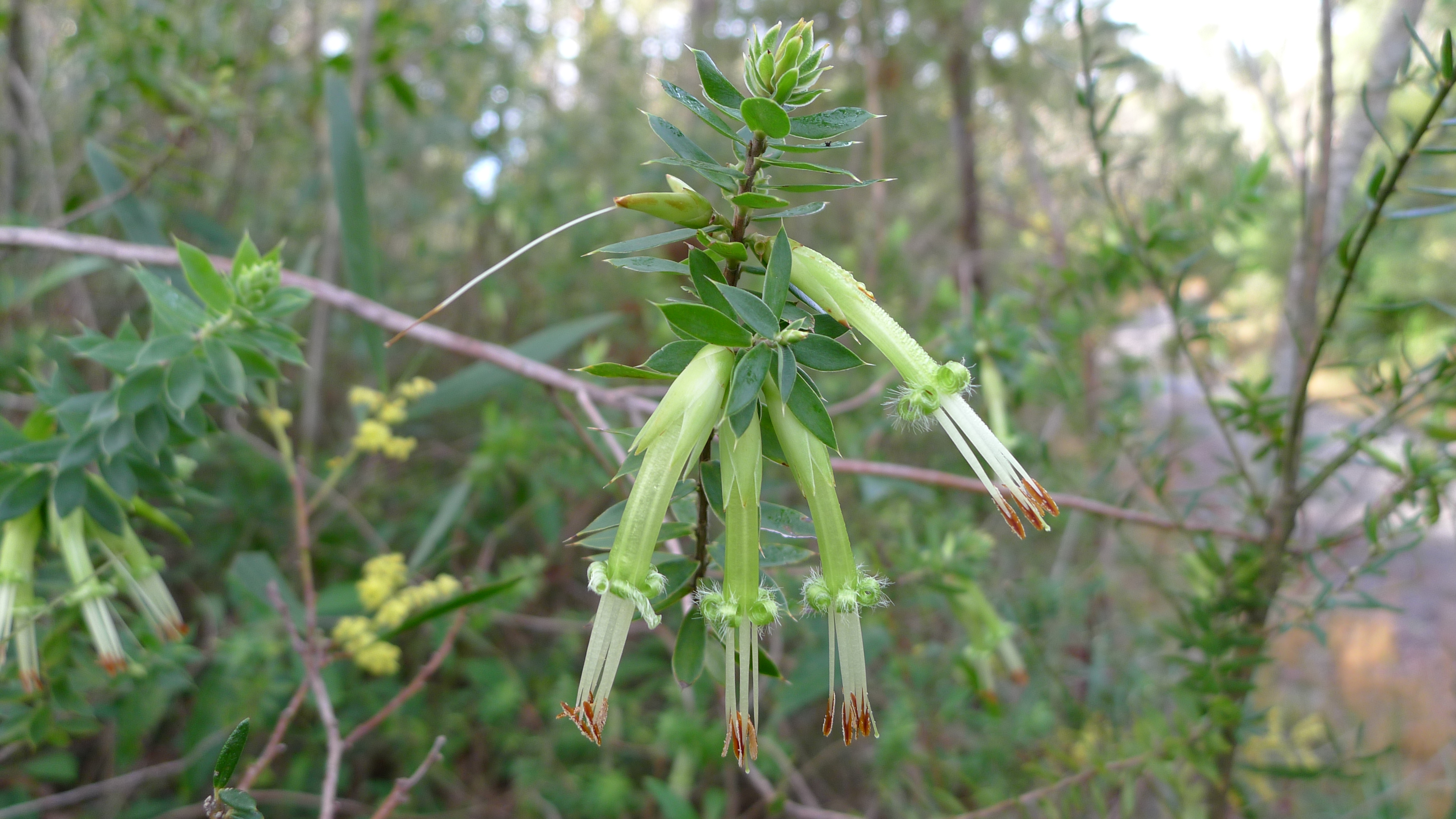
Styphelia viridis

Styphelia is a genus of shrubs in the family Ericaceae, native from Indo-China through the Pacific to Australia. Most have minute or small leaves with a sharp tip, single, tube-shaped flowers arranged in leaf axils and with the ends of the petals rolled back with hairs in the inside of the tube.

== Description ==
Plants in the genus Styphelia are usually erect or spreading shrubs that have egg-shaped, elliptical or oblong, more or less sessile leaves with many fine, almost parallel veins and a sharp point on the tip. The flowers are usually arranged singly in leaf axils with small bracts grading to larger bracteoles at the base and five, usually coloured sepals. The petals are fused to form a cylindrical tube with their tips rolled back. The inside of the petal tube is hairy and the five stamens and thread-like style extend beyond the end of the tube. The fruit is a drupe with a dry or slightly fleshy mesocarp and a hard endocarp.

== Taxonomy and naming ==
The genus Styphelia was first formally described in 1793 by James Edward Smith in his book A Specimen of the Botany of New Holland. The name Styphelia is from an ancient Greek word meaning "tough" or "harsh", referring to the "stiff, prickly leaves and general habit" of the genus.

=== Species list ===
The following is a list of species of Styphelia accepted by Plants of the World Online as at October 2024:

- Styphelia abnormis (Sond.) F.Muell. (Northern Borneo to New Guinea)
- Styphelia abscondita J.J.Sm. (New Guinea)
- Styphelia acervata (Hislop & A.J.G.Wilson) Hislop, Crayn & Puente-Lel. (W.A.)
- Styphelia acuminata (R.Br.) Spreng. (N.T.)
- Styphelia adscendens R.Br. – golden heath (N.S.W., S.A., Vic., Tas.)
- Styphelia allittii (F.Muell.) F.Muell. (W.A.)
- Styphelia angustiflora Hislop & Puente-Lel. (W.A.)
- Styphelia angustifolia DC. (N.S.W.)
- Styphelia annulata Hislop (W.A.)
- Styphelia anomala Hislop (W.A.)
- Styphelia appressa (R.Br.) Spreng. (N.S.W., Qld., Vic.)
- Styphelia attenuata (A.Cunn.) F.Muell. – grey beard-heath (N.S.W., Qld., Vic.)
- Styphelia balansae Virot (New Caledonia)
- Styphelia biflora (R.Br.) Spreng. (N.S.W., Qld., Vic.)
- Styphelia blackallii Hislop (W.A.)
- Styphelia blakei Hislop, Crayn & Puente-Lel. (Qld.)
- Styphelia blepharolepis F.Muell. (W.A.)
- Styphelia brachygyna Hislop (W.A.)
- Styphelia bracteolosa Hislop (W.A.)
- Styphelia brevicuspis (Benth.) F.Muell. (W.A.)
- Styphelia breviflora (F.Muell.) F.Muell. (W.A.)
- Styphelia browniae Hislop (W.A.)
- Styphelia capillaris Hislop & Puente-Lel. – Horts' styphelia (W.A.)
- Styphelia carolineae Hislop (W.A.)
- Styphelia caudata Hislop (W.A.)
- Styphelia cernua Hislop & Puente-Lel. (W.A.)
- Styphelia chlorantha Hislop & A.J.G.Wilson (W.A.)
- Styphelia ciliosa Hislop & Puente-Lel. (W.A.)
- Styphelia clelandii (Cheel) J.H.Willis – Cleland's bearded-heath (S.A., Vic.)
- Styphelia coelophylla (A.Cunn. ex DC.) Hislop, Crayn & Puente-Lel. (W.A.)
- Styphelia cognata A.R.Bean (Qld.)
- Styphelia compacta (R.Br.) Spreng. (W.A.)
- Styphelia conchifolia (Strid) Hislop, Crayn & Puente-Lel. (W.A.)
- Styphelia concinna (Benth.) F.Muell. (W.A.)
- Styphelia conferta (Benth.) F.Muell. – Torrington beard-heath (N.S.W., Qld.)
- Styphelia conostephioides (DC.) F.Muell. (W.A.)
- Styphelia cordifolia (Lindl.) F.Muell. – heart-leaved beard-heath (N.S.W., S.A., Vic., W.A.)
- Styphelia corynocarpa (Sond.) F.Muell. (W.A.)
- Styphelia coryphila (Guillaumin) Sleumer (New Caledonia)
- Styphelia crassiflora F.Muell. (W.A.)
- Styphelia crassifolia (Sond.) F.Muell. (W.A.)
- Styphelia cuspidata (R.Br.) Spreng. (Qld.)
- Styphelia cymbiformis (A.Cunn. ex DC.) F.Muell. (W.A.)
- Styphelia cymbulae (Labill.) Spreng. (Fiji, New Caledonia, Vanuatu)
- Styphelia cylindrica Hislop (W.A.)
- Styphelia dammarifolia (Brongn. & Gris) F.Muell. (New Caledonia)
- Styphelia decussata Hislop, Crayn & Puente-Lel. (W.A.)
- Styphelia deformis (R.B.) Spreng. (N.S.W., Qld.)
- Styphelia densifolia Hislop, Crayn & Puente-Lel. (W.A.)
- Styphelia deserticola Hislop (W.A.)
- Styphelia dielsiana (E.Pritz.) Sleumer (W.A.)
- Styphelia discolor (Sond.) Hislop, Crayn & Puente-Lel. (W.A.)
- Styphelia disjuncta Hislop & Puente-Lel. (W.A.)
- Styphelia echinulata Hislop (W.A.)
- Styphelia enervia (Guillaumin) Sleumer (New Caledonia)
- Styphelia epacridis (DC.) F.Muell. (W.A.)
- Styphelia erectifolia Hislop, Crayn & Puente-Lel. (W.A.)
- Styphelia ericoides Sm. – pink beard-heath (N.S.W., Qld., S.A., Tas., Vic.)
- Styphelia erubescens F.Muell. (W.A.)
- Styphelia esquamata (R.Br.) Spreng. – swamp beard-heath (N.S.W., Qld., Tas., Vic.)
- Styphelia exarata Hislop (W.A.)
- Styphelia exarrhena (F.Muell.) F.Muell. – desert styphelia (S.A., Vic.)
- Styphelia exilis Hislop (W.A.)
- Styphelia exolasia F.Muell. – Woronora beard-heath (N.S.W.)
- Styphelia exserta (F.Muell.) Sleumer (W.A.)
- Styphelia filamentosa Hislop & Puente-Lel. (W.A.)
- Styphelia filifolia Hislop & Puente-Lel. (W.A.)
- Styphelia flavescens (Sond.) F.Muell. (W.A.)
- Styphelia fletcheri (Maiden & Betche) Maiden & Betche (N.S.W., Qld., Vic.)
- Styphelia flexifolia (R.Br.) Spreng. (Qld.)
- Styphelia foliosa (Sond.) Hislop, Crayn & Puente-Lel. (W.A.)
- Styphelia forbesii Sleumer (Lesser Sunda Islands)
- Styphelia geniculata Crayn (Qld.)
- Styphelia glaucifolia (W.Fitzg.) Hislop, Crayn & Puente-Lel. (W.A.)
- Styphelia globosa Hislop (W.A.)
- Styphelia grandiflora (Pedley) Hislop, Crayn & Puente-Lel. (Qld.)
- Styphelia graniticola Hislop (W.A.)
- Styphelia hainesii F.Muell. (W.A.)
- Styphelia hamulosa (E.Pritz.) Sleumer (W.A.)
- Styphelia hispida (E.Pritz.) Sleumer (W.A.)
- Styphelia howatharra Hislop (W.A.)
- Styphelia humifusa (Cav.) Pers. – native cranberry, cranberry heath (N.S.W, S.A., Tas., Vic.)
- Styphelia hyalina Hislop (W.A.)
- Styphelia imbricata (R.Br.) Spreng. (Qld.)
- Styphelia incerta Hislop (W.A.)
- Styphelia inframediana Hislop (W.A.)
- Styphelia inopinata (Hislop) Hislop, Crayn & Puente-Lel. (W.A.)
- Styphelia insularis (A.Cunn. ex DC.) Hislop, Crayn & Puente-Lel. (W.A.)
- Styphelia intertexta A.S.George (W.A.)
- Styphelia intricata Hislop (W.A.)
- Styphelia javanica (Zoll. & Moritzi) J.J.Sm. (Java)
- Styphelia kalbarriensis Hislop & E.A.Br. (W.A.)
- Styphelia kingiana F.Muell. (W.A.)
- Styphelia laeta R.Br. (N.S.W.) – five corners
- Styphelia lanata Hislop, Crayn & Puente-Lel. (W.A.)
- Styphelia lavarackii (Pedley) Hislop, Crayn & Puente-Lel. (Qld.)
- Styphelia leptantha (Benth.) F.Muell. (W.A.)
- Styphelia leptospermoides (R.Br.) Spreng. (N.S.W., Qld.)
- Styphelia lissanthoides (F.Muell.) F.Muell. (S.A., W.A.)
- Styphelia longifolia R.Br. – long-leaf styphelia (N.S.W.)
- Styphelia longissima Hislop, Crayn & Puente-Lel. (W.A.)
- Styphelia longistylis (Brongn. & Gris) Sleumer (New Caledonia)
- Styphelia lucens A.R.Bean (Qld.)
- Styphelia macrocalyx (Sond.) F.Muell. – Swan berry (W.A.)
- Styphelia macrocarpa (Schltr.) Sleumer (New Caledonia)
- Styphelia madida Hislop (W.A.)
- Styphelia malayana (Jack) J.J.Sm. (Borneo, Cambodia, Malaya, Myanmar, New Guinea, Sumatra, Thailand, Vietnam)
- Styphelia margarodes (R.Br.) Spreng. (N.S.W., Qld.)
- Styphelia marginata (W.Fitzg.) Hislop, Crayn & Puente-Lel. – thick-margined leucopogon (W.A.)
- Styphelia melaleucoides F.Muell. (W.A.)
- Styphelia microcalyx (Sond.) F.Muell. native cranberry (W.A.)
- Styphelia microdonta (F.Muell. ex Benth) F.Muell. (W.A.)
- Styphelia mitchellii (Benth.) F.Muell. (Qld.)
- Styphelia multiflora Spreng. (Chatham Island, N.S.W., Vic., W.A.)
- Styphelia mutica (R.Br.) F.Muell. – blunt beard-heath (N.S.W., Qld.)
- Styphelia nana (M.I.Dawson & Heenan) Hislop, Crayn & Puente-Lel. (New Zealand South Island)
- Styphelia neoanglica (F.Muell. ex Benth.) F.Muell. – New England beard heath (N.S.W., Qld.)
- Styphelia nesophila (DC.) Sleumer – sharp beard-heath, pātōtara, dwarf mingimingi (N.S.W., New Zealand, Tasmania, Victoria)
- Styphelia nitens Sleumer (W.A.)
- Styphelia oblongifolia (A.J.G.Wilson & Hislop) Hislop, Crayn & Puente-Lel. (W.A.)
- Styphelia obtecta (Benth.) F.Muell. (W.A.)
- Styphelia pallens Hislop (W.A.)
- Styphelia pallida (R.Br.) Spreng. – kick bush (W.A.)
- Styphelia pancheri (Brongn. & Gris) F.Muell. (New Caledonia)
- Styphelia papillosa Hislop (W.A.)
- Styphelia pendula (R.Br.) Spreng. (W.A.)
- Styphelia pentapogona F.Muell. (W.A.)
- Styphelia perileuca J.M.Powell – montane green five-corners (N.S.W.)
- Styphelia piliflora Crayn (Qld.)
- Styphelia planiconvexa Hislop (W.A.)
- Styphelia planifolia (Sond.) Sleumer (W.A.)
- Styphelia platyneura Hislop (W.A.)
- Styphelia pogonocalyx (F.Muell. ex Benth.) F.Muell. (W.A.)
- Styphelia propinqua (R.Br.) Spreng. (W.A.)
- Styphelia prostrata (R.Br.) F.Muell. (W.A.)
- Styphelia psiloclada J.M.Powell (N.S.W.)
- Styphelia psilopus (Stschegl.) Hislop, Crayn & Puente-Lel. (W.A.)
- Styphelia pubescens (S.Moore) Hislop, Crayn & Puente-Lel. (W.A.)
- Styphelia quartzitica Hislop (W.A.)
- Styphelia racemulosa (DC.) F.Muell. (W.A.)
- Styphelia rectiloba Hislop (W.A.)
- Styphelia recurva Hislop (W.A.)
- Styphelia recurvisepala (C.T.White) Sleumer (N.S.W., Qld.)
- Styphelia retrorsa Hislop, Crayn & Puente-Lel. (W.A.)
- Styphelia rigida (A.Cunn. ex DC.) Hislop, Crayn & Puente-Lel. (W.A.)
- Styphelia riparia (N.A.Wakef.) J.H.Willis (Vic.)
- Styphelia roseola Hislop (W.A.)
- Styphelia rotundifolia (R.Br.) Spreng. (W.A.)
- Styphelia rufa (Lindl.) F.Muell. – spoon-leaf beard-heath, ruddy bearded-heath (N.S.W., S.A., Vic.)
- Styphelia rupicola (C.T.White) Sleumer (Qld.)
- Styphelia ruscifolia (R.Br.) Spreng. (N.T., Qld.)
- Styphelia saxicola Hislop (W.A.)
- Styphelia scabrella Hislop (W.A.)
- Styphelia serratifolia (DC.) Hislop, Crayn & Puente-Lel. (W.A.)
- Styphelia setigera (R.Br.) Spreng. (N.S.W., Vic.)
- Styphelia sieberi (DC.) Hislop, Crayn & Puente-Lel. – prickly beard-heath (N.S.W., Qld., Vic.)
- Styphelia sonderensis (J.H.Willis) Hislop, Crayn & Puente-Lel. – Mount Sonder beard-heath (N.T.)
- Styphelia stomarrhena (Sond.) Sleumer – red swamp cranberry (W.A.)
- Styphelia striata (R.Br.) Spreng. (W.A.)
- Styphelia strongylophylla (F.Muell.) F.Muell. (W.A.)
- Styphelia subglauca Hislop (W.A.)
- Styphelia subulata (F.Muell.) Hislop, Crayn & Puente-Lel. (W.A.)
- Styphelia sulcata Hislop & Puente-Lel. (W.A.)
- Styphelia tamminensis (E.Pritz.) Sleumer (W.A.)
- Styphelia tecta (R.Br.) Spreng. (W.A)
- Styphelia tenuiflora Lindl. – common pinheath (W.A.)
- Styphelia tortifolia Hislop, Crayn & Puente-Lel. (W.A.)
- Styphelia trichostyla (J.M.Powell) Hislop, Crayn & Puente-Lel. – daphne heath (N.S.W., Qld.)
- Styphelia triflora Andrews – pink five-corners (Qld., N.S.W., A.C.T.)
- Styphelia tubiflora Sm. – red five-corners (N.S.W.)
- Styphelia undulata Hislop (W.A.)
- Styphelia veillonii Virot (New Caledonia)
- Styphelia viridis Andrews – green five corners (N.S.W., Qld.)
- Styphelia wetarensis J.J.Sm. (Lesser Sunda Island)
- Styphelia williamsiorum Hislop & Puente-Lel. (W.A.)
- Styphelia woodsii (F.Muell.) F.Muell. – nodding beard-heath (S.A., Vic., W.A.)
- Styphelia xerophylla (DC.) F.Muell. (W.A.)
- Styphelia yorkensis (Pedley) Hislop, Crayn & Puente-Lel. (Qld.)

== Distribution ==
Species of Styphelia occur in all Australian mainland states, the Northern Territory and the Australian Capital Territory. Other species are found northwards to Indo-China.
