= Styphelia cymbiformis =

Conservation status
- Priority Two — Poorly Known Taxa (DEC)

Scientific classification
- Kingdom: Plantae
- Clade: Tracheophytes
- Clade: Angiosperms
- Clade: Eudicots
- Clade: Asterids
- Order: Ericales
- Family: Ericaceae
- Genus: Styphelia
- Species: S. cymbiformis

Binomial name
- Styphelia cymbiformis (A.Cunn. ex DC.) F.Muell.
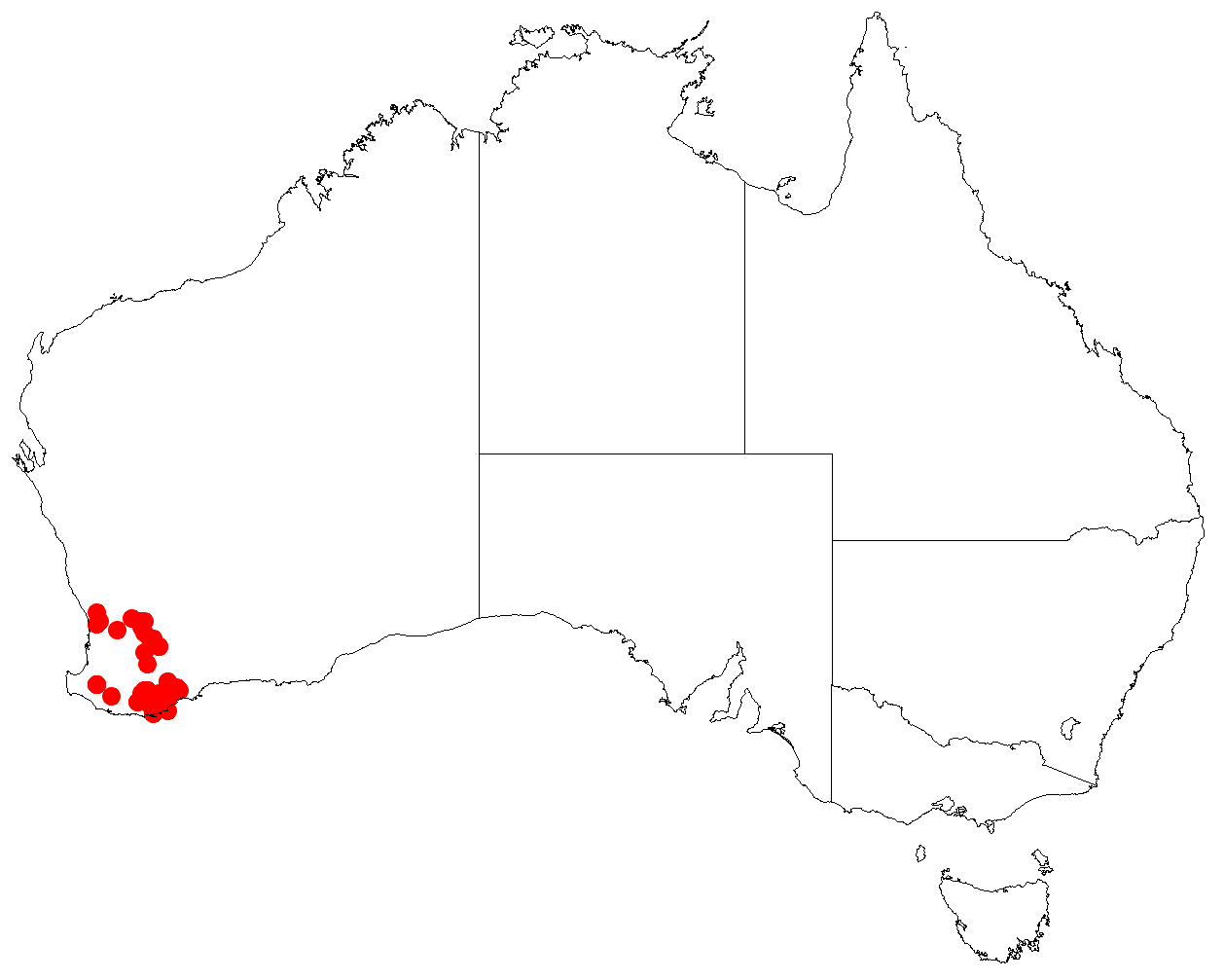
- Occurrence data from AVH

Synonyms
- Leucopogon cymbiformis A.Cunn. ex DC.

Species of shrub

Styphelia cymbiformis is a flowering plant in the family Ericaceae and is endemic to the south-west of Western Australia. It is a bushy or wiry shrub that typically grows to a height of 30–50 cm (12–20 in) and has more or less glabrous branches. Its leaves are erect, linear to lance-shaped and sharply-pointed, mostly 2–4 mm (0.079–0.157 in) long. The flowers are arranged in short spikes, sometimes of only two or three flowers, with lance-shaped, leaf-like bracts, and bracteoles half as long as the sepals at the base of the spikes. The sepals are 2.5–3.0 mm (0.098–0.118 in) long and the petals slightly longer than the sepals, the lobes shorter than the petal tube.

Leucopogon cymbiformis was first formally described in 1839 by Augustin Pyramus de Candolle in his Prodromus Systematis Naturalis Regni Vegetabilis from an unpublished description by Allan Cunningham. In 1867, Ferdinand von Mueller changed the name to Styphelia cymbiformis in his Fragmenta Phytographiae Australiae. The specific epithet (cymbiformis) means "boat-shaped", referring to the leaves.

This styphelia grows in the Avon Wheatbelt, Esperance Plains and Jarrah Forest bioregions of south-western Western Australia.
