= Styphelia densifolia =

Scientific classification
- Kingdom: Plantae
- Clade: Tracheophytes
- Clade: Angiosperms
- Clade: Eudicots
- Clade: Asterids
- Order: Ericales
- Family: Ericaceae
- Genus: Styphelia
- Species: S. densifolia

Binomial name
- Styphelia densifolia Hislop, Crayn & Puente-Lel.

Synonyms
- Leucopogon flavescens var. brevifolius Benth.

Species of plant

Styphelia densifolia is a species of flowering plant in the heath family Ericaceae and is endemic to the south-west of Western Australia. It is a shrub with erect branches, crowded, erect, oblong leaves 4–6.5 mm (0.16–0.26 in) long and striated on the lower surface, and white, tube-shaped flowers arranged singly in upper leaf axils.

It was first formally described in 1868 by George Bentham who gave it the name Leucopogon flavescens var. brevifolius in his Flora Australiensis from specimens collected by James Drummond.

In 2020, Michael Clyde Hislop, Darren M. Crayn and Caroline Puente-Lelievre transferred it to the genus Styphelia and raised it to species status. Since the name Styphelia flavescens was used for a different species, (Styphelia flavescens (Sond.) F.Muell.) the species was given the name Styphelia densifolia.

Styphelia densifolia occurs between Jerramungup and Jerdacuttup in the Esperance Plains bioregion of south-western Western Australia.
