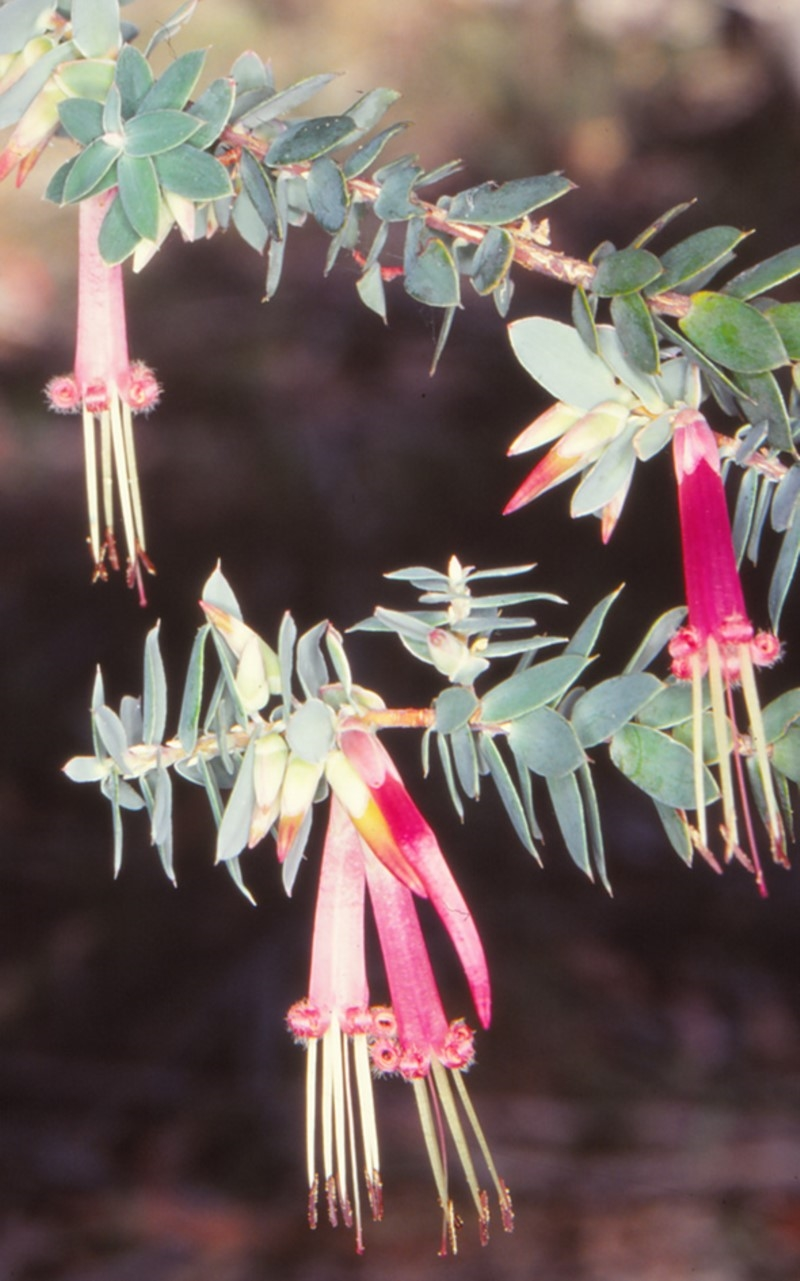
- In Wadbilliga National Park

Scientific classification
- Kingdom: Plantae
- Clade: Tracheophytes
- Clade: Angiosperms
- Clade: Eudicots
- Clade: Asterids
- Order: Ericales
- Family: Ericaceae
- Genus: Styphelia
- Species: S. psiloclada

Binomial name
- Styphelia psiloclada J.M.Powell

= Styphelia psiloclada =

Species of flowering plants

Styphelia psiloclada is a species of flowering plant in the heath family Ericaceae and is endemic to a small area of New South Wales. It is an erect to spreading shrub, usually with oblong leaves and light pink to dark crimson-pink flowers. It is only known from two National Parks on the South Coast.

== Description ==
Styphelia psiloclada is an erect to spreading shrub that typically grows to a height of 0.6–1.5 m (2 ft 0 in – 4 ft 11 in). Its leaves are bluish or greyish green, mostly oblong, 8.3–17.4 mm (0.33–0.69 in) and 3.9–7.5 mm (0.15–0.30 in) wide on a petiole up to 1 mm (0.039 in) long. The flowers are arranged singly, sometimes in pairs in upper leaf axils, with broadly egg-shaped bracts 1.0–1.9 mm (0.039–0.075 in) long and 1.5–2.1 mm (0.059–0.083 in) wide and bracteoles 2.6–3.2 mm (0.10–0.13 in) long and 2.3–3.4 mm (0.091–0.134 in) long at the base. The petals are light pink to dark crimson-pink, joined at the base to form a cylindrical tube 13.4–18.1 mm (0.53–0.71 in) long with lobes that are rolled backwards and hairy, 16.1–17.9 mm (0.63–0.70 in) long. The stamens are straight and extend beyond the end of the petal tube. Flowering occurs between January and March.

== Taxonomy and naming ==
Styphelia psiloclada was first formally described in 1992 by Jocelyn Powell in the journal Telopea from specimens collected in Wadbilliga National Park. The specific epithet (psiloclada) means "bare" or "smooth" branches, referring to the glabrous stems and branches.

== Distribution and habitat ==
This species of Styphelia is only known from Wadbilliga and South East Forests National Parks, where it grows in forest on rocky ridges at altitudes between 900 and 1,130 m (2,950 and 3,710 ft).
