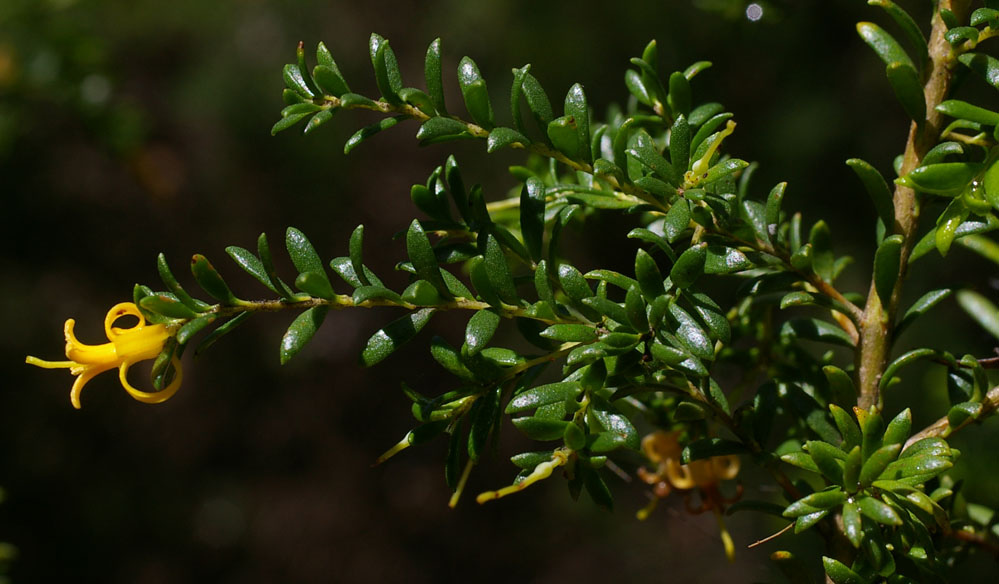
- P. t. terminalis at the Australian National Botanic Gardens

Scientific classification
- Kingdom: Plantae
- Clade: Tracheophytes
- Clade: Angiosperms
- Clade: Eudicots
- Order: Proteales
- Family: Proteaceae
- Genus: Persoonia
- Species: P. terminalis

Binomial name
- Persoonia terminalis L.A.S.Johnson & P.H.Weston

Subspecies
- P. t. subsp. recurva; P. t. subsp. terminalis

Synonyms
- Persoonia nutans subsp. D P.H.Weston

= Persoonia terminalis =

Species of shrub native to Australia

Persoonia terminalis, also known as the Torrington geebung, is a shrub belonging to the family Proteaceae, and native to northern New South Wales and southern Queensland in eastern Australia. Reported as a subspecies of Persoonia nutans in 1981, it was described as a species by Lawrie Johnson and his colleague Peter Weston in 1991.

Two subspecies‍—‌P. t. terminalis and P. t. recurva‍—‌are recognised; both are found on well-drained acidic soils in sclerophyll forests, and P. t. terminalis is also found on granite outcrops. Although similar in appearance, they differ in leaf length and curvature. Both have a restricted range, with P. t. terminalis found in an area of under 100 square kilometres (39 square miles; 25,000 acres).

P. terminalis grows to 1.5 metres (5 feet), with an upright or spreading habit, and narrow short leaves up to 1 centimetre (0.4 inches) in length. The yellow flowers mainly appear in December and January (Australia's temperate zone summer), and are followed by purple-striped green drupes (stone fruit). The fruit of persoonias are edible, and dispersed by wild vertebrates.

== Taxonomy ==
Persoonia terminalis was first reported by Lawrie Johnson of the Royal Botanic Gardens, Sydney, in the 1981 edition of Flora of New South Wales. He viewed it as a distinctive subspecies of Persoonia nutans, (Note: Persoonia nutans subsp. D) a broadly defined species that included many forms since classified as distinct. Queensland botanists Trevor Donald Stanley and Estelle M. Ross classed P. terminalis as part of Persoonia oxycoccoides in their 1983 work Flora of South-eastern Queensland. They considered it more likely a species in its own right, as they believed the description of the Queensland populations did not match the P. oxycoccoides from central New South Wales. Upon re-examining Persoonia nutans and Persoonia oxycoccoides, Johnson and Peter Weston concluded that there were in fact several distinct species, and that Persoonia terminalis was described as such in 1991. The type specimen was collected 3.4 kilometres (2.1 mi) south of the Torrington pub on the Emmaville–Torrington road by Weston and ecologist Peter Richards, and is now housed in the National Herbarium of New South Wales, which is part of the Royal Botanic Gardens and Domain Trust Sydney and Office of Environment and Heritage. The Herbarium houses over 1.2 million other specimens. The generic name Persoonia is derived from the name of South African botanist Christiaan Hendrik Persoon. The specific name terminalis refers to the inflorescences (clusters of flowers) that are in this species at the ends of the branchlets. Its common name is the Torrington geebung.

It is classified within the genus as within the Lanceolata group, which consists of 58 closely related species with similar flowers but very different foliage. These species will often interbreed with each other in areas where two members of the group occur. P. terminalis has been reported to interbreed with Persoonia cornifolia and Persoonia sericea, two other members of the group.

Two subspecies are recognised: P. t. subsp. recurva has shorter leaves, with margins more curved downwards, that reach a maximum of 0.75 centimetres (0.30 in) in length, while P. t. subsp. terminalis has longer, straighter leaves measuring a maximum of 1 centimetre (0.4 in) long.

== Description ==
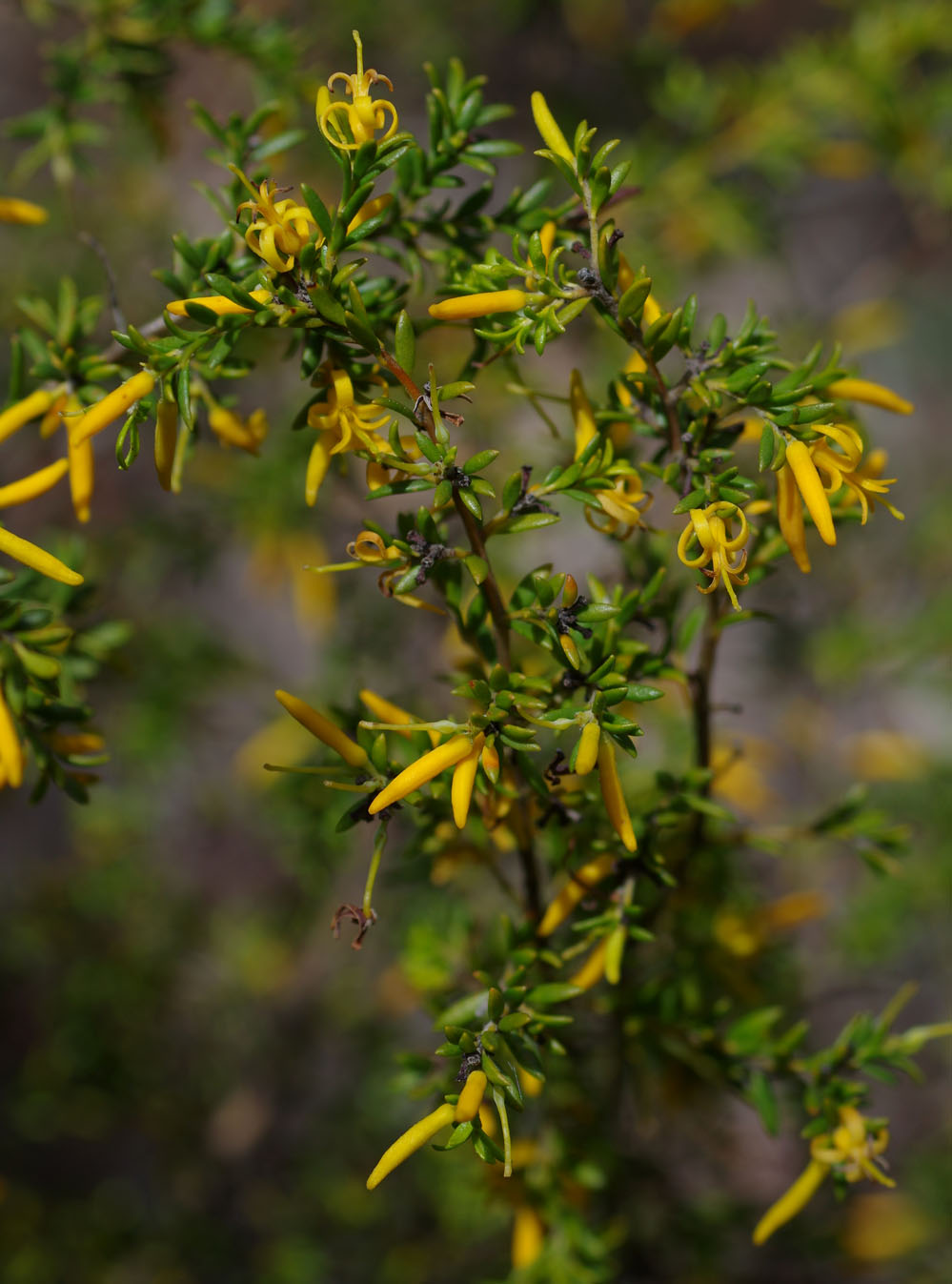
Persoonia terminalis subsp. recurva

Persoonia terminalis grows as a shrub reaching a height of 0.7–1.5 metres (2 1/4–5 ft), with an upright or spreading habit. It has smooth bark, although new growth is covered in fine hair. The small, narrow leaves are 1.2–2 millimetres (1/16–3/32 inch) wide and 3.5–10 millimetres (1/8–3/8 in) long, with a convex upper surface and margins curved downwards. New leaves can be hairless or slightly hairy; if the latter, they lose the hair with age. They are concolorous‍—‌that is, both leaf surfaces are the same colour, or slightly discolorous (surfaces slightly different). The leaves are rougher than those of other persoonias.

The yellow flowers mainly appear in December and January (summer in the temperate zone of Australia), although occasional flowers have been seen as late as July. They are terminal, that is, arising at the ends of branchlets, where they appear in groups of one to five. P. terminalis is described as mostly anauxotelic, which means each stalk bears an individual flower that is subtended by a scale leaf at its junction with the stem. A proportion of flowers have a true leaf at this junction instead, and are described as auxotelic. Each individual flower consists of a cylindrical perianth that splits into four segments or tepals, and contains both male and female parts. Within this, the central style is surrounded by the anther, which splits into four segments; these curl back and resemble a cross when viewed from above. They provide a landing area for insects attending to the stigma, which is located at the tip of the style. Flowers are followed by the development of the fleshy purple-striped green drupes. These are 1–1.2 centimetres (3/8–1/2 in) long by 0.7–0.8 centimetres (1/4–3/8 in) wide, with the remnant style at the end.

== Distribution and habitat ==

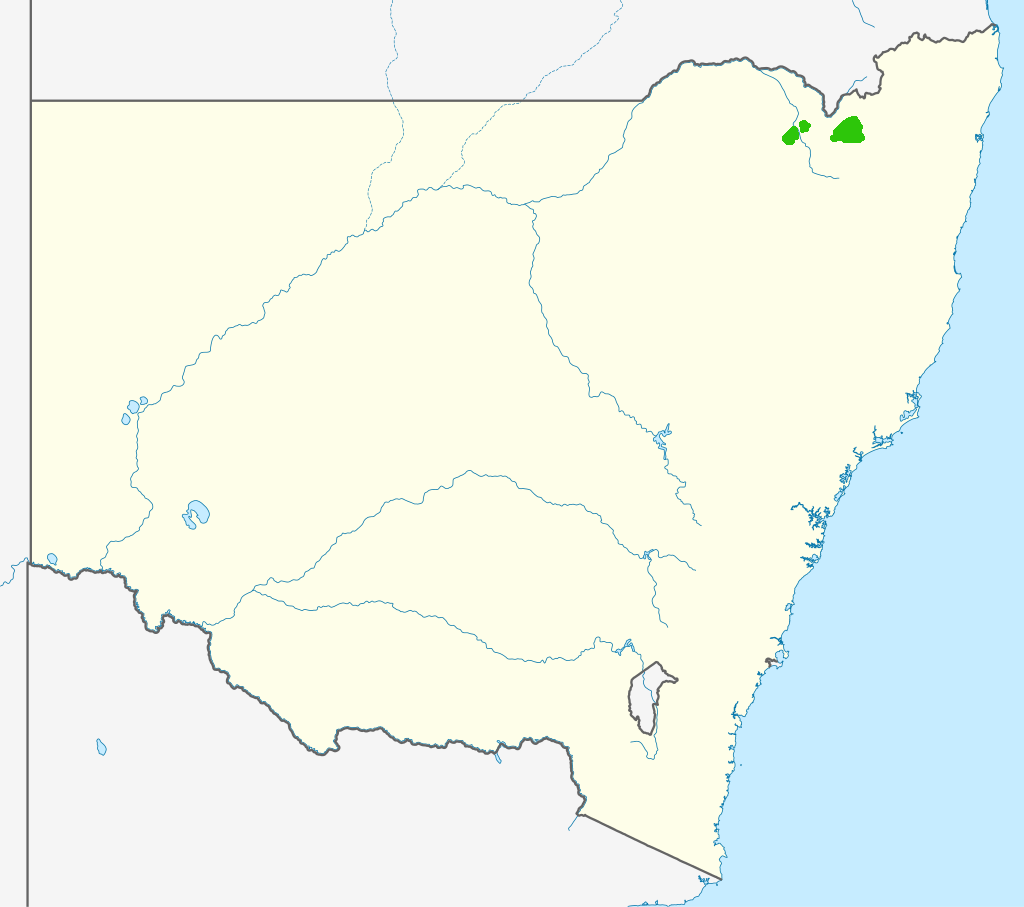
The plant grows in the temperate zone of the Australian state of New South Wales (red, above) and in the more specific region of New England (range marked in green) along its Northern Tablelands.

Persoonia t. subsp. terminalis is found in the Torrington-Binghi area on the western parts of the far Northern Tablelands in New South Wales, roughly halfway between Glen Innes and the Queensland border, at an altitude of between 900 and 1,100 metres (3,000 and 3,600 ft) above sea level. It grows on acidic, sandy or stony granite soils in dry sclerophyll forest. The region is dotted with granite outcrops, where the subspecies is a component of Babingtonia odontocalyx–Brachyloma saxicola shrubland and Prostanthera staurophylla–Kunzea bracteolata low shrubland in the Torrington area, and Allocasuarina brachystachya shrubland in the Severn River Reserve. It is rated 2R (Note: The '2' indicates it has a range of under 100 square kilometres (39 mi^{2}).) on the ROTAP list.

Persoonia t. subsp. recurva has two disjunct populations. One is found on the North Western Slopes in New South Wales, near Warialda north west of Inverell, and the other is southwest of Inglewood in southeastern Queensland, between 350 and 450 metres (1,150 and 1,480 ft) above sea level. It grows on acidic sandstone-based sandy soils in dry sclerophyll forest. Within the Warialda State Conservation Area, it is found in black cypress pine (Callitris endlicheri)‍—‌dirty gum (Eucalyptus chloroclada) woodland and smooth-barked apple (Angophora leiocarpa)‍—‌black cypress pine woodland. Although P. t. recurva has not been recorded from Kings Plains National Park, it could be expected to be found there due to the availability of suitable habitat. It is rated as 3R (Note: The 'R' signifies the taxon as rare but with no current identifiable threat, and the '3' indicates it has a range of over 100 km, though in small populations.) on the ROTAP list.

Both subspecies are commonly found near the Severn River Nature Preserve, as well as in the Arakoola Nature Reserve, where they are components of a woodland ecological community dominated by smooth-barked apple and long-fruited bloodwood (Corymbia dolichocarpa), which grows on sandstone soils.

== Ecology ==
Persoonia terminalis grows in a bushfire-prone habitat, where fire is essential for many species to regenerate. P. t. terminalis is killed by bushfire and regenerates from seed, which lies dormant in the soil. Large numbers of Persoonia seedlings appear after fire. However, rocky outcrop habitat is vulnerable to fires occurring at too-frequent intervals of less than five years, which puts many species that regenerate by seed at risk of local extinction as plants are unable to mature to set seed before the next fire.

Colletid bees of subgenus Cladocerapis within the genus Leioproctus exclusively forage on and pollinate flowers of many species of Persoonia. Bees of subgenus Filiglossa in the same genus also specialise in feeding on Persoonia flowers, but do not appear to be effective pollinators. The fruit are adapted to be eaten by vertebrates, such as kangaroos and possums, as well as currawongs and other large birds.

== Cultivation potential ==
Horticulturists and scientists Rodger Elliot and David L. Jones have proposed that cultivating the plant would aid in its conservation. Cultivating the plant would most likely require good water drainage, a sunny or part-shaded position and acidic soil. P. terminalis is hardy to heavy frosts, and is expected to fare better in a temperate rather than subtropical garden climate. Propagation would theoretically be by seed or by taking cuttings of new growth, though plants of the genus Persoonia are generally difficult to propagate by any means in cultivation.
