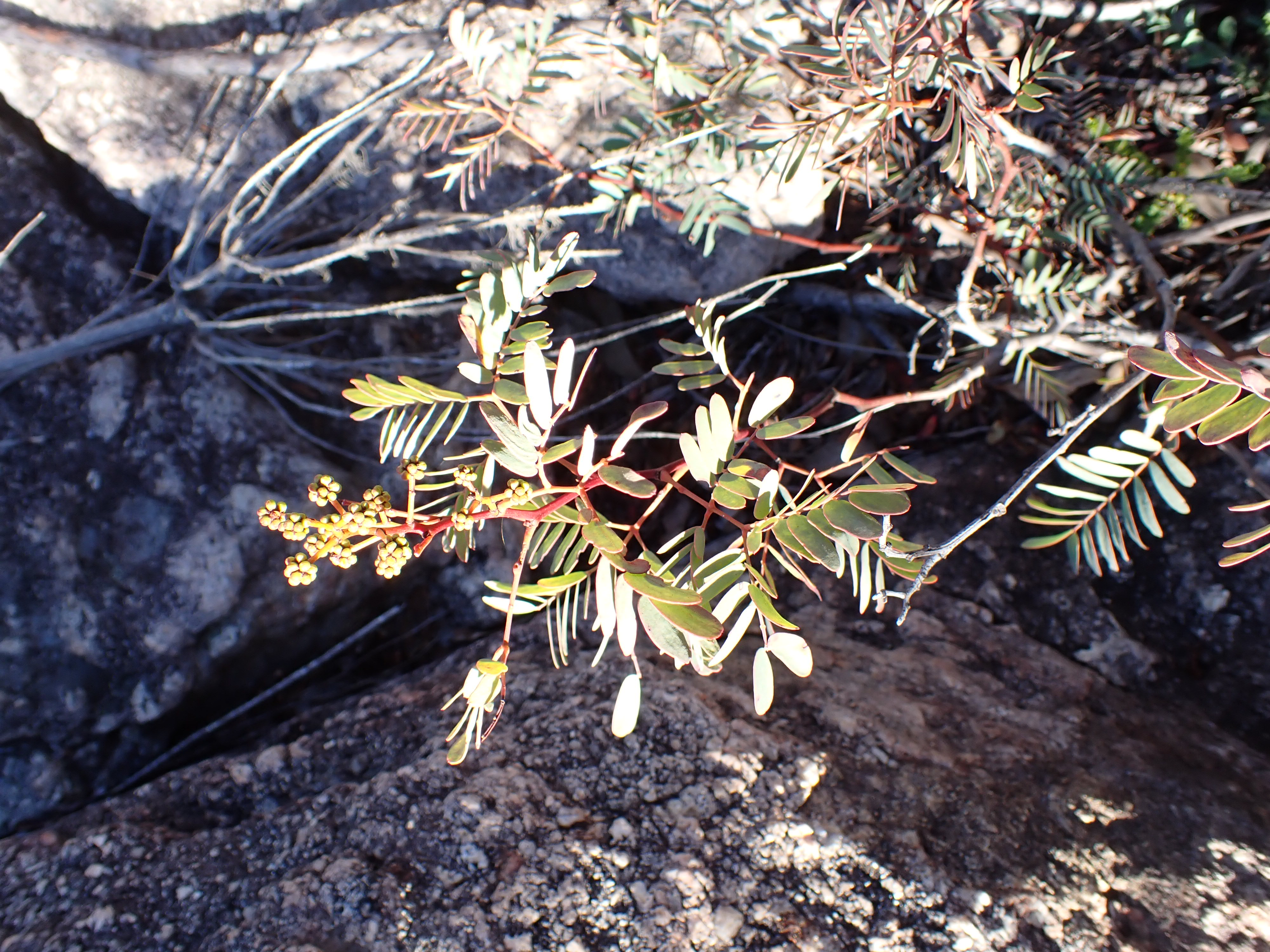
- Near Torrington

Conservation status
- Least Concern (NCA)

Scientific classification
- Kingdom: Plantae
- Clade: Embryophytes
- Clade: Tracheophytes
- Clade: Spermatophytes
- Clade: Angiosperms
- Clade: Eudicots
- Clade: Rosids
- Order: Fabales
- Family: Fabaceae
- Subfamily: Caesalpinioideae
- Clade: Mimosoid clade
- Genus: Acacia
- Species: A. latisepala

Binomial name
- Acacia latisepala Pedley
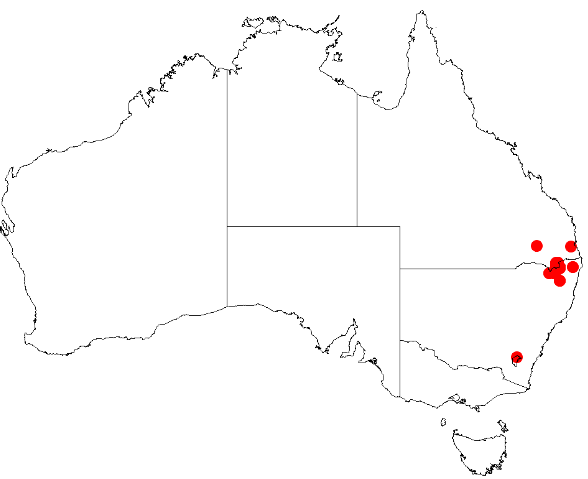
- Occurrence data from AVH

Synonyms
- Racosperma latisepalum (Pedley) Pedley

= Acacia latisepala =

Species of legume

Acacia latisepala is a species of flowering plant in the family Fabaceae and is endemic to eastern Australia. It is a spreading shrub with smooth, grey bark, leathery bipinnate leaves with one to three pairs of pinnae, each with four to eight mostly oblong pinnules, sometimes phyllodes, spherical heads of bright to dark yellow flowers and straight to curved, more or less flat, leathery to slightly woody pods.

== Description ==
Acacia latisepala is a spreading shrub that typically grows to a height of 1–3 m (3 ft 3 in – 9 ft 10 in) and has smooth grey bark and terete branchlets. Its leaves are mostly bipinnate, leathery and often reddish on a flattened petiole 10–40 mm (0.39–1.57 in) long above the pulvinus, the rachis 10–40 mm (0.39–1.57 in) long. There are one to three pairs of pinnae, each with four to eight pairs of mostly more or less oblong to narrowly oblong pinnules 10–21 mm (0.39–0.83 in) long and 4–8 mm (0.16–0.31 in) wide, with a midvein closer to the upper margin and 2 parallel minor veins. There is a prominent, oblong gland below the lowest pair of pinnae. There are sometimes leathery, reddish phyllodes 60–110 mm (2.4–4.3 in) long and 4–7 mm (0.16–0.28 in) wide with a large gland 10–20 mm (0.39–0.79 in) above the pulvinus.

The flowers are borne in spherical heads in racemes or on the ends of branches, the heads 6–10 mm (0.24–0.39 in) in diameter with 11 to 20 bright to dark yellow flowers. Flowering mainly occurs from July to September, and the pods are straight to curved, more or less flats, 40–85 mm (1.6–3.3 in) long, 6–10.5 mm (0.24–0.41 in) wide and leathery to slightly woody, glabrous, dark brown to black or red.

== Taxonomy ==
Acacia latisepala was first formally described in 1964 by Leslie Pedley in the Proceedings of the Royal Society of Queensland from specimens he found about 1 mi (1.6 km) west of Jolly's Falls, 5 mi (8.0 km) north of Stanthorpe in 1963. The specific epithet (latisepala) means 'broad sepals'.

== Distribution and habitat ==
This species of wattle grows in heath or dry sclerophyll forest, often amongst granite boulders, on mountain slopes in shallow sandy soil. It is found in the Darling Downs district of Queensland and on the Northern Tablelands in New South Wales.

== Conservation ==
Acacia latisepala is listed as 'least concern' under the Queensland Government Nature Conservation Act 1992.

== See also ==
- List of Acacia species
