= Brachyloma mogin =

Conservation status
- Priority Three — Poorly Known Taxa (DEC)

Scientific classification
- Kingdom: Plantae
- Clade: Tracheophytes
- Clade: Angiosperms
- Clade: Eudicots
- Clade: Asterids
- Order: Ericales
- Family: Ericaceae
- Genus: Brachyloma
- Species: B. mogin

Binomial name
- Brachyloma mogin Cranfield

Species of plant

Brachyloma mogin is a species of flowering plant in the family Ericaceae and is endemic to the south-west of Western Australia. It is a compact shrub with linear leaves and red to pink, urn-shaped flowers.

== Description ==
Brachyloma mogin is a compact shrub that typically grows to 80 cm (31 in) high and has bristly hairs on its branches. Its leaves are linear, 4.0–10 mm (0.16–0.39 in) long and 1.25–2.0 mm (0.049–0.079 in) wide on petiole 0.5–1.0 mm (0.020–0.039 in) wide. The upper surface of the leaves is glabrous, the lower surface is covered with bristly hairs, many prominent veins, and there is a small, fine point on the tip. The flowers are arranged singly in leaf axils on a pedicel 1.0–1.5 mm (0.039–0.059 in) long with bracts about 1.5 mm (0.059 in) long at the base. The sepals are egg-shaped, 2.0–2.25 mm (0.079–0.089 in) long, and the petals are red to pink and joined to form an urn-shaped tube 4–5 mm (0.16–0.20 in) long with lobes 1.5–3.0 mm (0.059–0.118 in) long. Flowering occurs in May and June.

== Taxonomy and naming ==
Brachyloma mogin was first formally described 2005 by Raymond Jeffrey Cranfield in the journal Nuytsia from specimens collected he collected 28.5 km (17.7 mi) west of Katanning in 1997. The specific epithet (mogin) is a Nyoongar word meaning "similar to", referring to this species' similarity to Brachyloma delbi.

== Distribution ==
This species grows in winter-wet areas in open woodland in the Jarrah Forest and Avon Wheatbelt bioregions of south-western Western Australia.

== Conservation status ==
Brachyloma mogin is listed as "Priority Three" by the Government of Western Australia Department of Biodiversity, Conservation and Attractions, meaning that it is poorly known and known from only a few locations but is not under imminent threat.
