= Brachyloma nguba =

Conservation status
- Priority One — Poorly Known Taxa (DEC)

Scientific classification
- Kingdom: Plantae
- Clade: Tracheophytes
- Clade: Angiosperms
- Clade: Eudicots
- Clade: Asterids
- Order: Ericales
- Family: Ericaceae
- Genus: Brachyloma
- Species: B. nguba

Binomial name
- Brachyloma nguba Cranfield

Species of plant

Brachyloma nguba is a species of flowering plant in the family Ericaceae and is endemic to the south-west of Western Australia. It is a shrub with narrowly elliptic leaves on the ends of short side-branches, and red urn-shaped flowers.

== Description ==
Brachyloma nguba is a shrub that typically grows to 40 cm (16 in) high and has bristly hairs on its branches. Its leaves are narrowly elliptic, 2.0–3.0 mm (0.079–0.118 in) long and 0.9–1.0 mm (0.035–0.039 in) wide on petiole 0.4–0.6 mm (0.016–0.024 in) wide. The upper surface of the leaves is rough, the lower surface is covered with bristly hairs, many prominent veins, and there is a small, fine point on the tip. The flowers are arranged singly in leaf axils on a pedicel 0.2–0.3 mm (0.0079–0.0118 in) long with 2 bracts 1.5–2 mm (0.059–0.079 in) long and 3 sessile bracteoles 0.5–1.0 mm (0.020–0.039 in) long at the base. The sepals are egg-shaped, overlapping each other, 0.5–1 mm (0.020–0.039 in) long and wide, and the petals are red, and joined to form an urn-shaped tube 3.0–4.5 mm (0.12–0.18 in) long with broadly triangular lobes 1.5–2.0 mm (0.059–0.079 in) long. Flowering occurs in April and May.

== Taxonomy and naming ==
Brachyloma nguba was first formally described 1998 by Raymond Jeffrey Cranfield in the journal Nuytsia from specimens collected he collected 50 km (31 mi) east-north-east of Hyden in 1997. The specific epithet (nguba) is a Nyoongar word meaning "blood", referring to the colour of the flowers.

== Distribution ==
This species grows in open mallee woodland in the Mallee bioregion of south-western Western Australia.

== Conservation status ==
Brachyloma nguba is listed as "Priority One" by the Government of Western Australia Department of Biodiversity, Conservation and Attractions, meaning that it is known from only one or a few locations which are potentially at risk.
