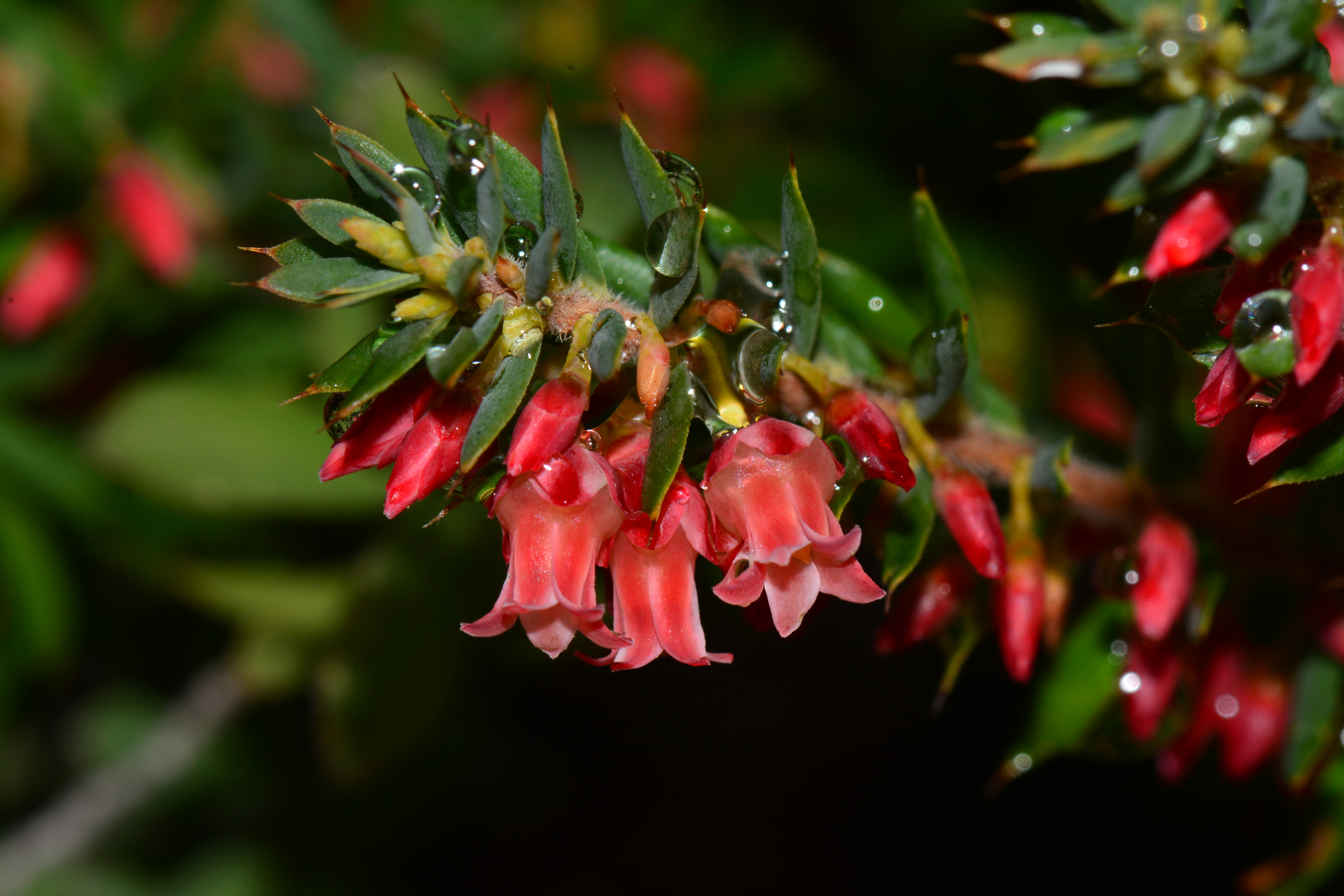

Scientific classification
- Kingdom: Plantae
- Clade: Tracheophytes
- Clade: Angiosperms
- Clade: Eudicots
- Clade: Asterids
- Order: Ericales
- Family: Ericaceae
- Genus: Brachyloma
- Species: B. preissii

Binomial name
- Brachyloma preissii Sond.

Synonyms
- Brachyloma preissii var. brevifolium Sond. Styphelia brachyloma F.Muell.

= Brachyloma preissii =

Species of plant

Brachyloma preissii (common name globe heath) is a species of flowering plant in the heath family, Ericaceae, and is endemic to Western Australia. It is an erect, dense shrub with linear to oblong leaves and red, or pinkish-red, tube-shaped flowers.

== Description ==
Brachyloma preissii is an erect, dense shrub that typically grows to a height of 0.2–1 m (7.9 in – 3 ft 3.4 in), the branchlets slightly hairy. The leaves are linear to oblong, usually 8–17 mm (0.31–0.67 in) long, and paler on the lower surface. The flowers are red or pinkish-red on a peduncle 3–6.5 mm (0.12–0.26 in) long with several bracts and bracteoles at least half as long as the sepals. The sepals are at least 4.3 mm (0.17 in) long with a small point on the tip. The petals are joined at the base to form a tube that is shorter than the sepals, with lobes as long as the tube, with long hairs inside. The filaments are short and the style is 1.0–1.5 mm (0.039–0.059 in) long. Flowering occurs from February to September.

== Taxonomy ==
Brachyloma preissii was first formally described by Otto Wilhelm Sonder in Lehmann's Plantae Preissianae in 1845, from specimens collected near the Swan River by James Drummond. The specific epithet, preissii, honours the botanist Ludwig Preiss.

== Distribution and habitat ==
This shrub grows in coastal areas and on sandplains in the Avon Wheatbelt, Geraldton Sandplains, Jarrah Forest, Mallee, Swan Coastal Plain, and Warren bioregions of south-western Western Australia.
