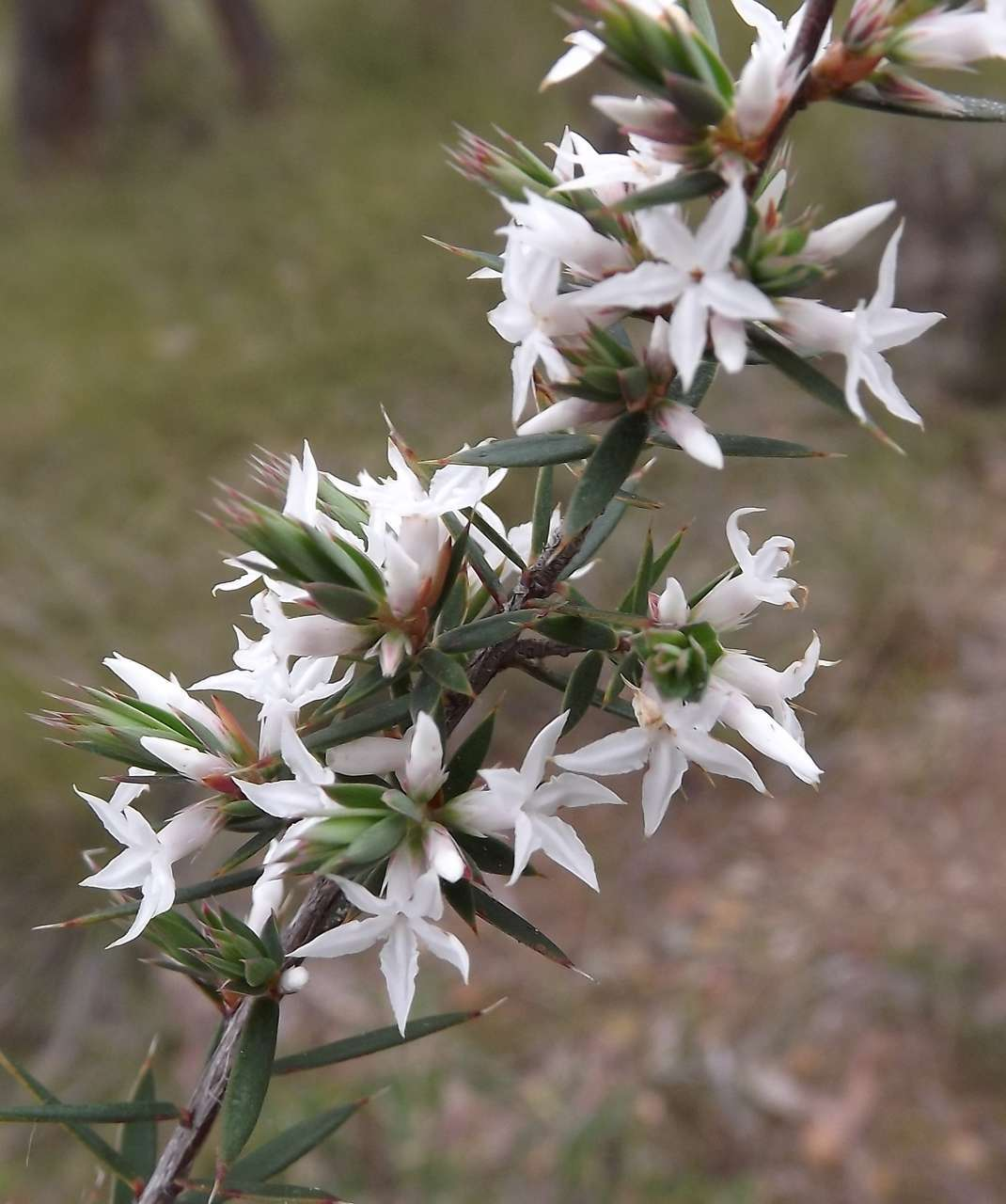
- In Grampians National Park

Scientific classification
- Kingdom: Plantae
- Clade: Tracheophytes
- Clade: Angiosperms
- Clade: Eudicots
- Clade: Asterids
- Order: Ericales
- Family: Ericaceae
- Genus: Brachyloma
- Species: B. depressum

Binomial name
- Brachyloma depressum (F.Muell.) Benth.

Synonyms
- Lissanthe depressa F.Muell.; Styphelia depressa (F.Muell.) F.Muell.

= Brachyloma depressum =

Species of plant

Brachyloma depressum, commonly known as spreading brachyloma or spreading heath, is a species of flowering plant in the family Ericaceae and is endemic to south-eastern Australia. It is a stiff, prickly shrub with sharply-pointed, lance-shaped leaves and white, tube-shaped flowers.

== Description ==
Brachyloma depressum is a stiff, prickly shrub that typically grows to a height of up to about 1 m (3 ft 3 in) and has many branches covered with downy hairs. The leaves are lance-shaped, 5–15 mm (0.20–0.59 in) long and 1–3 mm (0.039–0.118 in) wide with a sharp point on the tip. The flowers are arranged singly in leaf axils on a short peduncle with lance-shaped bracteoles 2.0–3.5 mm (0.079–0.138 in) long at the base. The sepals are lance-shaped, 2.8–3.5 mm (0.11–0.14 in) long and the petals white, joined to form a cylindrical tube 2.6–3.3 mm (0.10–0.13 in) long with spreading, wavy lobes 2.5–4.0 mm (0.098–0.157 in) long and bearded near the base. Flowering occurs from August to December and the fruit is a drupe.

== Taxonomy and naming ==
This species was first formally described 1858 by Ferdinand von Mueller, who gave it the name Lissanthe depressa in his Fragmenta Phytographiae Australiae. In 1868, George Bentham changed the name to Brachyloma depressum in Flora Australiensis. The specific epithet (depressum) means "pressed down".

== Distribution ==
Brachyloma depressum grows in shrubby woodland on sandy or rocky slopes and between granite boulders in scattered locations in Grampians National Park in Victoria, and on the east coast of Tasmania, especially on the Freycinet Peninsula.
