= Brachyloma stenolobum =

Conservation status
- Priority One — Poorly Known Taxa (DEC)

Scientific classification
- Kingdom: Plantae
- Clade: Tracheophytes
- Clade: Angiosperms
- Clade: Eudicots
- Clade: Asterids
- Order: Ericales
- Family: Ericaceae
- Genus: Brachyloma
- Species: B. stenolobum

Binomial name
- Brachyloma stenolobum Cranfield & Hislop

Species of plant

Brachyloma stenolobum is a species of flowering plant in the family Ericaceae and is endemic to a restricted area in the west of Western Australia. It is an erect, compact shrub with narrowly elliptic or elliptic leaves, and white, tube-shaped flowers.

== Description ==
Brachyloma stenolobum is an erect, compact shrub that usually grows to about 1.5 m (4 ft 11 in) high, 1.2 m (3 ft 11 in) wide and has a single stem at ground level. The leaves are narrowly elliptic to elliptic, 3.0–4.8 mm (0.12–0.19 in) long and 1.3–2.0 mm (0.051–0.079 in) wide on a petiole 0.6–1.0 mm (0.024–0.039 in) long. The leaves are more or less glabrous and both sides are a similar shade of green. The flowers are arranged singly or in pairs in leaf axils on a peduncle 0.6–1.2 mm (0.024–0.047 in) long. There are egg-shaped bracts 0.5–0.7 mm (0.020–0.028 in) long and bracteoles 0.8–1.0 mm (0.031–0.039 in) long and 1.0–1.2 mm (0.039–0.047 in) wide at the base of the flowers. The sepals are egg-shaped or broadly egg-shaped, 1.3–1.5 mm (0.051–0.059 in) long, 1.2–1.4 mm (0.047–0.055 in) wide, and pale green or straw-coloured. The petals are white, and joined to form a tube 1.2–1.6 mm (0.047–0.063 in) long with narrowly triangular lobes 2.1–2.7 mm (0.083–0.106 in) long. Flowering has only been observed in May.

== Taxonomy and naming ==
Brachyloma stenolobum was first formally described 2014 by Michael Clyde Hislop and Raymond Jeffrey Cranfield in the journal Nuytsia from specimens collected by Hislop near Forrestaina in 2013. The specific epithet (stenolobum) means "narrow lobe" and refers to the relatively narrow petal lobes.

== Distribution ==
This species of shrub grows in yellow sandplains in heath in the Forrestania area in the Coolgardie bioregion of south-western Western Australia.

== Conservation status ==
Brachyloma stenolobum is listed as "Priority One" by the Government of Western Australia Department of Biodiversity, Conservation and Attractions, meaning that it is known from only one or a few locations which are potentially at risk.
