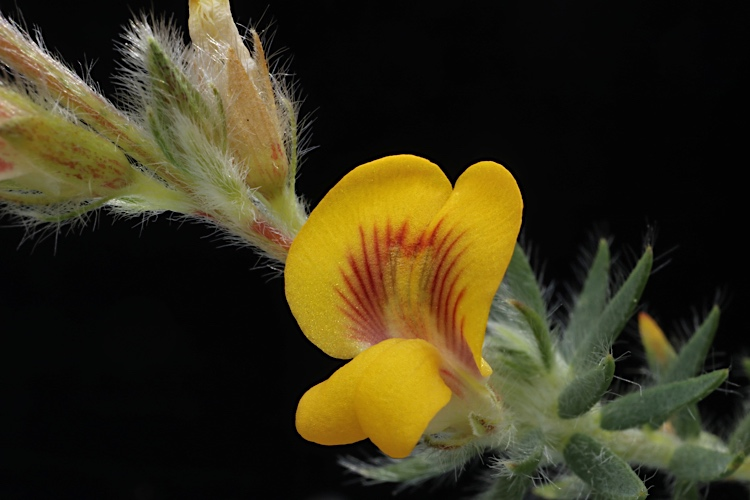

Scientific classification
- Kingdom: Plantae
- Clade: Embryophytes
- Clade: Tracheophytes
- Clade: Spermatophytes
- Clade: Angiosperms
- Clade: Eudicots
- Clade: Rosids
- Order: Fabales
- Family: Fabaceae
- Subfamily: Faboideae
- Genus: Almaleea
- Species: A. incurvata

Binomial name
- Almaleea incurvata (A.Cunn.) Crisp & P.H.Weston

= Almaleea incurvata =

Species of plant

Almaleea incurvata is a flowering plant in the family Fabaceae. It is a small upright shrub with clusters of yellow flowers and is endemic to the Blue Mountains New South Wales.

== Description ==
Almaleea incurvata is a trailing or upright small shrub to 1 m (3 ft 3 in) high. Stems are moderately to thickly covered in long, soft, straight, forward spreading hairs. Leaves are egg-shaped to narrowly ovate, 5–10 mm (0.20–0.39 in) long, 1–2 mm (0.039–0.079 in) wide, smooth, margins incurved and ending with a point at the apex. Bracts 4–6 mm (0.16–0.24 in) long, moderately to thickly hairy, pedicels 0.5 mm (0.020 in) long, calyx 5–5.5 mm (0.20–0.22 in) long, lobes moderately covered in long, soft, straight hairs. Flowers are yellow with reddish markings, standard petal about 9–11 mm (0.35–0.43 in) long. Flowering occurs from September to October and the fruit is a pod up to 5 mm (0.20 in) long.

== Taxonomy and naming ==
This species was first described in 1825 by Allan Cunningham who gave it the name Pultenaea incurvata. In 1991 Michael Crisp and P.H. Weston changed the name to Almaleea incurvata and the description was published in Telopea. The specific epithet (incurvata) means "incurved" in reference to the leaves.

== Distribution and habitat ==
This species has a restricted distribution and grows in wet locations on sandstone in the Blue Mountains of New South Wales.
