= Brachyloma djerral =

Conservation status
- Priority Three — Poorly Known Taxa (DEC)

Scientific classification
- Kingdom: Plantae
- Clade: Tracheophytes
- Clade: Angiosperms
- Clade: Eudicots
- Clade: Asterids
- Order: Ericales
- Family: Ericaceae
- Genus: Brachyloma
- Species: B. djerral

Binomial name
- Brachyloma djerral Cranfield & Hislop

Species of plant

Brachyloma djerral is a species of flowering plant in the family Ericaceae and is endemic to a small area in the west of Western Australia. It is an erect, compact shrub with narrowly egg-shaped to narrowly elliptic leaves and red, tube-shaped flowers.

== Description ==
Brachyloma djerral is an erect, compact shrub that usually grows to 1.2 m (3 ft 11 in) high and wide and has many stems arising from its base. The leaves are narrowly egg-shaped with the narrower end towards the base to narrowly elliptic, 4.0–7.0 mm (0.16–0.28 in) long and 1.4–2.4 mm (0.055–0.094 in) wide on a petiole 0.4–1 mm (0.016–0.039 in) long, with a sharply-pointed tip. The leaves are glabrous and the lower surface is paler than the upper surface. The flowers are arranged singly in leaf axils with bracts, and bracteoles 1.0–1.8 mm (0.039–0.071 in) long at the base. The sepals are egg-shaped, 2.0–2.4 mm (0.079–0.094 in) long and 1.5–2.2 mm (0.059–0.087 in) wide. The petals are red, and joined to form a tube 3.2–4.5 mm (0.13–0.18 in) long with egg-shaped lobes 1.8–2.7 mm (0.071–0.106 in) long. Flowering time varies with seasonal conditions, but mainly between May and July, and the fruit is a spherical drupe 3–6 mm (0.12–0.24 in) long and 5.0–7.5 mm (0.20–0.30 in) wide.

== Taxonomy and naming ==
Brachyloma djerral was first formally described 2017 by Raymond Cranfield and Michael Hislop in the journal Nuytsia from specimens collected north-east of Kalbarri in 2005. The specific epithet (djerral) is a Noongar word meaning "the north", referring to the distribution of this species.

== Distribution ==
This species of shrub grows in low, open woodland and heath in a small area near and to the east and north-east of Kalbarri, in the Geraldton Sandplains and Yalgoo bioregions of south-western Western Australia.

== Conservation status ==
Brachyloma djerral is listed as "Priority Three" by the Western Australian Government Department of Biodiversity, Conservation and Attractions, meaning that it is poorly known and known from only a few locations but is not under imminent threat.
