= Brachyloma pirara =

Conservation status
- Priority Two — Poorly Known Taxa (DEC)

Scientific classification
- Kingdom: Plantae
- Clade: Tracheophytes
- Clade: Angiosperms
- Clade: Eudicots
- Clade: Asterids
- Order: Ericales
- Family: Ericaceae
- Genus: Brachyloma
- Species: B. pirara

Binomial name
- Brachyloma pirara Cranfield & Hislop

Species of plant

Brachyloma pirara is a species of flowering plant in the family Ericaceae and is endemic a restricted area in the west of Western Australia. It is an erect, compact shrub with sharply-pointed, linear to narrowly egg-shaped or narrowly elliptic leaves, and red, tube-shaped flowers.

== Description ==
Brachyloma pirara is an erect, compact shrub that usually grows to 60 cm (24 in) high and wide and has many stems arising from its base. The leaves are sharply-pointed, linear to narrowly egg-shaped with the narrower end towards the base to narrowly elliptic, 5.0–8.0 mm (0.20–0.31 in) long and 1.2–2.2 mm (0.047–0.087 in) wide on a petiole 0.4–0.8 mm (0.016–0.031 in) long. The leaves are moderately hairy, more so on the lower surface and the lower surface is paler than the upper surface. The flowers are arranged singly in leaf axils with egg-shaped bracts 0.3–1.2 mm (0.012–0.047 in) long and bracteoles 1.8–2.8 mm (0.071–0.110 in) long and 1.7–2.5 mm (0.067–0.098 in) wide at the base. The sepals are broadly egg-shaped, 3.0–3.6 mm (0.12–0.14 in) long and 2.0–2.7 mm (0.079–0.106 in) wide, straw-coloured with red tinges near the edges. The petals are red, and joined to form a tube 3.6–4.6 mm (0.14–0.18 in) long with egg-shaped lobes 2.6–3.5 mm (0.10–0.14 in) long. Flowering occurs between late autumn and late winter, sometimes after rain at other times, and the fruit is a broadly elliptic drupe about 5.0–6.0 mm (0.20–0.24 in) long and wide.

== Taxonomy and naming ==
Brachyloma pirara was first formally described 2017 by Raymond Cranfield and Michael Hislop in the journal Nuytsia from specimens collected by Hislop near Northampton in 2005. The specific epithet (pirara) is a Nyoongar word meaning "sand" or "sandy place".

== Distribution ==
This species of shrub grows in yellow sandplains in low woodland or heath between Kalbarri National Park and Whicherina on the Geraldton to Mount Magnet Road, in the Geraldton Sandplains bioregion of south-western Western Australia.

== Conservation status ==
Brachyloma pirara is listed as "Priority Two" by the Western Australian Government Department of Biodiversity, Conservation and Attractions, meaning that it is poorly known and from only one or a few locations.
