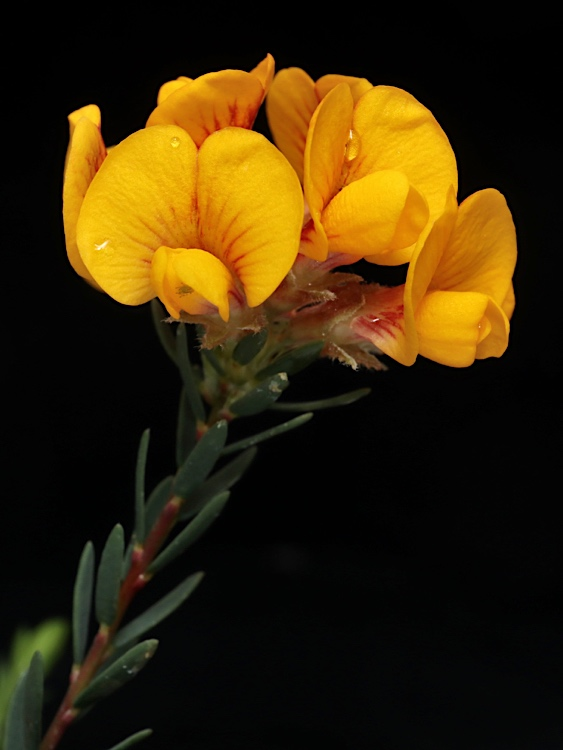

Scientific classification
- Kingdom: Plantae
- Clade: Embryophytes
- Clade: Tracheophytes
- Clade: Spermatophytes
- Clade: Angiosperms
- Clade: Eudicots
- Clade: Rosids
- Order: Fabales
- Family: Fabaceae
- Subfamily: Faboideae
- Genus: Almaleea
- Species: A. capitata

Binomial name
- Almaleea capitata (J.H.Willis) Crisp & P.H.Weston

= Almaleea capitata =

Species of plant

Almaleea capitata commonly known as slender parrot pea, is a flowering plant in the family Fabaceae. It is a small procumbent or upright shrub with clusters of yellow flowers and grows in New South Wales and Victoria.

== Description ==
Almaleea capitata is a slender, procumbent or upright shrub to 1.2 m (3 ft 11 in) high with stems moderately covered with flattened, short, soft hairs. The leaves are variable, oblong to elliptic or linear, 3–9 mm (0.12–0.35 in) long, 0.5–1.5 mm (0.020–0.059 in) wide, margins usually rolled inward, lower surface warty and ending in a point at the apex. Bracts 2–2.5 mm (0.079–0.098 in) long, sometimes stiff and pointed, outer bracts oval to broadly oval shaped, smooth or with occasional hairs, inner bracts oval-shaped and moderately hairy. Calyx 3–4 mm (0.12–0.16 in) long, flowers in dense clusters of 4-10, pedicels 1–2.5 mm (0.039–0.098 in) long, floral tube sparsely hairy, yellow standard petal 5–10 mm (0.20–0.39 in) long. Flowering occurs in December and the fruit is a 3–4 mm (0.12–0.16 in) long pod.

== Taxonomy and naming ==
This species was described in 1957 by James Hamlyn Willis who gave it the name Dillwynia capitata. In 1991 Michael Crisp and P.H.Weston changed the name to Almaleea capitata and the description was published in Telopea.The specific epithet (capitata) is in reference to the "flower heads".

== Distribution and habitat ==
Almaleea capitata usually grows on granite in swampy heath in subalpine locations in New South Wales and Victoria.
