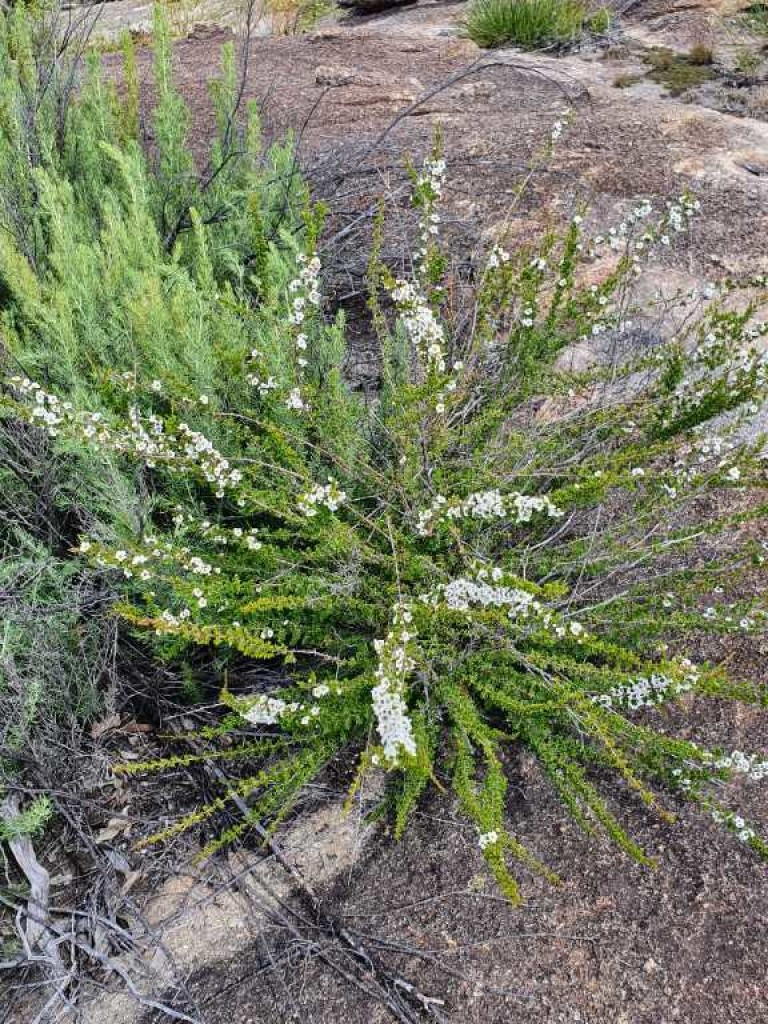

Scientific classification
- Kingdom: Plantae
- Clade: Tracheophytes
- Clade: Angiosperms
- Clade: Eudicots
- Clade: Rosids
- Order: Myrtales
- Family: Myrtaceae
- Genus: Kardomia
- Species: K. odontocalyx

Binomial name
- Kardomia odontocalyx (A.R.Bean) Peter G.Wilson

= Kardomia odontocalyx =

Species of shrub

Kardomia odontocalyx is a flowering plant in the family Myrtaceae and grows in northern New South Wales and Queensland.

== Description ==
Kardomia odontocalyx is a shrub to 2 m (6 ft 7 in) high with linear shaped leaves 3.1–4.5 mm (0.12–0.18 in) long, 0.5–0.8 mm (0.020–0.031 in) wide, rounded or notched at the apex, margins smooth, oil glands on the lower surface and on a petiole about 0.5 mm (0.020 in) long. The flowers are borne singly on a [pedicel 0.5–2 mm (0.020–0.079 in) long, peduncle 0.6–1 mm (0.024–0.039 in) long and the bracteoles linear-shaped and about 2.5 mm (0.098 in) long. The corolla up to 8 mm (0.31 in) in diameter and the white petals about 2.6–3.1 mm (0.10–0.12 in) long. The fruit is a capsule about 3.2 mm (0.13 in) in diameter.

== Taxonomy and naming ==
This species was described in 1997 by A.R.Bean as Babingtonia odontocalyx. In 2007 Peter G.Wilson changed the name to Kardomia odontocalyx and the description was published in Australian Systematic Botany. The specific epithet (odontocalyx) means "toothed calyx".

== Distribution and habitat ==
Kardomia odontocalyx has a restricted distribution in New South Wales near Torrington and Emmaville districts and Queensland on granite hills and outcrops in heath and sclerophyll scrub.
