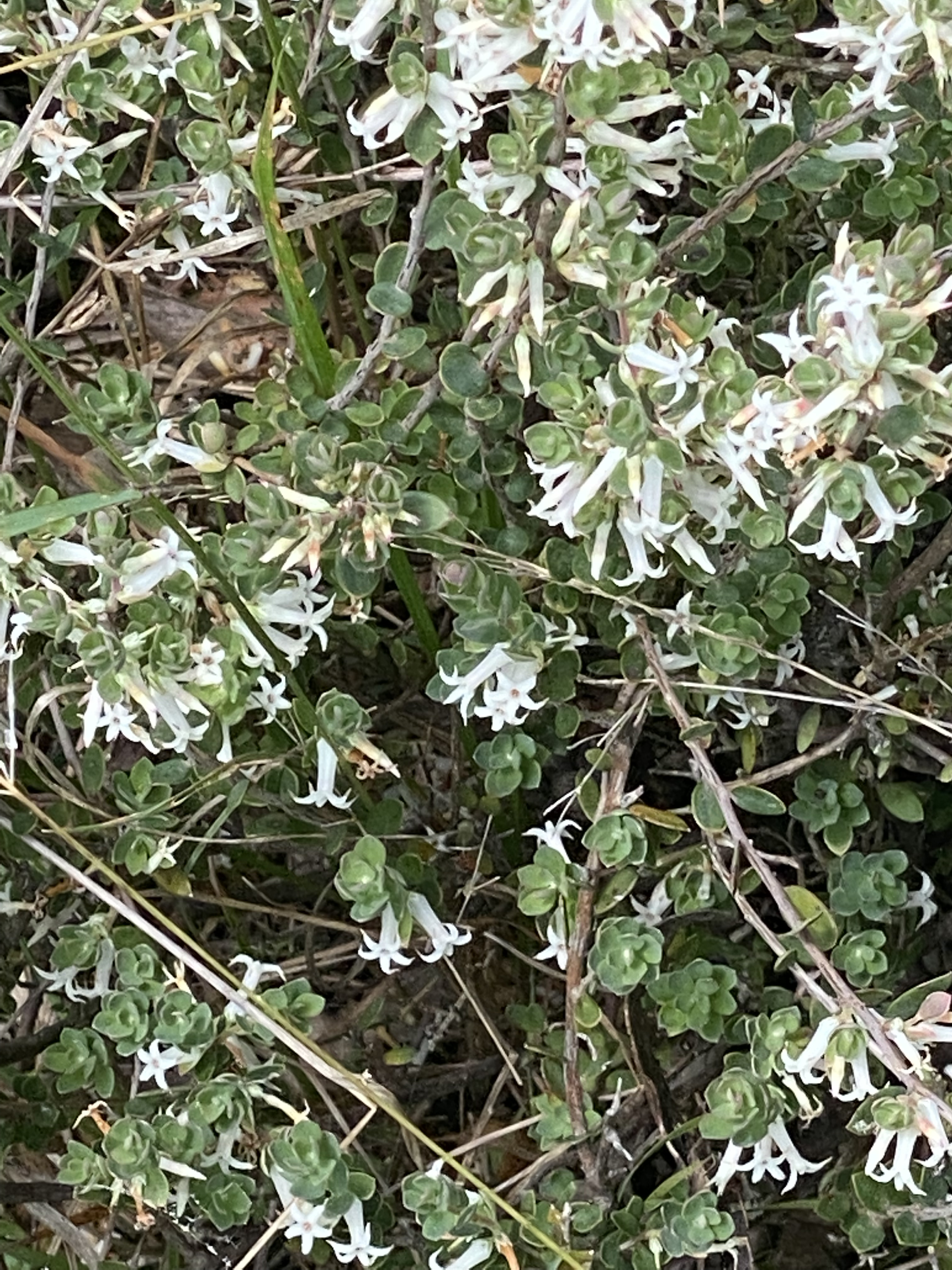

Scientific classification
- Kingdom: Plantae
- Clade: Embryophytes
- Clade: Tracheophytes
- Clade: Spermatophytes
- Clade: Angiosperms
- Clade: Eudicots
- Clade: Asterids
- Order: Ericales
- Family: Ericaceae
- Genus: Brachyloma
- Species: B. daphnoides

Binomial name
- Brachyloma daphnoides (Sm.) Benth.

Synonyms
- Lissanthe daphnoides (Sm.) R.Br.; Styphelia daphnoides Sm.

= Brachyloma daphnoides =

Daphne heath

Species of plant

Brachyloma daphnoides, commonly known as daphne heath, is a flowering plant in the family Ericaceae. It is a small upright shrub with dull grey-green leaves and white tubular flowers.

== Description ==
Brachyloma daphnoides is a small, upright shrub that usually grows to a height of 0.4 and 1.5 metres (1 ft 4 in and 4 ft 11 in) high and branches covered in long, upright, stiff hairs. The dull grey-green leaves may be egg-shaped, obovate, elliptic, or more or less circular, flattish, tightly overlap along the stems, 4 to 15 millimetres (0.16 to 0.59 in) long, 1.7 to 3.6 millimetres (0.067 to 0.142 in) wide. The upper surface is glossy green, underneath paler, smooth or hairy, petiole 0.9–1.2 mm (0.035–0.047 in) long, and rounded or pointed at the apex. The cream-white flowers are borne in leaf axils, scented, sometimes grouped, corolla tubular, 4.3–5.5 mm (0.17–0.22 in) long with recurved lobes 1.8–2.4 mm (0.071–0.094 in) long. Flowering occurs from June to November and the fruit is a rounded, ridged, slightly flattened yellowish-brown berry about 4 mm (0.16 in) in diameter and 2–3 mm (0.079–0.118 in) long.

== Taxonomy and naming ==
Brachyloma daphnoides was first formally described 1868 by James Edward Smith and the description was published in Flora Australiensis. The specific epithet (daphnoides) means like "daphne".

== Distribution and habitat ==
Daphne heath grows mostly on rocky sites in woodland and forests in South Australia, Victoria, New South Wales and Queensland.
