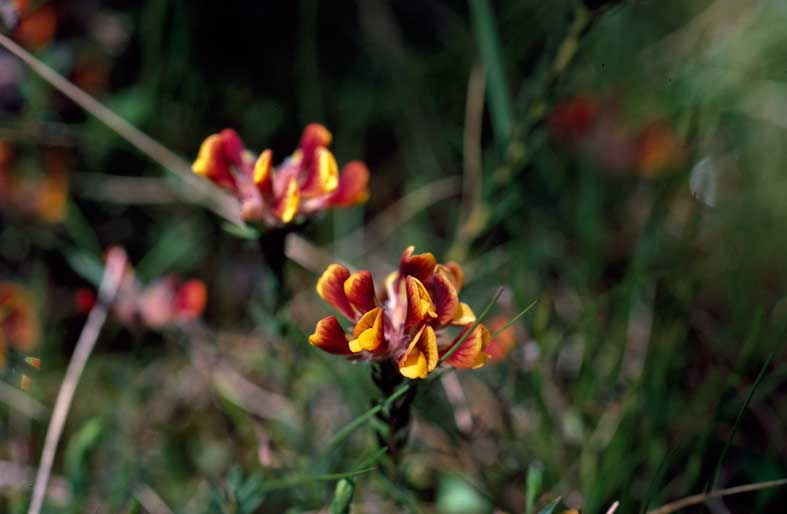

Scientific classification
- Kingdom: Plantae
- Clade: Embryophytes
- Clade: Tracheophytes
- Clade: Spermatophytes
- Clade: Angiosperms
- Clade: Eudicots
- Clade: Rosids
- Order: Fabales
- Family: Fabaceae
- Subfamily: Faboideae
- Genus: Almaleea
- Species: A. subumbellata

Binomial name
- Almaleea subumbellata (Hook.) Crisp & P.H.Weston

= Almaleea subumbellata =

Species of plant

Almaleea subumbellata commonly known as wiry bush pea, is a flowering plant in the family Fabaceae. It is a small procumbent or upright shrub with clusters of yellow flowers and grows in New South Wales, Tasmania and Victoria.

== Description ==
Almaleea subumbellata is an upright or procumbent shrub to 1.2 m (3 ft 11 in) high, stems smooth to moderately hairy. Leaves are oblong to narrowly elliptic, alternating along the stem, 5–12 mm (0.20–0.47 in) long, 1–2 mm (0.039–0.079 in) wide, smooth, or occasionally sparsely covered in long, soft, straight hairs, margins mostly flat or incurved, rounded to acute at the apex. The pea-shaped flowers are in a tight, terminal cluster of 4-10, orange to yellow with reddish markings, 5 petalled, calyx 3.5–5 mm (0.14–0.20 in) long, floral tube smooth, bracts mostly stiffly pointed and 2–3 mm (0.079–0.118 in) long. Flowering occurs in spring and the fruit is pod 3–6 mm (0.12–0.24 in) long.

== Taxonomy ==
In 1833 William Jackson Hooker gave this species the name Pultenaea subumbellata. In 1991 Michael Crisp and P.H Weston changed the name to Almaleea subumbellata and the description was published in Telopea.

== Distribution and habitat ==
Wiry bush pea grows in swampy heath mostly at higher altitudes in New South Wales, Victoria and Tasmania.
