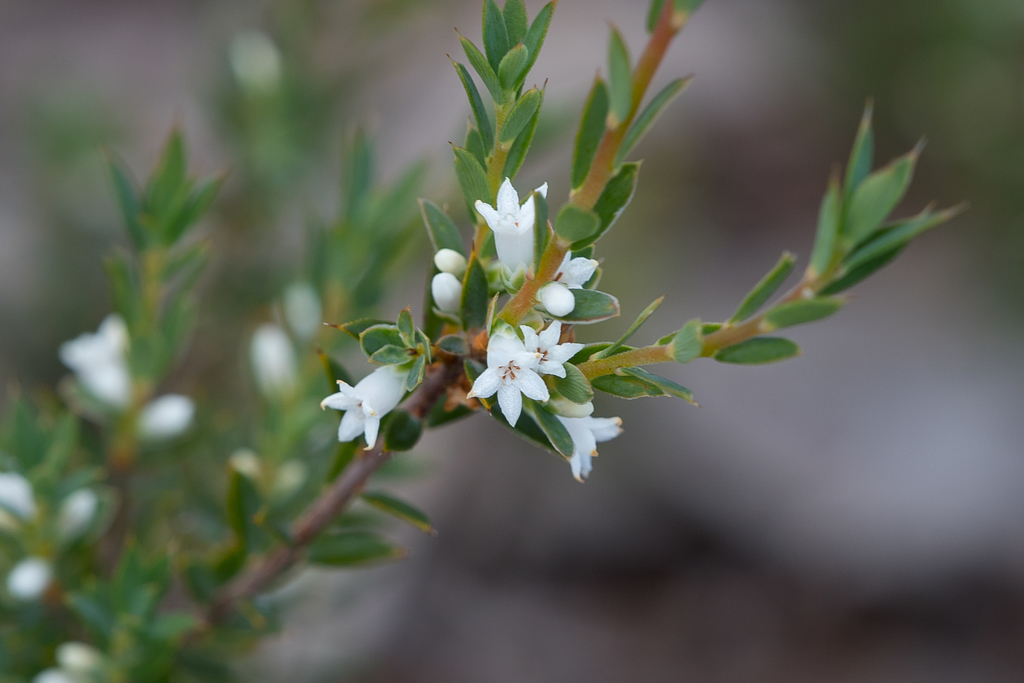
- In Cox Scrub Conservation Park

Scientific classification
- Kingdom: Plantae
- Clade: Tracheophytes
- Clade: Angiosperms
- Clade: Eudicots
- Clade: Asterids
- Order: Ericales
- Family: Ericaceae
- Genus: Brachyloma
- Species: B. ciliatum

Binomial name
- Brachyloma ciliatum (R.Br.) Benth.

Synonyms
- Brachyloma ciliatum (R.Br.) Benth. var. ciliatum; Brachyloma ciliatum var. intermedium Rodway; Lissanthe ciliata R.Br.; Styphelia ciliata (R.Br.) F.Muell.

= Brachyloma ciliatum =

Species of plant

Brachyloma ciliatum, commonly known as fringed brachyloma or fringed daphne heath, is a species of flowering plant in the family Ericaceae and is endemic to south-eastern Australia. It is a low-lying or erect shrub with upwards-pointing, egg-shaped to oblong leaves and white, tube-shaped flowers.

== Description ==
Brachyloma ciliatum is a low-lying or erect shrub that typically grows to a height of about 30 cm (12 in) and forms suckers. Its branchlets are softly- or shaggy-hairy. The leaves are directed upwards, egg-shaped to oblong, 4–14 mm (0.16–0.55 in) long and 1.0–3.3 mm (0.039–0.130 in) wide with a small point on the tip. The flowers are arranged singly in leaf axils on a peduncle 0.5–1 mm (0.020–0.039 in) long, with egg-shaped bracteoles 1.2–2.0 mm (0.047–0.079 in) long at the base. The sepals are egg-shaped, 1.5–2.0 mm (0.059–0.079 in) long and the petals white, joined to form a cylindrical tube 2–3 mm (0.079–0.118 in) long with spreading to curved lobes 1.2–2.5 mm (0.047–0.098 in) long and bearded inside. Flowering occurs from October to January and the fruit is a glabrous, oval to spherical drupe 2.6–3.0 mm (0.10–0.12 in) long.

== Taxonomy and naming ==
This species was first formally described 1810 by Robert Brown, who gave it the name Lissanthe ciliata in his Prodromus Florae Novae Hollandiae et Insulae Van Diemen. In 1868, George Bentham changed the name to Brachyloma ciliatum in Flora Australiensis. The specific epithet (ciliatum) means "fringed with fine hairs".

== Distribution ==
Brachyloma ciliatum grows in heathland and woodland, in the west of Victoria, and in the north, east and south-east of Tasmania.
