= Kardomia =

Scientific classification
- Kingdom: Plantae
- Clade: Tracheophytes
- Clade: Angiosperms
- Clade: Eudicots
- Clade: Rosids
- Order: Myrtales
- Family: Myrtaceae
- Subfamily: Myrtoideae
- Tribe: Chamelaucieae
- Genus: Kardomia; Peter G.Wilson

Genus of flowering plants

Kardomia is a genus of flowering plants in the family Myrtaceae and is endemic to eastern Australia. Plants in the genus Kardomia are shrubs with leaves arranged in opposite pairs and with flowers with a ridged or rough floral cup, five petals and four to thirteen stamens.

== Description ==
Plants in the genus Kardomia are shrubs with simple leaves arranged in opposite pairs. The flowers are usually arranged singly and have a ridged, rough or pimply floral cup that usually tapers to the pedicel. The sepals have a thinly-textured inner lobe, the swelling at the back of the sepal thickened and often pointed. Each flower has five white petals and four to thirteen stamens. The fruit is a thin-walled capsule containing flattened D-shaped seeds.

== Taxonomy ==
The genus was Kardomia was first formally described in 2007 by Peter Wilson in Australian Systematic Botany, and the first species to be described (the type species) was K. squarrulosa, and includes species previously included in Baeckea and Babingtonia.

The following is a list of species of Kardomia accepted by the Australian Plant Census as of August 2023:

- Kardomia granitica (A.R.Bean) Peter G.Wilson (Qld.)
- Kardomia jucunda (S.T.Blake) Peter G.Wilson (Qld., N.S.W.)
- Kardomia odontocalyx (A.R.Bean) Peter G.Wilson (N.S.W.)
- Kardomia prominens (A.R.Bean) Peter G.Wilson (N.S.W.)
- Kardomia silvestris (A.R.Bean) Peter G.Wilson (Qld., N.S.W.)
- Kardomia squarrulosa (Domin) Peter G.Wilson (Qld.)
