= Warialda State Conservation Area =

- IUCN category II (national park)
- Location within New South Wales
- Location: New South Wales
- Nearest city: Warialda
- Coordinates: 29.63°S 150.57°E
- Area: 29.13 km^{2} (11.25 sq mi)
- Established: 2005
- Governing body: NSW National Parks and Wildlife Service
- Website: Official website

Warialda State Conservation Area is a conservation area in New South Wales close to Warialda.

The conservation area is home to many species of plants, including Persoonia terminalis.
