= Almaleea =

Scientific classification
- Kingdom: Plantae
- Clade: Tracheophytes
- Clade: Angiosperms
- Clade: Eudicots
- Clade: Rosids
- Order: Fabales
- Family: Fabaceae
- Subfamily: Faboideae
- Clade: Mirbelioids
- Genus: Almaleea; Crisp & P.H.Weston

Type species
- Almaleea incurvata (A.Cunn.) Crisp & P.H.Weston

Species
- See text.

Genus of legumes

Almaleea is a genus of perennial shrubs from the family Fabaceae native to Australia.

== Species ==
Almaleea comprises the following species:

- Almaleea cambagei (Maiden & Betche) Crisp & P.H. Weston
- Almaleea capitata (J.H.Willis) Crisp & P.H.Weston
- Almaleea incurvata (A.Cunn.) Crisp & P.H.Weston
- Almaleea paludosa (J.Thompson) Crisp & P.H.Weston
- Almaleea subumbellata (Hook.) Crisp & P.H.Weston
