= Brachyloma geissoloma =

Scientific classification
- Kingdom: Plantae
- Clade: Tracheophytes
- Clade: Angiosperms
- Clade: Eudicots
- Clade: Asterids
- Order: Ericales
- Family: Ericaceae
- Genus: Brachyloma
- Species: B. geissoloma

Binomial name
- Brachyloma geissoloma (F.Muell.) Cranfield

Synonyms
- List: Brachyloma concolor F.Muell. nom. inval., pro syn.; Brachyloma concolor Benth. nom. illeg., nom. superfl.; Brachyloma ericoides subsp. occidentale Cranfield MS; Brachyloma geissoloma (F.Muell.) Cranfield MS; Brachyloma geissoloma subsp. collinum Cranfield MS; Brachyloma geissoloma subsp. ovatum Cranfield MS; Brachyloma moolya Cranfield MS; Cyathodes brachyloma F.Muell. nom. inval., pro syn.; Stenanthera brachyloma F.Muell.; Styphelia geissoloma F.Muell.

Species of plant

Brachyloma geissoloma is a species of flowering plant in the family Ericaceae and is endemic to the south of Western Australia. It is an erect, bushy shrub with oblong or lance-shaped leaves with the narrower end toward the base, and red, pink or white, tube-shaped flowers.

== Description ==
Brachyloma geissoloma is an erect, bushy shrub that usually grows to 0.15–1.2 m (5.9 in – 3 ft 11.2 in) high. Its leaves are oblong or lance-shaped with the narrower end toward the base, 6.5–8.5 mm (0.26–0.33 in) long on short petiolate. Both surfaces of the leaves are smooth and shiny, and there is a small, fine point on the tip. The flowers are arranged on a peduncle less than 2 mm (0.079 in) long with minute bracts and small bracteoles at the base. The sepals are about 1.6 mm (0.063 in) long, and the petals are red, pink or white and joined to form a tube, the lobes as long as the tube. Flowering occurs between April and September.

== Taxonomy and naming ==
This species was first formally described 1864 by Ferdinand von Mueller in his Fragmenta Phytographiae Australiae, who gave it the name Stenanthera brachyloma from specimens collected by George Maxwell near the Great Australian Bight. In 2017, Raymond Cranfield transferred the species to Brachyloma as B. geissoloma in the journal Nuytsia. The specific epithet (geissoloma) means "a cornice-like hem", referring to tufts of hairs inside the petal tube.

== Distribution ==
Brachyloma geissoloma grows on sandplains, dunes and rocky slopes in the Coolgardie, Esperance Plains and Mallee bioregions of southern Western Australia.
