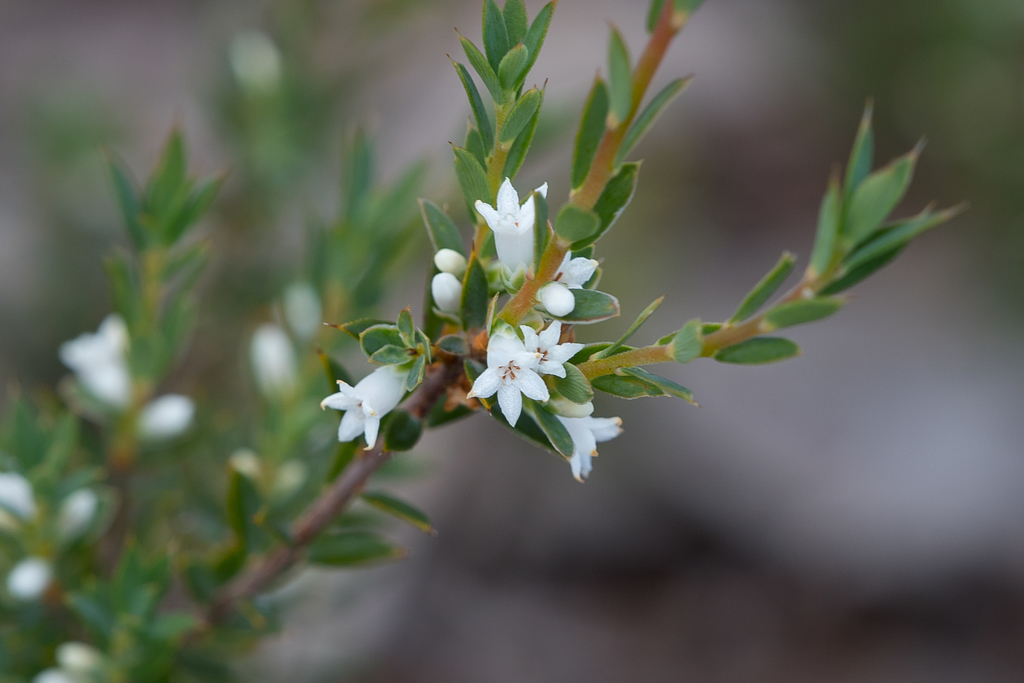
- Brachyloma ciliatum in Cox Scrub Conservation Park

Scientific classification
- Kingdom: Plantae
- Clade: Tracheophytes
- Clade: Angiosperms
- Clade: Eudicots
- Clade: Asterids
- Order: Ericales
- Family: Ericaceae
- Subfamily: Epacridoideae
- Tribe: Styphelieae
- Genus: Brachyloma; Sond.

Synonyms
- Lobopogon Schltdl.

= Brachyloma =

Genus of flowering plants

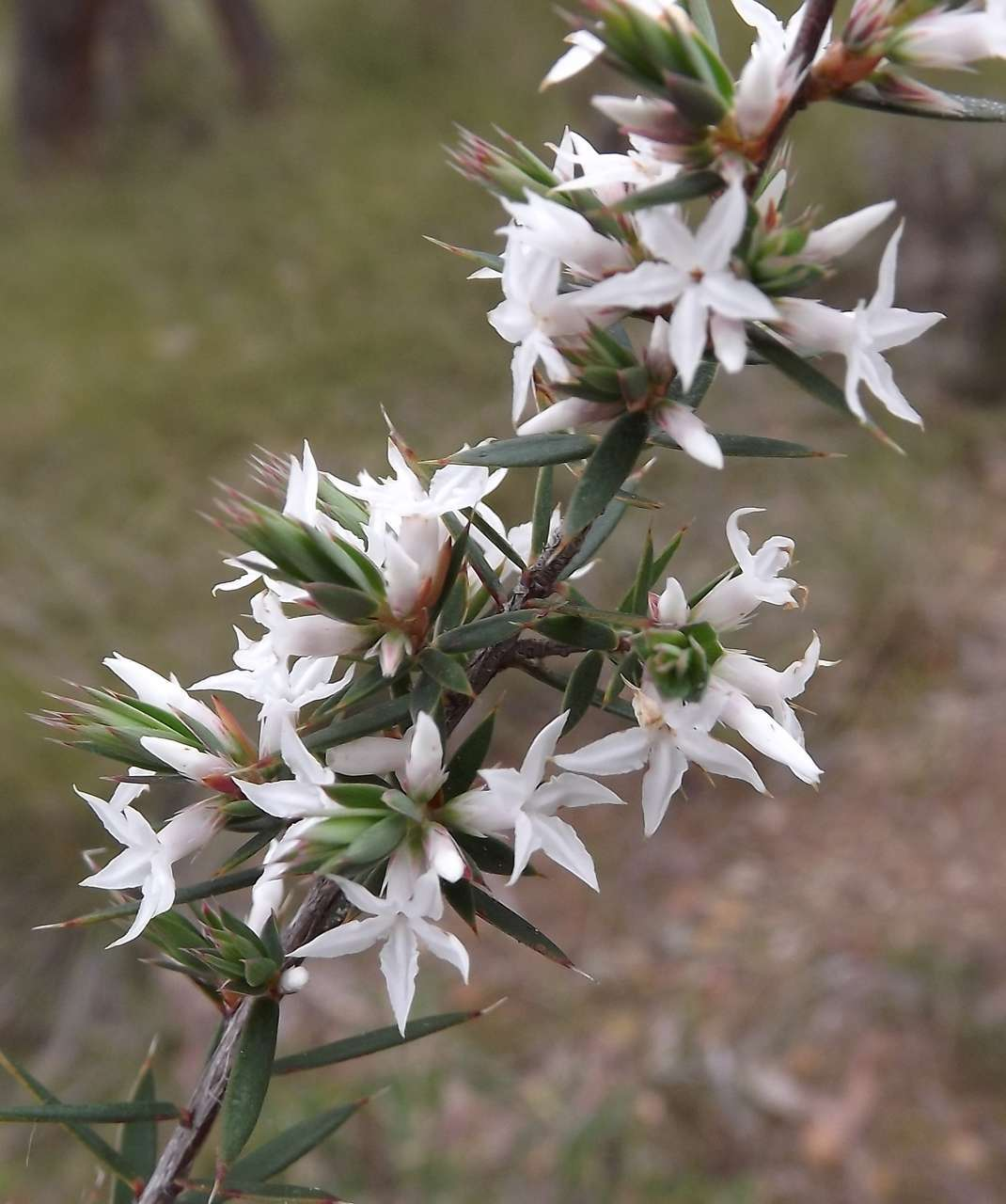
Brachyloma depressum in Grampians National Park

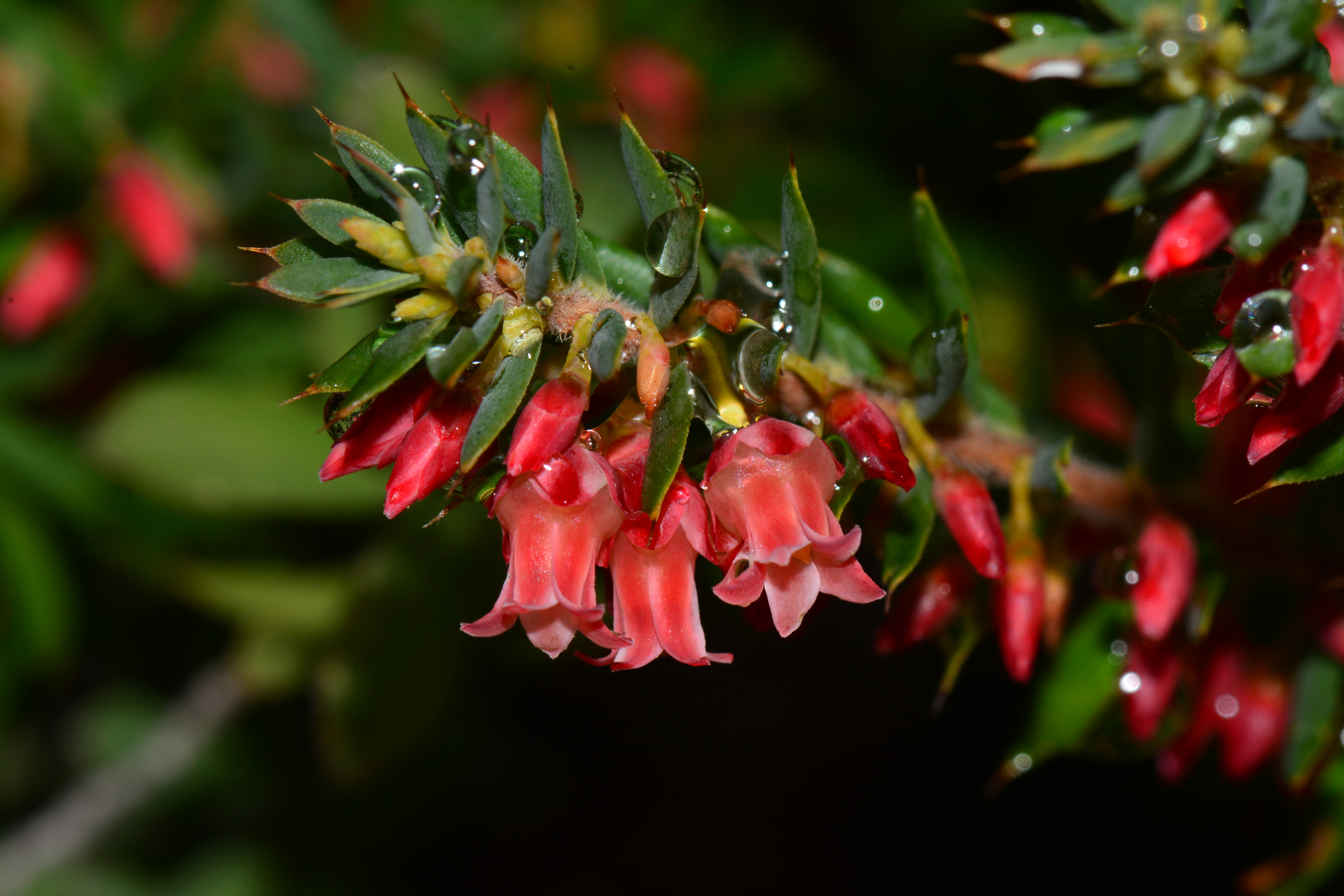
Brachyloma preissii

Brachyloma is a genus of about 16 species of flowering plants in the family Ericaceae and is endemic to Australia. Plants in the genus Brachyloma are shrubs with more or less erect leaves and bisexual flowers usually arranged singly in leaf axils, the 5 petals fused to form a cylindrical or bell-shaped tube, the stamens sometimes enclosed in the petal tube.

== Description ==
Plant in the genus Brachyloma are erect or spreading shrubs with simple, sessile or shortly petiolate leaves with more or less parallel or spreading veins on the lower surface. The flowers are bisexual and usually arranged singly in leaf axils, each flower with a bract at the base and bracteoles grading to the size of the 5 sepals. The 5 petals are fused at the base to form a cylindrical to bulbous, bell-shaped tube with erect to curved-back lobes. The fruit is a drupe with a hard endocarp.

== Taxonomy ==
The genus Brachyloma was first formally described in 1845 by Otto Wilhelm Sonder in Lehmnn's Plantae Preissianae and the first species he described (the type species) was Brachyloma preissii.

=== Species list ===
The following is a list of Brachyloma species accepted by the Australian Plant Census as of 10 September 2023:

- Brachyloma baxteri (A.Cunn. ex DC.) Puente-Lel. (W.A.)
- Brachyloma ciliatum (R.Br.) Benth. – fringed brachyloma, fringed daphne heath (Vic., Tas.)
- Brachyloma daphnoides (Sm.) Benth. - daphne heath (S.A., Vic, N.S.W., Qld.)
- Brachyloma delbi Cranfield (W.A.)
- Brachyloma depressum (F.Muell.) Benth. – spreading brachyloma, spreading heath (Vic., Tas.)
- Brachyloma djerral Cranfield & Hislop (W.A.)
- Brachyloma elusum Hislop & Cranfield (W.A.)
- Brachyloma ericoides (Schltdl.) Sond. (Vic., S.A.)
- Brachyloma geissoloma (F.Muell.) Cranfield (W.A.)
- Brachyloma mogin Cranfield (W.A.)
- Brachyloma nguba Cranfield (W.A.)
- Brachyloma pirara Cranfield & Hislop (W.A.)
- Brachyloma preissii Sond. (W.A.)
- Brachyloma saxicola J.T.Hunter (N.S.W.)
- Brachyloma scortechinii F.Muell. (Qld., N.S.W.)
- Brachyloma stenolobum Hislop & Cranfield (W.A.)

== Distribution ==
Species of Brachyloma occur in all Australian states and the Australian Capital Territory, but not the Northern Territory.
