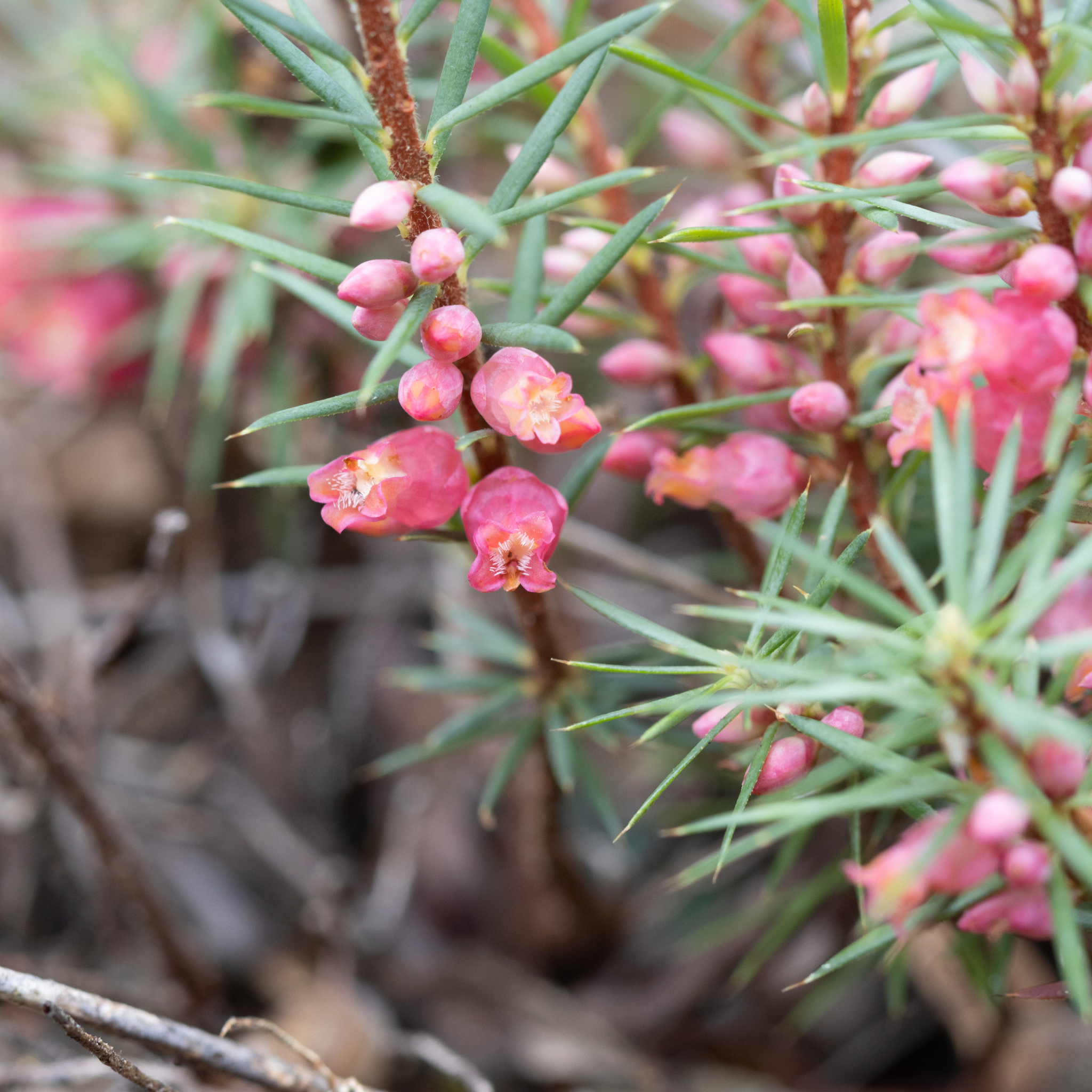
- In Cox Scrub Conservation Park

Conservation status
- Priority Two — Poorly Known Taxa (DEC)

Scientific classification
- Kingdom: Plantae
- Clade: Tracheophytes
- Clade: Angiosperms
- Clade: Eudicots
- Clade: Asterids
- Order: Ericales
- Family: Ericaceae
- Genus: Brachyloma
- Species: B. ericoides

Binomial name
- Brachyloma ericoides (Schltdl.) Sond.

Synonyms
- Lobopogon ericoides Schltdl.; Stenanthera ericoides (Schltdl.) F.Muell.; Styphelia lobopogona F.Muell.

= Brachyloma ericoides =

Species of plant

Brachyloma ericoides is a species of flowering plant in the family Ericaceae and is endemic to the south-east of continental Australia. It is an erect or spreading shrub with linear to narrowly elliptic leaves and usually pink, tube-shaped flowers.

== Description ==
Brachyloma ericoides is an erect or spreading shrub that usually grows to 20–60 cm (7.9–23.6 in) high and has softly-hairy branchlets. The leaves are linear to narrowly elliptic, 4–13 mm (0.16–0.51 in) long and 0.7–1.5 mm (0.028–0.059 in) wide on a petiole 0.7–1.1 mm (0.028–0.043 in) long. The leaves are more or less glabrous and the lower surface is paler than the upper surface. The flowers are arranged singly in leaf axils with broadly egg-shaped to round bracts 6–17 mm (0.24–0.67 in) long and bracteoles 1.3–3 mm (0.051–0.118 in) long at the base. The sepals are egg-shaped, 2.8–4.3 mm (0.11–0.17 in) long and the petals are pink, sometimes white, and joined to form a tube 3.5–5 mm (0.14–0.20 in) long with lobes 2.0–2.7 mm (0.079–0.106 in) long. Flowering occurs between April and November, and the fruit is a more or less spherical drupe 3.5–5 mm (0.14–0.20 in) long.

== Taxonomy and naming ==
This species was first formally described 1854 by Diederich Franz Leonhard von Schlechtendal, who gave it the name Lobopogon ericoides in the journal Linnaea. In Otto Wilhelm Sonder transferred the species to Brachyloma as B. ericoides.

In 1982, Robert John Bates described two subspecies of B. ericoides, and the names are accepted by the Australian Plant Census:

- Brachyloma ericoides subsp. bicolour has leaves 10–16 mm (0.39–0.63 in) long, pale green bracteoles, sepals and petal tube, and bright orange-yellow petal lobes.
- Brachyloma eridoides subsp. ericoides has leaves 5–12 mm (0.20–0.47 in) long, pink bracteoles, sepals and petal tube, and pink to reddish petal lobes.

== Distribution ==
Brachyloma ericoides grows in sandy soils, or with limestone. Brachyloma ericoides subsp. ericoides is found in western Victoria and south western South Australia, but species bicolor only occurs on Kangaroo Island.
