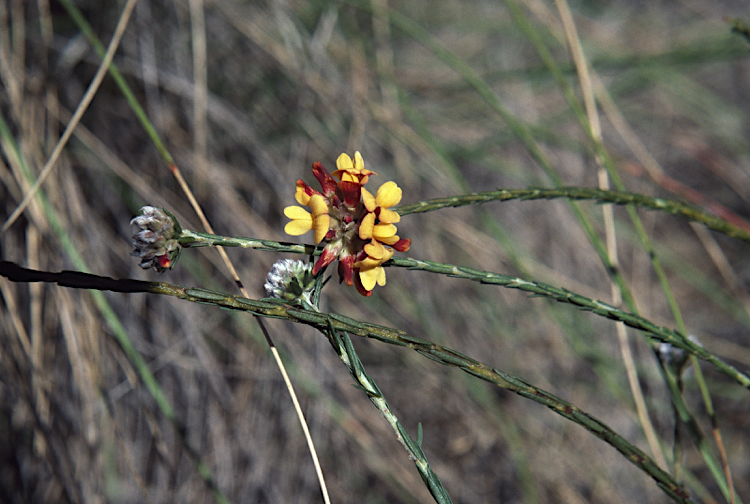

Scientific classification
- Kingdom: Plantae
- Clade: Embryophytes
- Clade: Tracheophytes
- Clade: Spermatophytes
- Clade: Angiosperms
- Clade: Eudicots
- Clade: Rosids
- Order: Fabales
- Family: Fabaceae
- Subfamily: Faboideae
- Genus: Almaleea
- Species: A. cambagei

Binomial name
- Almaleea cambagei (Maiden & Betche) Crisp & P.H.Weston

= Almaleea cambagei =

Species of plant

Almaleea cambagei commonly known as Torrington pea, is a flowering plant in the family Fabaceae. It is a small upright shrub with orange-yellow pea flowers and grows in New South Wales.

== Description ==
Almaleea cambagei is an upright, spindly shrub to 2 m (6 ft 7 in) high, stems sparsely to thickly covered in flattened, short soft hairs. Leaves are narrow-oblong to linear, 3–10 mm (0.12–0.39 in) long, 0.5–1.5 mm (0.020–0.059 in) wide, margins curved inward, lower surface usually warty. Yellow orange pea flowers about 5 mm (0.20 in) wide, borne at the end of stems, pedicels 1–3.5 mm (0.039–0.138 in) long, bracts 2–3 mm (0.079–0.118 in) long, hairy, calyx 4–5 mm (0.16–0.20 in) long, standard petal 8–9 mm (0.31–0.35 in) long. Flowering occurs from September to November and the fruit is a small pod 3–5 mm (0.12–0.20 in) long.

== Taxonomy and naming ==
This species was first described by Joseph Maiden and Daniel Ludwig Ernst Betche in 1908 who gave it the name Pultenaea cambagei. In 1991 Michael Crisp and Peter Henry Weston changed the name to Almaleea cambagei and the description was published in Telopea.

== Distribution and habitat ==
Torrington pea grows in swampy heath at altitudes above 1000 metres in Glencoe and Torrington areas of New South Wales.
