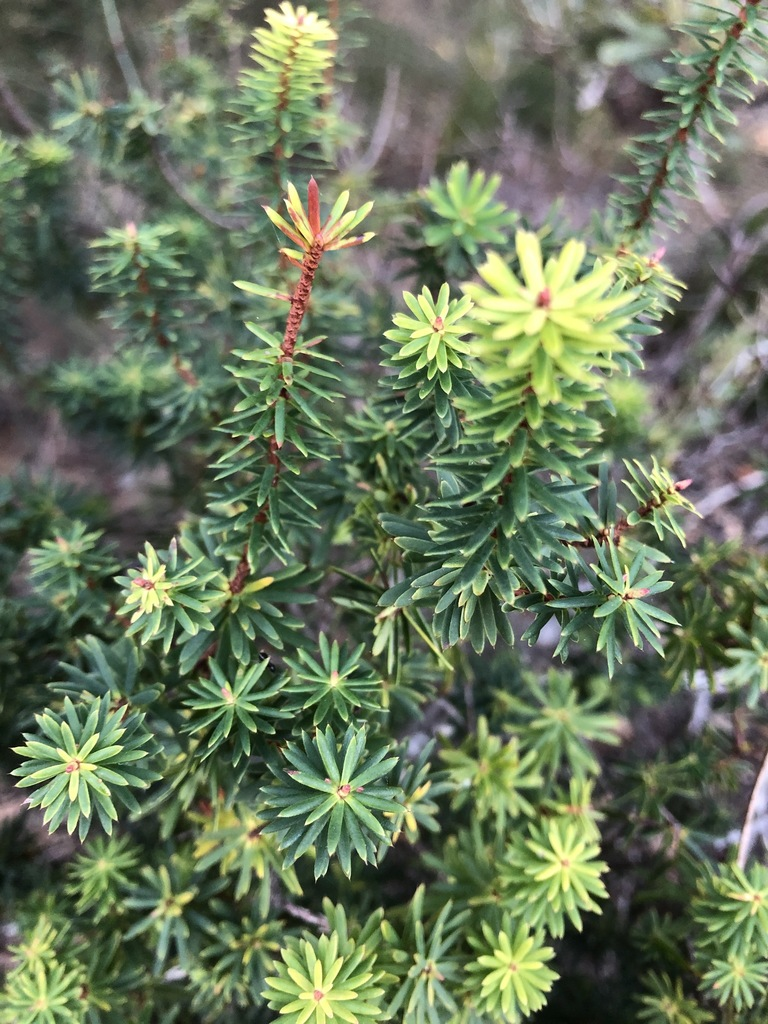
- On Bribie Island

Scientific classification
- Kingdom: Plantae
- Clade: Tracheophytes
- Clade: Angiosperms
- Clade: Eudicots
- Clade: Asterids
- Order: Ericales
- Family: Ericaceae
- Genus: Brachyloma
- Species: B. scortechinii

Binomial name
- Brachyloma scortechinii F.Muell.

= Brachyloma scortechinii =

Species of plant

Brachyloma scortechinii is a species of flowering plant in the family Ericaceae and is endemic to eastern Australia. It is a shrub with narrowly oblong or oblong leaves and translucent, bulbous cylindrical flowers.

== Description ==
Brachyloma scortechinii is a shrub that typically grows to a height of 0.3–1.5 m (1 ft 0 in – 4 ft 11 in) and has glabrous branchlets. The leaves are narrowly oblong to oblong, 6–12 mm (0.24–0.47 in) long and 1–2.7 mm (0.039–0.106 in) wide, sessile, and sometimes have a small point on the tip. The flowers are arranged singly in leaf axils with bracts about 0.3 mm (0.012 in) long and bracteoles 0.6–0.7 mm (0.024–0.028 in) long at the base. The sepals are 1.2–1.5 mm (0.047–0.059 in) long and the petals are translucent, joined to form a bulbous, cylindrical tube 2–4 mm (0.079–0.157 in) long with erect lobes 1.0–1.5 mm (0.039–0.059 in) long. Flowering occurs in April and May and the fruit is a more or less spherical drupe 6–9 mm (0.24–0.35 in) in diameter.

== Taxonomy and naming ==
Brachyloma scortechinii was first formally described 1881 by Ferdinand von Mueller in his Fragmenta Phytographiae Australiae from specimens collected near Burleigh Heads by Benedetto Scortechini. The specific epithet (scortechinii) honours the collector of the type specimens.

== Distribution ==
This species grows in coastal scrub and heath from south-east Queensland to Iluka in New South Wales.
