= Brachyloma elusum =

Conservation status
- Priority Two — Poorly Known Taxa (DEC)

Scientific classification
- Kingdom: Plantae
- Clade: Tracheophytes
- Clade: Angiosperms
- Clade: Eudicots
- Clade: Asterids
- Order: Ericales
- Family: Ericaceae
- Genus: Brachyloma
- Species: B. elusum

Binomial name
- Brachyloma elusum Cranfield & Hislop

Species of plant

Brachyloma elusum is a species of flowering plant in the family Ericaceae and is endemic to a two locations in the west of Western Australia. It is an erect, compact shrub with linear to narrowly egg-shaped leaves with the narrower end toward the base, and red, tube-shaped flowers.

== Description ==
Brachyloma elusum is an erect, compact shrub that usually grows to 80 cm (31 in) high and wide and has many stems arising from its base. The leaves are linear to narrowly egg-shaped with the narrower end towards the base to narrowly elliptic, 4.2–7.5 mm (0.17–0.30 in) long and 1.0–2.0 mm (0.039–0.079 in) wide on a petiole 0.7–1.1 mm (0.028–0.043 in) long, with the edges turned down or rolled under. The leaves are glabrous and the lower surface is paler than the upper surface. The flowers are arranged singly in leaf axils with broadly egg-shaped bracts 0.4–0.6 mm (0.016–0.024 in) long and wide, and bracteoles 0.7–1.0 mm (0.028–0.039 in) long and 0.9–1.1 mm (0.035–0.043 in) wide at the base. The sepals are broadly egg-shaped, 1.0–1.5 mm (0.039–0.059 in) long and wide, often with red tinges near the edges. The petals are red, and joined to form a tube 2.4–3.5 mm (0.094–0.138 in) long with egg-shaped lobes 1.8–2.5 mm (0.071–0.098 in) long. Flowers have been collected between April and July, with the local rainfall determining the onset of flowering, and the fruit is a broadly oval drupe 4.5–6.0 mm (0.18–0.24 in) long and wide.

== Taxonomy and naming ==
Brachyloma elusum was first formally described 2017 by Raymond Cranfield and Michael Hislop in the journal Nuytsia from specimens collected east of Hyden in 2016. The specific epithet (elusum) is a reference to the elusive nature of this species, and the difficulty of finding new populations of this species.

== Distribution ==
This species of shrub grows in yellow sand in tall heathland, and is only known from two populations, one north-east of Narembeen in the Avon Wheatbelt bioregion and the other east of Hyden in the Mallee bioregion of south-western Western Australia.

== Conservation status ==
Brachyloma elusum is listed as "Priority Two" by the Western Australian Government Department of Biodiversity, Conservation and Attractions, meaning that it is poorly known and from only one or a few locations.
