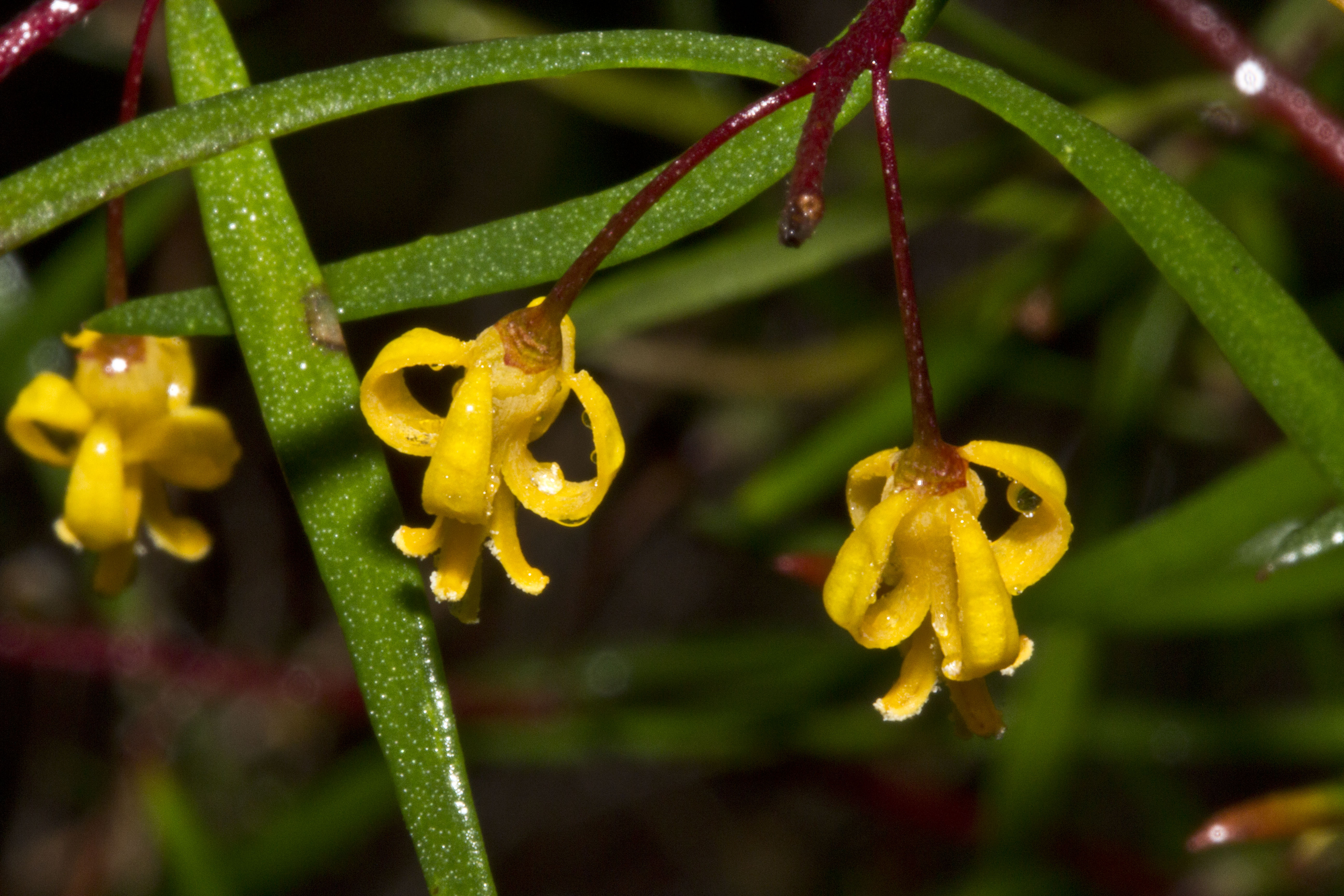
- In Agnes Banks

Conservation status
- Endangered (EPBC Act)

Scientific classification
- Kingdom: Plantae
- Clade: Tracheophytes
- Clade: Angiosperms
- Clade: Eudicots
- Order: Proteales
- Family: Proteaceae
- Genus: Persoonia
- Species: P. nutans

Binomial name
- Persoonia nutans R.Br.

Synonyms
- Linkia nutans (R.Br.) Kuntze; Persoonia apiculata Meisn.; Persoonia nutans var. apiculata (Meisn.) Benth.; Persoonia nutans R.Br. var. nutans

= Persoonia nutans =

Nodding geebung

Species of flowering plant

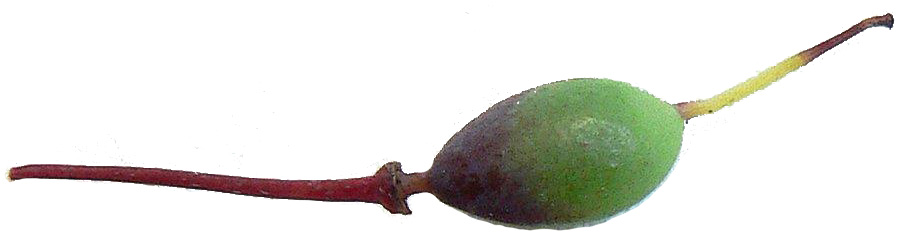
Immature drupe

Persoonia nutans, commonly known as the nodding geebung, is a plant in the family Proteaceae and is endemic to part of the Sydney region in New South Wales. It is an erect to spreading shrub with linear leaves and yellow flowers on down-turned pedicels.

== Description ==
Persoonia nutans is an erect to spreading shrub that typically grows to a height of 0.5–1.5 m (1 ft 8 in – 4 ft 11 in) and has smooth bark and young branchlets with greyish hairs. The leaves are arranged alternately, linear, 10–45 mm (0.39–1.77 in) long and 1.0–1.8 mm (0.039–0.071 in) wide with the edges curved downwards. The flowers are arranged in leaf axils or on the ends of branches in groups of up to forty on a rachis up to 250 mm (9.8 in) long that grows into a leafy shoot after flowering, each flower on a downturned pedicel 7–12 mm (0.28–0.47 in) long with a leaf at its base. The tepals are yellow, 8.5–11 mm (0.33–0.43 in) long and glabrous. Flowering mainly occurs from November to April and the fruit is a green drupe with purple markings.

== Taxonomy ==
Persoonia nutans was first formally described in 1810 by Robert Brown in Transactions of the Linnean Society of London. Brown collected his specimens from near Port Jackson and near Richmond and the Nepean River. In 1991 Peter Weston and Lawrie Johnson designated the Richmond specimens as the lectotype.

== Distribution and habitat ==
Nodding geebung grows in woodland and forest on the Cumberland Plain between Sydney and the Blue Mountains and between Richmond in the north and Macquarie Fields in the south.

== Conservation status ==
Persoonia nutans is listed as "endangered" under the Australian Government Environment Protection and Biodiversity Conservation Act 1999 and the New South Wales Government Threatened Species Conservation Act 1995 and a recovery plan has been prepared. The main threats to the species are loss of habitat due to land clearing, inappropriate fire regimes, habitat degradation and rubbish dumping.
