= Prostanthera staurophylla =

Tenterfield mint-bush

Conservation status
- Vulnerable (EPBC Act)

Scientific classification
- Kingdom: Plantae
- Clade: Tracheophytes
- Clade: Angiosperms
- Clade: Eudicots
- Clade: Asterids
- Order: Lamiales
- Family: Lamiaceae
- Genus: Prostanthera
- Species: P. staurophylla

Binomial name
- Prostanthera staurophylla F.Muell.
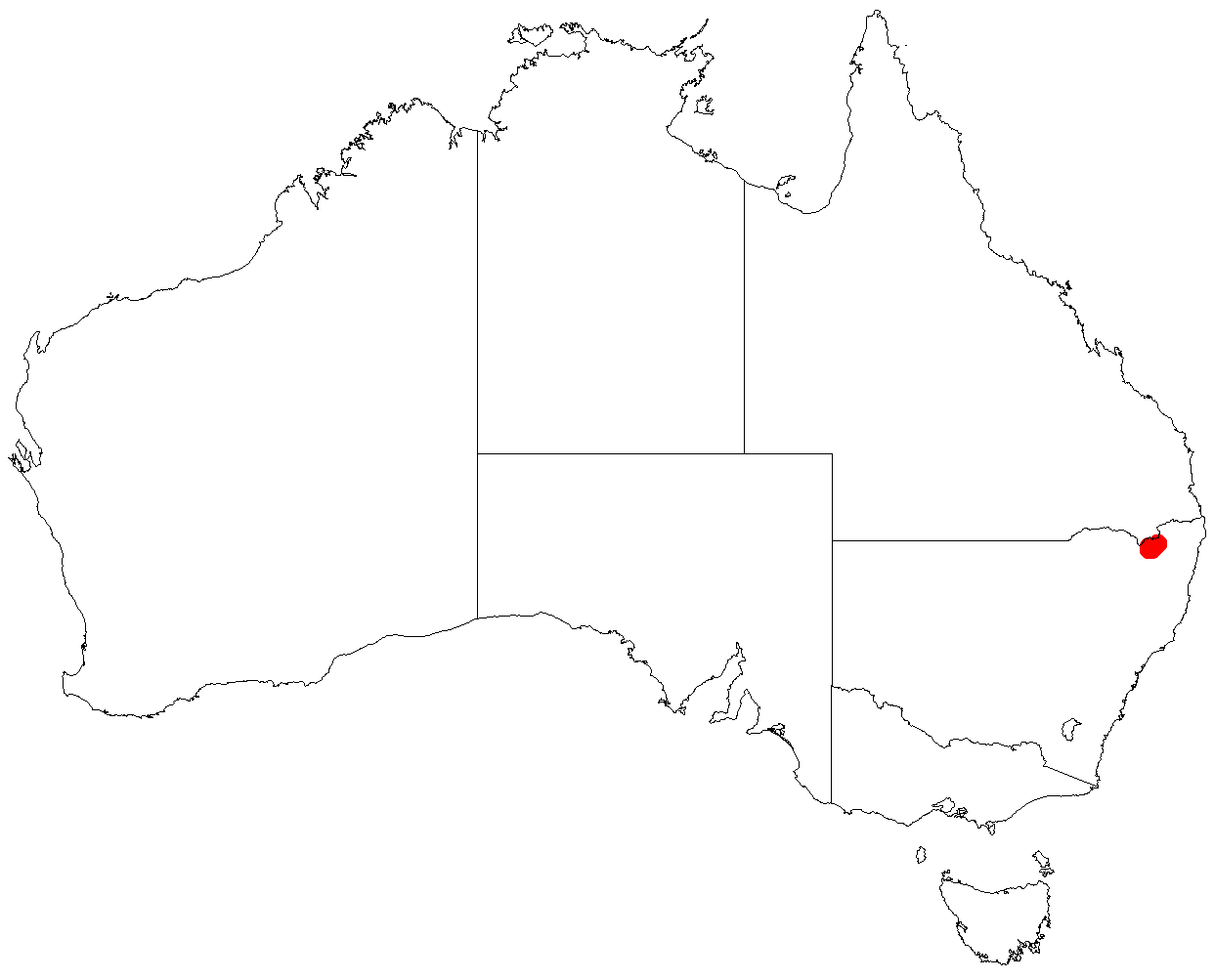
- Occurrence data from AVH

Species of flowering plant

Prostanthera staurophylla, commonly known as Tenterfield mint-bush, is a species of flowering plant in the family Lamiaceae and is endemic to a small area on the New England Tableland of New South Wales. It is an erect to spreading, strongly aromatic shrub with hairy branches, deeply lobed leaves and bluish-mauve flowers with darker markings.

== Description ==
Prostanthera staurophylla is an erect to spreading, strongly aromatic shrub that typically grows to a height of 1–1.8 m (3 ft 3 in – 5 ft 11 in) with branches covered with white hairs. The leaves are lime green to dark green, elliptic to oblong, trowel-shaped or cross-shaped with mostly three lobes, 2–9 mm (0.079–0.354 in) long and 0.9–7 mm (0.035–0.276 in) wide on a petiole 0.6–1.2 mm (0.024–0.047 in) long. The flowers are arranged singly in leaf axils, the sepals 3.4–4 mm (0.13–0.16 in) long forming a tube 2–2.5 mm (0.079–0.098 in) long with two broadly egg-shaped lobes. The petals are bluish mauve with darker markings, 15–18 mm (0.59–0.71 in) long forming a tube 8–10 mm (0.31–0.39 in) long, the central lower lobe 5–6 mm (0.20–0.24 in) long and the side lobes 3–4 mm (0.12–0.16 in) long, the upper lip 1–2 mm (0.039–0.079 in) long and 9–10 mm (0.35–0.39 in) wide. Flowering occurs from August to December.

== Taxonomy ==
Prostanthera staurophylla was first formally described in 1875 by Ferdinand von Mueller in Fragmenta Phytographiae Australiae from material collected between Tenterfield and the Severn River by Charles Stuart.

== Distribution and habitat ==
Tenterfield mint-bush is only known from near Tenterfield on the New England Tableland of New South Wales, where it grows in open and exposed places near granite outcrops with Kunzea and Leptospermum species. The discovery in 2001 by John T. Hunter and J.B. Williams of a specimen in the Mount Mackenzie Nature Reserve was the first record of the species in 130 years.

== Conservation status ==
Prostanthera staurophylla is classified as "vulnerable" under the Australian Government Environment Protection and Biodiversity Conservation Act 1999 and as "endangered" under the New South Wales Government Biodiversity Conservation Act 2016. The main threats to the species include its small population size, grazing, disturbance by pigs and goats, trampling and illegal collection of wildflowers.
