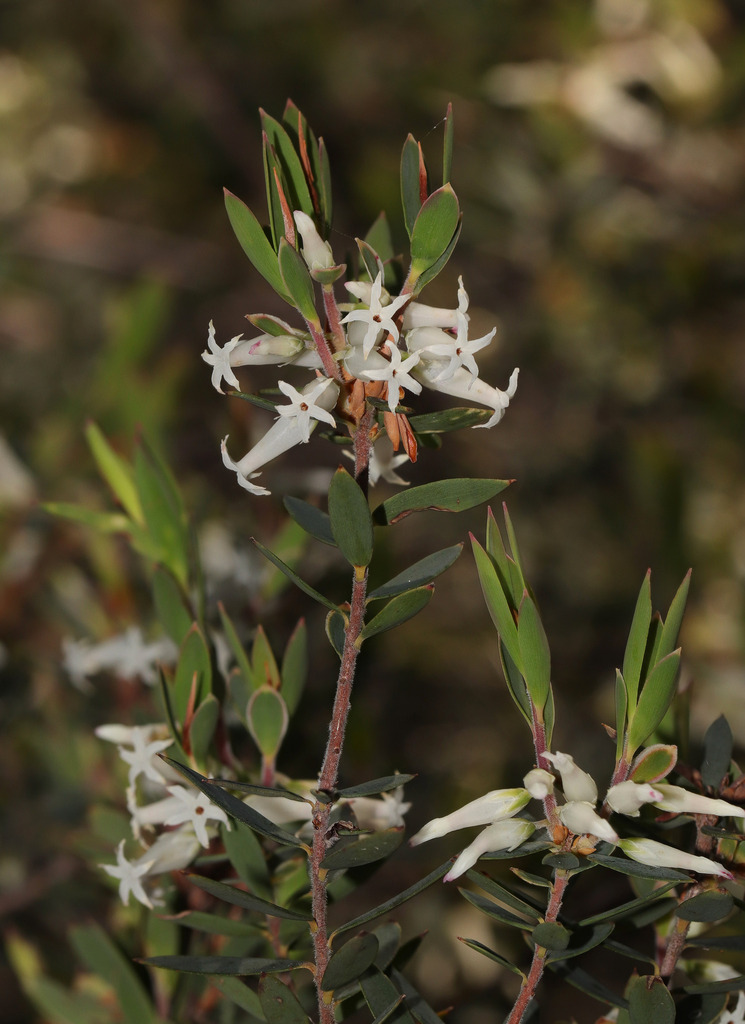

Scientific classification
- Kingdom: Plantae
- Clade: Tracheophytes
- Clade: Angiosperms
- Clade: Eudicots
- Clade: Asterids
- Order: Ericales
- Family: Ericaceae
- Genus: Brachyloma
- Species: B. saxicola

Binomial name
- Brachyloma saxicola John T. Hunter

Synonyms
- Brachyloma daphnoides var. latiusculum Blakely & McKie

= Brachyloma saxicola =

Species of flowering plant

Brachyloma saxicola is a species of flowering plant in the family Ericaceae and is endemic to the Northern Tablelands of New South Wales. It is a erect, bushy shrub with lance-shaped or narrowly elliptic leaves and white to cream-coloured, tube-shaped flowers.

== Description ==
Brachyloma saxicola is an erect, bushy shrub that typically grows to a height of about 4 m (13 ft). Its leaves are lance-shaped with the narrower end towards the base, or narrowly elliptic, 4–21.4 mm (0.16–0.84 in) long and 1.5–5 mm (0.059–0.197 in) wide on a petiole about 1 mm (0.039 in) long. The leaves are more or less glabrous and the lower surface is paler shade of green than the upper surface. The flowers are arranged towards the base of the current seasons growth with leaf-like bracts and bracteoles 2–3 mm (0.079–0.118 in) long at the base. The sepals are 3–4 mm (0.12–0.16 in) long and the petals are white to cream-coloured, and joined to form a tube 2–3 mm (0.079–0.118 in) long with lobes 1.5–2 mm (0.059–0.079 in) long. The fruit is a more or less spherical drupe 3–4 mm (0.12–0.16 in) long with ridges on the surface.

== Taxonomy ==
Brachyloma saxicola was first formally described in 1994 by John T. Hunter in the journal Telopea from specimens he collected near Backwater in northern New South Wales. The specific epithet (saxicola) means "stone- or rock-dweller".

== Distribution and habitat ==
This species grows in the upper parts of granite slopes and around granite boulders in a few areas on the Northern Tablelands of New South Wales.
