= Brachyloma delbi =

Conservation status
- Priority One — Poorly Known Taxa (DEC)

Scientific classification
- Kingdom: Plantae
- Clade: Tracheophytes
- Clade: Angiosperms
- Clade: Eudicots
- Clade: Asterids
- Order: Ericales
- Family: Ericaceae
- Genus: Brachyloma
- Species: B. delbi

Binomial name
- Brachyloma delbi Cranfield

Species of plant

Brachyloma delbi is a species of flowering plant in the family Ericaceae and is endemic to a small area in the south-west of Western Australia. It is an erect, open shrub with linear leaves and pink to red, tube-shaped flowers.

== Description ==
Brachyloma delbi is an erect, open shrub that usually grows to a height of 1.0–1.5 m (3 ft 3 in – 4 ft 11 in) and has sparsely hairy branchlets. The leaves are linear, 4.0–8.0 mm (0.16–0.31 in) long, and 0.75–1.0 mm (0.030–0.039 in) wide on a petiole 0.5–1 mm (0.020–0.039 in) long, with the edges rolled under and a small hard point on the tip. The flowers are arranged singly in leaf axils on a peduncle 0.75–1.0 mm (0.030–0.039 in) long with 2 sessile bracts 0.9–1.0 mm (0.035–0.039 in) long at the base. The sepals are egg-shaped, 1.5–2.0 mm (0.059–0.079 in) long and 1.0–1.5 mm (0.039–0.059 in) wide. The petals are joined to form an urn-shaped tube 3.0–4.5 mm (0.12–0.18 in) long with broadly triangular lobes about 1 mm (0.039 in) long. Flowering occurs from April to May and the fruit is a spherical drupe 3–4 mm (0.12–0.16 in) in diameter.

== Taxonomy and naming ==
Brachyloma delbi was first formally described in 2005 by Raymond Cranfield in the journal Nuytsia from specimens collected near Kulin in 1995. The specific epithet (delbi) is a Noongar word meaning "leaf", referring to the characteristic leaves of this species.

== Distribution ==
This species of shrub grows in open woodland and is only known from the type location in the Mallee bioregion of south-western Western Australia.

== Conservation status ==
Brachyloma delbi is listed as "Threatened" by the Western Australian Government Department of Biodiversity, Conservation and Attractions, meaning that it is in danger of extinction.
