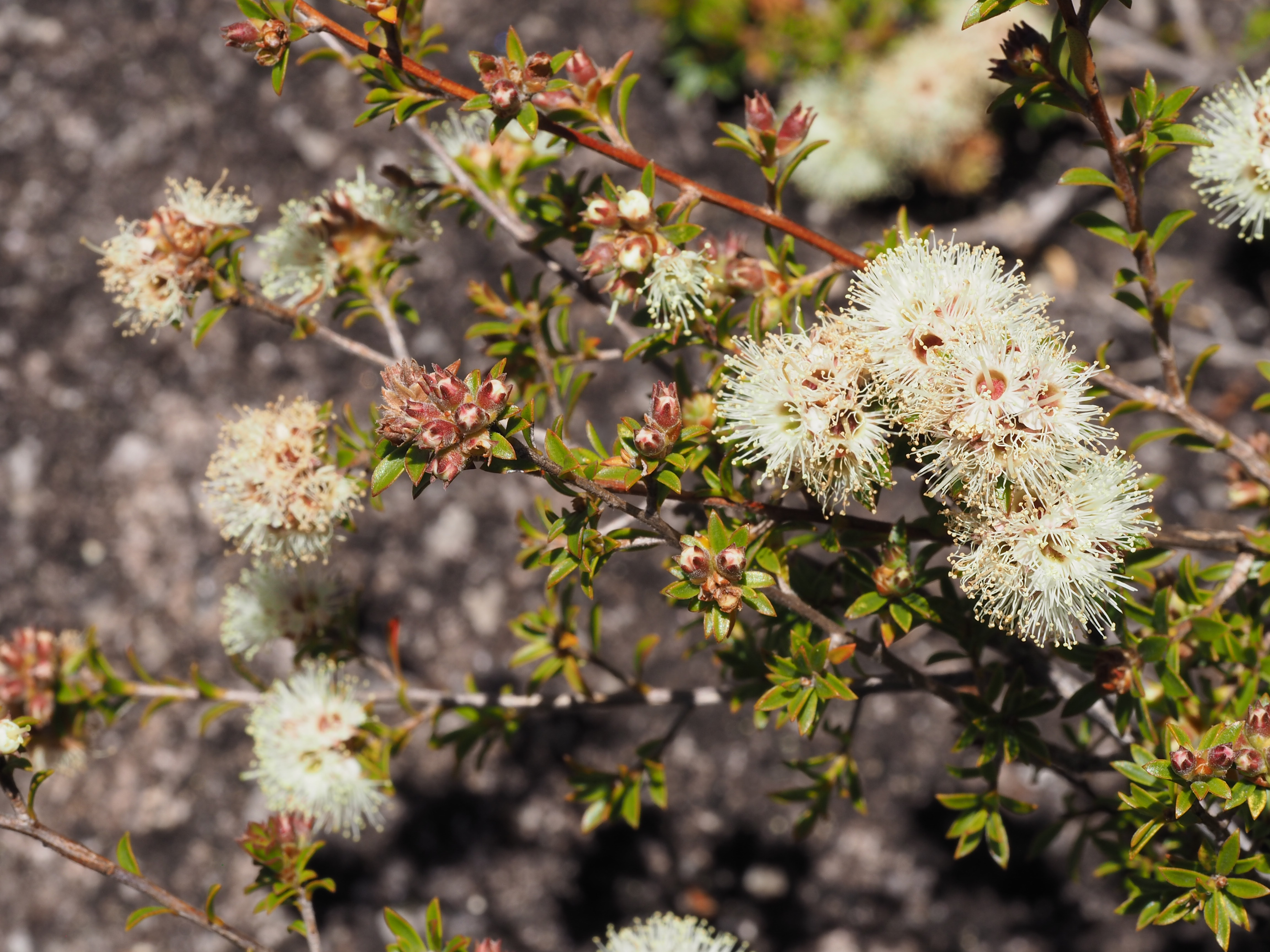
- Kunzea bracteolata leaves and flowers

Scientific classification
- Kingdom: Plantae
- Clade: Embryophytes
- Clade: Tracheophytes
- Clade: Spermatophytes
- Clade: Angiosperms
- Clade: Eudicots
- Clade: Rosids
- Order: Myrtales
- Family: Myrtaceae
- Genus: Kunzea
- Species: K. bracteolata

Binomial name
- Kunzea bracteolata Maiden & Betche

= Kunzea bracteolata =

Species of flowering plant

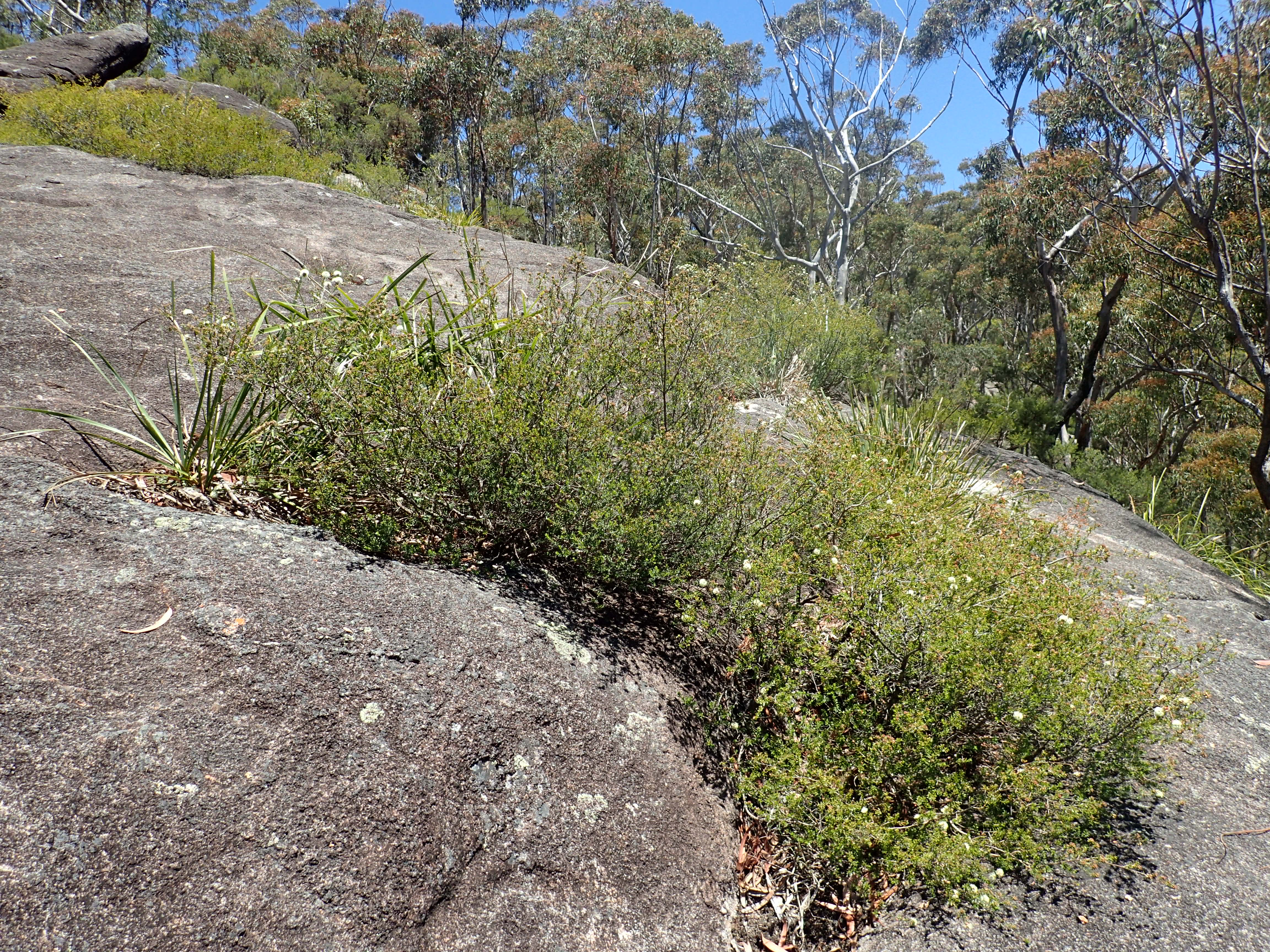
Habit in the Washpool National Park

Kunzea bracteolata is an Australian plant in the myrtle family found north of Glen Innes in northern New South Wales and in southern Queensland. It is a small shrub with spreading branches, small elliptic leaves and strongly scented white flowers on the ends of the branches in late spring.

== Description ==
Kunzea bracteolata is a shrub which grows to a height of about 1 m (3 ft) with branches up to 2 m (7 ft) long and hairy when young. The leaves are bright green and elliptic in shape, 4–9 mm (0.2–0.4 in) long, about 2 mm (0.08 in) wide on a stalk less than 1 mm (0.04 in) long. The leaves are covered with fine hairs when young and only the mid-vein is obvious. The flowers are white, have a strong honey-scent and are arranged in clusters on the ends of the branches. The sepals are triangular, about 2 mm (0.08 in) long and the petals are a similar length but the stamens are about twice as long. Flowering occurs from October to December and is followed by the fruit which is about 3 mm (0.1 in) long and wide.

== Taxonomy and naming ==
Kunzea bracteolata was first formally described in 1905 by Joseph Maiden and Ernst Betche and the description was published in Proceedings of the Linnean Society of New South Wales. The type specimen was collected in 1904 by John Boorman, who collected widely for the Sydney Botanic Gardens. The specific epithet (bracteolata) is a Latin word meaning "overlaid with scales".

== Distribution and habitat ==
This kunzea grows in forest on granite in scattered populations north from Glen Innes to southern Queensland. There is a large population in the Gibraltar Range National Park.

== Use in horticulture ==
Kunzea bracteolata has profuse, conspicuous, scented white flowers which are visited by many insects. The plant can be propagated from cuttings, is frost tolerant and drought tolerant when established but benefits from being pruned to maintain its shape.
