= Torrington, New South Wales =

Torrington
- Town
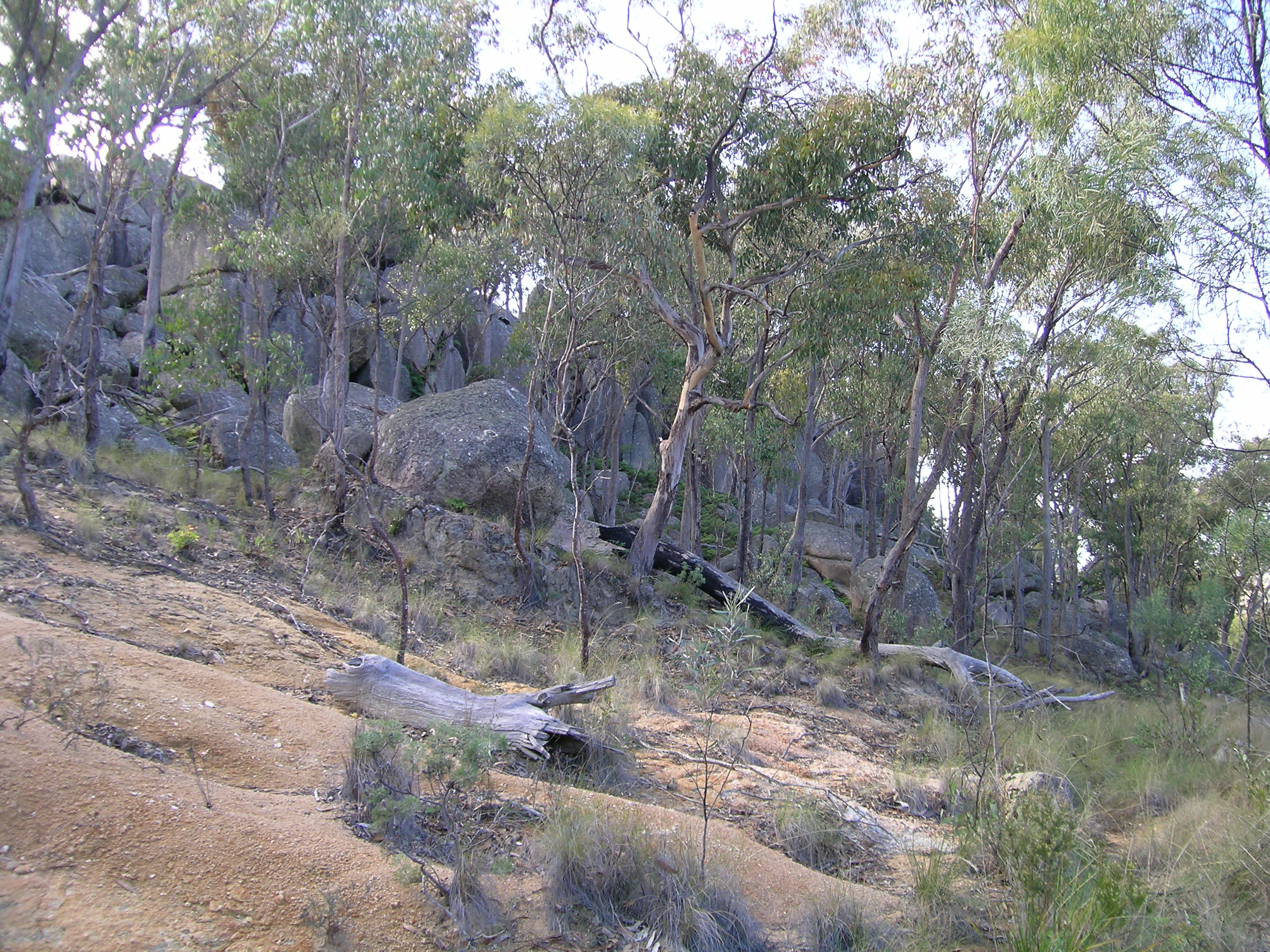
- Torrington State Recreation Area

- Coordinates: 29°18′57″S 151°42′02″E
- Country: Australia
- State: New South Wales
- LGA: Tenterfield Shire
- Location: 668 km (415 mi) N of Sydney; 159 km (99 mi) N of Armidale; 61 km (38 mi) N of Glen Innes

Government
  - State electorate: Lismore
  - Federal division: New England
- Elevation: 1,129 m (3,704 ft)

Population
  - Total: 77 (SAL 2021)
- Postcode: 2371
- County: Clive County
- Parish: Annandale

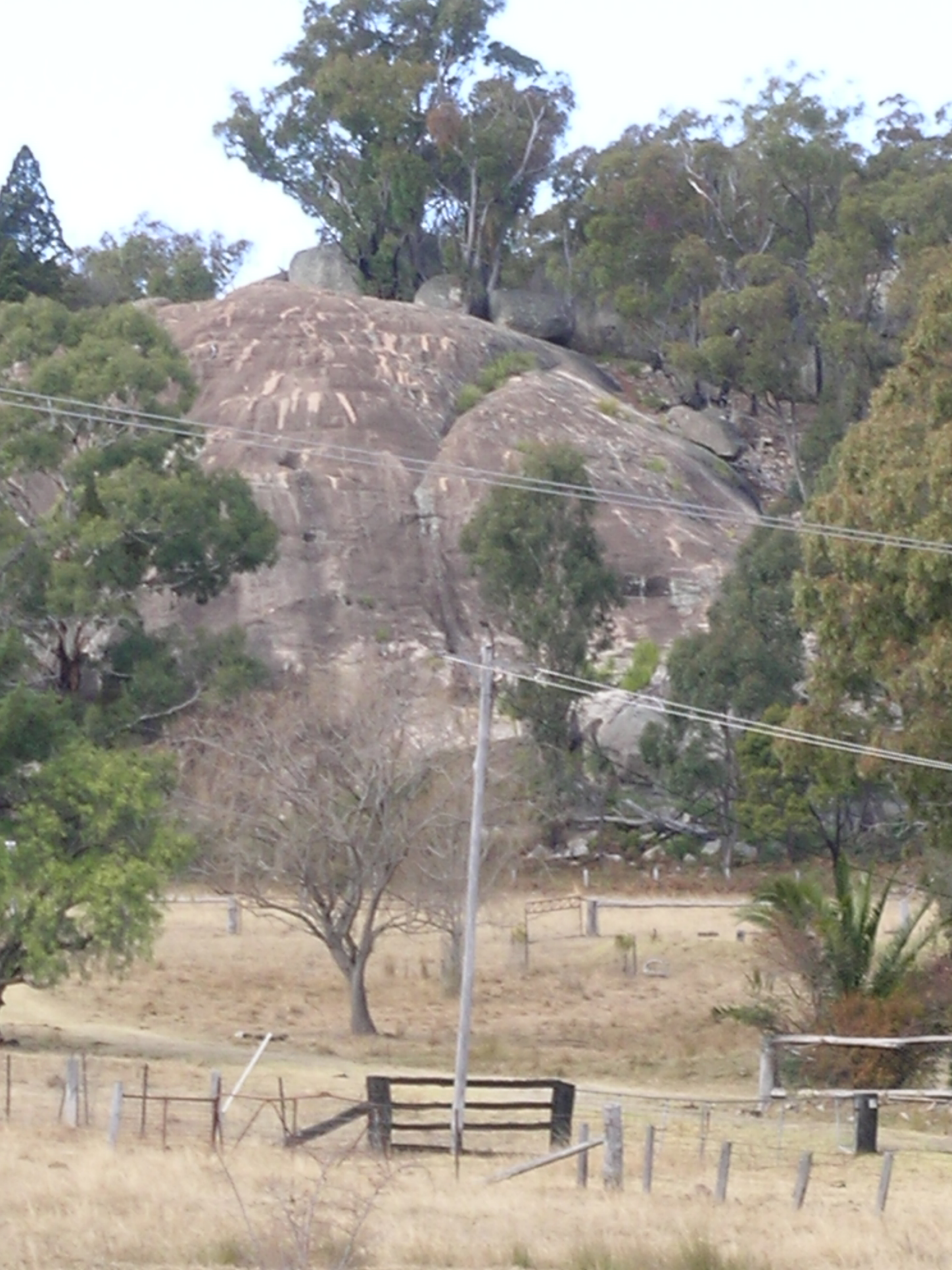
Goat Rock, Torrington

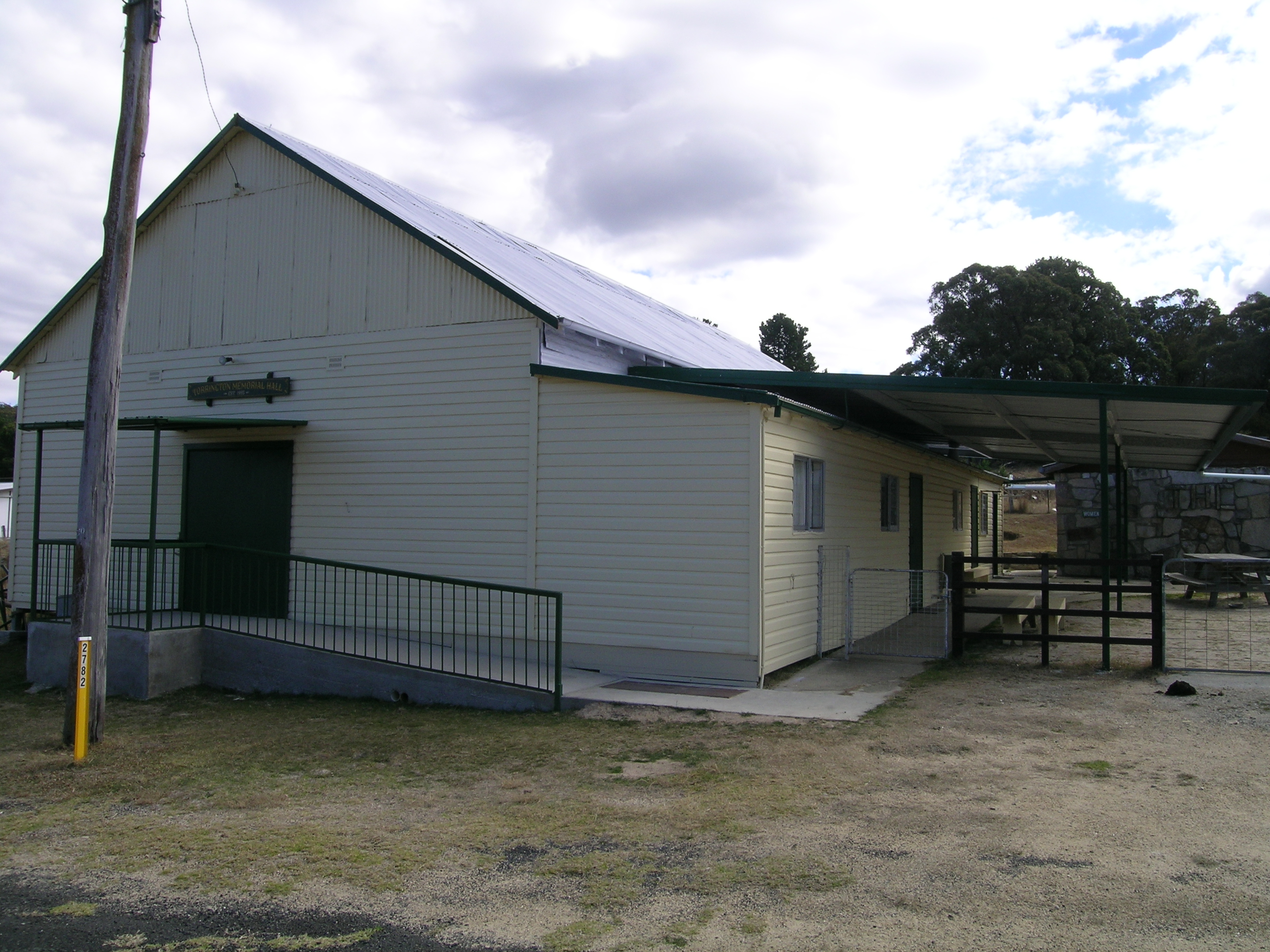
Torrington Memorial Hall

Torrington (formerly Torington) is a small village in northern New South Wales in Tenterfield Shire. It is 29 kilometres north west of Deepwater and south west of Tenterfield and 61 kilometres from Glen Innes (South-East). It is situated on a plateau known as the Mole Tableland in close proximity to the Queensland border on the Northern Tablelands. A feature of Torrington is its abundance of boulders and rocky outcrops. The most notable boulder outcrop located in the village being "Goat Rock" and just out of town is "Old Mystery Face"

== History ==
Torrington was named after its English counterpart in Devon. The discovery of the extremely rich Torrington tin lode in 1881 created much excitement but in a very short time the small prospectors had lost control to overseas mining companies, the precursors of today's multi-nationals. In the 1920s, 500 men were employed at the mines. There were sixteen batteries working, and the community enjoyed the convenience of five general stores, butcher shop, cafes, bakery, billiard rooms, police station, post office, churches, hotel and many sporting facilities in Torrington and the two now defunct satellite villages of Tungsten and Bismuth which were both approximately 7 kilometres north and west of Torrington respectively. Today, there is scarcely any indication that either of the satellite villages ever existed.

The Mole Post Office opened on 1 August 1882 and was renamed Torington in 1883 and Torrington in 1970. Bismuth Post Office was open between 1912 and 1931.

Torrington Public School Headmaster in 1934 was Mr. A. J. McMullen. At his farewell dinner, the people of the town spoke of his sporting leadership in leading the school hockey team, and his musical talent. He had transferred to The Entrance in 1934.

The first rural land release for grazing occurred in 1931 when a block of 1,068 acres (432 ha) north of Torrington was granted by the New South Wales Department of Lands. This was followed by the general granting of further lands both north, south and west of Torrington over the next 50 years, for grazing purposes, but primarily most of the Torrington district remains in its natural state. When the government ended its tin subsidy after World War II the mining industry virtually shut down. Torrington also had a saw mill which used stringybark trees taken from the surrounding heavily timbered pendant but this mill closed in the 1960s. There is still a small timber mill operating not far from Torrington on the Deepwater Road which produces hardwood timber to order. There is still intermittent commercial mining dependent upon the current prices for tin. The area has large deposits of massive topaz (silexite) which is of interest to the mining industry and to fossickers.

In 1981 Torrington celebrated its centenary, and was officially classified as a village. There was a hotel in Torrington, but it shut down in January 1999 when the licence was to be transferred to Sydney for the Olympic Games, but with objections to the Liquor Board the hotel was re-opened in December 2000 with a restaurant licence and the original licence was allowed to be transferred to Sydney. However, there was difficulty with the holding company of the freehold and the pub was permanently closed in October 2003. A Cornish Buddle and Five-Head Stamper which are relics of the old mining days can be seen at the caravan park. The population of Torrington is approximately 85 people.

== Droughts ==
The average rainfall over the ten years to 2000 was 39.23 inches (996 mm). After the short sharp drought of 1982–83, in the twenty-two-year period 1983 to 2005 there were many short droughts. For instance in October 1991 all northern New South Wales and southern Queensland were in extreme drought conditions. Again in 1994 a bad drought continued until January 1996, but worse was to come. In 2002 Torrington received 24 inches (610 mm) and again in 2005 it had 30 inches (760 mm) for the year. This drought broke in 2006.

== Fossicking and tourism ==
Mining has given way to fossicking and tourism and now visitors enjoy the spectacular scenery of rocky granite outcrops, steep gorges, gently flowing streams as well as fossicking for topaz, quartz and the many minerals found in the area. Unfortunately the last general store and the caravan park were closed some years ago.

Torrington State Recreation Area has more than 30,000 ha of wildlife featuring the famous Old Mystery Face, Captain Thunderbolt's Lookout and many other spectacular rock formations, streams and waterfalls. The Reserve is recognized as being of State significance for conservation, mining, honey production, recreation and cultural heritage. The rare shrub Persoonia terminalis and the endangered plant, Torrington Pea (Almaleea cambagei) can be found in this area.

== Media ==
Local news coverage is provided by Glen Innes News which publishes in print as well as online.
