= Astroloma =

Genus of flowering plants

Astroloma is a historically recognised genus of about 25 species of flowering plants in the family Ericaceae and endemic to Australia.

The genus was first described in 1810 by Robert Brown in his Prodromus Florae Novae Hollandiae.

Plants of the World Online considers Astroloma to be a synonym of Styphelia. As of September 2023, all the species in the list below are now considered to be included in Styphelia or in some cases, in Stenanthera or Brachyloma.

The name Astroloma is derived from the Ancient Greek words astron = a star and loma = a fringe, alluding to five tufts of hairs which form a star at the bottom of the inside of the floral tube.

The following is a list of species formerly included in Astroloma:

- Astroloma acervatum Hislop & A.J.G.Wilson (now Styphelia acervata)
- Astroloma baxteri A.Cunn. ex DC. (now Brachyloma baxteri)
- Astroloma chloranthum Hislop & A.J.G.Wilson (now Styphelia chlorantha)
- Astroloma ciliatum (Lindl.) Druce (now Styphelia discolor)
- Astroloma compactum R.Br. (now Styphelia compacta)
- Astroloma conostephioides (Sond.) F.Muell. ex Benth. - flame heath (now Stenanthera conostephioides)
- Astroloma drummondii Sond. (now Styphelia epacridis)
- Astroloma epacridis (DC.) Druce (now Styphelia epacridis)
- Astroloma foliosum Sond. - candle cranberry (now Styphelia foliosa)
- Astroloma glaucescens Sond. (now Styphelia tortifolia)
- Astroloma humifusum (Cav.) R.Br. - cranberry heath (now Styphelia humifusa)
- Astroloma inopinatum Hislop (now Styphelia inopinata)
- Astroloma macrocalyx Sond. (now Styphelia macrocalyx)
- Astroloma microcalyx Sond. – native cranberry (now Styphelia microcalyx)
- Astroloma microdonta Benth. (now Styphelia microdonta)
- Astroloma microphyllum Stschegl. (now Styphelia pentapogona)
- Astroloma oblongifolium A.J.G.Wilson & Hislop (now Styphelia oblongifolia)
- Astroloma pallidum R.Br. (now Styphelia pallida)
- Astroloma pinifolium (R.Br.) Benth. - pine heath (now Stenanthera pinifolia)
- Astroloma prostratum (now Styphelia prostrata)
- Astroloma serratifolium (DC.) Sond. (now Styphelia serratifolia)
- Astroloma stomarrhena Sond. (now Styphelia stomarrhena)
- Astroloma tectum R.Br. (now Styphelia tecta)
- Astroloma xerophyllum (DC.) Sond. (now Styphelia xerophylla)
