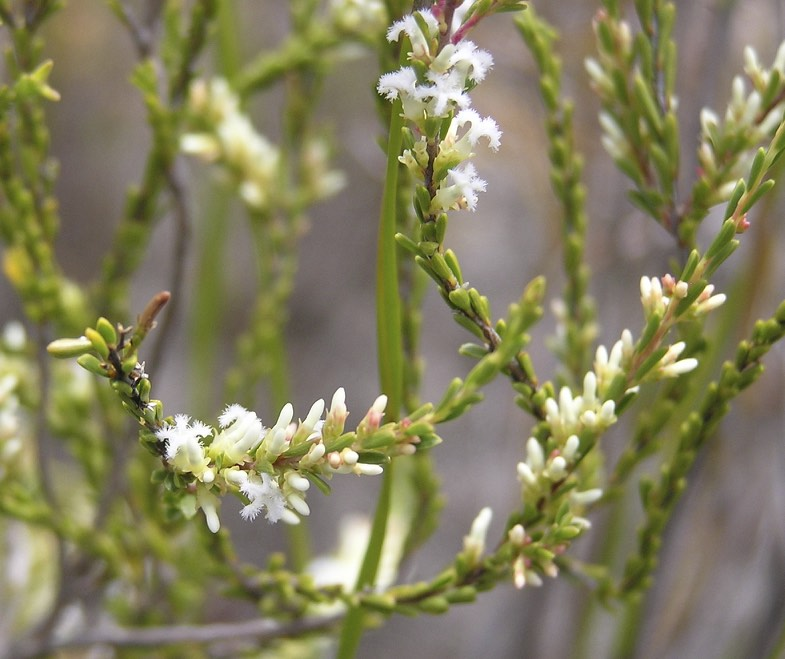

Scientific classification
- Kingdom: Plantae
- Clade: Tracheophytes
- Clade: Angiosperms
- Clade: Eudicots
- Clade: Asterids
- Order: Ericales
- Family: Ericaceae
- Genus: Styphelia
- Species: S. corynocarpa

Binomial name
- Styphelia corynocarpa (Sond.) F.Muell.
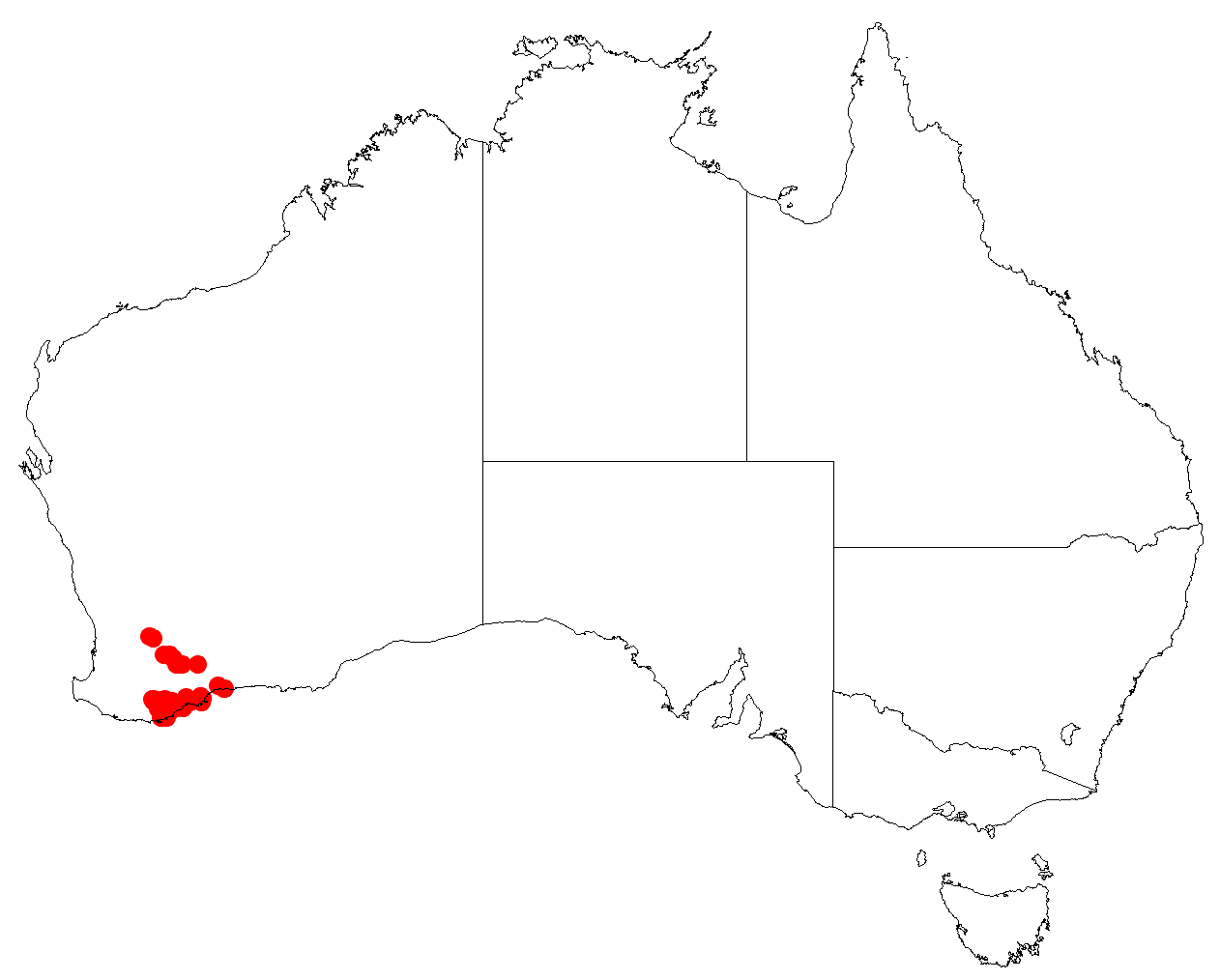
- Occurrence data from AVH

Synonyms
- Leucopogon corynocarpus Sond.

= Styphelia corynocarpa =

Species of shrub

Styphelia corynocarpus is a flowering plant in the family Ericaceae and is endemic to the south-west of Western Australia. It is an erect, open shrub with narrowly egg-shaped to narrowly elliptic leaves, and white flowers arranged in groups of up to five in leaf axils.

== Description ==
Styphelia corynocarpus is an erect, open shrub that typically grows up to about 150 cm (59 in) high and 80 cm (31 in) wide, its young branchlets sometimes covered with short hairs. The leaves are directed upwards, narrowly egg-shaped with the narrower end towards the base or narrowly elliptic, 4–13 mm (0.16–0.51 in) long and 1.0–2.2 mm (0.039–0.087 in) long. The leaves are mostly glabrous and the lower surface has 3 to 5 prominent veins. The flowers are arranged in groups of up to five in leaf axils, on a peduncle 2–8 mm (0.079–0.315 in) long. There are egg-shaped bracts 0.7–1.2 mm (0.028–0.047 in) long and similar bracteoles 1.2–1.5 mm (0.047–0.059 in) long at the base. The sepals are egg-shaped to narrowly egg-shaped, 2.3–3.0 mm (0.091–0.118 in) long and the petals are white, joined at the base to form a tube 1.4–1.8 mm (0.055–0.071 in) long with lobes 2.2–2.8 mm (0.087–0.110 in) long.

== Taxonomy ==
This species was first formally described in 1845 by Otto Wilhelm Sonder who gave it the name Leucopogon corynocarpua in Johann Georg Christian Lehmann's Plantae Preissianae. In 1882, Ferdinand von Mueller transferred the species to Styphelia as S. corynocarpa in the Systematic Census of Australian Plants. The specific epithet (corynocarpa) means "club-fruited".

== Distribution ==
This styphelia grows in heath or open mallee woodland from the western end of the Stirling Ranges to the western end of the Fitzgerald River National Park in the Avon Wheatbelt, Esperance Plains and Jarrah Forest bioregions of south-western Western Australia.
