= Styphelia breviflora =

Scientific classification
- Kingdom: Plantae
- Clade: Tracheophytes
- Clade: Angiosperms
- Clade: Eudicots
- Clade: Asterids
- Order: Ericales
- Family: Ericaceae
- Genus: Styphelia
- Species: S. breviflora

Binomial name
- Styphelia breviflora (F.Muell.) F.Muell.
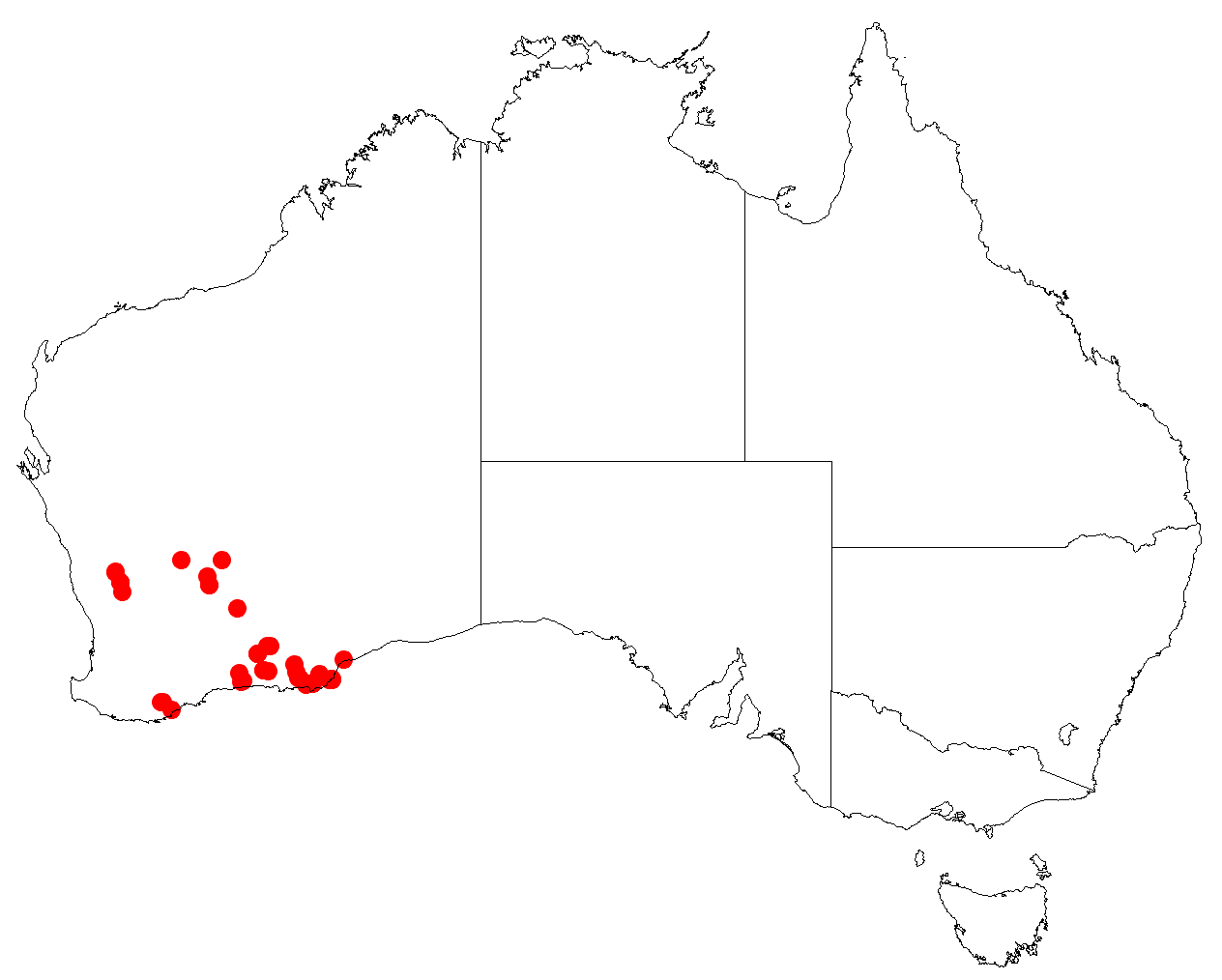
- Occurrence data from AVH

Synonyms
- Leucopogon breviflorus F.Muell.

Species of plant

Styphelia breviflora is a species of flowering plant in the heath family Ericaceae and is endemic to the south-west of Western Australia. It is an erect, spindly, glabrous shrub that typically grows to a height of up to about 1.5 m (4 ft 11 in). It has oblong to lance-shaped or linear leaves 4–9 mm (0.16–0.35 in) long on a short petiole and with a small, rigid point on the tip. The flowers are borne singly or in pairs in leaf axils on a short peduncle with small bracts and bracteoles about half as long as the sepals. The sepals are about 2 mm (0.079 in) long and the petals white and about 4 mm (0.16 in) long, the petal lobes longer than the petal tube.

It was first formally described in 1864 by Ferdinand von Mueller in Fragmenta Phytographiae Australiae from specimens collected by George Maxwell near Israelite Bay. In 1882, von Mueller transferred the species to Styphelia as S. breviflora in the Systematic Census of Australian Plants. The specific epithet (breviflora) means "short-flowered".

This styphelia occurs in the Esperance Plains and Mallee bioregions of south-western Western Australia and is listed as "not threatened" by the Western Australian Government Department of Biodiversity, Conservation and Attractions.
