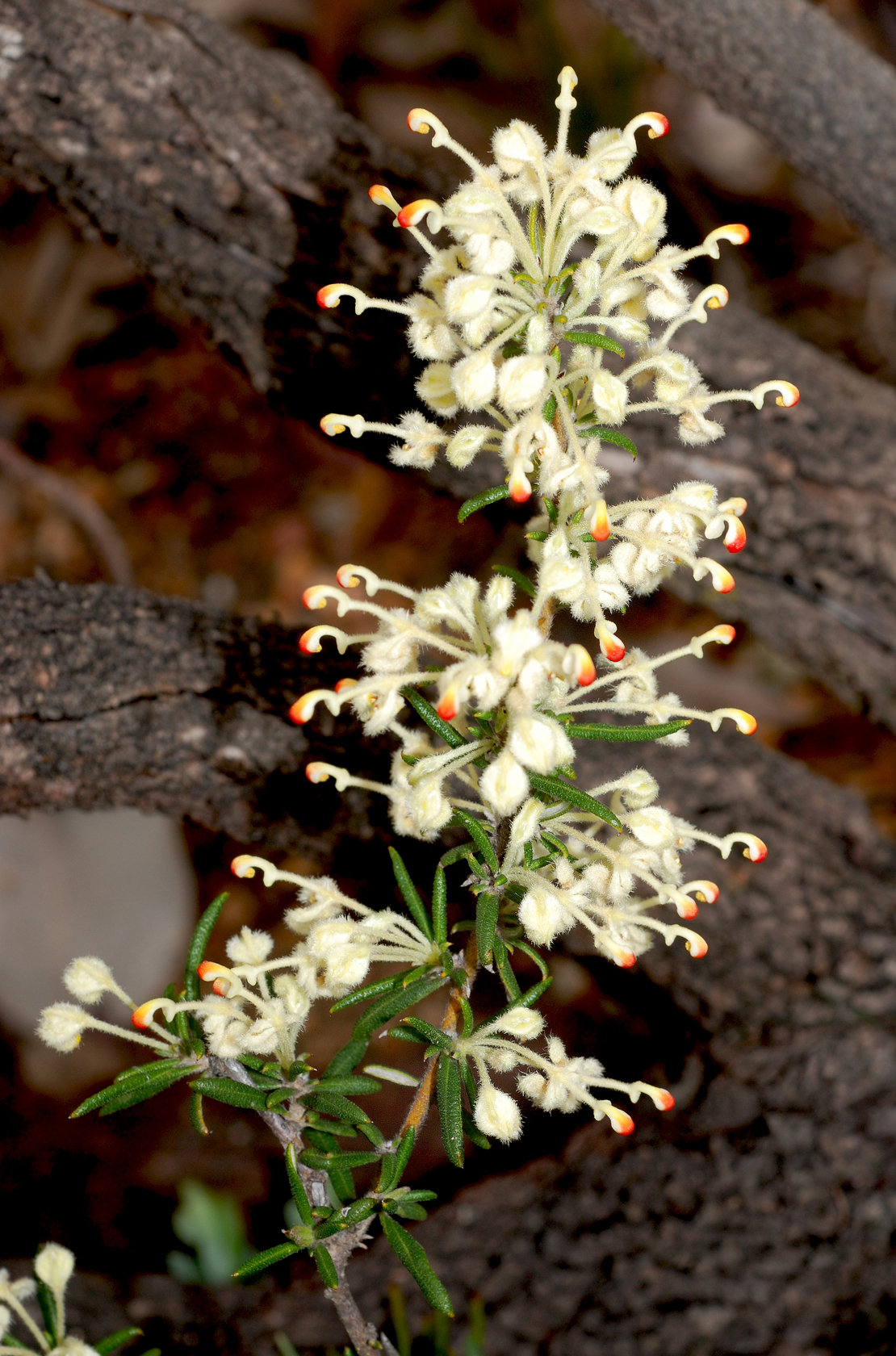

Scientific classification
- Kingdom: Plantae
- Clade: Tracheophytes
- Clade: Angiosperms
- Clade: Eudicots
- Order: Proteales
- Family: Proteaceae
- Genus: Grevillea
- Species: G. scabra

Binomial name
- Grevillea scabra Meisn.

= Grevillea scabra =

Rough leaved grevillea

Species of shrub endemic to Western Australia

Grevillea scabra, commonly known as the rough-leaved grevillea, is a species of flowering plant in the family Proteaceae and is endemic to the south-west of Western Australia. It is a low, open shrub with clusters of narrowly elliptic to more or less linear leaves and small clusters of white to cream-coloured flowers.

== Description ==
Grevillea scabra is an open shrub that typically grows to a height of up to about 30 cm (12 in) and has erect branches. Its leaves are narrowly elliptic to more or less linear, 5–35 mm (0.20–1.38 in) long, 1–6 mm (0.039–0.236 in) wide and clustered on short side branches. The upper surface of the leaves is glabrous and the edges are rolled under obscuring most of the lower surface. The flowers are arranged in clusters of 2 to 6 on the ends of the short side branches and are white to cream-coloured, the end of the style yellow, ageing to reddish, the pistil 8–13.5 mm (0.31–0.53 in) long. The style has a conspicuous appendage that is C-shaped in side view. Flowering occurs in September and October, and the fruit is an oblong follicle 10–13 mm (0.39–0.51 in) long.

== Taxonomy ==
Grevillea scabra was first formally described by the botanist Carl Meissner in 1845 in Lehmann's Plantae Preissianae from specimens collected by James Drummond in the Swan River Colony. The specific epithet (scabra) means "rough", referring to the surface of the leaves.

== Distribution ==
Rough-leaved grevillea grows in open forest or woodland, usually in soils containing laterite and is found in the area between York, Bolgart and Goomalling in the Avon Wheatbelt and Jarrah Forest bioregions of south-western Western Australia.

== See also ==
- List of Grevillea species
