= Hibbertia helianthemoides =

Scientific classification
- Kingdom: Plantae
- Clade: Tracheophytes
- Clade: Angiosperms
- Clade: Eudicots
- Order: Dilleniales
- Family: Dilleniaceae
- Genus: Hibbertia
- Species: H. helianthemoides

Binomial name
- Hibbertia helianthemoides (Turcz.) F.Muell.

Synonyms
- Candollea helianthemoides Turcz.

Species of flowering plant

Hibbertia helianthemoides is a species of flowering plant in the family Dilleniaceae and is endemic to a small area in the south-west of Western Australia. It is a prostrate to low-lying, spreading to erect, hairy shrub with hairy foliage, linear leaves and yellow flowers with thirteen stamens.

== Description ==
Hibbertia helianthemoides is a prostrate to low-lying, spreading to erect shrub that typically grows to a height of up to 30 cm (12 in), its foliage covered with soft, curled hairs. The leaves are densely clustered on short side-shoots, linear, 5–15 mm (0.20–0.59 in) long and 0.7–2 mm (0.028–0.079 in) wide with the edges turned down or rolled under. The flowers are usually arranged singly or in small groups on the ends of short side-shoots and are 9–13 mm (0.35–0.51 in) in diameter. There are up to three inconspicuous, thin, egg-shaped to elliptic bracts 0.5–3 mm (0.020–0.118 in) long. The five sepals are joined at the base, 3–5.5 mm (0.12–0.22 in) long and 1.5–3 mm (0.059–0.118 in) wide. The five petals are yellow, egg-shaped with the narrower end towards the base, 5–8 mm (0.20–0.31 in) long and there are thirteen stamens in groups around the three glabrous carpels each with a single ovule. Flowering has been recorded from July to September.

== Taxonomy ==
This species was first formally described in 1849 by Nikolai Turczaninow who gave it the name Candollea helianthemoides in the Bulletin de la Société Impériale des Naturalistes de Moscou from specimens collected by James Drummond. In 1882, Ferdinand von Mueller changed the name to Hibbertia helianthemoides in Systematic Census of Australian Plants. The specific epithet (helianthemoides) means "Helianthemum-like".

== Distribution and habitat ==
Hibbertia helianthemoides grows in woodland and shrubland from near Tenterden to the Stirling Ranges in the south-west of Western Australia.

== Conservation status ==
Hibbertia helianthemoides is classified as "Priority Four" by the Government of Western Australia Department of Parks and Wildlife, meaning that is rare or near threatened.

== See also ==
- List of Hibbertia species
