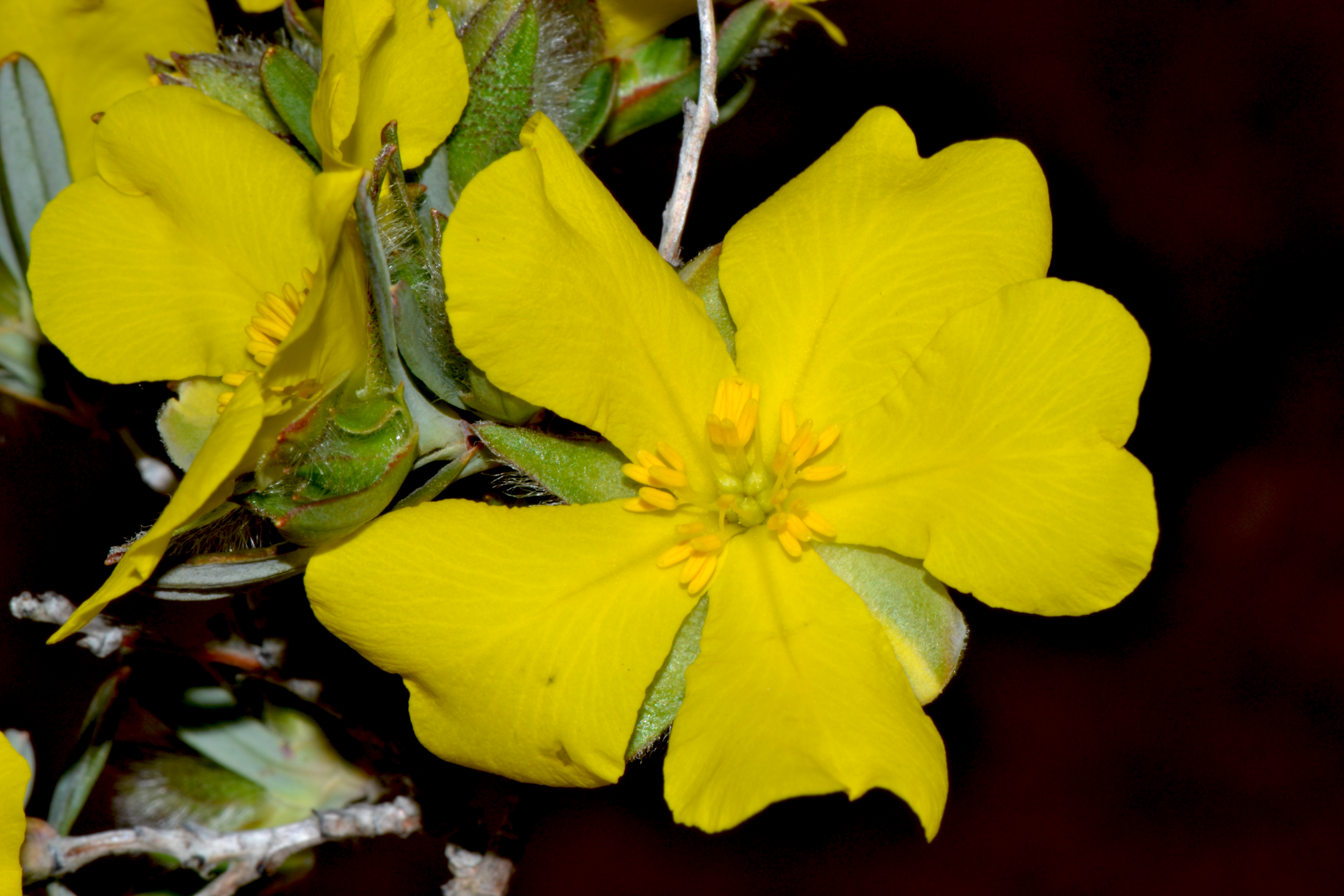
- East of Mullewa

Scientific classification
- Kingdom: Plantae
- Clade: Tracheophytes
- Clade: Angiosperms
- Clade: Eudicots
- Order: Dilleniales
- Family: Dilleniaceae
- Genus: Hibbertia
- Species: H. glomerosa

Binomial name
- Hibbertia glomerosa (Benth.) F.Muell.

Synonyms
- Candollea glomerosa Benth. p.p.; Hibbertia benthamii F.Muell. nom. illeg. p.p.; Hibbertia polyclada Diels

= Hibbertia glomerosa =

Species of flowering plant

Hibbertia glomerosa is a species of flowering plant in the family Dilleniaceae and is endemic to the south-west of Western Australia. It is a shrub with linear to narrow oblong leaves and bright yellow flowers borne on the ends of short side shoots, with twenty-five to thirty-eight stamens arranged in groups of five around the five glabrous carpels.

== Description ==
Hibbertia glomerosa is a shrub that typically grows to a height of 0.6–1.0 m (2 ft 0 in – 3 ft 3 in), the branchlets with leaf scars. The leaves are linear to narrow oblong, 7–25 mm (0.28–0.98 in) long, 1–3 mm (0.039–0.118 in) wide. The flowers are arranged singly or in small groups, on short side-shoots and are 10–25 mm (0.39–0.98 in) wide with up to three bracts 4–12 mm (0.16–0.47 in) long at the base of the flower. The five sepals are joined at the base, egg-shaped to elliptic and 6–12 mm (0.24–0.47 in) long. The five petals are bright yellow, egg-shaped with the narrower end towards the base and 7–14 mm (0.28–0.55 in) long with a notch at the tip. There are 25 to 38 stamens arranged in five groups of four to eight, arranged around the five spherical, glabrous carpels, each carpel containing one ovule.

== Taxonomy ==
This species was first formally described in 1863 by George Bentham who gave it the name Candolleana glomerosa in Flora Australiensis from specimens collected by Augustus Oldfield from Port Gregory. In 1882, Ferdinand von Mueller changed the name to Hibbertia glomerosa in the Systematic Census of Australian Plants. The specific epithet (glomerosa) means "abounding in balls of yarn", referring to the groups of flowers.

== Distribution and habitat ==
Hibbertia glomerosa grows in shrubland, heath and mallee and is widespread inland areas of south-western Western Australia.

== Conservation status ==
Hibbertia glomerosa is classified as "not threatened" by the Government of Western Australia Department of Parks and Wildlife.

== See also ==
- List of Hibbertia species
