= Styphelia leptantha =

Scientific classification
- Kingdom: Plantae
- Clade: Tracheophytes
- Clade: Angiosperms
- Clade: Eudicots
- Clade: Asterids
- Order: Ericales
- Family: Ericaceae
- Genus: Styphelia
- Species: S. leptantha

Binomial name
- Styphelia leptantha (Benth.) F.Muell.
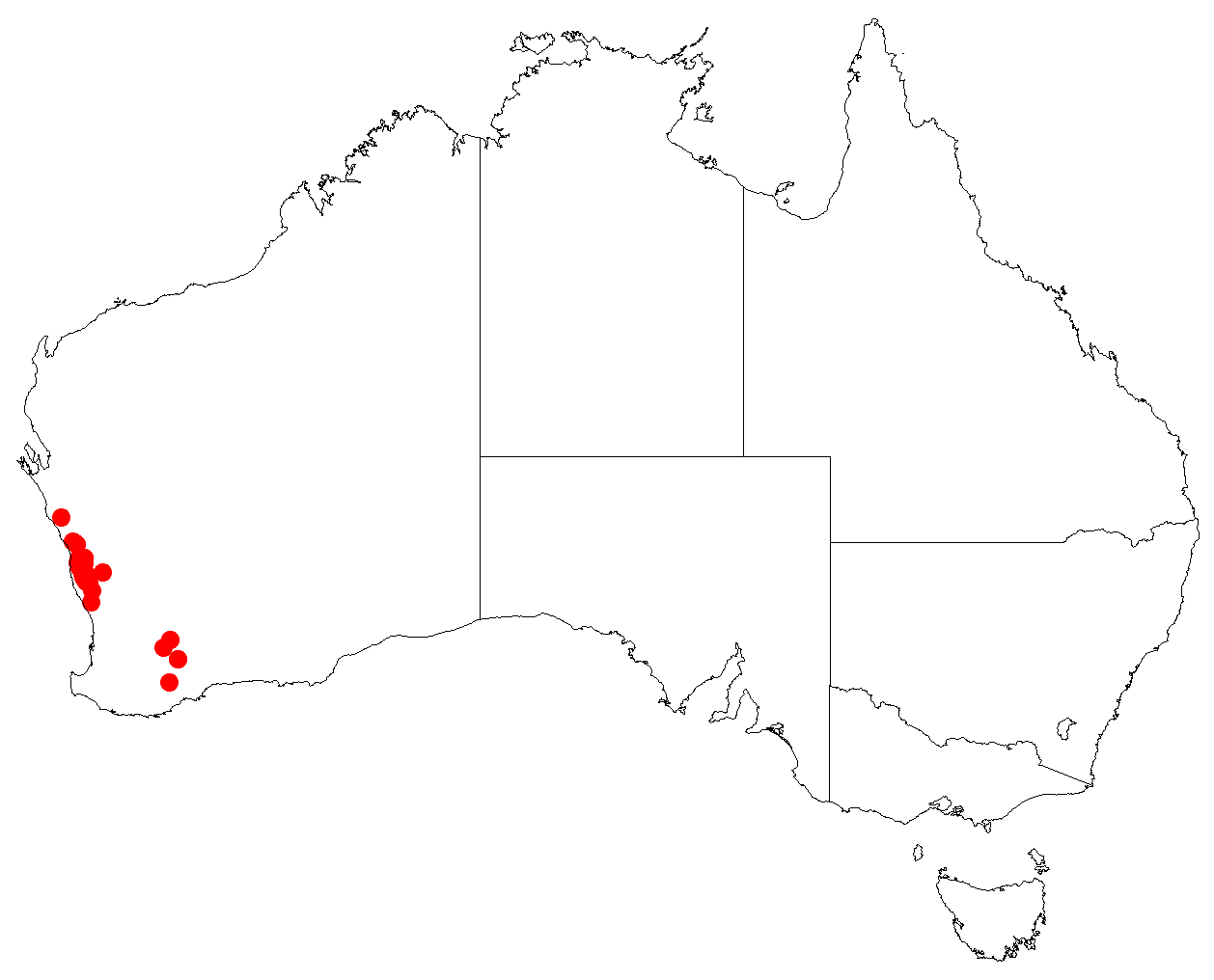
- Occurrence data from AVH

Synonyms
- Leucopogon leptanthus Benth.

Species of plant

Styphelia leptantha is a species of flowering plant in the heath family Ericaceae and is endemic to the south-west of Western Australia. It is an erect, bushy shrub that typically grows to a height of about 30 cm (12 in). Its leaves are erect, oblong or egg-shaped and 4–6 mm (0.16–0.24 in) long with a small, hard point on the tip. The flowers are arranged singly or in pairs in leaf axils with small bracts and bracteoles less than half as long as the sepals. The sepals are about 1.6 mm (0.063 in) long, the petals joined at the base to form a tube about 4 mm (0.16 in) long with lobes about 2 mm (0.079 in) long.

The species was first formally described in 1868 by George Bentham in Flora Australiensis who gave it the name Leucopogon leptanthus from specimens collected by James Drummond between the Moore and Murchison Rivers. In 1882, Ferdinand von Mueller transferred the species to the genus Styphelia as S. leptantha in his Systematic Census of Australian Plants. The specific epithet (leptantha) means "slender-flowered".

Styphelia leptantha occurs in the Geraldton Sandplains and Swan Coastal Plain bioregions of south-western Western Australia and is listed as "not threatened" by the Government of Western Australia Department of Biodiversity, Conservation and Attractions.
