= Styphelia conferta =

Conservation status
- Endangered (EPBC Act)

Scientific classification
- Kingdom: Plantae
- Clade: Tracheophytes
- Clade: Angiosperms
- Clade: Eudicots
- Clade: Asterids
- Order: Ericales
- Family: Ericaceae
- Genus: Styphelia
- Species: S. conferta

Binomial name
- Styphelia conferta (Benth.)F.Muell.

Synonyms
- Leucopogon confertus Benth.

Species of plant

Styphelia confertus, commonly known as Torrington beard-heath, is a species of flowering plant in the heath family Ericaceae and is endemic to a restricted part of New South Wales. It is a small shrub with erect, oblong or lance-shaped leaves, and white, tube-shaped flowers, the petals with shaggy hairs.

== Description ==
Styphelia conferta is a small shrub with softly-hairy branchlets. Its leaves are erect, oblong to lance-shaped, 5.0–7.5 mm (0.20–0.30 in) long and 0.8–1.4 mm (0.031–0.055 in) wide on a petiole less than 0.5 mm (0.020 in) long. Both sides of the leaves are covered with bristly hairs. The flowers are arranged singly in leaf axils and are erect with bracteoles 2.3–3.0 mm (0.091–0.118 in) long at the base. The sepals are shaggy-hairy, 3.4–4.0 mm (0.13–0.16 in) long, the petals white and joined at the base to form a tube 1.9–2.2 mm (0.075–0.087 in) long, the lobes 2.2–2.5 mm (0.087–0.098 in) long and shaggy-hairy on the inside.

== Taxonomy ==
This species was first formally described in 1868 by George Bentham in who gave it the name Leucopogon confertus in Flora Australiensis from specimens collected by Charles Stuart. In 1882, Ferdinand von Mueller transferred the species to Styphelia as S. conferta in Systematic Census of Australian Plants. The specific epithet (conferta) means "crowded".

== Distribution and habitat ==
Torrington beard-heath is only known from the type collection and is thought to grow in open forest or woodland on rocky granite soil near Torrington on the Northern Tablelands of New South Wales.

== Conservation status ==
Styphelia conferta (as Leucopogon confertus) is listed as "endangered" under the Australian Government Environment Protection and Biodiversity Conservation Act 1999 and the New South Wales Government Biodiversity Conservation Act 2016. The likely threats to the species include roadworks, grazing by feral goats and pigs, but repeated searches for the plant have failed, and it may already be extinct.
