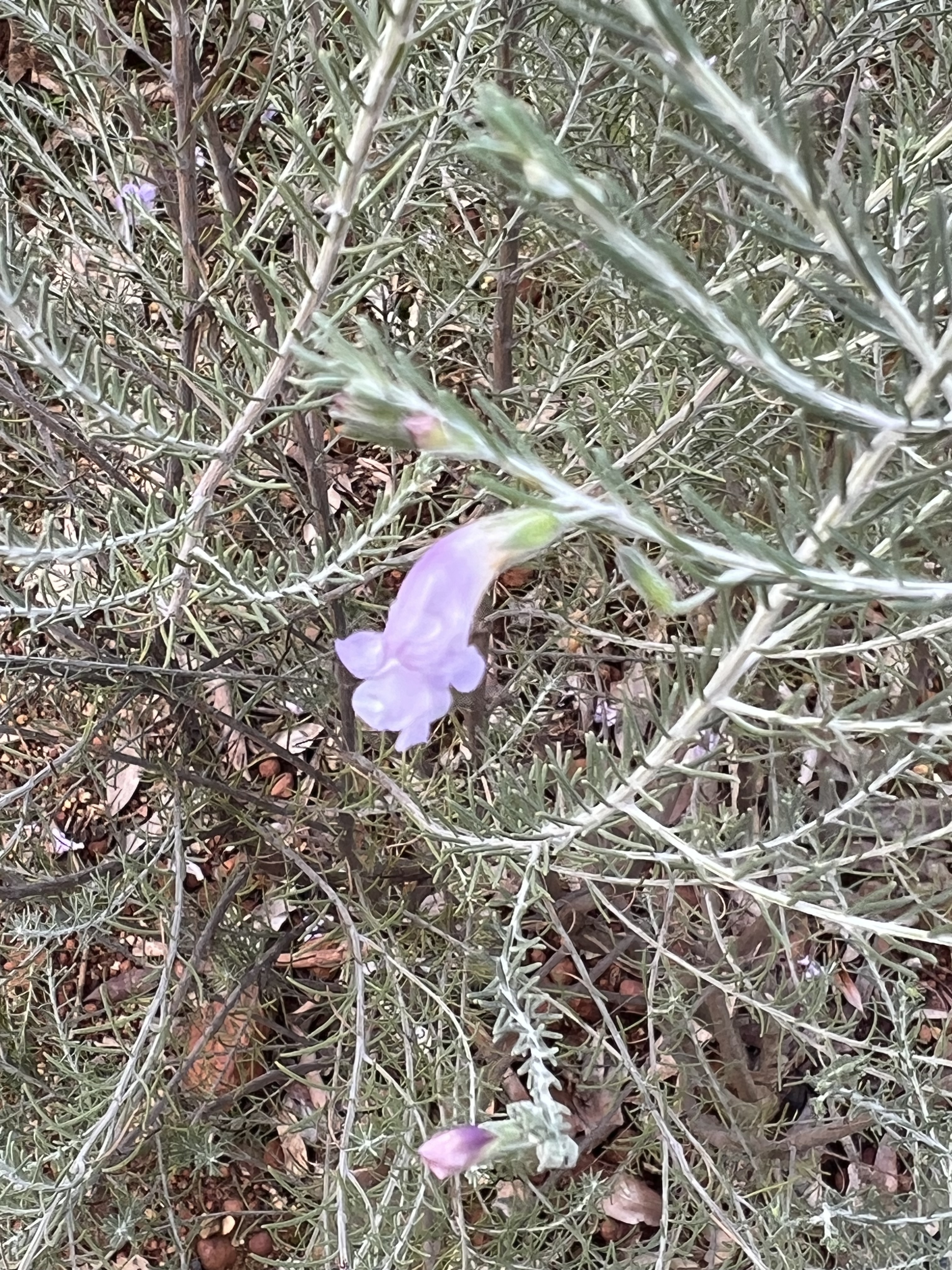

Conservation status
- Declared rare (DEC)

Scientific classification
- Kingdom: Plantae
- Clade: Embryophytes
- Clade: Tracheophytes
- Clade: Spermatophytes
- Clade: Angiosperms
- Clade: Eudicots
- Clade: Asterids
- Order: Lamiales
- Family: Scrophulariaceae
- Genus: Eremophila
- Species: E. subangustifolia

Binomial name
- Eremophila subangustifolia A.P.Br. & T.M.Llorens

= Eremophila subangustifolia =

Species of flowering plant

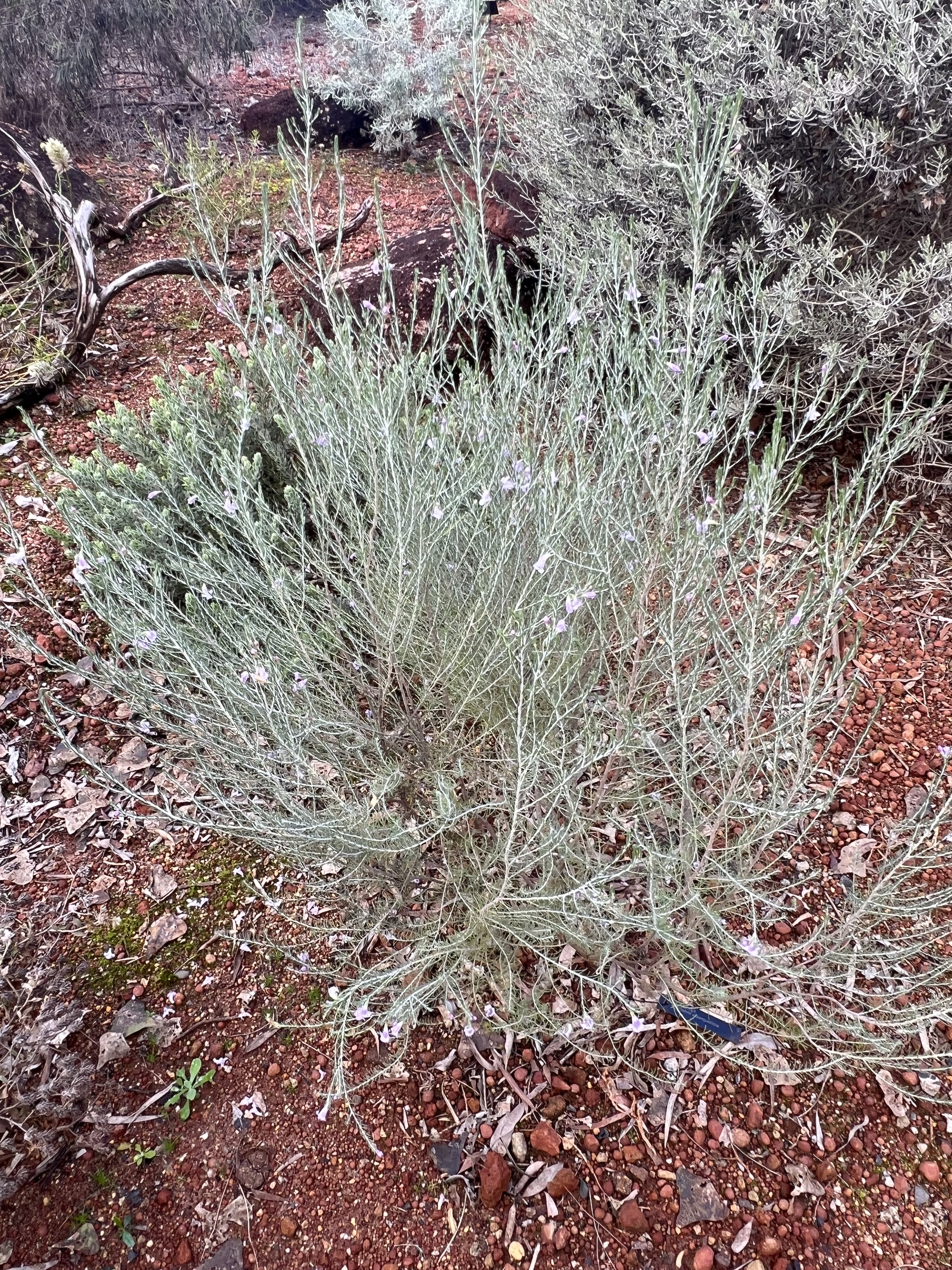
Habit

Eremophila subangustifolia is a flowering plant in the figwort family, Scrophulariaceae and is endemic to the south-west of Western Australia. It is a highly branched shrub which produces a slightly unpleasant odour and has its younger parts densely covered with greyish hairs. The leaves are scattered along the branches and the mostly white flowers are borne singly in leaf axils. It only occurs in a small area near Eneabba and had previously been known as E. microtheca subsp. 'narrow leaves'.

== Description ==
Eremophila subangustifolia is an erect shrub which grows to a height of 1–2.5 m (3–8 ft) and which emits a slightly unpleasant odour. The younger branches are densely covered with greyish hairs but become glabrous with age. The leaves are linear to almost cylindrical, 6–17 mm (0.2–0.7 in) long and 0.5–1 mm (0.02–0.04 in) wide. The flowers are borne singly in leaf axils on a stalk 5–7 mm (0.2–0.3 in) long. There are five hairy, overlapping, lance-shaped, tapering sepals which are 4–6 mm (0.16–0.24 in) long, about 1 mm (0.04 in) wide and pressed against the petals. The petals are 12–15 mm (0.5–0.6 in) long and are joined at their lower end to form a tube. The petals are pale lilac to purple on the outside and white inside with fawn-coloured to purple spots. The petal tube and lobes are glabrous except for a few hairs inside the tube. The four stamens are fully enclosed in the petal tube. Flowering occurs mainly from June to October and the fruits which follow are dry, oval-shaped, wrinkled, glabrous and 2–2.5 mm (0.08–0.1 in) long.

This eremophila is very similar to E. microtheca and was previously known as E. microtheca subsp. 'narrow leaves'. (E. microtheca has flatter leaves.)

== Taxonomy and naming ==
Eremophila subangustifolia was first formally described in 2018 by Andrew Brown and Tanya Llorens from a specimen collected near Eneabba and the description was published in Nuytsia. The specific epithet (subangustifolia) is derived from the Latin sub- meaning "somewhat", angustus meaning "narrow" and -folius meaning "leaved" referring to the leaves of this species compared to the similar E. microtheca.

== Distribution and habitat ==
Eremophila subangustifolia grows in slightly salty soils near the edges of winter-wet flats and lakes near Eneabba in the Kalbarri and Eneabba in the Geraldton Sandplains biogeographic region.

== Conservation ==
Eremophila subangustifolia is classified as "Threatened Flora (Declared Rare Flora — Extant)" by the Western Australian Government Department of Parks and Wildlife.
