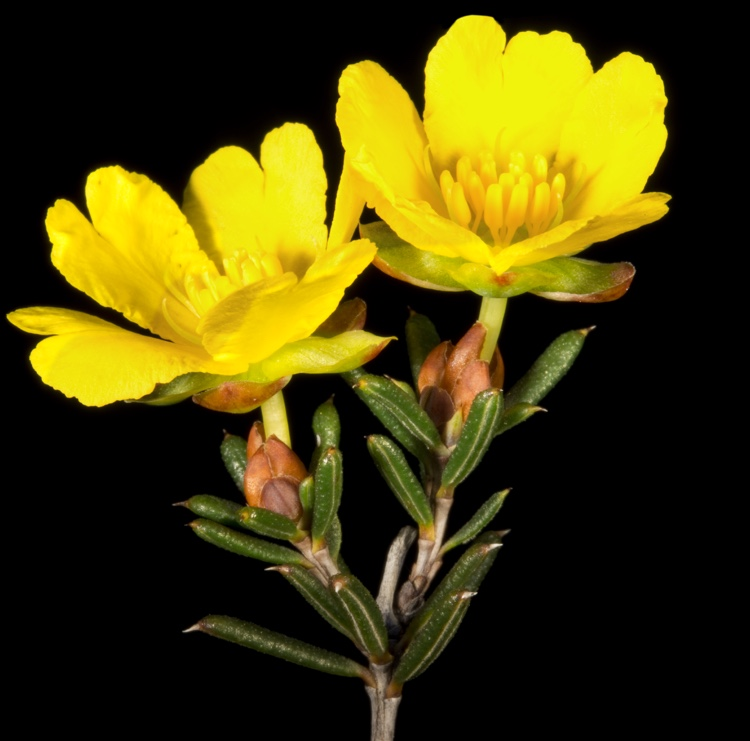

Scientific classification
- Kingdom: Plantae
- Clade: Tracheophytes
- Clade: Angiosperms
- Clade: Eudicots
- Order: Dilleniales
- Family: Dilleniaceae
- Genus: Hibbertia
- Species: H. uncinata

Binomial name
- Hibbertia uncinata (Benth.) F.Muell.

= Hibbertia uncinata =

Species of flowering plant

Hibbertia ulicifolia is a species of flowering plant in the family Dilleniaceae and is endemic to the south-west of Western Australia. It is an erect shrub that typically grows to a height of 0.2–1 m (7.9 in – 3 ft 3.4 in).

It was first formally described in 1863 by George Bentham who gave it the name Candollea uncinata in Flora Australiensis from specimens collected by James Drummond. In 1882, Ferdinand von Mueller changed the name to Hibbertia uncinata in his Systematic Census of Australian Plants. The specific epithet (uncinata) means "hooked", referring to the leaves.

This hibbertia grows on slopes, hills and floodplains in the Avon Wheatbelt biogeographical region of south-western Western Australia.

== Conservation status ==
Hibbertia uncinata is classified as "not threatened" by the Western Australian Government Department of Parks and Wildlife.

== See also ==
- List of Hibbertia species
