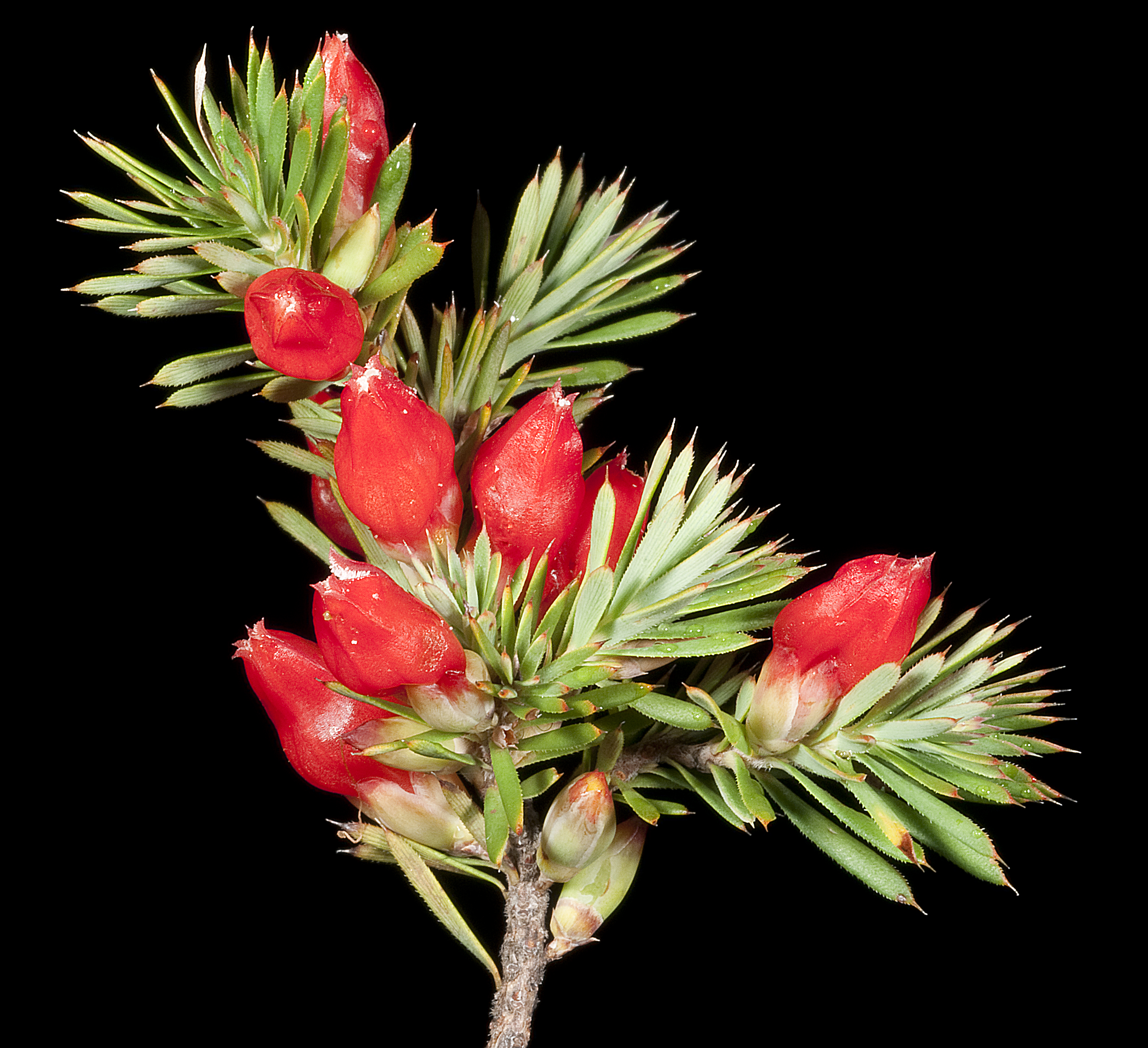

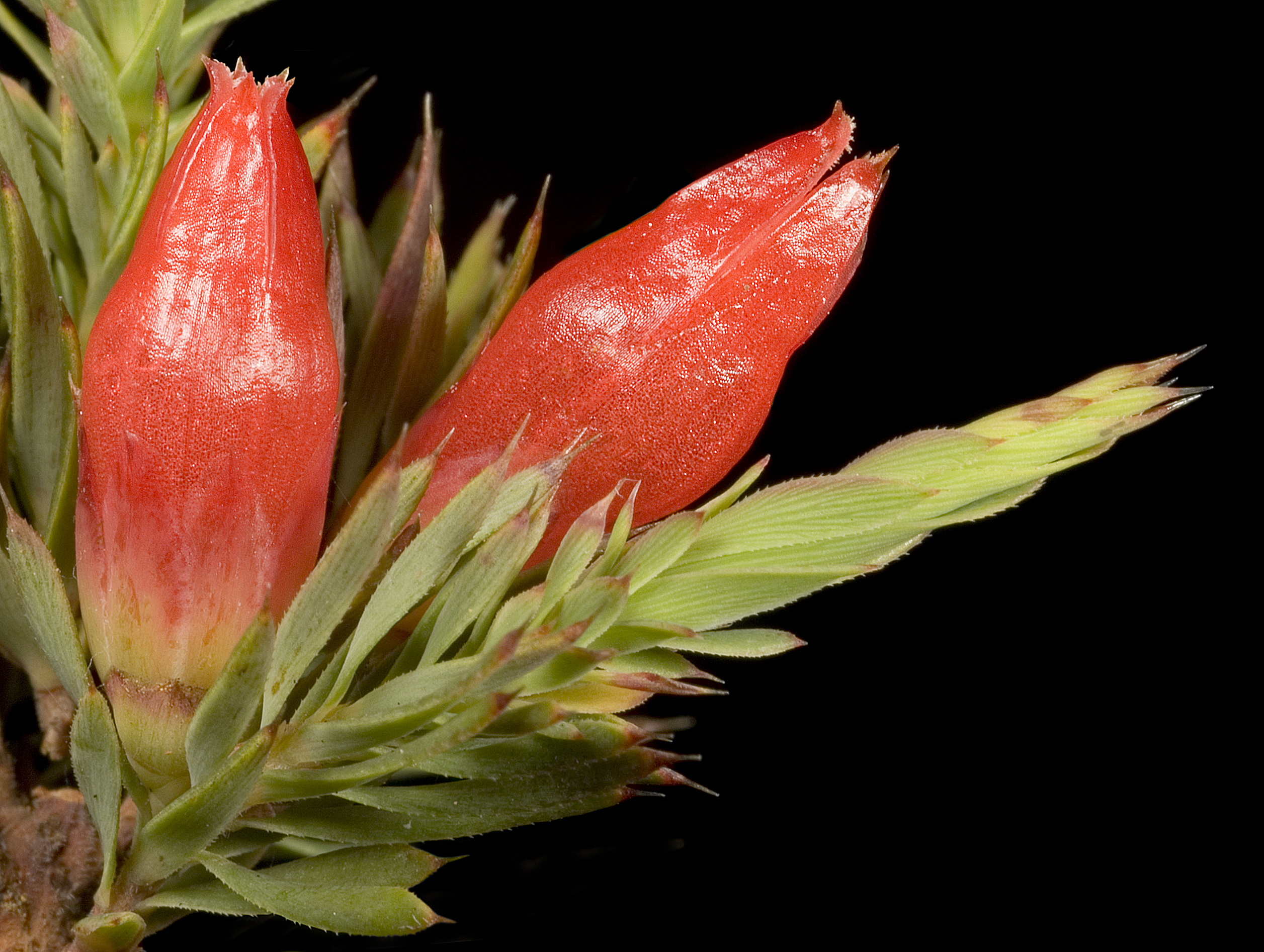

Scientific classification
- Kingdom: Plantae
- Clade: Tracheophytes
- Clade: Angiosperms
- Clade: Eudicots
- Clade: Asterids
- Order: Ericales
- Family: Ericaceae
- Genus: Styphelia
- Species: S. tortifolia

Binomial name
- Styphelia tortifolia Hislop, Crayn & Puente-Lel.

Synonyms
- Astroloma glaucescens Sond.

= Styphelia tortifolia =

Species of shrub

Styphelia tortifolia is a species of flowering plant in the heath family Ericaceae and is endemic to the south-west of Western Australia. It is a shrub with linear or narrowly oblong leaves, and red, tube-shaped flowers with bearded lobes.

== Description ==
Styphelia tortifolia is a much-branched shrub that typically grows to a height of 30–60 cm (12–24 in), the branchlets with soft hairs. The leaves are linear to narrowly oblong and sharply pointed, usually 6.5–8.5 mm (0.26–0.33 in) long with the edges rolled under and often glaucous on the lower surface. The flowers are almost sessile with bracteoles less than 2 mm (0.079 in) long at the base. The sepals are 4.3–5.2 mm (0.17–0.20 in) long and often hairy. The petals are joined at the base, forming a tube 8.6–10.8 mm (0.34–0.43 in) long with erect lobes with pointed tips and bearded on the inside near the end. The fruit is scarcely as long as the sepals.

== Taxonomy ==
This species was first formally described in 1845 by Otto Sonder who gave it the name Astroloma glaucescens in Lehmann's Plantae Preissianae. However, in 2020 phylogenetic studies by Darren Crayn, Michael Hislop and Caroline Puente-Lelièvre determined that Astroloma needed to be sunk into Styphelia. Since the name Styphelia glaucescens had already been used for a different plant species, (now known as Styphelia triflora), the species was given the name S. tortifolia. The specific epithet (tortifolia) means "twisted leaves".

== Distribution ==
Styphelia tortifolia occurs in the Avon Wheatbelt, Geraldton Sandplains, Jarrah Forest and Swan Coastal Plain bioregions of south-western Western Australia.
