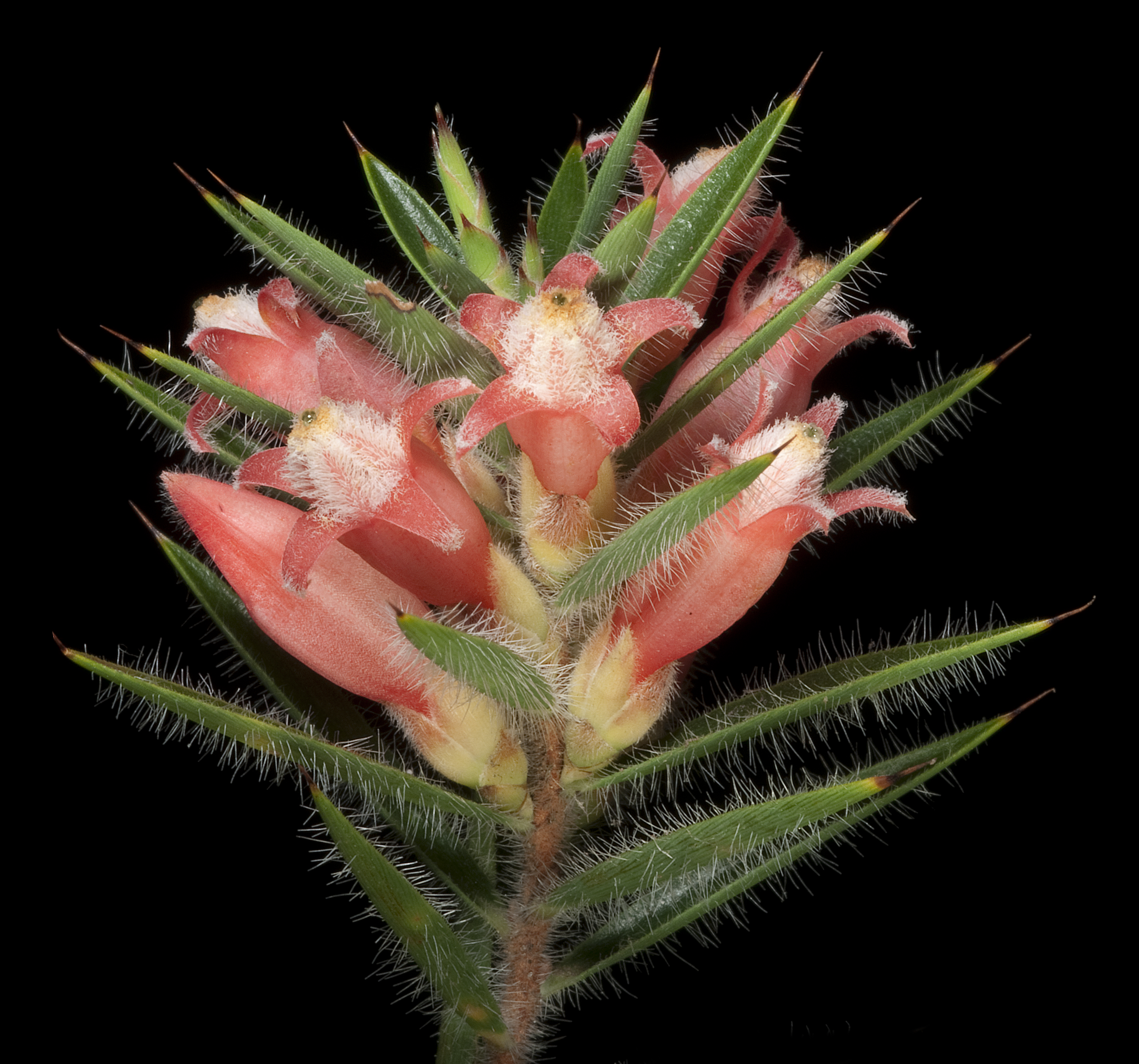

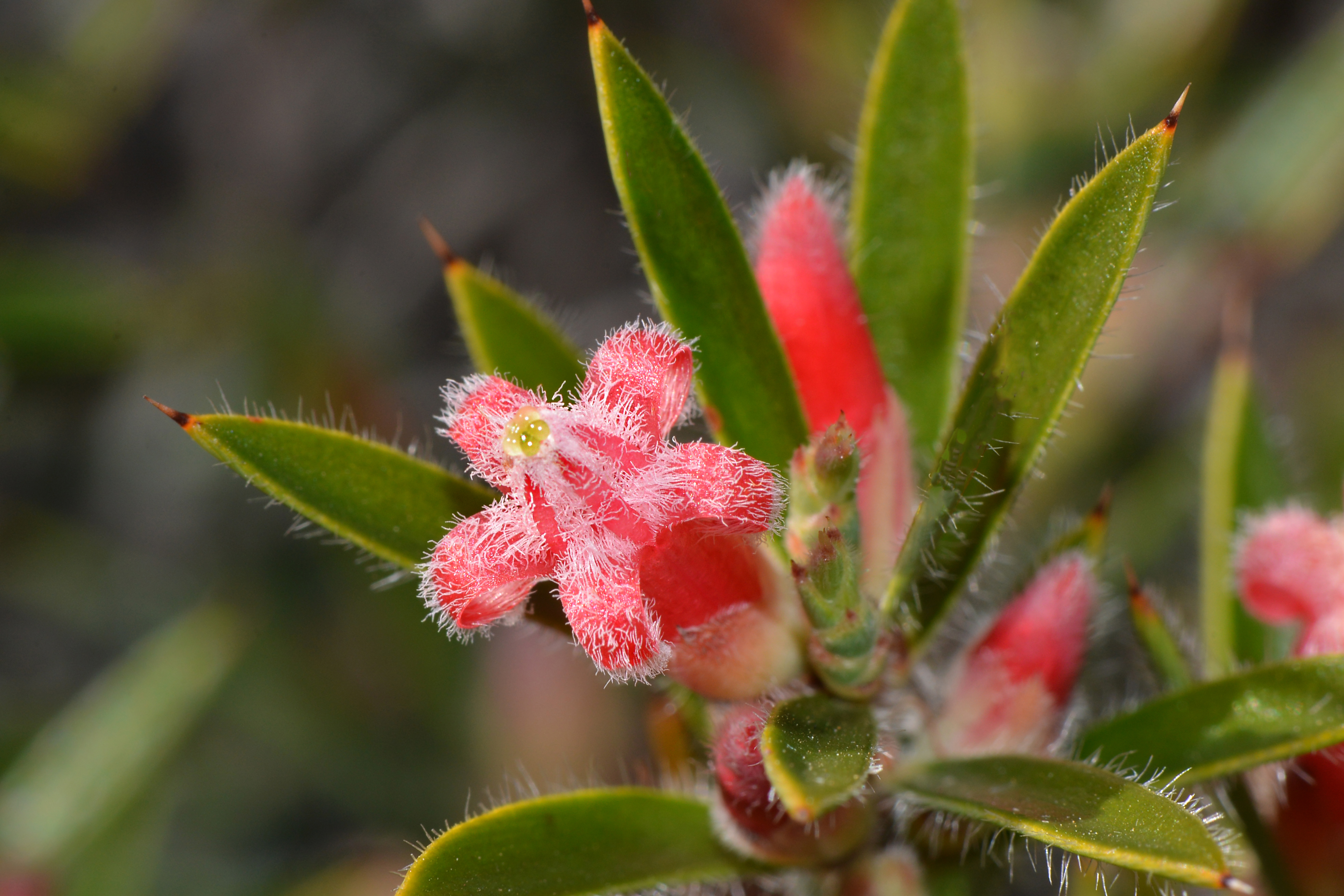

Scientific classification
- Kingdom: Plantae
- Clade: Tracheophytes
- Clade: Angiosperms
- Clade: Eudicots
- Clade: Asterids
- Order: Ericales
- Family: Ericaceae
- Genus: Styphelia
- Species: S. stomarrhena

Binomial name
- Styphelia stomarrhena (Sond.) Sleumer

Synonyms
- Astroloma stomarrhena Sond.; Astroloma lasionemum F.Muell.; Styphelia lasionema F.Muell.

= Styphelia stomarrhena =

Species of shrub

Styphelia stomarrhena (common name - red swamp cranberry) is a species of flowering plant in the family Ericaceae and is endemic to the south-west of Western Australia. It is a low, spreading or compact shrub with narrowly elliptic, sharply-pointed leaves and red, tube-shaped flowers usually arranged singly in leaf axils.

== Description ==
Styphelia stomarrhena is a low, spreading or compact shrub that typically grows up to about 30 cm (12 in) high and 40 cm (16 in) wide, its young branchlets covered with spreading hairs. The leaves are mostly narrowly elliptic, 10–23 mm (0.39–0.91 in) long and 2.7–4.5 mm (0.11–0.18 in) wide and sharply pointed, on a petiole 0.7–2.0 mm (0.028–0.079 in) wide. The flowers are sessile and arranged singly, sometimes in pairs, in leaf axils, with elliptic bracts 2.8–3.8 mm (0.11–0.15 in) and bracteoles 3.7–5.0 mm (0.15–0.20 in) long at the base. The sepals are narrowly elliptic, 7.0–8.5 mm (0.28–0.33 in) long and hairy, the petals red and joined at the base to form a tube 10.2–16.5 mm (0.40–0.65 in) long with lobes 6.0–7.4 mm (0.24–0.29 in) long, turned back or rolled under and hairy. Flowering mainly occurs between May and July and the fruit is 3.5–3.8 mm (0.14–0.15 in) long, 4.2–4.8 mm (0.17–0.19 in) wide and has a rough surface.

== Taxonomy ==
This species was first described in 1845 by Otto Wihelm Sonder who gave it the name Astroloma stomarrhena in Lehmann's Plantae Preissianae from specimens collected near the Swan River Colony by James Drummond. In 1964 Hermann Otto Sleumer assigned it to the genus Styphelia in the journal Blumea. The specific epithet (stomarrhena) means "male mouth", referring to the stamens projecting from the petal tube.

== Distribution and habitat ==
Red swamp cranberry is found in the IBRA regions of southern Geraldton Sandplains and northern Swan Coastal Plain bioregions, with some occurrences in the Avon Wheatbelt and Jarrah Forest bioregions, on deep sandy soils or sand on laterite, in Banksia woodland or heathland communities.
