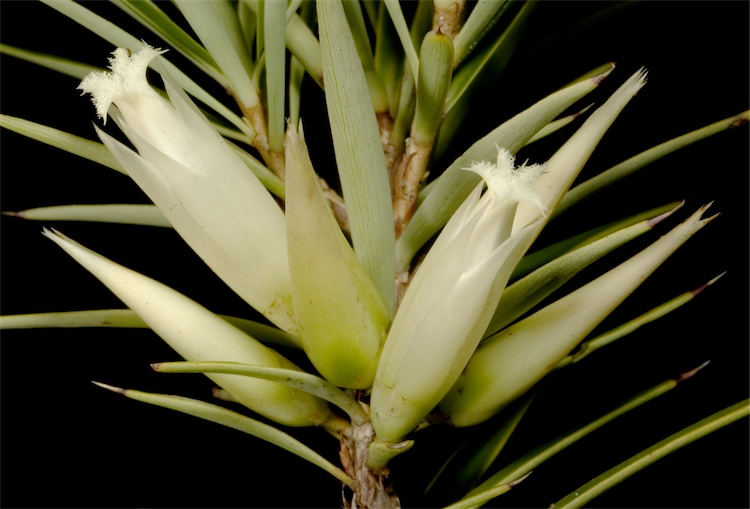
- In the Kensington Bushland Reserve

Scientific classification
- Kingdom: Plantae
- Clade: Tracheophytes
- Clade: Angiosperms
- Clade: Eudicots
- Clade: Asterids
- Order: Ericales
- Family: Ericaceae
- Genus: Styphelia
- Species: S. macrocalyx

Binomial name
- Styphelia macrocalyx (Sond.) F.Muell.

Synonyms
- Astroloma macrocalyx Sond.

= Styphelia macrocalyx =

Species of plant

Styphelia macrocalyx, commonly known as Swan berry, is a species of flowering plant in the heath family Ericaceae and is endemic to the south west of Western Australia. It is a shrub with sharply pointed, narrowly lance-shaped leaves and white, tube-shaped flowers with tufts of hairs on the inside.

== Description ==
Styphelia macrocalyx is an erect shrub that typically grows up to a height of 0.3–1.0 m (1 ft 0 in – 3 ft 3 in) and has glabrous branches. Its leaves are crowded, sharply-pointed, narrowly lance-shaped 2–3 mm (0.079–0.118 in) long, concave and striated. The flowers are about the same length as the leaves, with pointed bracteoles 4–6 mm (0.16–0.24 in) long. The sepals are 15–17 mm (0.59–0.67 in) long, the petals white and about the same length as the sepals.

== Taxonomy and naming ==
This species was first formally described in 1845 by Otto Wilhelm Sonder who gave it the name Astroloma macrocalyx in Johann Georg Christian Lehmann's Plantae Preissianae. In 1867, Ferdinand von Mueller transferred the species to Styphelia as S. macrocalyx in his Fragmenta phytographiae Australiae. The specific epithet (macrocalyx) means "large sepals".

== Distribution ==
This styphelia occurs in the Avon Wheatbelt, Jarrah Forest and Swan Coastal Plain bioregions in the south-west of Western Australia.

== Conservation status ==
Styphelia macrocalyx is listed as "not threatened" by the Government of Western Australia Department of Biodiversity, Conservation and Attractions.
