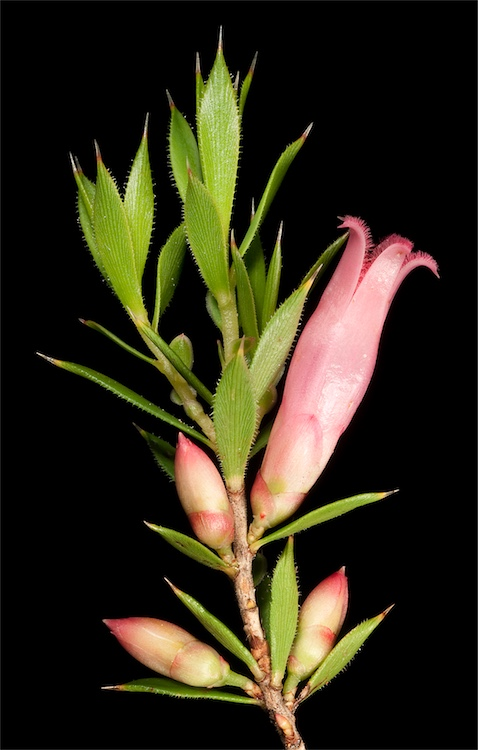
- In Lesueur National Park

Scientific classification
- Kingdom: Plantae
- Clade: Tracheophytes
- Clade: Angiosperms
- Clade: Eudicots
- Clade: Asterids
- Order: Ericales
- Family: Ericaceae
- Genus: Styphelia
- Species: S. microdonta

Binomial name
- Styphelia microdonta (Benth.) F.Muell.

Synonyms
- Astroloma microdonta F.Muell.

= Styphelia microdonta =

Species of flowering plants

Styphelia microdonta is a species of flowering plant in the heath family Ericaceae and is endemic to the south west of Western Australia. It is an erect shrub with sharply-pointed, lance-shaped leaves and red, tube-shaped flowers that are bearded inside.

== Description ==
Styphelia microdonta is an erect shrub that typically grows up to a height of 60–90 cm (24–35 in) and has wand-like, sometimes softly-hairy branches. Its leaves are lance-shaped and sharply-pointed, mostly about 12 mm (0.47 in) long and minutely toothed. The flowers are red and nearly sessile with small bracts and bracteoles scarcely more than 2 mm (0.079 in) long at the base. The sepals are about 6.5 mm (0.26 in) long, the petals joined at the base to form a tube scarcely longer than the sepals, with lobes as long as the petal tube and densely bearded inside.

== Taxonomy and naming ==
This species was first formally described in 1868 by George Bentham who gave it the name Astroloma microdonta in Flora Australiensis from specimens collected near the Murchison River. In 1882 Ferdinand von Mueller transferred the species to Styphelia as S. microdonta in his Systematic Census of Australian Plants. The specific epithet (microdonta) means "small toothed", referring to the leaves and sepals.

== Distribution ==
This styphelia grows in near-coastal areas of the Avon Wheatbelt, Geraldton Sandplains and Swan Coastal Plain bioregions of south-western Western Australia.

== Conservation status ==
Styphelia microdonta is listed as "not threatened" by the Government of Western Australia Department of Biodiversity, Conservation and Attractions.
