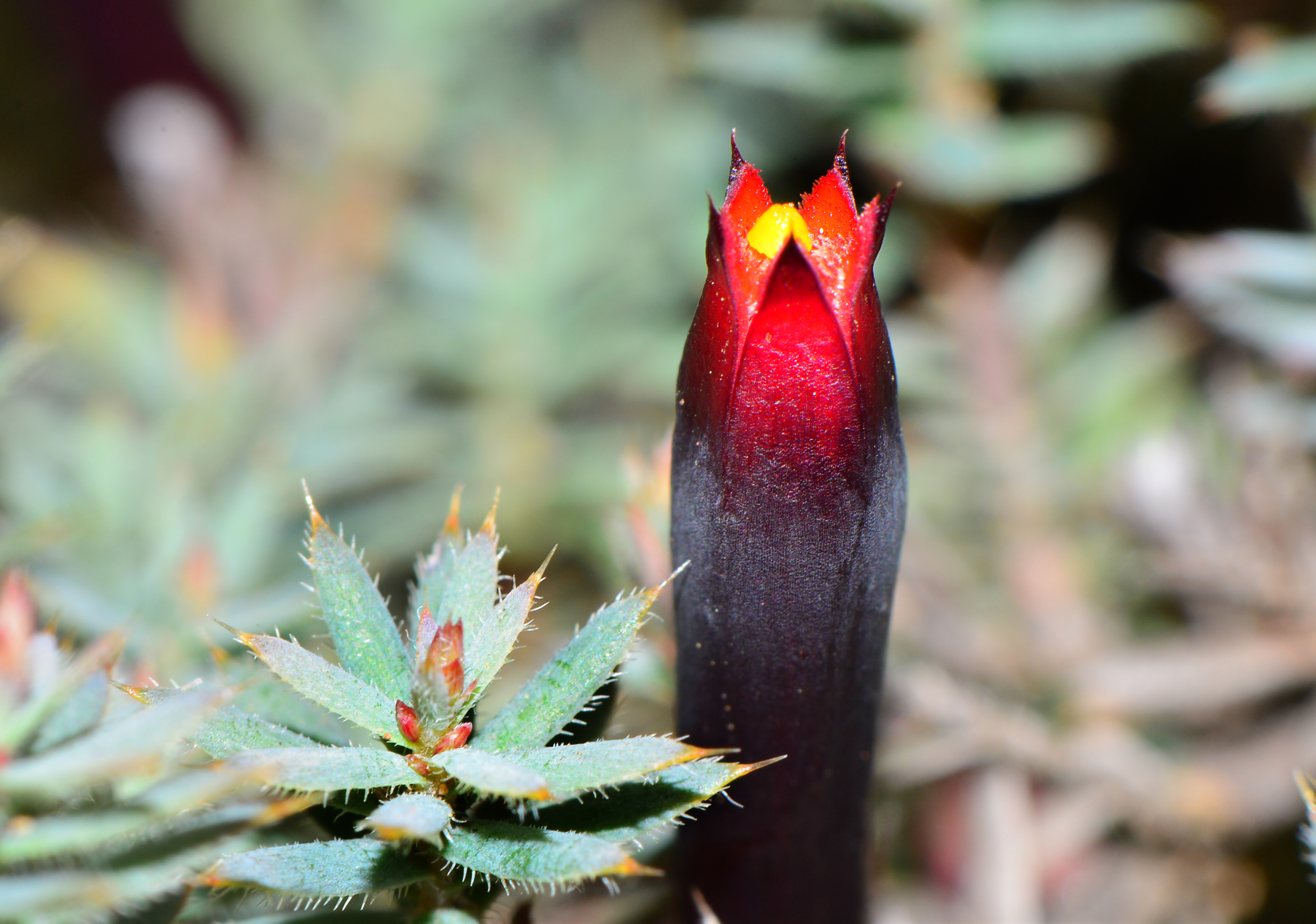

Scientific classification
- Kingdom: Plantae
- Clade: Tracheophytes
- Clade: Angiosperms
- Clade: Eudicots
- Clade: Asterids
- Order: Ericales
- Family: Ericaceae
- Genus: Styphelia
- Species: S. discolor

Binomial name
- Styphelia discolor (Sond.) Hislop, Crayn & Puente-Lel.

Synonyms
- Astroloma discolor Sond.; Astroloma ciliatum (Lindl.) Druce; Astroloma dilatatum Sond.; Astroloma longiflorum Sond. nom. superfl.; Astroloma longiflorum var. dilatatum (Sond.) Benth.; Mesotriche discolor Stschegl.; Mesotriche longiflora Stschegl. nom. superfl.; Stenanthera ciliata Lindl.; Styphelia longiflora F.Muell.

= Styphelia discolor =

Species of plant

Styphelia discolor is a species of flowering plant in the heath family Ericaceae and is endemic to the south-west of Western Australia. It is a shrub, usually with prostrate stems and spreading, tapering linear leaves and almost sessile red flowers.

== Description ==
Styphelia discolor is a shrub usually with prostrate stems and short, ascending, softly-hairy branches. The leaves are spreading and linear, up to 6.5 mm (0.26 in) long with the edges turned down and fine points on the edges. The flowers are red, tube-shaped and almost sessile with very small bracts and bracteoles about 2 mm (0.079 in) long. The petal tube is about 19 mm (0.75 in) long and glabrous inside with lance-shaped lobes that are bearded only at the base.

== Taxonomy ==
This species was first formally described in 1845 by Otto Wilhelm Sonder who gave it the name Astroloma discolor in Lehmann's Plantae Preissianae from specimens collected near Perth. In 2020, Michael Hislop, Darren Crayn and Caroline Puente-Lelievre transferred it to the genus Styphelia as S. discolor.

== Distribution ==
Styphelia discolor is widespread in the Avon Wheatbelt, Esperance Plains, Geraldton Sandplains, Jarrah Forest, Mallee, Swan Coastal Plain and Warren bioregions of south-western Western Australia.
