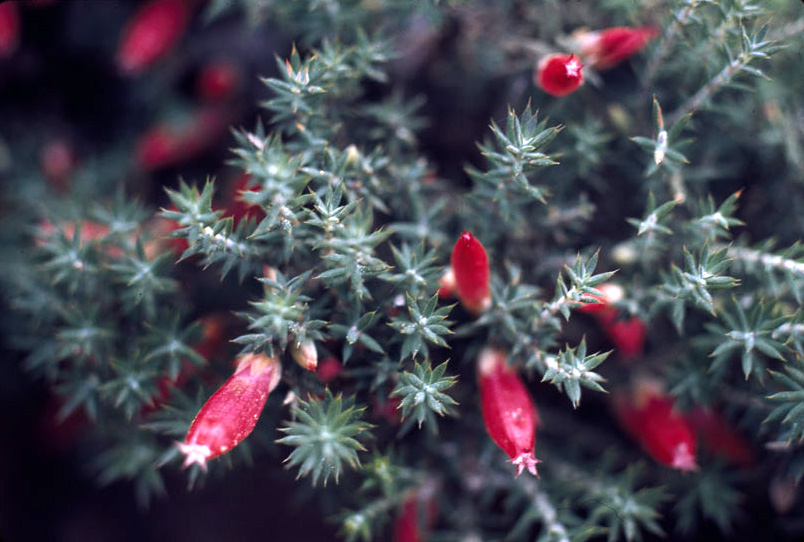
- In the Porongurup National Park

Scientific classification
- Kingdom: Plantae
- Clade: Tracheophytes
- Clade: Angiosperms
- Clade: Eudicots
- Clade: Asterids
- Order: Ericales
- Family: Ericaceae
- Genus: Styphelia
- Species: S. microcalyx

Binomial name
- Styphelia microcalyx (Sond.) F.Muell.

Synonyms
- Astroloma microcalyx Sond.

= Styphelia microcalyx =

Species of plant

Styphelia microcalyx, commonly known as native cranberry, is a species of flowering plant in the heath family Ericaceae and is endemic to the south west of Western Australia. It is a much-branched, erect or diffuse shrub with linear or narrowly oblong leaves and red, tube-shaped flowers that are bearded inside.

== Description ==
Styphelia microcalyx is an erect or diffuse shrub that typically grows up to a height of 30–60 cm (12–24 in) and has many, minutely softly-hairy branches. Its leaves are linear to narrowly oblong, usually 6.5–8.7 mm (0.26–0.34 in) long, sometimes with a small hard point on the tip and sometimes minutely toothed. The flowers are red and nearly sessile with bracteoles less than 2 mm (0.079 in) long at the base. The sepals are 4.3–5.4 mm (0.17–0.21 in) long, the petals joined at the base to form a tube 8.5–11 mm (0.33–0.43 in) long, with erect lobes that are bearded inside.

== Taxonomy and naming ==
This species was first formally described in 1845 by Otto Wilhelm Sonder who gave it the name Astroloma microcalyx in Lehmann's Plantae Preissianae. In 1867 Ferdinand von Mueller transferred the species to Styphelia as S. microcalyx in his Fragmenta Phytographiae Australiae. The specific epithet (microcalyx) means "small sepals".

== Distribution ==
This styphelia grows in near-coastal areas of the Swan Coastal Plain bioregion of south-western Western Australia.

== Conservation status ==
Styphelia melaleucoides is listed as "not threatened" by the Government of Western Australia Department of Biodiversity, Conservation and Attractions.
