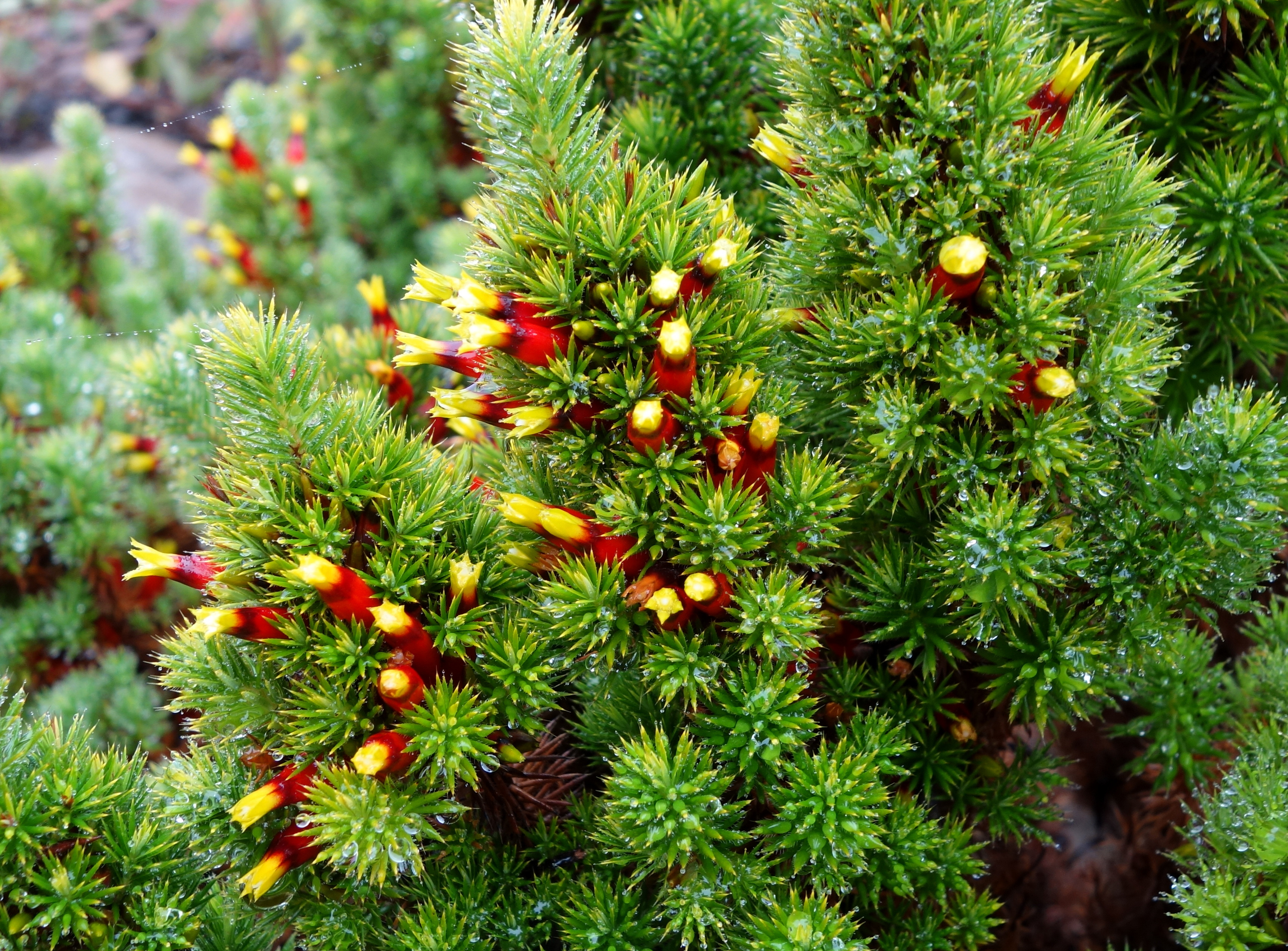

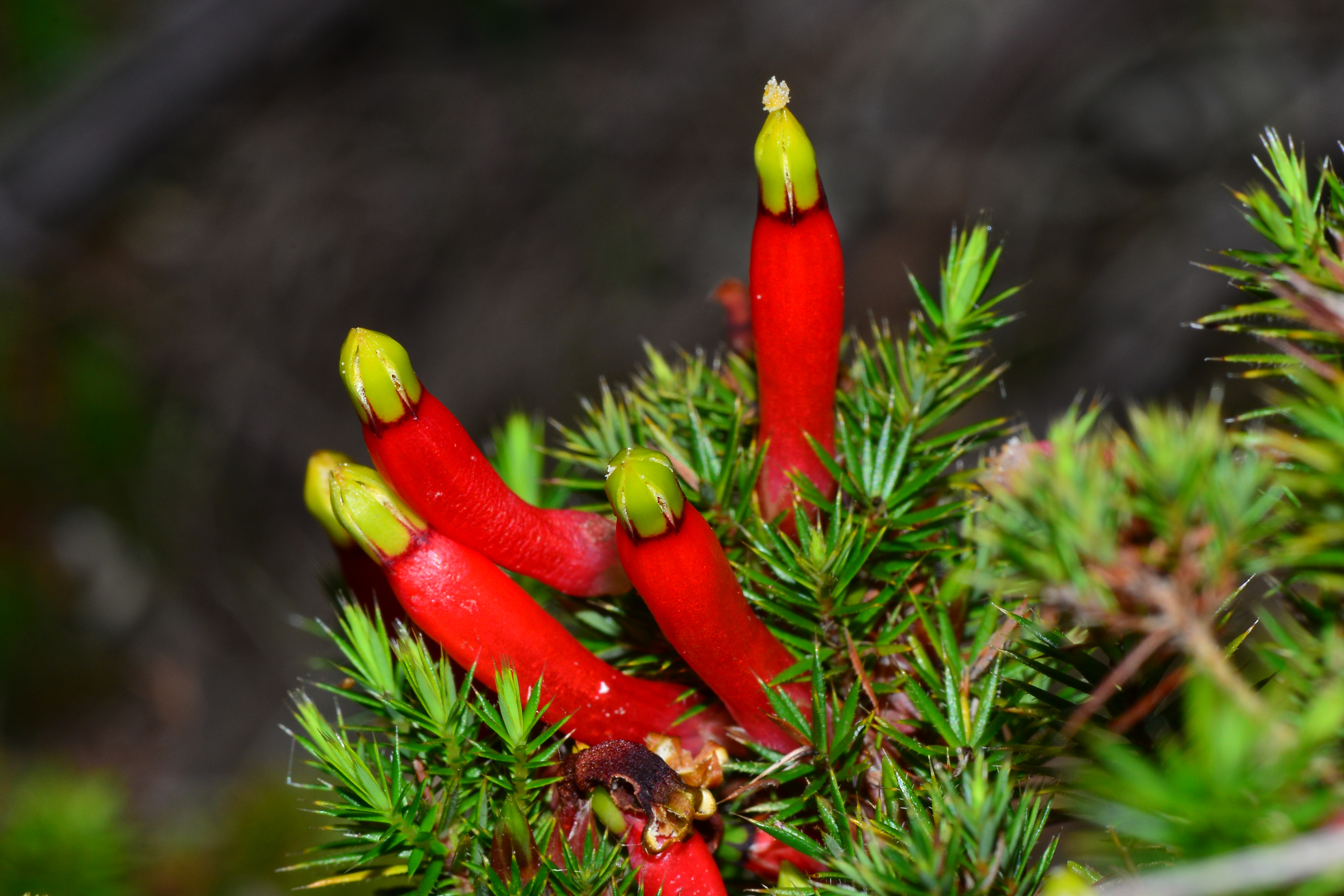

Scientific classification
- Kingdom: Plantae
- Clade: Tracheophytes
- Clade: Angiosperms
- Clade: Eudicots
- Clade: Asterids
- Order: Ericales
- Family: Ericaceae
- Genus: Styphelia
- Species: S. foliosa

Binomial name
- Styphelia foliosa (Sond.) Hislop, Crayn & Puente-Lel.

Synonyms
- Astroloma foliosum Sond.

= Styphelia foliosa =

Species of flowering plant

Styphelia foliosa, commonly known as candle cranberry, is a species of flowering plant in the family Ericaceae and is endemic to the Perth region of Western Australia.

The species was first formally described in 1845 by German botanist Otto Wilhelm Sonder, who gave it the name Astroloma foliosum in Lehmann's Plantae Preissianae, based on plant material collected by James Drummond at Maddington. In 2020, Michael Hislop, Darren Crayn and Caroline Puente-Lelievre transferred the species to Styphelia as S. foliosa in Australian Systematic Botany.

Styphelia foliosa occurs near Perth in the Jarrah Forest and Swan Coastal Plain bioregions of south-western Western Australia.
