= Styphelia prostrata =

Scientific classification
- Kingdom: Plantae
- Clade: Tracheophytes
- Clade: Angiosperms
- Clade: Eudicots
- Clade: Asterids
- Order: Ericales
- Family: Ericaceae
- Genus: Styphelia
- Species: S. prostrata

Binomial name
- Styphelia prostrata (R.Br.) Spreng.

Synonyms
- Astroloma prostratum R.Br.

Species of plant

Styphelia prostrata is a species of flowering plant in the heath family Ericaceae and is endemic to the south-west of Western Australia. It is a low, spreading or prostrate shrub with linear leaves and red, tube-shaped flowers that are bearded inside.

== Description ==
Styphelia prostrata is a low, spreading or prostrate shrub that has many ascending or erect branches that are covered with soft hairs. Its leaves are linear to lance-shaped, less than 12 mm (0.47 in) long, tapering to a short, fine point. The flowers have bracteoles less than 2 mm (0.079 in) long the base. The sepals are 4–6 mm (0.16–0.24 in) long, the petals red and joined at the base, forming a tube about 8.5 mm (0.33 in) long, with lobes 4 mm (0.16 in) long and bearded inside.

== Taxonomy ==
This species was first formally described in 1810 by Robert Brown, who gave it the name Astroloma prostratum in his Prodromus Florae Novae Hollandiae et Insulae Van Diemen. In 1882, Ferdinand von Mueller transferred the species to Styphelia as S. prostrata in his Systematic Census of Australian Plants. The specific epithet, prostrata means "prostrate" or "lying along the ground".

== Distribution ==
This styphelia is found in the Esperance Plains, Jarrah Forest and Mallee bioregions of southern Western Australia.

== Conservation status ==
Styphelia prostrata is listed as "not threatened", by the Western Australian Government Department of Biodiversity, Conservation and Attractions.
