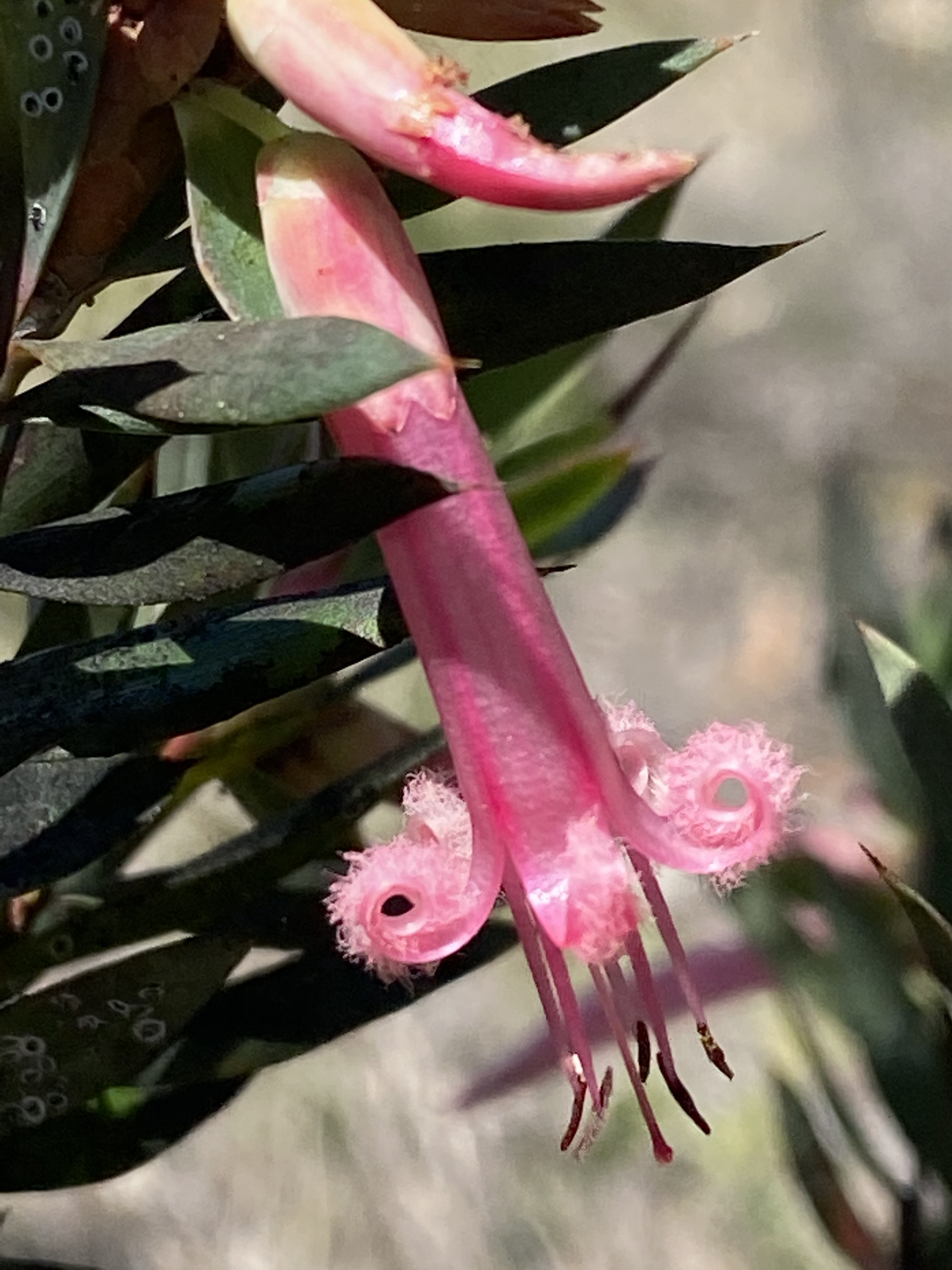

Scientific classification
- Kingdom: Plantae
- Clade: Tracheophytes
- Clade: Angiosperms
- Clade: Eudicots
- Clade: Asterids
- Order: Ericales
- Family: Ericaceae
- Genus: Styphelia
- Species: S. triflora

Binomial name
- Styphelia triflora Andrews

Synonyms
- Styphelia triflora Andrews var. triflora; Styphelia laeta var. glabra R.T.Baker

= Styphelia triflora =

Pink five-corners

Species of flowering plant

Styphelia triflora, commonly known as pink five-corners, is a flowering plant in the heath family Ericaceae. It is an erect, spreading shrub with broad leaves with a spiky tip, and usually pink tubular flowers with the petals rolled back revealing the fluffy insides. It is found in New South Wales and Queensland growing on loam or sandy soils.

== Description ==
Styphelia triflora is a spreading to bushy shrub which grows up to 0.4–2 m (1–7 ft) tall with mostly smooth branchlets. Its leaves are mostly elliptic to oblong-elliptic in shape, 14–33 mm (0.6–1 in) long, 3–8.5 mm (0.1–0.3 in) wide, edges usually smooth and ending in a sharp point on the tip. The flowers are tube-shaped, pendulous or spreading, mostly pink to red, sometimes light yellow-green or cream. The corolla is 13.5–29.4 mm (0.53–1.16 in) long forming a tube 12–14 mm (0.5–0.6 in) long. The five stamens are straight and extend prominently beyond the end of the petal tube, sepals 8.2–13.4 mm (0.32–0.53 in) long and smooth. The finely ribbed fruit are 6.5–8 mm (0.26–0.31 in) long. Flowering occurs mostly between April and October.

== Taxonomy and naming ==
Styphelia triflora was first formally described in 1799 by Henry Cranke Andrews and the description was published in The Botanist's Repository for New, and Rare Plants. The specific epithet (triflora) means "three flowered".

== Distribution and habitat ==
Pink five-corners is a widespread species in New South Wales, growing in woodlands and open sclerophyll forests on moist sandy soils or loams including coastal areas north of Jervis Bay and the upper Blue Mountains.
