= Styphelia inopinata =

Conservation status
- Priority One — Poorly Known Taxa (DEC)

Scientific classification
- Kingdom: Plantae
- Clade: Tracheophytes
- Clade: Angiosperms
- Clade: Eudicots
- Clade: Asterids
- Order: Ericales
- Family: Ericaceae
- Genus: Styphelia
- Species: S. inopinata

Binomial name
- Styphelia inopinata (Hislop) Hislop, Crayn & Puente-Lel.

Synonyms
- Astroloma inopinatum Hislop

Species of plant

Styphelia inopinata is a species of flowering plant in the heath family Ericaceae and is endemic to the west of Western Australia. It is a robust, spreading shrub with hairy young branchlets and usually erect, narrowly elliptic, sharply-pointed leaves and reddish pink, very narrowly bell-shaped flowers, usually arranged singly in leaf axils.

== Description ==
Styphelia inopinata is a robust, shrub up to 1.8 m (5 ft 11 in) high and wide, and has hairy young branchlets. The leaves are erect, narrowly elliptic, 11–24 mm (0.43–0.94 in) long and 1.9–3.6 mm (0.075–0.142 in) wide on a creamy yellow petiole 0.6–1.1 mm (0.024–0.043 in) long and a sharp point 1.0–1.6 mm (0.039–0.063 in) long on the end. The flowers are usually borne singly (sometimes in pairs) in leaf axils with egg-shaped sepals 3.3–4.0 mm (0.13–0.16 in) long and bracts 1.2–1.4 mm (0.047–0.055 in) long and bracteoles 1.6–2.0 mm (0.063–0.079 in) long at the base. The petals are joined at the base to form a bell-shaped, red tube, 6.5–7.5 mm (0.26–0.30 in) long with lobes 4.0–4.5 mm (0.16–0.18 in) long. Flowering depends on rainfall and often occurs between March and July.

== Taxonomy ==
This species was first formally described in 2013 by Michael Hislop who gave it the name Astroloma inopinatum in the journal Nuytsia from specimens collected east of Kalbarri in 2008. In 2020, Michael Hislop, Darren Crayn and Caroline Puente-Lelievre transferred it to the genus Styphelia as S. inopinata.

== Distribution ==
Styphelia inopinata is only known from a granite breakaway north of the Murchison River, east of Kalbarri National Park in the Geraldton Sandplains bioregion of western Western Australia.

== Conservation status ==
Styphelia inopinata is listed as "Priority One" by the Government of Western Australia Department of Biodiversity, Conservation and Attractions, meaning that it is known from only one or a few locations which are potentially at risk.
