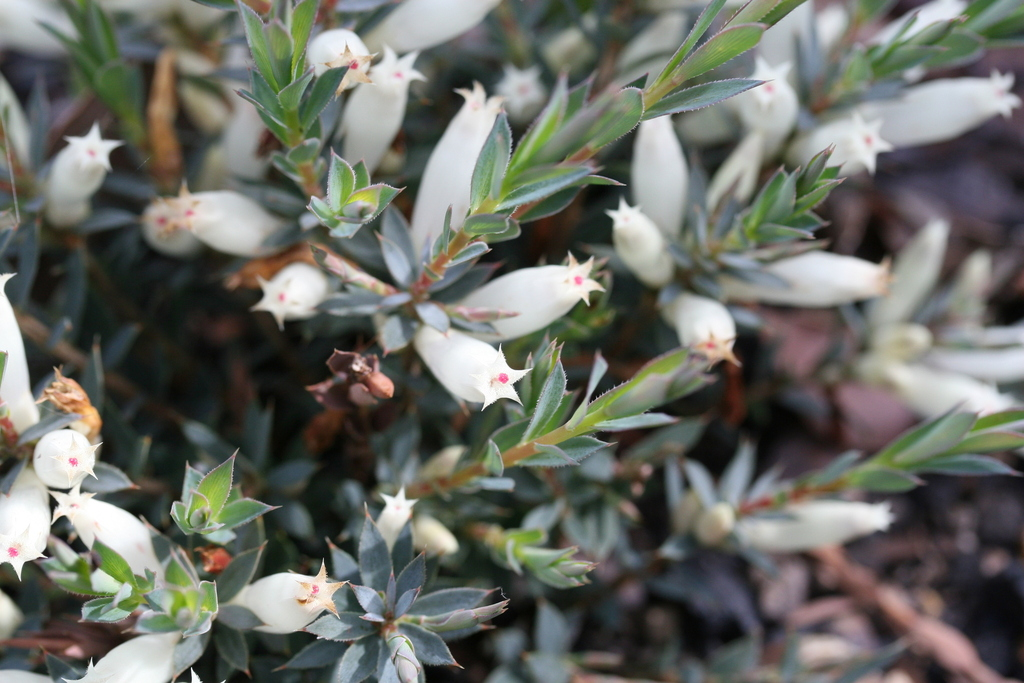

Scientific classification
- Kingdom: Plantae
- Clade: Tracheophytes
- Clade: Angiosperms
- Clade: Eudicots
- Clade: Asterids
- Order: Ericales
- Family: Ericaceae
- Genus: Styphelia
- Species: S. acervata

Binomial name
- Styphelia acervata (Hislop & A.J.G.Wilson) Hislop, Crayn & Puente-Lel.

Synonyms
- Astroloma acervatum Hislop & A.J.G.Wilson

= Styphelia acervata =

Species of plant

Styphelia acervata is a species of flowering plant in the heath family Ericaceae and is endemic to the south-west of Western Australia. It is a dense, prostrate, mat-forming shrub with erect, narrowly egg-shaped leaves, and cream-coloured and greenish tube-shaped flowers.

== Description ==
Styphelia acervata is a dense, prostrate, mat-forming shrub that typically grows up to about 0.15 m (5.9 in) high and 1.2 m (3 ft 11 in) wide, its young branchlets hairy. The leaves are erect, narrowly egg-shaped with the narrower end towards the base, 10–17 mm (0.39–0.67 in) long and 1.8–3.3 mm (0.071–0.130 in) wide on a glabrous petiole about 0.5–1 mm (0.020–0.039 in) long. The leaves are glabrous and the lower surface is a paler shade of green. The flowers are erect and borne singly in leaf axils, with elliptic to round bracts 1.6–2.4 mm (0.063–0.094 in) long wide, and egg-shaped to elliptic bracteoles 2.3–3.4 mm (0.091–0.134 in) long at the base. The sepals are narrowly egg-shaped, 5.0–6.7 mm (0.20–0.26 in) long and the petals cream-coloured and greenish, forming a tube 10.4–14.5–14.5 mm (0.41–0.57–0.57 in) long with lobes 3.6–6.0 mm (0.14–0.24 in) long and hairy on the inside. Flowering mainly occurs from July to September and the fruit is elliptic to spherical, 5.5–8.0 mm (0.22–0.31 in) long.

== Taxonomy ==
This species was first formally described in 2013 by Michael Clyde Hislop and Annette Jane Gratton Wilson who gave it the name Astroloma acervatum in the journal Nuytsia from specimens collected by Hislop near Quindanning in 2010. In 2020, Hislop, Darren M. Crayn and Caroline Puente-Lelievre transferred the species to Styphelia as S. acervata in Australian Systematic Botany. The specific epithet (acervata) means "mounded" or "heaped", referring to the habit of this species.

== Distribution and habitat ==
This styphelia grows in sandy soil in open sites in woodland, from near Beverley to near Pingelly in the Avon Wheatbelt and Jarrah Forest bioregions of south-western Western Australia.
