= Styphelia pentapogona =

Scientific classification
- Kingdom: Plantae
- Clade: Tracheophytes
- Clade: Angiosperms
- Clade: Eudicots
- Clade: Asterids
- Order: Ericales
- Family: Ericaceae
- Genus: Styphelia
- Species: S. pentapogona

Binomial name
- Styphelia pentapogona F.Muell.

Synonyms
- Astroloma juniperinum F.Muell.; Astroloma microphyllum Stschegl.; Styphelia parvulifolia Sleumer

Species of plant

Styphelia pentapogona is a species of flowering plant in the heath family Ericaceae and is endemic to the south-west of Western Australia. It is a diffuse shrub with many erect or ascending branchlets, crowded egg-shaped or lance-shaped leaves about 2.0–2.5 mm (0.079–0.098 in) long, with a small point on the tip. The flowers are borne in lower leaf axils and are sessile with very small bracts and bracteoles less than 2 mm (0.079 in) long at the base. The petals are joined at the base forming a tube about 6.5 mm (0.26 in) long with bearded lobes.

Styphelia pentapogona was first formally described in 1867 by Ferdinand von Mueller in his Fragmenta phytographiae Australiae from specimens collected by George Maxwell.

This styphelia is found in the Esperance Plains and Mallee bioregions of south-western Western Australia and is listed as "not threatened".
