= Brachyloma baxteri =

Scientific classification
- Kingdom: Plantae
- Clade: Tracheophytes
- Clade: Angiosperms
- Clade: Eudicots
- Clade: Asterids
- Order: Ericales
- Family: Ericaceae
- Genus: Brachyloma
- Species: B. baxteri

Binomial name
- Brachyloma baxteri (A.Cunn. ex DC.) Puente-Lel.

Synonyms
- Astroloma baxteri A.Cunn. ex DC.; Cyathodes squamuligera F.Muell. nom. inval., pro syn.; Cyathodes squamuligera B.D.Jacks. nom. inval., pro syn.; Stenanthera squamuligera F.Muell.; Styphelia baxteri (A.Cunn. ex DC.) F.Muell.

Species of plant

Brachyloma baxteri is a species of flowering plant in the family Ericaceae and is endemic to the south-west of Western Australia. It is an erect or diffuse shrub with linear leaves and red, tube-shaped flowers.

== Description ==
Brachyloma baxteri is an erect or diffuse shrub that usually grows to a height of 0.7–1 m (2 ft 4 in – 3 ft 3 in) and has softly-hairy branchlets. The leaves are linear, up to 12 mm (0.47 in) long, with the edges curved downwards and a small hard point on the tip. The flowers are sessile with bracts up to 2 mm (0.079 in) long and bracteoles nearly 4 mm (0.16 in) long at the base. The petals are joined to form a red tube 12 mm (0.47 in) long with erect, glabrous, linear lobes about 6 mm (0.24 in) long. The fruit is a spherical drupe that is shorter than the sepals.

== Taxonomy and naming ==
This species was first formally described 1839 by Augustin Pyramus de Candolle from an unpublished description by Allan Cunningham who gave it the name Astroloma baxteri. De Candolle's description was published in Prodromus Systematis Naturalis Regni Vegetabilis. In 2016, Caroline Puente-Lelievre changed the name to Brachyloma baxteri in Australian Systematic Botany. The specific epithet (baxteri) honours the plant collector William Baxter.

== Distribution ==
Brachyloma baxteri occurs in the Avon Wheatbelt, Esperance Plains, Jarrah Forest and Warren bioregions of south-western Western Australia.
