= Styphelia tecta =

Scientific classification
- Kingdom: Plantae
- Clade: Tracheophytes
- Clade: Angiosperms
- Clade: Eudicots
- Clade: Asterids
- Order: Ericales
- Family: Ericaceae
- Genus: Styphelia
- Species: S. tecta

Binomial name
- Styphelia tecta (R.Br.) Spreng.

Synonyms
- Astroloma tectum R.Br.; Astroloma latifolium Sond.; Styphelia platyphylla F.Muell.

Species of shrub

Styphelia tecta is a species of flowering plant in the heath family Ericaceae and is endemic to the south of Western Australia. It is a shrub with egg-shaped to broadly lance-shaped leaves and white, tube-shaped flowers with bearded lobes.

== Description ==
Styphelia tecta is a shrub that typically grows up to 30 cm (12 in) high and has a thick, woody trunk has many thick stems. The leaves are egg-shaped to broadly lance-shaped, almost overlapping, 13–19 mm (0.51–0.75 in) long with a short, sharply-pointed tip. The flowers are scarcely longer than the leaves, with bracteoles nearly 4 mm (0.16 in) long at the base. The sepals are 8.5–11 mm (0.33–0.43 in) long, and the petals are white, 13–15 mm (0.51–0.59 in) long and joined at the base forming a tube with bearded lobes.

== Taxonomy ==
This species was first formally described in 1810 by Robert Brown who gave it the name Astroloma tectum in his Prodromus Florae Novae Hollandiae et Insulae Van Diemen. In 1824, Kurt Polycarp Joachim Sprengel transferred the species to Styphelia as S. tecta. The specific epithet (tecta) means "hidden" or "concealed", referring to the inconspicuous flowers.

== Distribution ==
This species grows in the Esperance Plains, Jarrah Forest and Mallee bioregions of southern Western Australia.

== Conservation status ==
Styphelia striata is listed as "not threatened" by the Government of Western Australia Department of Biodiversity, Conservation and Attractions.
