= Styphelia oblongifolia =

Scientific classification
- Kingdom: Plantae
- Clade: Tracheophytes
- Clade: Angiosperms
- Clade: Eudicots
- Clade: Asterids
- Order: Ericales
- Family: Ericaceae
- Genus: Styphelia
- Species: S. oblongifolia

Binomial name
- Styphelia oblongifolia (A.J.G.Wilson & Hislop) Hislop, Crayn & Puente-Lel.

Synonyms
- Astroloma oblongifolium A.J.G.Wilson & Hislop

Species of shrub

Styphelia oblongifolia is a species of flowering plant in the heath family Ericaceae and is endemic to the south-west of Western Australia. It is an open or straggling shrub with erect, narrowly oblong leaves and pale yellow, tube-shaped flowers.

== Description ==
Styphelia oblongifolia is an open or straggling to erect shrub that typically grows to a height of 30 cm (12 in), its young branchlets densely covered with white hairs. The leaves are crowded, erect, narrowly oblong to narrowly egg-shaped with the narrower end towards the base, sharply-pointed, 5–18 mm (0.20–0.71 in) long and 2–4 mm (0.079–0.157 in) wide and more or less glabrous. The lower surface of the leaves is a paler shade of green and the edges are rolled down to almost rolled under. The flowers are pale yellow, arranged singly in upper leaf axils with a broadly egg-shaped, glabrous bracteole 2.6–4.5 mm (0.10–0.18 in) long and 2.5–3.5 mm (0.098–0.138 in) wide. The sepals are broadly egg-shaped, 5.5–10.5 mm (0.22–0.41 in) long and 2.6–3.7 mm (0.10–0.15 in) wide, pale yellow and hairy on the lower surface. The petals are joined at the base, forming a tube 6.0–9.5 mm (0.24–0.37 in) long, the lobes shorter than the petal tube. The style is 8.5–12 mm (0.33–0.47 in) long. Flowering mainly occurs in May and the fruit is elliptic about 5.5–6.5 mm (0.22–0.26 in) long and 3–4 mm (0.12–0.16 in) wide.

== Taxonomy ==
This species was first formally described in 2013 by Annette Jane Gratton Wilson and Michael Clyde Hislop who gave it the name Astroloma oblongifolia in the journal Nuytsia from specimens collected by Hislop in the South Eneabba Nature Reserve in 2010. In 2020, Hislop, Darren Crayn and Caroline Puente-Lelievre transferred A. oblongifolium to Styphelia as S. oblongifolium in the journal Australian Systematic Botany. The specific epithet (oblongifolium) means "oblong-leaved".

== Distribution ==
This species occurs in the Geraldton Sandplains, Jarrah Forest and Swan Coastal Plain bioregions of south-western Western Australia.

== Conservation status ==
Styphelia oblongifolia is listed as "not threatened" by the Western Australian Government Department of Biodiversity, Conservation and Attractions.
