= Styphelia compacta =

Scientific classification
- Kingdom: Plantae
- Clade: Tracheophytes
- Clade: Angiosperms
- Clade: Eudicots
- Clade: Asterids
- Order: Ericales
- Family: Ericaceae
- Genus: Styphelia
- Species: S. compacta

Binomial name
- Styphelia compacta (R.Br.) Spreng.

Species of plant

Styphelia compacta is a species of flowering plant in the heath family Ericaceae and is endemic to the south-west of Western Australia. It is a widely spreading or prostrate, much-branched shrub with egg-shaped leaves or lance-shaped leaves with the narrower end towards the base, and red flowers arranged in leaf axils.

== Description ==
Styphelia compacta is a widely spreading or prostrate shrub with egg-shaped or lance-shaped leaves with the narrower end towards the base, 6.5–8.5 mm (0.26–0.33 in) long on a more or less distinct petiole. The leaves are flat or curved downwards and convex at the end, and sometimes wavy. The flowers are red, arranged in leaf axils or at the base of side-shoots on a pedicel up to 6 mm (0.24 in) long with bracteoles 2 mm (0.079 in) long. The sepals are 6.5 mm (0.26 in) long with a small point on the tip, the petals forming a tube up to twice the length of the sepals, with lobes densely bearded on the inside.

== Taxonomy ==
Styphelia compacta was first formally described in 1810 by Robert Brown who gave it the name Astroloma compactum in his Prodromus Florae Novae Hollandiae et Insulae Van Diemen. In 1824, Kurt Polycarp Joachim Sprengel transferred the species to Styphelia as S. compacta in Systema Vegetabilium. The specific epithet (compacta) means "united" or "compact".

== Distribution ==
This styphelia occurs in the Avon Wheatbelt, Esperance Plains, Jarrah Forest, Mallee and Warren bioregions of south-western Western Australia.

== Conservation status ==
Styphelia compacta is listed as "not threatened" by the Western Australian Government Department of Biodiversity, Conservation and Attractions.
