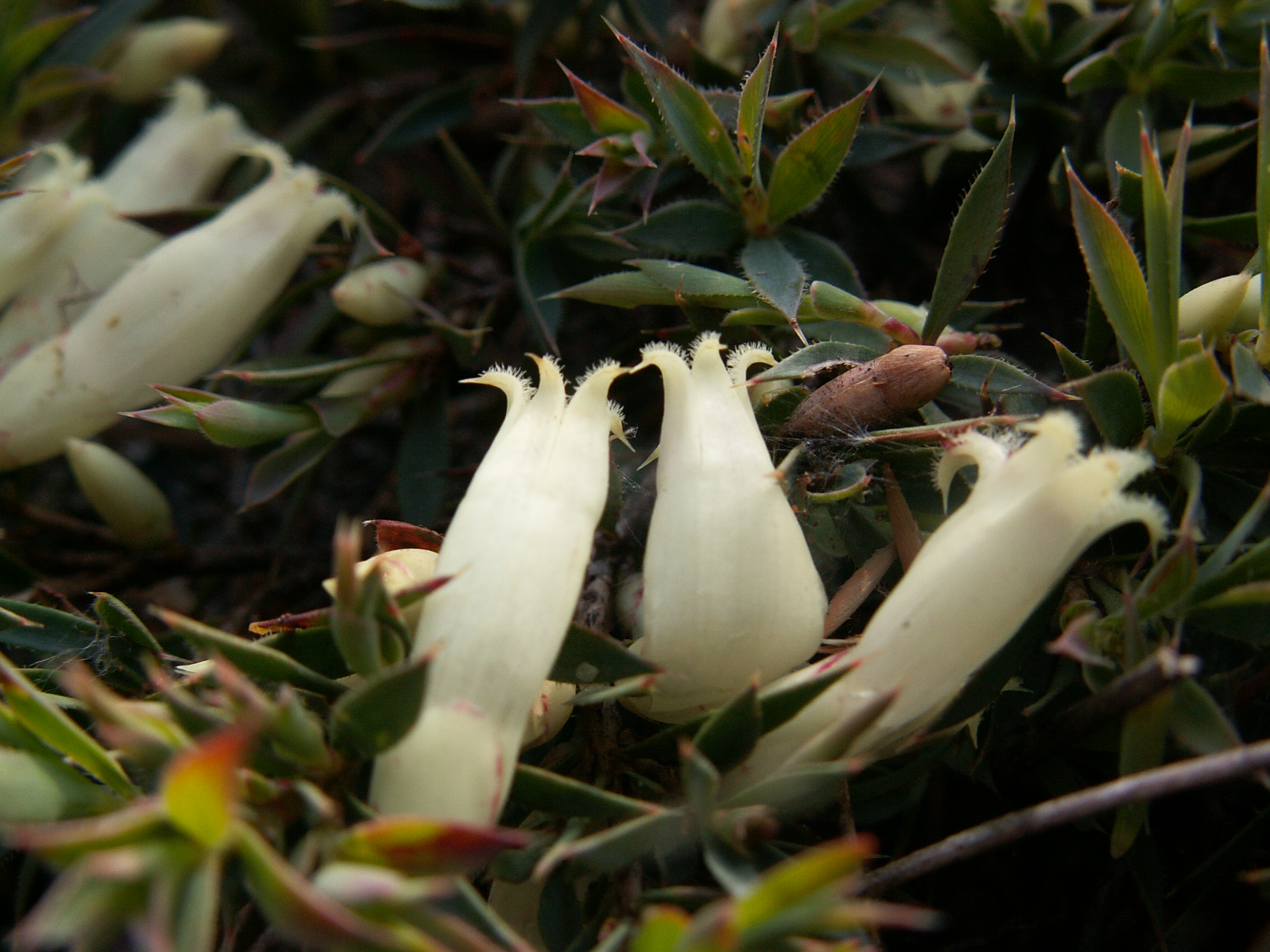
- Styphelia pallida on the Darling Range

Scientific classification
- Kingdom: Plantae
- Clade: Tracheophytes
- Clade: Angiosperms
- Clade: Eudicots
- Clade: Asterids
- Order: Ericales
- Family: Ericaceae
- Genus: Styphelia
- Species: S. pallida

Binomial name
- Styphelia pallida (R.Br.) Spreng.

Synonyms
- Astroloma pallidum R.Br.; Astroloma pallidum var. suberectum Sond.; Leucopogon blepharodes DC.

= Styphelia pallida =

Kick bush

Species of flowering plant

Styphelia pallida, commonly known as kick bush, is usually a small, compact shrub in the family Ericaceae. The species is endemic to south-western Western Australia.

== Description ==
Styphelia pallida is usually a neat, dense, compact shrub but sometimes a diffuse to erect shrub to about 30 cm high. The leaves are lance-shaped, about 10 mm (0.39 in) long with toothed margins. Creamy white to pale yellow (rarely pink or red) tubular flowers are present in the axils of leaves for most of the year.

== Taxonomy and naming ==
This species was first described in 1810 by Robert Brown who gave it the name in Astroloma pallidum in his Prodromus Florae Novae Hollandiae. In 1824, Kurt Polycarp Joachim Sprengel transferred the species to Styphelia as S. pallida. The specific epithet (pallidum) is a Latin word meaning "pale" or "wan".

== Distribution and habitat ==
Kick bush grows on yellow/grey sand, red/brown laterite gravel, brown clay to sandy clay, ironstone and limestone in a variety of habitats including flats, hillslopes, winter-wet sites and the edges of lakes in the Avon Wheatbelt, Esperance Plains, Geraldton Sandplains, Jarrah Forest, Mallee, Swan Coastal Plain and Warren biogeographical regions of Western Australia.

== Use in horticulture ==
This species is not known in cultivation, partly because good cutting wood is difficult to obtain.
