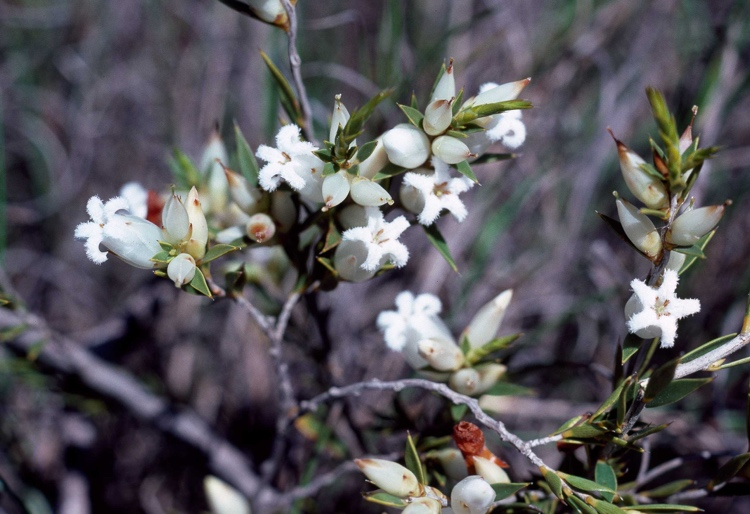
- Near Mogumber

Scientific classification
- Kingdom: Plantae
- Clade: Tracheophytes
- Clade: Angiosperms
- Clade: Eudicots
- Clade: Asterids
- Order: Ericales
- Family: Ericaceae
- Genus: Styphelia
- Species: S. xerophylla

Binomial name
- Styphelia xerophylla (DC.) F.Muell.

Synonyms
- Astroloma xerophyllum (DC.) Sond.; Stomarrhena xerophylla DC.

= Styphelia xerophylla =

Species of flowering plants

Styphelia xerophylla is a species of flowering plant in the heath family Ericaceae and is endemic to the south-west of Western Australia. It is an erect, compact shrub with egg-shaped to narrowly egg-shaped leaves and white, tube-shaped flowers with hairy lobes.

== Description ==
Styphelia xerophylla is an erect, compact shrub that typically grows up to 60 cm (24 in) high and wide, with hairy branchlets from near the base of the plant. The leaves are narrowly egg-shaped to egg-shaped with the narrower end towards the base, 5–20 mm (0.20–0.79 in) long and 1.6–3.8 mm (0.063–0.150 in) wide, with a sharply pointed tip. The flowers are born singly in leaf axils, with bracts 1.8–2.8 mm (0.071–0.110 in) and bracteoles 3.0–4.2 mm (0.12–0.17 in) long at the base. The sepals are 7.5–9.0 mm (0.30–0.35 in) long and 3.0–4.3 mm (0.12–0.17 in) wide. The petals are white, joined at the base forming a tube 6.0–8.2 mm (0.24–0.32 in) long and with lobes that are shorter than the tube, 4.0–5.2 mm (0.16–0.20 in) long and densely hairy.

== Taxonomy ==
This species was first formally described in 1839 by Augustin Pyramus de Candolle who gave it the name Stomarrhena xerophylla in his Prodromus Systematis Naturalis Regni Vegetabilis from specimens collected near the Swan River Colony by James Drummond. In 1867, Ferdinand von Mueller transferred the species to Styphelia as S. xerophylla in his Fragmenta Phytographiae Australiae. The specific epithet (xerophylla) means "dry-" or "parched-leaved".

== Distribution and habitat ==
This species mostly grows in sandy soils in Banksia woodland or heathland in the Avon Wheatbelt, Geraldton Sandplains, Jarrah Forest and Swan Coastal Plain bioregions of south-western Western Australia.

== Conservation status ==
Styphelia xerophylla is listed as "not threatened" by the Government of Western Australia Department of Biodiversity, Conservation and Attractions.
