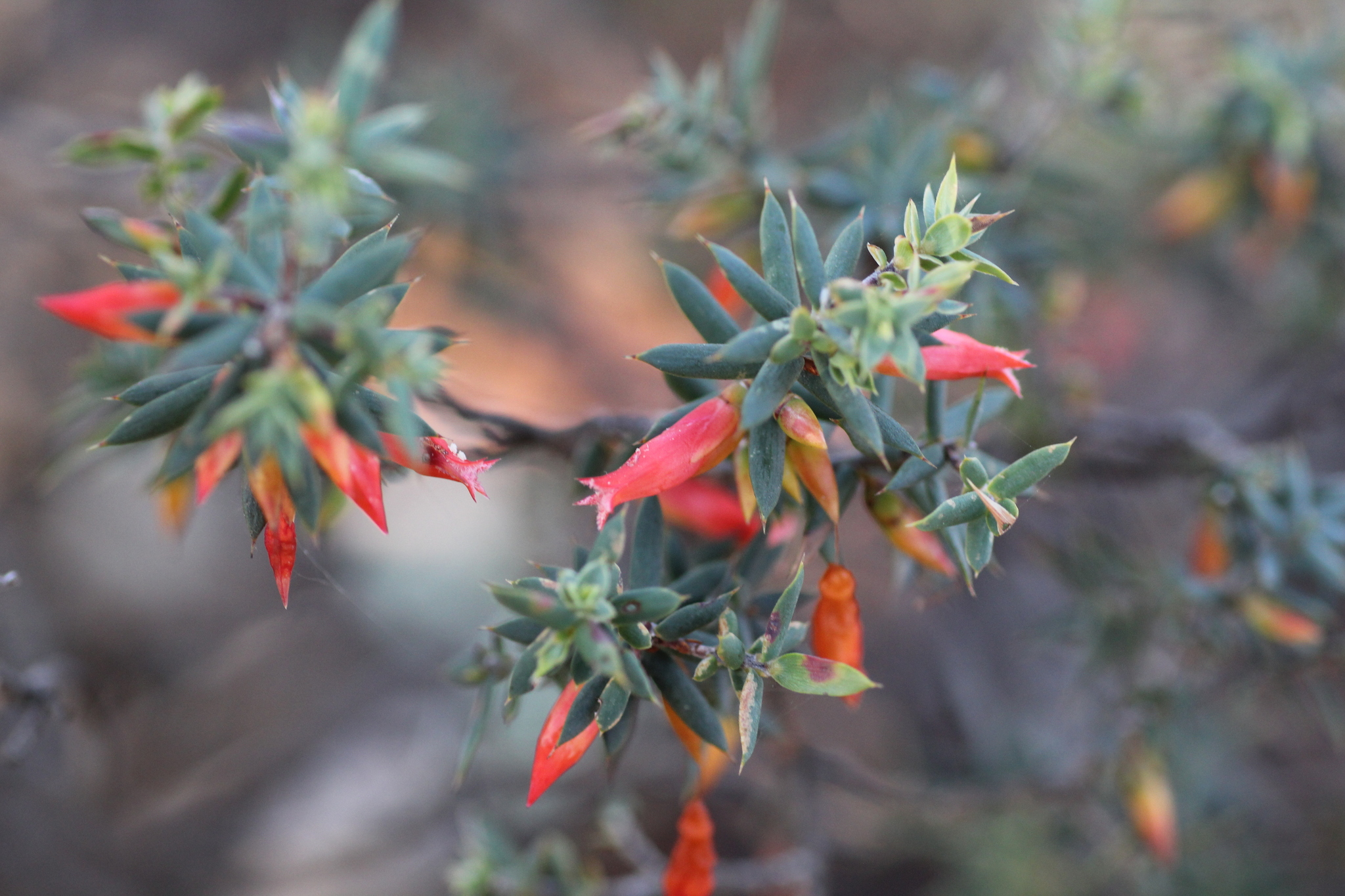
- Near Dryandra Woodland

Scientific classification
- Kingdom: Plantae
- Clade: Tracheophytes
- Clade: Angiosperms
- Clade: Eudicots
- Clade: Asterids
- Order: Ericales
- Family: Ericaceae
- Genus: Styphelia
- Species: S. epacridis

Binomial name
- Styphelia epacridis (DC.) F.Muell.

Synonyms
- Astroloma divaricatum Sond. nom. illeg.; Astroloma epacridis (DC.) Druce; Leucopogon epacridis DC.; Astroloma drummondii Sond.; Astroloma pungens Stschegl.; Astroloma splendens Planch.; Cyathodes baxteri A.Cunn. ex DC.; Styphelia drummondii (Sond.) F.Muell.; Styphelia splendens (Planch.) Planch.

= Styphelia epacridis =

Species of flowering plant

Styphelia epacridis is a flowering plant in the family Ericaceae and is endemic to the south-west of Western Australia. It is a straggling shrub with lance-shaped or linear leaves with a sharp point on the tip, and red, tube-shaped flowers arranged singly in leaf axils.

== Description ==
Styphelia epacridis is a straggling shrub that typically grows up to a height of 0.3–0.6 m (1 ft 0 in – 2 ft 0 in) and has softly-hairy branchlets. The leaves are lance-shaped or linear, up to about 6 mm (0.24 in) long, with the edges rolled under and a sharp, rigid point on the tip. The flowers are arranged singly in leaf axils with bracteoles about 1 mm (0.039 in) long at the base. The sepals are 6.5–8.5 mm (0.26–0.33 in) long and the petals red and joined at the base to form a tube slightly longer than the sepals with lobes about 5.5 mm (0.22 in) long and bearded.

== Taxonomy ==
This species was first described in 1839 by Augustin Pyramus de Candolle who gave it the name Leucopogon epacridis in his Prodromus Systematis Naturalis Regni Vegetabilis from specimens collected by James Drummond near the Swan River Colony. In 1867 Ferdinand von Mueller transferred it to the genus Styphelia as S. conostephioides in his Fragmenta Phytographiae Australiae.

== Distribution ==
Styphelia epacridis is found in the Avon Wheatbelt, Coolgardie, Esperance Plains, Jarrah Forest, Mallee and Warren bioregions of south-western Western Australia.
