= Styphelia chlorantha =

Conservation status
- Priority Two — Poorly Known Taxa (DEC)

Scientific classification
- Kingdom: Plantae
- Clade: Tracheophytes
- Clade: Angiosperms
- Clade: Eudicots
- Clade: Asterids
- Order: Ericales
- Family: Ericaceae
- Genus: Styphelia
- Species: S. chlorantha

Binomial name
- Styphelia chlorantha (Hislop & A.J.G.Wilson) Hislop, Crayn & Puente-Lel.

Synonyms
- Astroloma chloranthum Hislop & A.J.G.Wilson

Species of plant

Styphelia chlorantha is a species of flowering plant in the heath family Ericaceae and is endemic to a small area of Western Australia. It is a low, spreading shrub with erect, narrowly egg-shaped to egg-shaped leaves with the narrower end towards the base, and green, tube-shaped flowers arranged singly in leaf axils.

== Description ==
Styphelia chlorantha is a low, spreading shrub that typically grows up to 0.1 m (3.9 in) high and 1 m (3 ft 3 in) wide, its young branchlets sparsely hairy. The leaves are directed upwards and are narrowly egg-shaped to egg-shaped with the narrower end towards the base, 7.8–13.5 mm (0.31–0.53 in) long and 1.8–3.6 mm (0.071–0.142 in) wide on a petiole up to 0.8 mm (0.031 in) long. There is a sharp point on the end of the leaves and the both surface are more or less glabrous. The flowers are arranged singly in leaf axils with elliptic to more or less round bracts 1.3–2.2 mm (0.051–0.087 in) long and broadly elliptic bracteoles 1.7–2.3 mm (0.067–0.091 in) long and 1.5–1.9 mm (0.059–0.075 in) long at the base. The sepals are egg-shaped or narrowly egg-shaped, 4.0–4.8 mm (0.16–0.19 in) long and 1.6–2.1 mm (0.063–0.083 in) wide, the petals forming a green, cylindrical or narrowly bell-shaped tube 6.6–10.1 mm (0.26–0.40 in) long with lobes 3.4–4.0 mm (0.13–0.16 in) long. Flowering depends on rainfall but typically occurs from April to June and the fruit is elliptic to spherical, 4.8–5.2 mm (0.19–0.20 in) long and 3.9–4.8 mm (0.15–0.19 in) wide.

== Taxonomy ==
This species was first formally described in 2013 by Michael Clyde Hislop and Annette Jane Gratton Wilson who gave it the name Astroloma chloranthum in the journal Nuytsia from specimens collected by Hislop near Newdegate in 2006. In 2020, Hislop, Darren M. Crayn and Caroline Puente-Lelievre changed the name to Styphelia chlorantha in Australian Systematic Botany The specific epithet (chlorantha) means "green-flowered".

== Distribution and habitat ==
This styphelia grows in mallee in a small area between Newdegate and Pingrup in the Mallee bioregion of south-western Western Australia.

== Conservation status ==
Styphelia chlorantha is listed as "Priority Two" by the Western Australian Government Department of Biodiversity, Conservation and Attractions, meaning that it is poorly known and from only one or a few locations.
