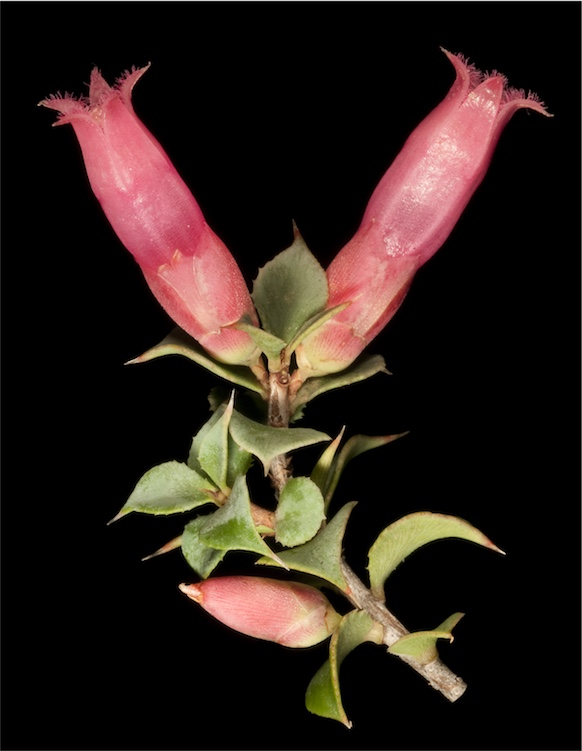
- Styphelia serratifolia near Corrigin

Scientific classification
- Kingdom: Plantae
- Clade: Tracheophytes
- Clade: Angiosperms
- Clade: Eudicots
- Clade: Asterids
- Order: Ericales
- Family: Ericaceae
- Genus: Styphelia
- Species: S. serratifolia

Binomial name
- Styphelia serratifolia (DC.) Hislop, Crayn & Puente-Lel.

Synonyms
- List: Astroloma candolleanum Sond. nom. illeg.; Astroloma serratifolium (DC.) Sond.; Stomarrhena serratifolia DC.; Astroloma candolleanum var. horridulum E.Pritz.; Astroloma candolleanum var. placidum E.Pritz.; Styphelia candolleana F.Muell.

= Styphelia serratifolia =

Species of shrub

Styphelia serratifolia is a species of flowering plant in the heath family Ericaceae and is endemic to the south-west of Western Australia. It is an erect, bushy shrub, with broadly egg-shaped leaves with the narrower end towards the base, and red, tube-shaped flowers arranged singly in leaf axils.

== Description ==
Styphelia serratifolia is an erect, bushy shrub that typically grows to a height of 30–60 cm (12–24 in), and has more or less glabrous branchlets. The leaves are broadly egg-shaped with the narrower end towards the base, or broadly lance-shaped, less than 12 mm (0.47 in) long and sharply-pointed. The flowers are arranged singly in leaf axils on a peduncle up to 2 mm (0.079 in) long, with bracteoles 2–3 mm (0.079–0.118 in) long at the base. The sepals are about 6.5 mm (0.26 in) long, the petals red and joined at the base to form a tube 8.6–11 mm (0.34–0.43 in) long with lobes 4.0–5.4 mm (0.16–0.21 in) long and bearded.

== Taxonomy ==
This species was first formally described in 1839 by Augustin Pyramus de Candolle who gave it the name Stomarrhena serratifolia in his Prodromus Systematis Naturalis Regni Vegetabilis, from specimens collected near the Swan River Colony by James Drummond. In 2020, Michael Hislop, Darren Crayn and Caroline Puente-Lelievre transferred the species to Styphelia as S. serratifolia in Australian Systematic Botany. The specific epithet (serratifolia) means "serrated leaves".

== Distribution ==
Styphelia serratifolia is widespread in the Avon Wheatbelt, Coolgardie, Esperance Plains, Geraldton Sandplains, Jarrah Forest, Mallee, Swan Coastal Plain and Yalgoo bioregions of south-western Western Australia.
