= Plantae Preissianae =

Botanical book by Johann Georg Christian Lehmann

Plantae preissianae sive enumeratio plantarum quas in australasia occidentali et meridionali-occidentali annis 1838–1841 collegit Ludovicus Preiss, more commonly known as Plantae preissianae, is a book written by Johann Georg Christian Lehmann and Ludwig Preiss.

Written in Latin, it is composed of two volumes and was first published by Sumptibus Meissneri in Hamburg between 1844 and 1847. The two volumes were published in six separate parts.

The books detail the plants collected by Ludwig Preiss, James Drummond, Thomas Livingstone Mitchell and Johann Lhotsky in Western Australia. The books are regarded as one of the earliest and most important contributions to the study of the flora of Western Australia. Priess amassed a collection of over 2,700 species of plants while in Western Australia from 1838 to 1842 when he returned to Germany. As a result of Priess' samples and notes Lehmann and his team of botanists, Stephan Endlicher, Christian Gottfried Daniel Nees von Esenbeck, Gustav Kunze, Carl Meissner, Friedrich Gottlieb Bartling, Johannes Conrad Schauer, Friedrich Anton Wilhelm Miquel and Ernst Gottlieb von Steudel, were able to study and name the plants in the next five years.
