= Systematic Census of Australian Plants =

Book on botany by Ferdinand von Mueller

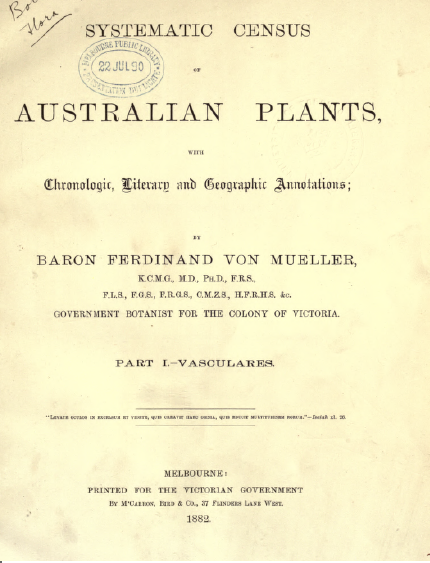
The title page of the census

The Systematic census of Australian plants, with chronologic, literary and geographic annotations, more commonly known as the Systematic Census of Australian Plants, also known by its standard botanic abbreviation Syst. Census Austral. Pl., is a survey of the vascular flora of Australia prepared by Government botanist for the state of Victoria Ferdinand von Mueller and published in 1882.

Von Mueller describes the development of the census in the preface of the volume as an extension of the seven volumes of the Flora Australiensis written by George Bentham. A new flora was necessary since as more areas of Australia were explored and settled, the flora of the island-continent became better collected and described. The first census increased the number of described species from the 8125 in Flora Australiensis to 8646. The book records all the known species indigenous to Australia and Norfolk Island; with records of species distribution.

Von Mueller noted that by 1882 it had become difficult to distinguish some introduced species from native ones:

The lines of demarkation between truly indigenous and more recently immigrated plants can no longer in all cases be drawn with precision; but whereas Alchemilla vulgaris and Veronica serpyllifolia were found along with several European Carices in untrodden parts of the Australian Alps during the author's earliest explorations, Alchemilla arvensis and Veronica peregrina were at first only noticed near settlements. The occurrence of Arabis glabra, Geum urbanum, Agiimonia eupatoria, Eupatorium cannabinum, Cavpesium cernuum and some others may therefore readily be disputed as indigenous, and some questions concerning the nativity of various of our plants will probably remain for ever involved in doubts.

In 1889 an updated edition of the census was published, the Second Systematic Census increased the number of described species to 8839. Von Mueller dedicated both works to Joseph Dalton Hooker and Augustin Pyramus de Candolle.

The work is of historic significance as the first Australian flora written in Australia. Following its publication, research and writing on the flora of Australia has largely been carried out in Australia.

== See also ==
- Australian Bird Count (ABC)
- Flora of Australia (series) (59-volume series)
