= Sydney Sandstone Ridgetop Woodland =

Indigenous forest communities of Sydney, Australia

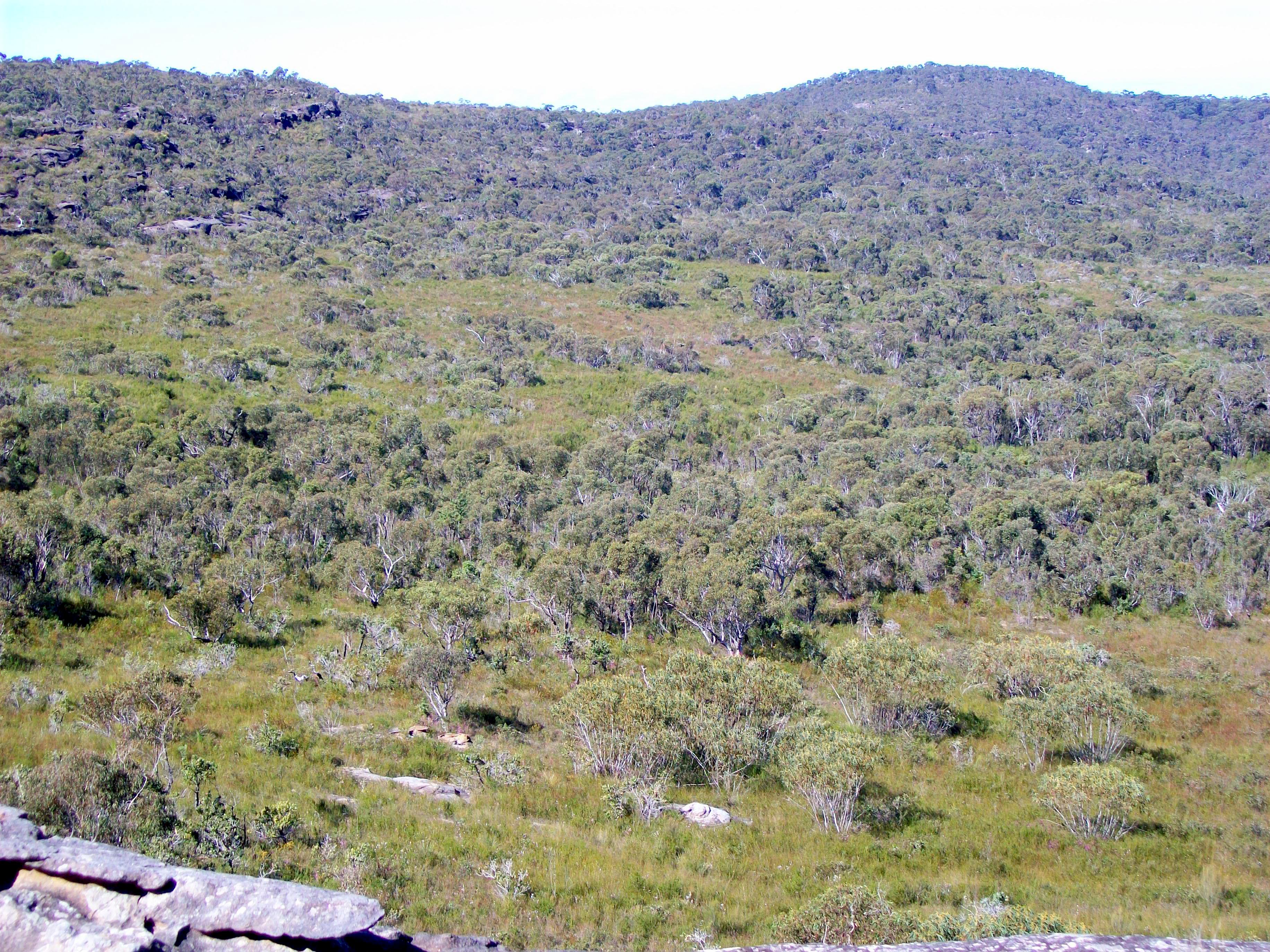
- Yellow-top mallee ash growing at Ku-ring-gai Chase National Park.

Ecology
- Realm: Australasia
- Biome: Temperate grasslands, savannas, and shrublands
- Borders: Blue Mountains and Southern Highlands Basalt Forests; Blue Gum High Forest

Geography
- Country: Australia
- Elevation: 300–600 metres (980–1,970 ft)
- Coordinates: 33°37′5.45″S 151°15′30.82″E
- Geology: Sandstone, shale
- Climate type: Humid subtropical climate (Cfa)
- Soil types: Clay, sand (podsol), loam

The Sydney Sandstone Ridgetop Woodland, also known as Coastal Sandstone Ridgetop Woodland and Hornsby Enriched Sandstone Exposed Woodland, is a shrubby woodland and mallee community situated in northern parts of Sydney, Australia, where it is found predominantly on ridgetops and slopes of the Hornsby Plateau, Woronora Plateau and the lower Blue Mountains area. It is an area of high biodiversity, existing on poor sandstone soils, with regular wildfires, and moderate rainfall.

== Geography ==
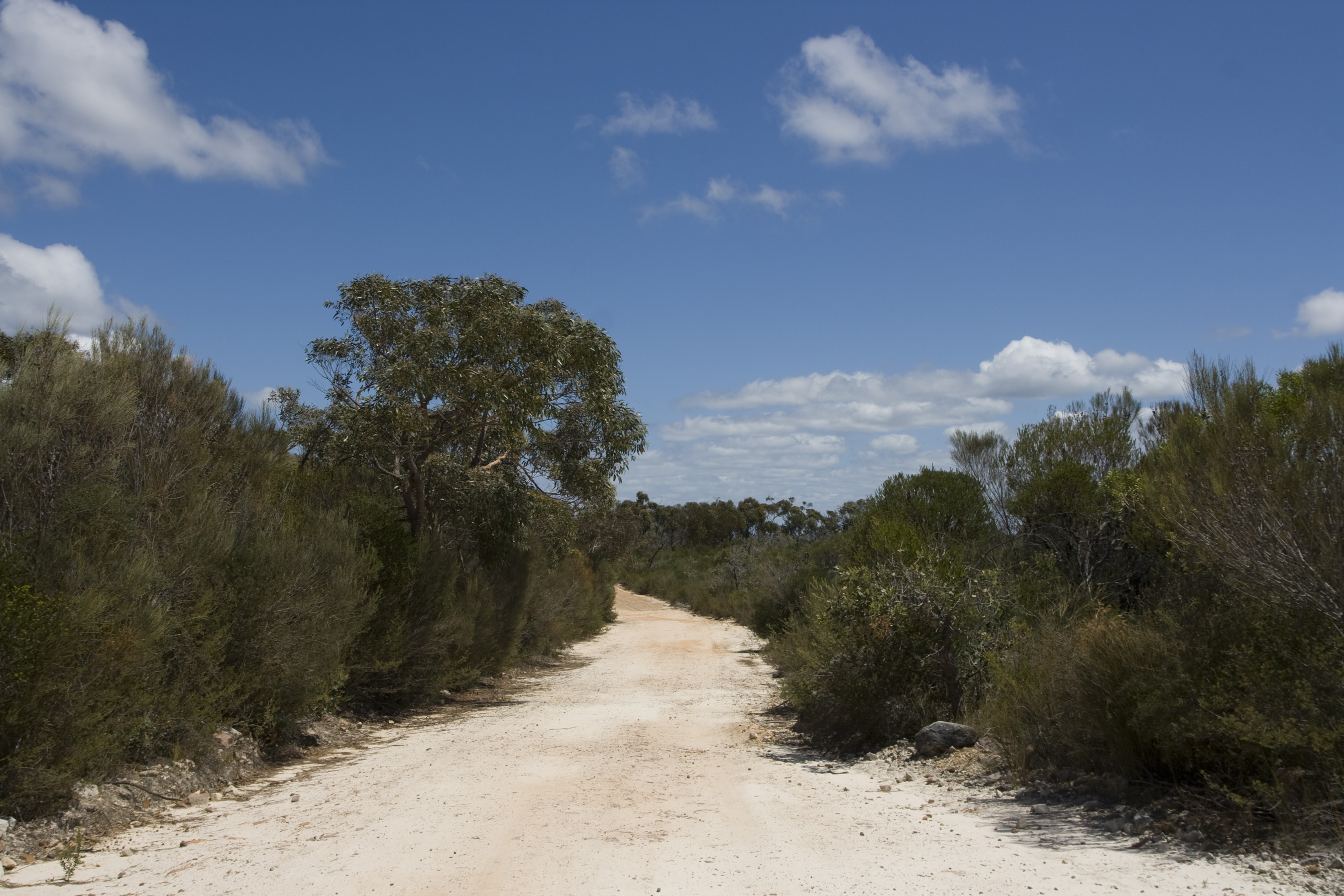
Walk track within scrubby formation

The Ridgetop Woodland is a low eucalypt forest having a diverse sclerophyll shrub layer, mallees and open groundcover of sedges that sit on the Triassic Hawkesbury sandstone plateaux, which encircle the Sydney Basin. The community is found in areas where the average annual rainfall ranges from 850mm to 1650mm. Ridgetop Woodland is a distinctive component of the Sydney landscape, recognised for its prominent visibility and scenic characteristics, including the knotted forms of stunted trees, the reflective tones of smooth bark, and the distinctive shapes of heathland flora.

Vegetation mapping of the Cumberland Plain conducted by NSW National Parks and Wildlife Service (2002) indicates that the study area contains Sandstone Ridgetop Woodland. Around one-quarter of this community has been cleared for urban development, though many areas still remain in conservation reserves. 75-90% of the vegetation zone remains.

=== Scope ===
It incorporates Coastal Sandstone Ridgetop Woodland, which is found up to 600m above sea level in areas receiving an average annual rainfall ranging from 850 to 1650 mm. It then grades into heath (e.g. Coastal Sandstone Plateau Heath) where soils become more shallow.

In the upper Blue Mountains it is supplanted by Blue Mountains Ridgetop Woodland on the more raised Narrabeen Sandstone, on sandy loams, where there it will grade into the Blue Mountains and Southern Highlands Basalt Forests further west. Coastal Sand plain Heath occurs at Wottamolla, Royal National Park.

== Flora ==
The area is dominated by Corymbia eximia and Eucalyptus sieberi, which shape a sporadic overstorey enclosed with large shrubs such as Banksia serrata, Leptospermum trinervium and Hakea dactyloides. Smaller shrubs including Leucopogon setiger and Dillwynia floribunda are salient towards the edge of the rock shelf.

Selected plant species of Sydney Sandstone Ridgetop Woodland
Common name	Botanical name	Approx. height	Plantnet
Tree species
Narrow-leaved Apple	Angophora bakeri	to 6 metres	details
Sydney red gum	Angophora costata	to 15 metres	details
Yellow bloodwood	Corymbia eximia	to 15 metres	details
Red bloodwood	Corymbia gummifera	to 15 metres	details
Scribbly Gum	Eucalyptus haemastoma	to 12 metres	details
Dwarf Apple	Angophora hispida	to 5 metres	details
Sydney peppermint	Eucalyptus piperita	to 15 metres	details
Scribbly Gum	Eucalyptus racemosa	to 15 metres	details
Scalybark	Eucalyptus squamosa	to 15 metres	details
Stringybark	Eucalyptus oblonga	to 12 metres	details
Grey gum	Eucalyptus punctata	to 15 metres	details
Stringybark	Eucalyptus oblonga	to 15 metres	details
Narrow-leaved Stringybark	Eucalyptus sparsifolia	to 15 metres	details
Sunshine wattle	Acacia terminalis	to 6 metres	details
Black she-oak	Allocasuarina littoralis	to 6 metres	details
Old man banksia	Banksia serrata	to 8 metres	details
Silver banksia	Banksia marginata	to 8 metres	details
She-oak	Allocasuarina distyla	to 4 metres	details
Shrub species
Sweet scented wattle	Acacia suaveolens	to 2.5 metres	details
Heath banksia	Banksia ericifolia	to 5 metres	details
Hairpin banksia	Banksia spinulosa	to 3 metres	details
Sydney boronia	Boronia ledifolia	to 1.5 metres	details
Bossiaea	Bossiaea rhombifolia	to 2 metres	details
Bossiaea	Bossiaea lenticularis	to 1 metre	details
Long Leaf Smokebush	Conospermum longifolium	to 2 metres	details
Eggs and Bacon	Dillwynia retorta	to 3 metres	details
Wedge pea	Gompholobium grandiflorum	to 1 metre	details
Red spider flower	Grevillea speciosa	to 3 metres	details
Tea tree	Leptospermum trinervium	to 4 metres	details
Pink kunzea	Kunzea capitata	to 2 metres	details
Mountain devil	Lambertia formosa	to 2 metres	details
Red rusty petals	Lasiopetalum rufum	to 1 metre	details
Phebalium	Phebalium squamulosum	to 7 metres	details
Crinkle bush	Lomatia silaifolia	to 2 metres	details
Stalked Conestick	Petrophile pedunculata	to 2.5 metres	details
Purple mirbelia	Mirbelia speciosa	to 1 metre	details
Ground covers
Flannel flower	Actinotus helianthi		details
Sedge	Cyathochaeta diandra		details
Sreading flax lily	Dianella revoluta		details
Wiry panic	Entolasia stricta		details
Scale rush	Lepyrodia scariosa		details
Pale mat rush	Lomandra glauca		details
Twisted mat rush	Lomandra obliqua		details
Silky Purple-flag	Patersonia sericea		details
Other species (amongst hundreds of others)
Actinotus minor; Monotoca elliptica; Acacia myrtifolia; Acacia hispidula; Hovea linearis; Monotoca elliptica; Isopogon anemonifolius; Leucopogon muticus; Persoonia levis; Persoonia linearis; Hovea linearis; Kunzea rupestris; Schizaea bifida; Eucalyptus luehmanniana; Eucalyptus sieberi; Angophora hispida; Persoonia levis; Petrophile sessilis; Phebalium squamulosum; Ptilothrix deusta; Caladenia minorata; Cryptostylis hunteriana; Phyllanthus hirtellus; Grevillea buxifolia; Hakea sericea

== See also ==
- Eastern Suburbs Banksia Scrub
- Chaparral
- Garrigue
