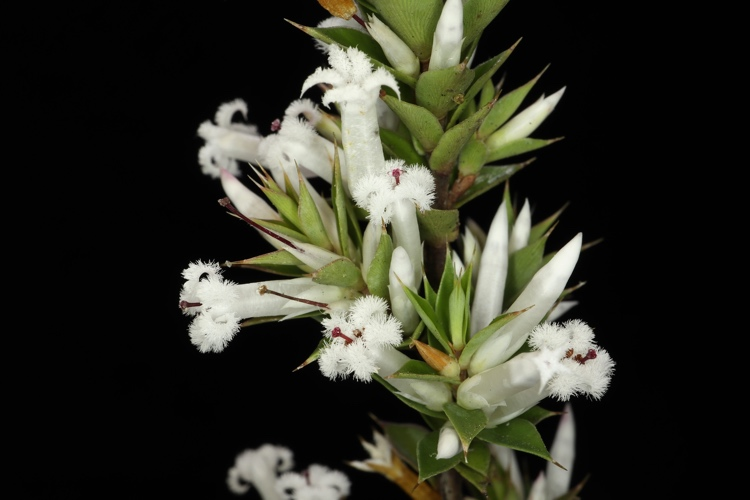
- In the Australian National Botanic Gardens

Scientific classification
- Kingdom: Plantae
- Clade: Tracheophytes
- Clade: Angiosperms
- Clade: Eudicots
- Clade: Asterids
- Order: Ericales
- Family: Ericaceae
- Genus: Styphelia
- Species: S. appressa

Binomial name
- Styphelia appressa (R.Br.) ]]Spreng.]]
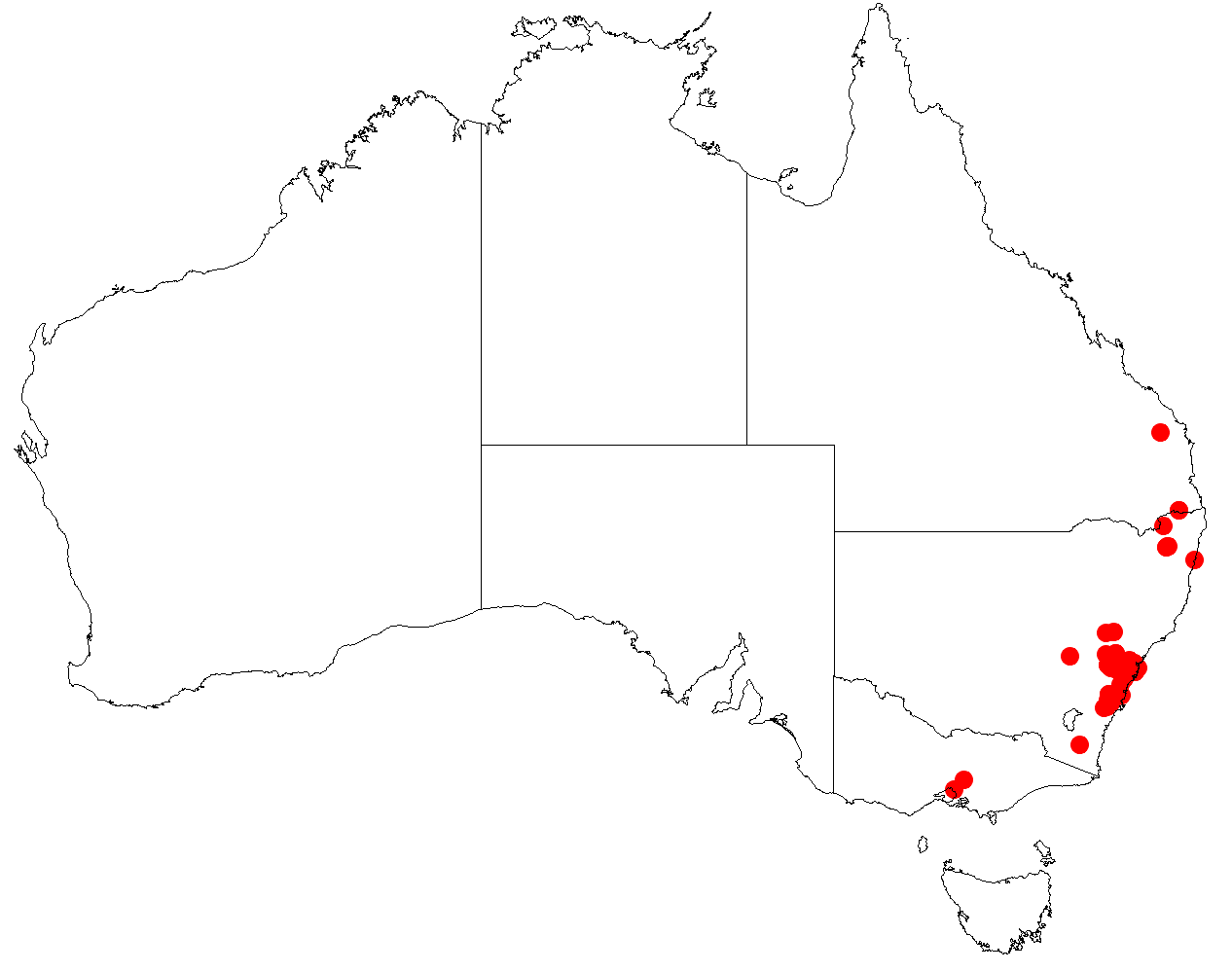
- Occurrence data from AVH

Synonyms
- Leucopogon appressus (R.Br.)

= Styphelia appressa =

Species of shrub

Styphelia appressa is a species of flowering plant in the heath family Ericaceae and is endemic to south-eastern New South Wales. It is a small, spreading to erect shrub with wiry stems, lance-shaped or narrowly egg-shaped to elliptic leaves and small white flowers.

== Description ==
Styphelia appressa is a weak, spreading to erect shrub that typically grows to a height of 30–60 cm (12–24 in) and has wiry, hairy branches. The leaves are directed upwards, pressed against the stem, narrowly egg-shaped with the narrower end towards the base, or elliptic, 4.1–15 mm (0.16–0.59 in) long and 1.0–2.6 mm (0.039–0.102 in) wide on a petiole 0.3–0.4 mm (0.012–0.016 in) long. The upper surface of the leaves is concave and there is a long, fine point on the tip. The flowers are white and arranged singly in leaf axils in dense heads at the ends of branches. The sepals are 1.5–2.0 mm (0.059–0.079 in) long with bracteoles about 1 mm (0.039 in) long at the base. The petal tube is 1.5–1.75 mm (0.059–0.069 in) long with hairy lobes 1.1–1.5 mm (0.043–0.059 in) long. Flowering occurs from December to February and is followed by glabrous oval to elliptic drupes about 1.6 mm (0.06 in) long.

== Taxonomy ==
This species was first formally described in 1810 by Robert Brown who gave it the name Leucopogon appressus in his Prodromus Florae Novae Hollandiae. In 1824, Kurt Polycarp Joachim Sprengel transferred the species to Styphelia as S. appressa in Systema Vegetabilium. The specific epithet (appressa) means "pressed down", referring to the leaves pressed against the stem.

== Distribution and habitat ==
Styphelia appressa grows in heath and shrubby forest in soils derived from sandstone on the coast and nearby tablelands of New South Wales near Sydney and in the Wollemi National Park.
