= Styphelia flexifolia =

Scientific classification
- Kingdom: Plantae
- Clade: Tracheophytes
- Clade: Angiosperms
- Clade: Eudicots
- Clade: Asterids
- Order: Ericales
- Family: Ericaceae
- Genus: Styphelia
- Species: S. flexifolia

Binomial name
- Styphelia flexifolia (R.Br.) Spreng.
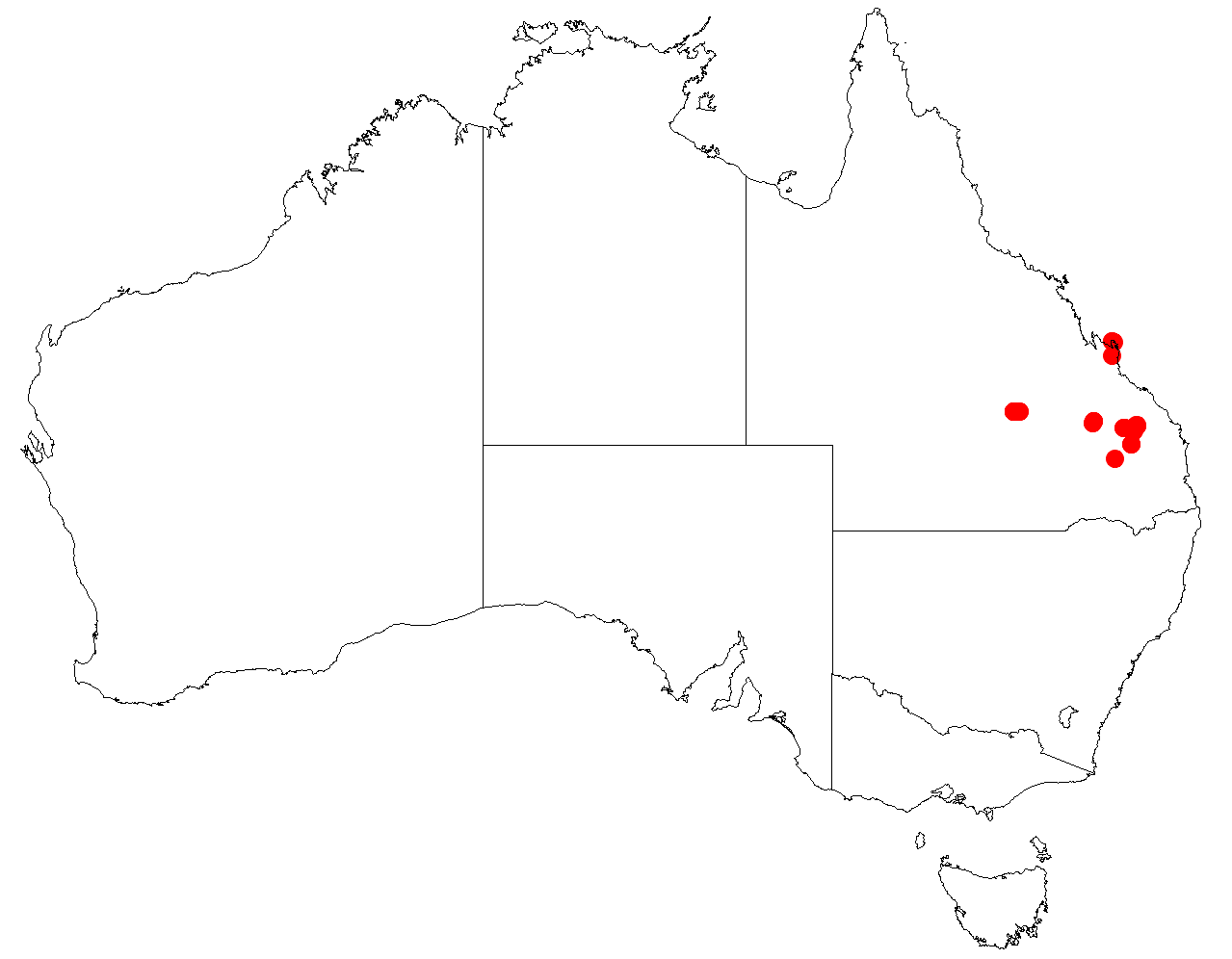
- Occurrence data from AVH

Synonyms
- Leucopogon flexifolius R.Br.

Species of shrub

Styphelia flexifolia is a species of flowering plant in the family Ericaceae and is endemic to south-east Queensland. It is a rigid shrub with many softly-hairy branchlets, crowded, sharply-pointed linear to lance-shaped leaves, and small, white, bell-shaped flowers that are bearded inside.

== Description ==
Styphelia flexifolia is a shrub that typically grows to a height of 30–60 cm (12–24 in) and has many softly-hairy branchlets. Its leaves are crowded, linear to lance-shaped with a fine point on the end and 4–8.5 mm (0.16–0.33 in) long. The flowers are arranged in two to four upper leaf axils on a short peduncle with small bracts and bracteoles about 0.5 mm (0.020 in) long. The sepals are about 1.6 mm (0.063 in) long and the petals white and about 2 mm (0.079 in) long, forming a bell-shaped tube with lobes about as long as the petal tube and hairy inside.

== Taxonomy ==
This species was first formally described in 1810 by Robert Brown who gave it the name Leucopogon flexifolius in his Prodromus Florae Novae Hollandiae et Insulae Van Diemen, from specimens he collected at Shoalwater Bay. In 1824, Kurt Polycarp Joachim Sprengel transferred the species to Styphelia as S. flexifolia in Systema Vegetabilium. The specific epithet (flexifolia) means "pliable-leaved".

== Distribution ==
This styphelia grows in south-east Queensland.
