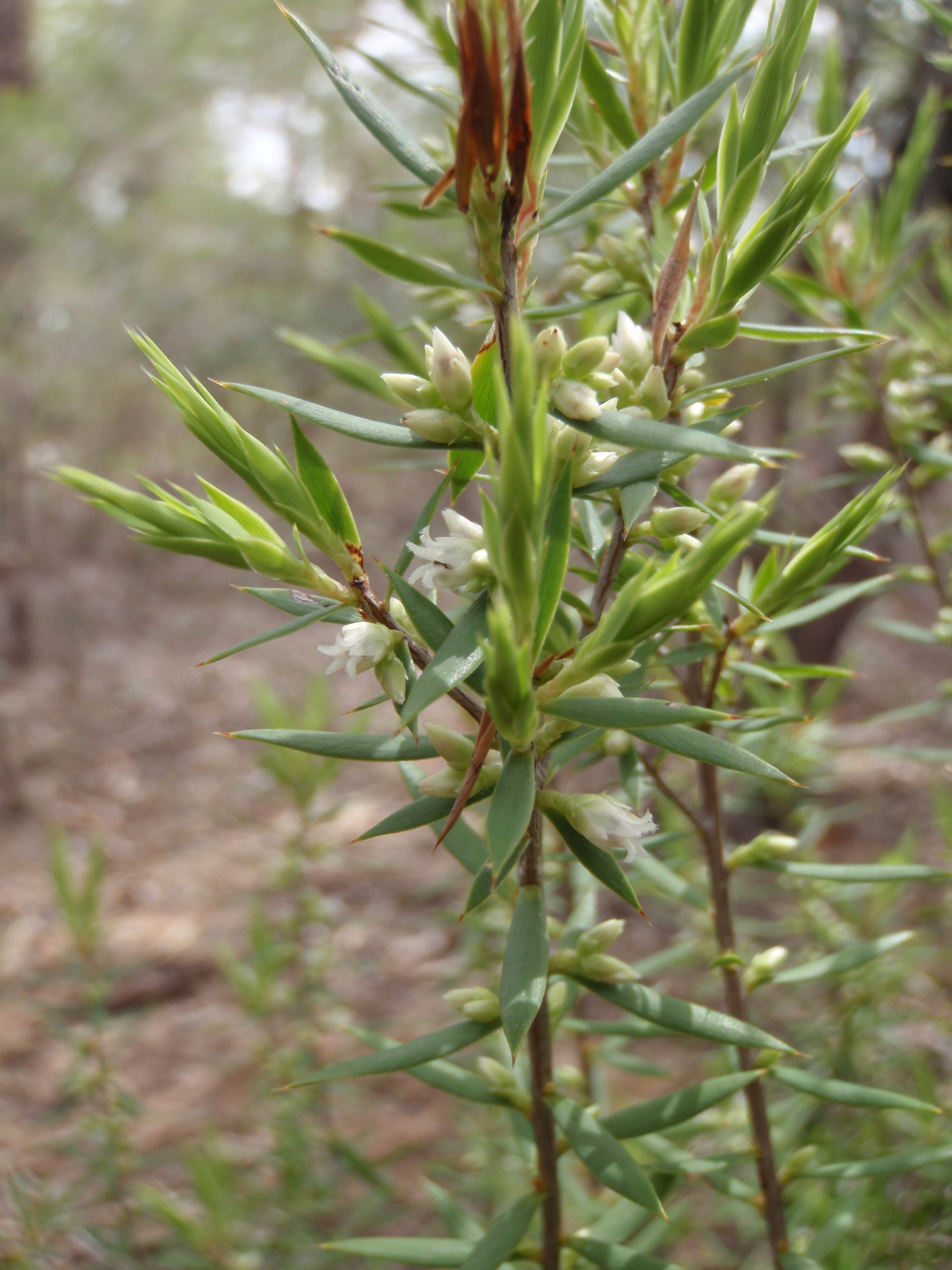

Scientific classification
- Kingdom: Plantae
- Clade: Tracheophytes
- Clade: Angiosperms
- Clade: Eudicots
- Clade: Asterids
- Order: Ericales
- Family: Ericaceae
- Genus: Styphelia
- Species: S. acuminata

Binomial name
- Styphelia acuminata (R.Br.) Spreng.
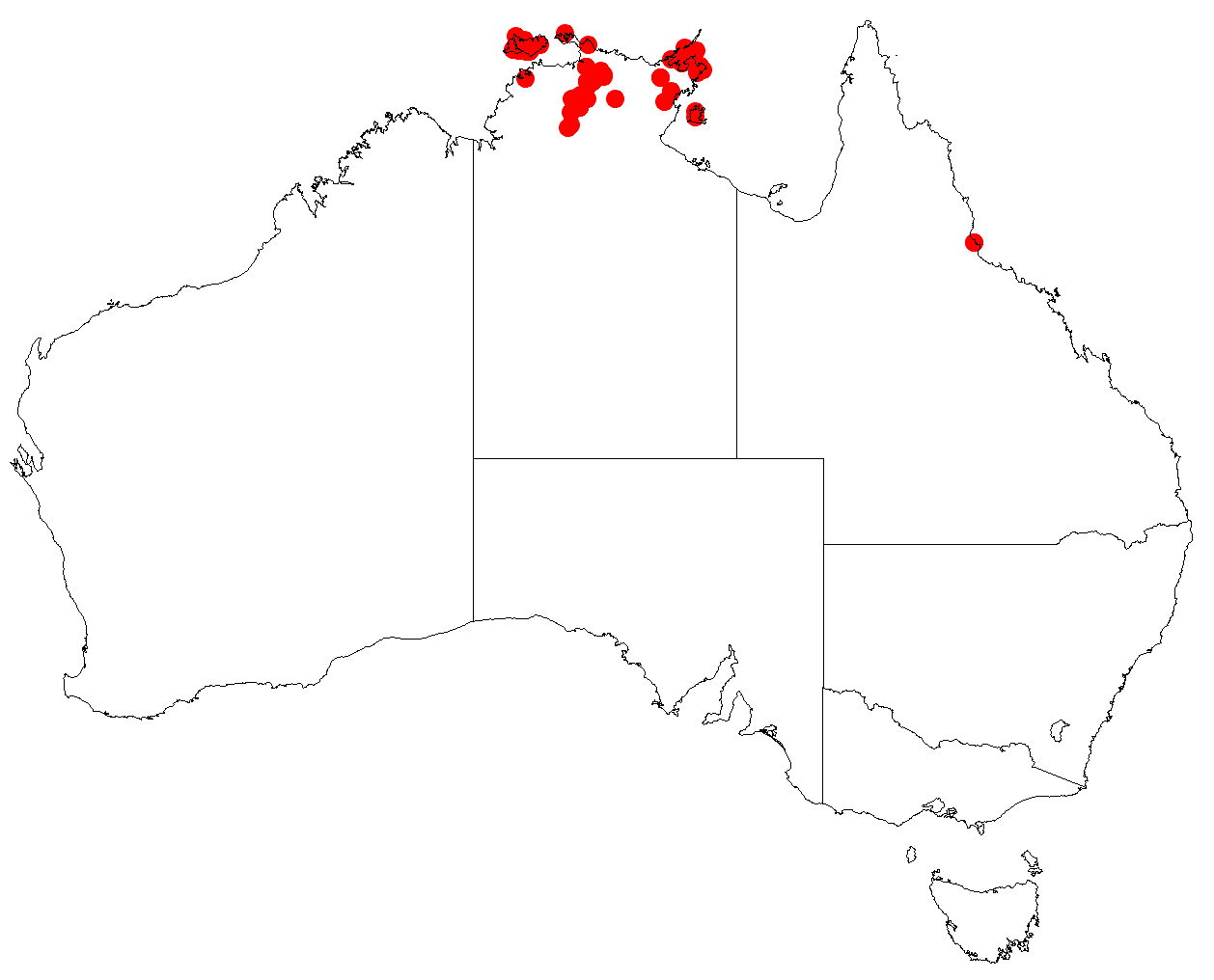
- Occurrence data from AVH

Synonyms
- Leucopogon acuminatus R.Br.

= Styphelia acuminata =

Species of plant

Styphelia acuminata is a species of flowering plant in the heath family Ericaceae and is endemic to the Northern Territory. It is a compact, erect shrub with narrowly elliptic or lance-shaped leaves and small groups of white or cream-coloured flowers.

== Description ==
Styphelia acuminata is a compact, erect or rounded shrub that typically grows to a height of 0.5–2 m (1 ft 8 in – 6 ft 7 in) with soft hairs and prominent leaf scars on the branchlets. Its leaves are sessile, narrowly elliptic or lance-shaped, 5–17 mm (0.20–0.67 in) long and 1–2.5 mm (0.039–0.098 in) wide with a sharply-pointed tip. The flowers are arranged in pairs or three on a peduncle 0.5–1 mm (0.020–0.039 in) long with an egg-shaped bract about 0.5 mm (0.020 in) long and bracteoles 1.3–1.5 mm (0.051–0.059 in) long at the base. The sepals are egg-shaped, 2.2–2.5 mm (0.087–0.098 in) long and the petals are white or cream-coloured, joined at the base to form a tube about 1 mm (0.039 in) long with hairs inside, the lobes 1.8–2.3 mm (0.071–0.091 in) long. Flowering occurs from September to March and the fruit is a more or less spherical drupe 3.0–3.8 mm (0.12–0.15 in) long.

== Taxonomy and naming ==
This species was first formally described in 1810 by Robert Brown who gave it the name Leucopogon acuminatus in his Prodromus Florae Novae Hollandiae. In 1824, Kurt Polycarp Joachim Sprengel transferred the species to Styphelia as S. acuminata in Systema Vegetabilium. The specific epithet (acuminata) means "pointed".

== Distribution and habitat ==
Styphelia acuminata mainly grows in heath and woodland in the Top End of the Northern Territory from Bathurst and Melville Islands to the Gulf of Carpentaria and as far south as Katherine.
