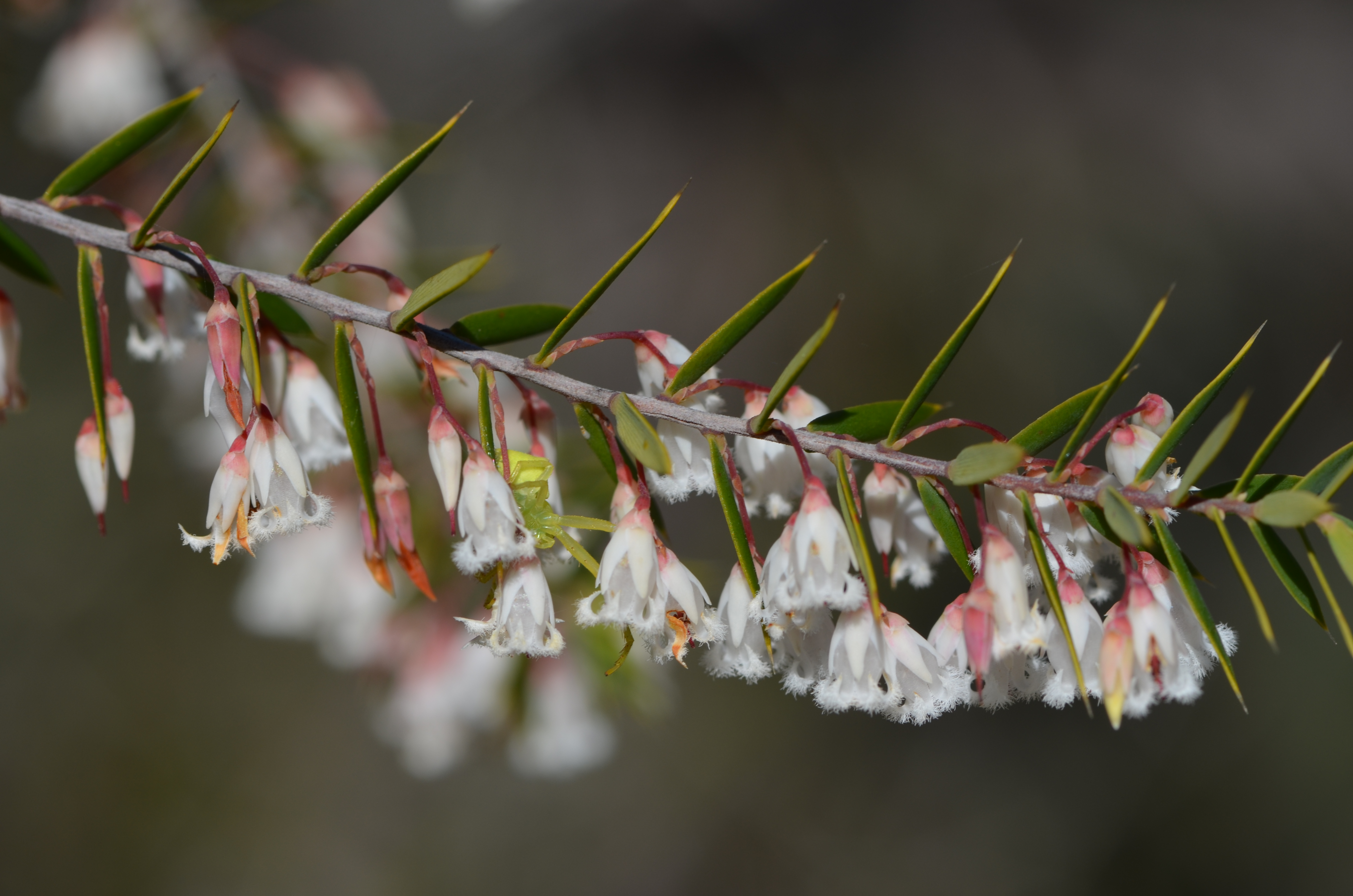
- In Muogamarra Nature Reserve

Scientific classification
- Kingdom: Plantae
- Clade: Tracheophytes
- Clade: Angiosperms
- Clade: Eudicots
- Clade: Asterids
- Order: Ericales
- Family: Ericaceae
- Genus: Styphelia
- Species: S. setigera

Binomial name
- Styphelia setigera (R.Br.) Spreng.
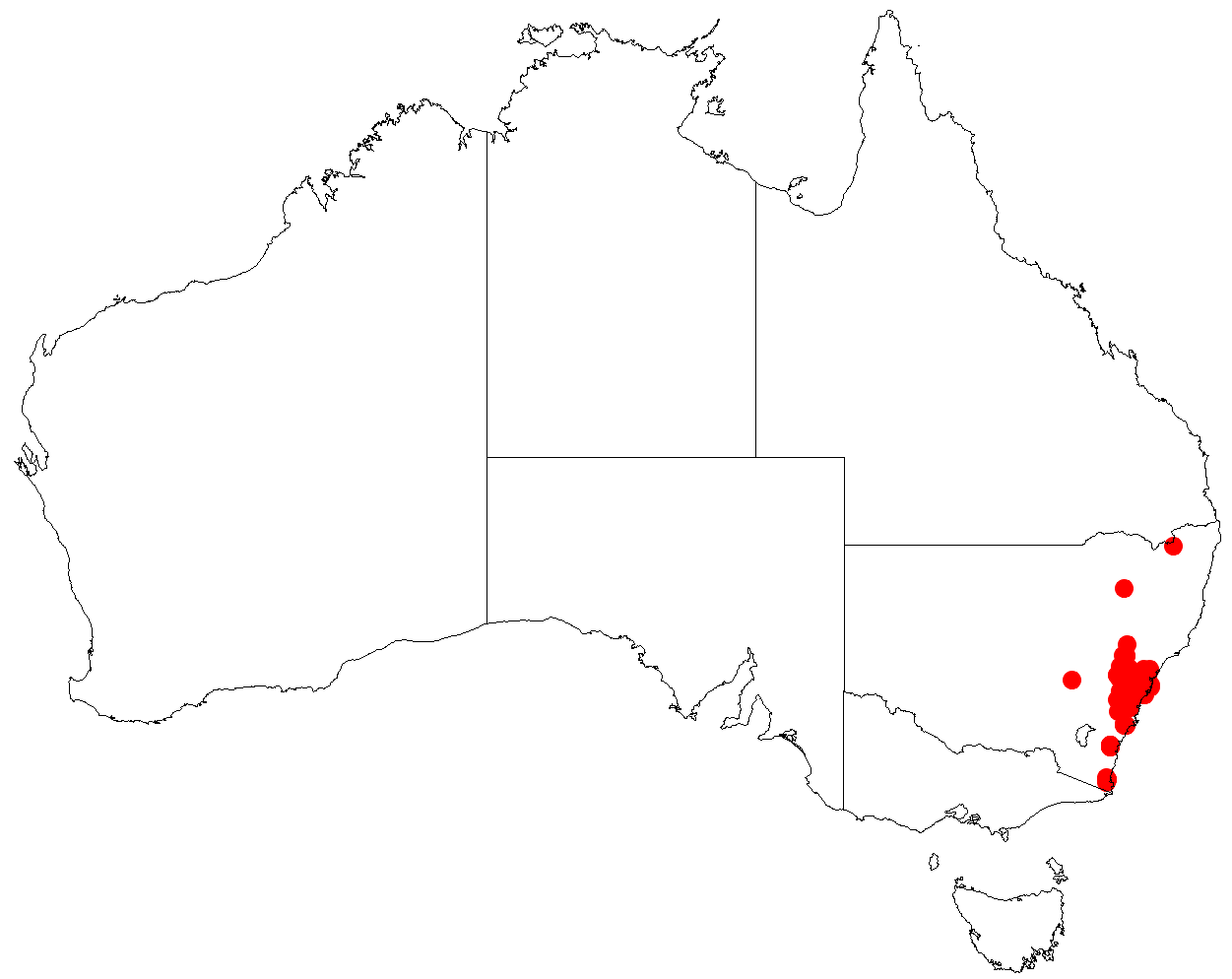
- Occurrence data from AVH

Synonyms
- Leucopogon setiger (R.Br.)

= Styphelia setigera =

Species of shrub

Styphelia setigera is a species of flowering plant in the heath family Ericaceae and is endemic to eastern New South Wales. It is an erect to spreading shrub with lance-shaped to elliptic leaves, and white, tube-shaped flowers arranged singly or in pairs in leaf axils, forming a spike 10–16 mm (0.39–0.63 in) long.

== Description ==
Styphelia setigera is an erect to spreading shrub that typically grows to a height of 0.3–1.5 m (1 ft 0 in – 4 ft 11 in). Its leaves are lance-shaped to elliptic, 7–10 mm (0.28–0.39 in) long, 1.4–2.1 mm (0.055–0.083 in) wide and sessile, but with a sharply-pointed bristle on the tip. Both sides of the leaves are usually glabrous, the lower surface finely striated. The flowers are borne singly or in pairs in leaf axils forming a spike 10–16 mm (0.39–0.63 in) long, with bracteoles 1.1–1.5 mm (0.043–0.059 in) long at the base. The sepals are 2.7–4.2 mm (0.11–0.17 in) long, the petals white and joined at the base, forming a tube 2.3–3.0 mm (0.091–0.118 in) long, the lobes 2.6–4.0 mm (0.10–0.16 in) long and bearded on the inside. Flowering occurs from July to October, and the fruit is about 4.2 mm (0.17 in) long and glabrous.

== Taxonomy ==
This species was first formally described in 1810 by Robert Brown who gave it the name Leucopogon setiger in his Prodromus Florae Novae Hollandiae. In 1824, Kurt Polycarp Joachim Sprengel transferred the species to Styphelia as S. setigera in Systema Vegetabilium. The specific epithet (setigera) means "bristle-bearing".

== Distribution and habitat ==
Styphelia setigera grows in shrubby woodland on sandstone, sometimes in heath and wetter areas, and is widespread on the coast and tablelands south from Sydney and the Blue Mountains.
