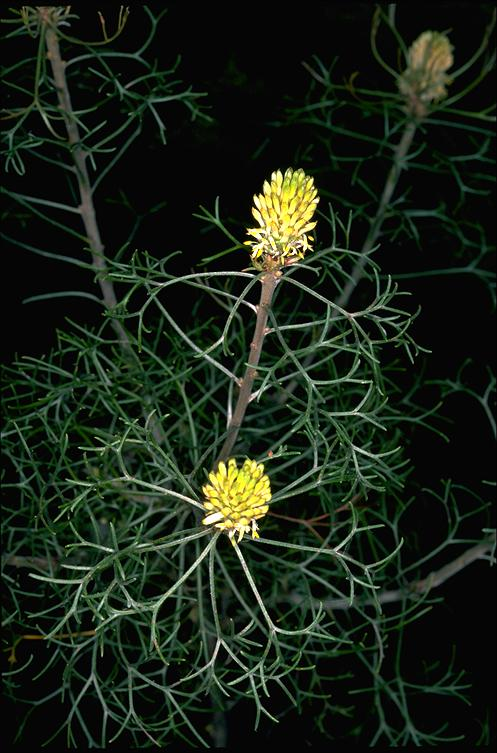
- Petrophile sessilis near Bylong

Scientific classification
- Kingdom: Plantae
- Clade: Tracheophytes
- Clade: Angiosperms
- Clade: Eudicots
- Order: Proteales
- Family: Proteaceae
- Genus: Petrophile
- Species: P. sessilis

Binomial name
- Petrophile sessilis Sieber ex Schult.

Synonyms
- Petrophila pulchella var. sessilis Domin orth. var.; Petrophile pulchella var. sessilis (Sieber ex Schult.) Domin

= Petrophile sessilis =

Conesticks

Species of shrub found in eastern Australia

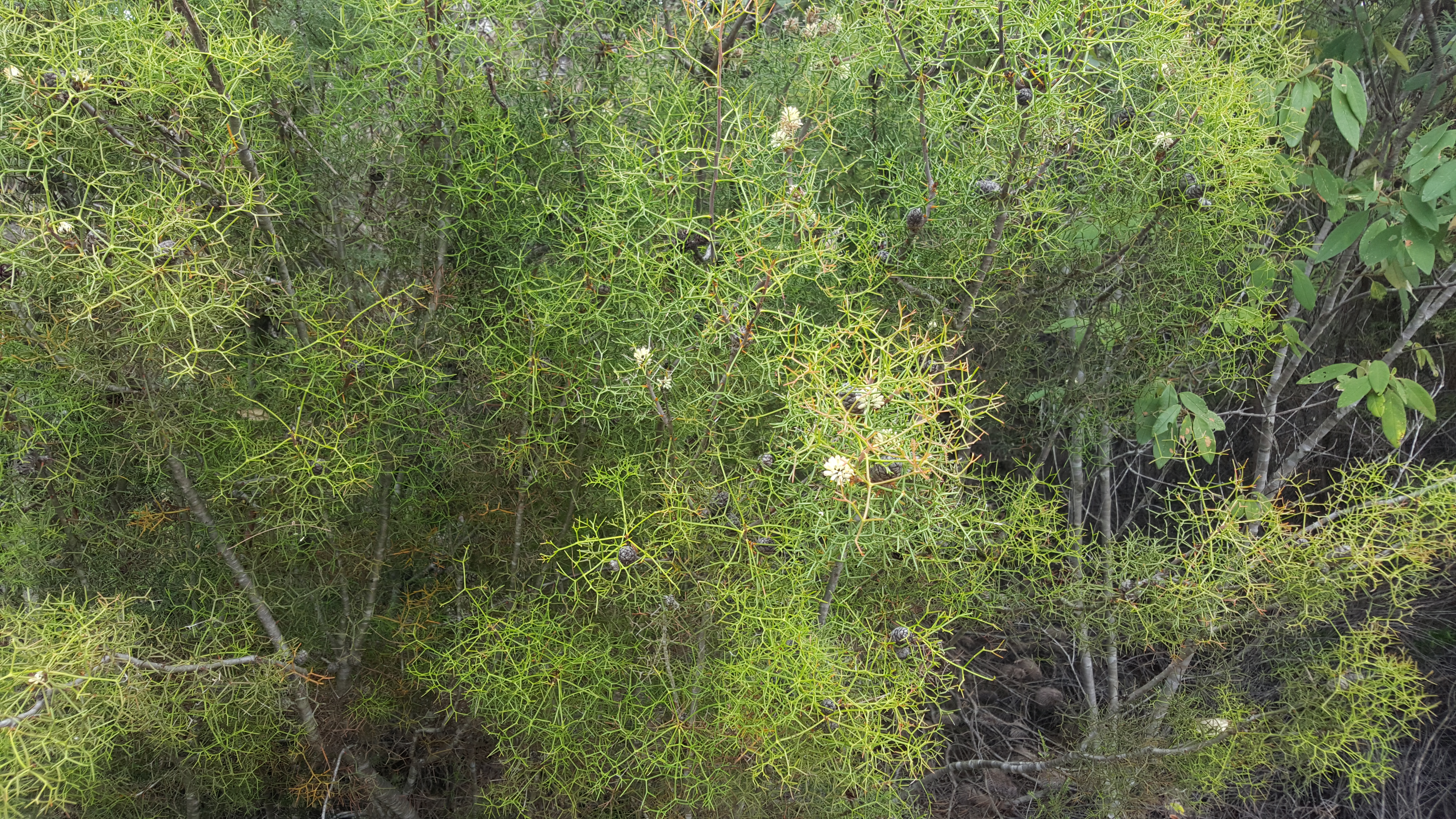
Habit in Dharawal National Park

Petrophile sessilis, known as conesticks, is a species of flowering plant in the family Proteaceae and is endemic to New South Wales. It is an erect shrub with rigid, needle-shaped, divided, sharply-pointed leaves, and oval, spike-like heads of silky-hairy, creamy-yellow flowers.

== Description ==
Petrophile sessilis is an erect shrub that typically grows to a height of 3 m (9.8 ft) and has branchlets and leaves that are silky-hairy when young but become glabrous with age. The leaves are 30–100 mm (1.2–3.9 in) long and divided with rigid, sharply-pointed, needle-shaped pinnae usually less than 10 mm (0.39 in) long. The flowers are arranged on the ends of branchlets and in leaf axils in spike-like, oval heads 20–25 mm (0.79–0.98 in) long, with broadly egg-shaped involucral bracts at the base. The flowers are 10–14 mm (0.39–0.55 in) long, silky-hairy and creamy-yellow. Flowering mainly occurs from May to February and the fruit is a nut, fused with others in an oval head up to 35 mm (1.4 in) long. It can be distinguished from the related Petrophile pulchella by its finely hairy new growth.

== Taxonomy ==
Petrophile sessilis was first formally described in 1827 by Josef August Schultes in the 16th edition of Systema Vegetabilium from an unpublished description by Franz Sieber.

== Distribution and habitat ==
Petrophile sessilis grows on sandstone soils in heath, woodland and forest from the Central Coast to the Central and Southern Tablelands of New South Wales.
