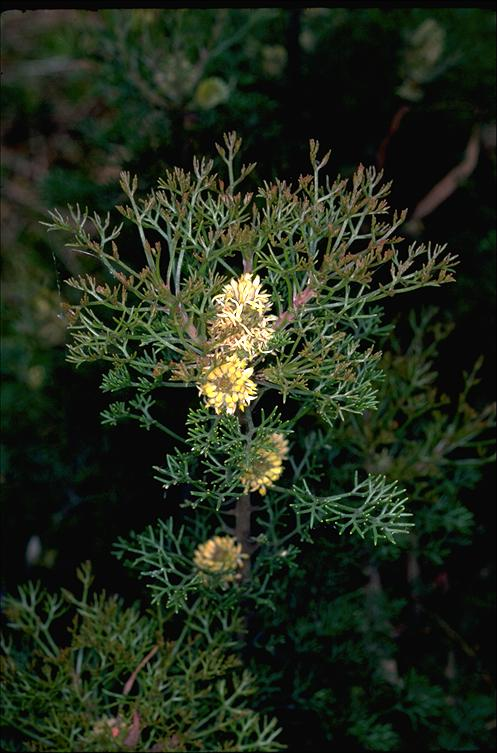
- Petrophile canescens in the ANBG

Scientific classification
- Kingdom: Plantae
- Clade: Tracheophytes
- Clade: Angiosperms
- Clade: Eudicots
- Order: Proteales
- Family: Proteaceae
- Genus: Petrophile
- Species: P. canescens

Binomial name
- Petrophile canescens A.Cunn. ex R.Br.

Synonyms
- Petrophila canescens R.Br. orth. var.; Petrophila pulchella var. canescens Domin orth. var.; Petrophile pulchella var. canescens (A.Cunn. ex R.Br.) Domin

= Petrophile canescens =

Conesticks

Species of shrub found in eastern Australia

Petrophile canescens, commonly known as conesticks, is a species of flowering plant in the family Proteaceae and is endemic to eastern Australia. It is an erect shrub with pinnately-divided leaves and oval heads of hairy, white to pale cream-coloured flowers.

== Description ==
Petrophile canescens is an erect shrub that typically grows to a height of 0.5–3 m (1 ft 8 in – 9 ft 10 in) and has branchlets and leaves that have silky grey hairs when young. The leaves are cylindrical, 30–110 mm (1.2–4.3 in) long on a petiole 20–50 mm (0.79–1.97 in) long and pinnately divided, the undivided part longer than the divided part. The flowers are arranged in sessile, oval heads 10–25 mm (0.39–0.98 in) long, sometimes in groups of up to four with hairy, triangular involucral bracts at the base. The flowers are 9–12 mm (0.35–0.47 in) long, white to pale cream-coloured and silky-hairy. Flowering occurs from September to January and the fruit is a nut, fused with others in an oval to spherical head 15–40 mm (0.59–1.57 in) long.

This petrophile can be distinguished from the related Petrophile pulchella by its finely hairy new growth.

== Taxonomy ==
Petrophile canescens was first formally described in 1830 by Robert Brown from an unpublished description by Allan Cunningham. Brown's description was published in the Supplementum to his Prodromus Florae Novae Hollandiae et Insulae Van Diemen. The specific epithet (canescens) means "becoming or being somewhat white or hoary".

== Distribution and habitat ==
Conesticks grows in forest and sandy heath on the Blackdown Tableland in Queensland and south to Nerriga and as far west as Warialda in New South Wales.
