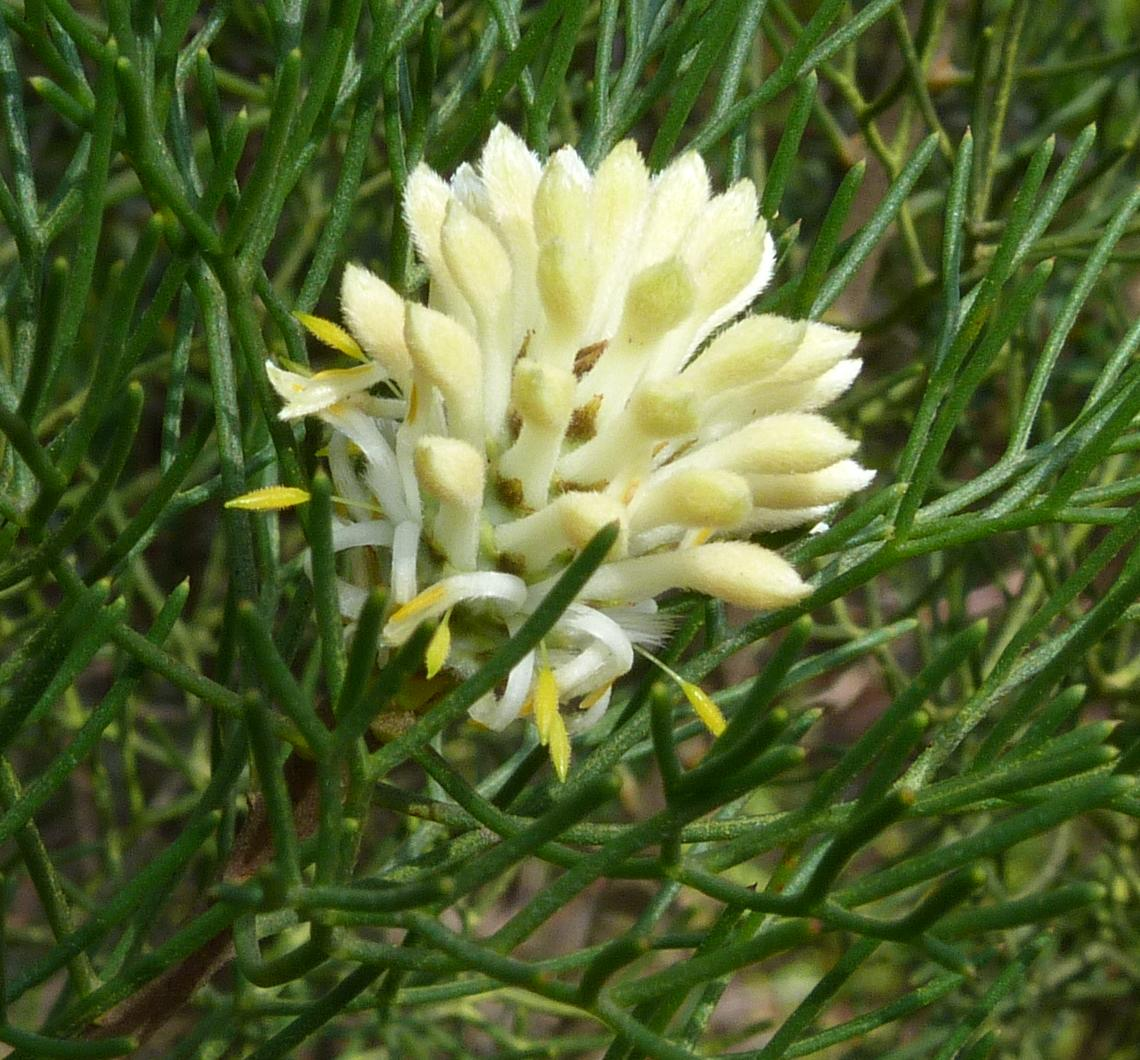
- Blackheath, Australia

Scientific classification
- Kingdom: Plantae
- Clade: Tracheophytes
- Clade: Angiosperms
- Clade: Eudicots
- Order: Proteales
- Family: Proteaceae
- Genus: Petrophile
- Species: P. pulchella

Binomial name
- Petrophile pulchella (Schrad. & J.C.Wendl.) R.Br.

Synonyms
- List: Protea pulchella Schrad. & J.C.Wendl.; Petrophile pulchella (Schrad. & J.C.Wendl.) R.Br. var. pulchella; Petrophile pulchella var. typica Domin nom. inval.; Protea fucifolia Salisb.; Protea dichotoma Cav.; Petrophile fucifolia (Salisb.) Knight; Atylus fucifolia B.D.Jacks. nom. inval., pro syn.

= Petrophile pulchella =

Conesticks

Species of shrub found in eastern Australia

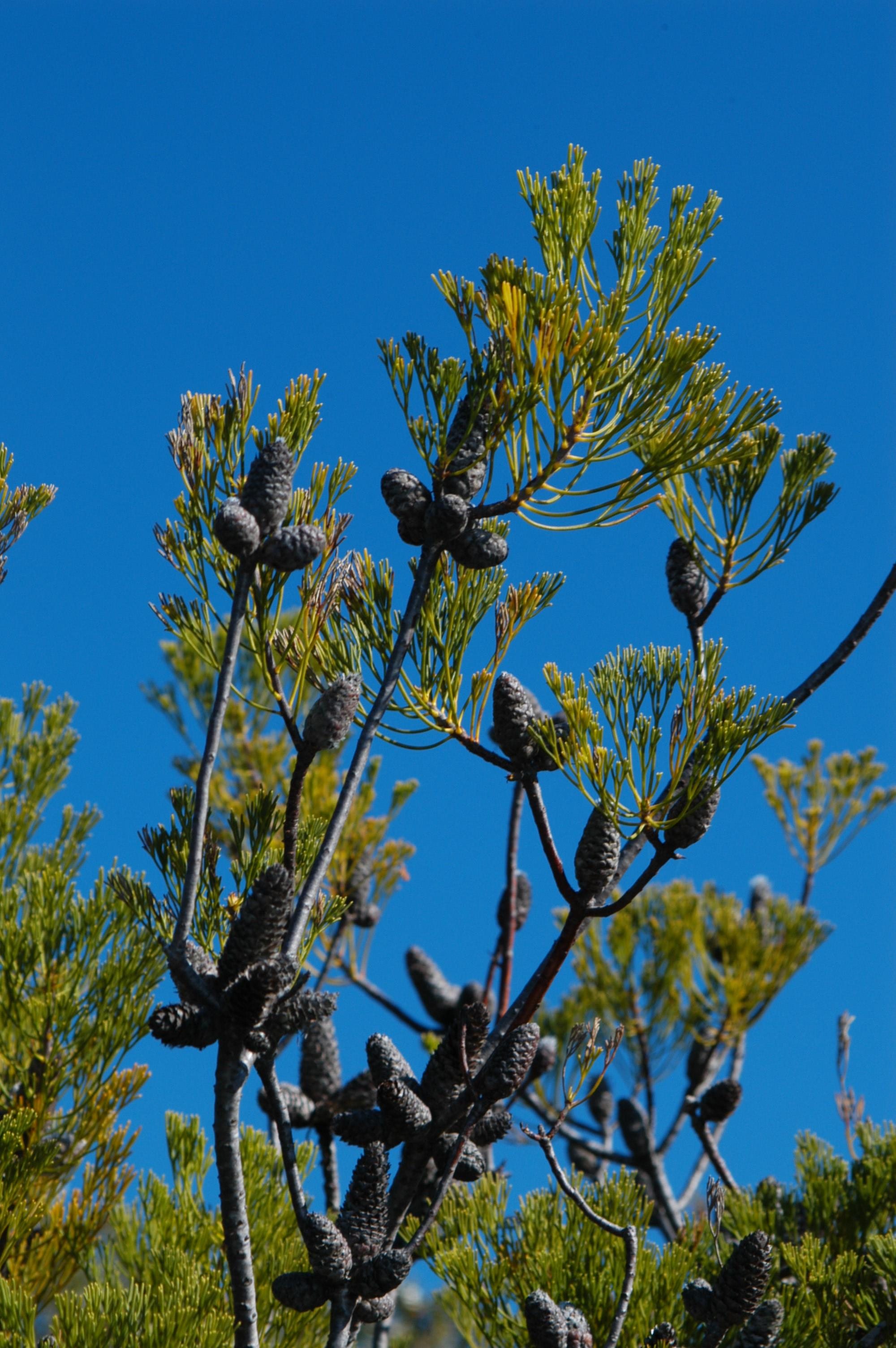
Old cones, Bombi Moors, Bouddi National Park

Petrophile pulchella, commonly known as conesticks, is a species of flowering plant in the family Proteaceae and is endemic to eastern Australia. The leaves are divided with needle-shaped but soft pinnae, the flowers silky-hairy, cream-coloured and arranged in oval heads and the fruit are arranged in oval heads.

== Description ==
Petrophile pulchella is a shrub that typically grows to a height of 1.5–3 m (4 ft 11 in – 9 ft 10 in) in sheltered locations but to only 50 cm (20 in) in exposed heathland. The branchlets and leaves are softly-hairy at first but become glabrous with age. The leaves are 40–90 mm (1.6–3.5 in) long on a petiole 30–50 mm (1.2–2.0 in) long, and divided two or three times with needle-shaped pinnae but that are soft rather than sharp-tipped. The flowers are arranged in leaf axils and on the ends of branchlets in oval heads 20–35 mm (0.79–1.38 in) long and are sessile or on a peduncle up to about 6 mm (0.24 in) long. The flowers are 6–10 mm (0.24–0.39 in) long, cream-coloured and silky-hairy. Flowering mostly occurs from August to March and the fruit is a nut 3–4 mm (0.12–0.16 in) long, fused with others in an oval head up to 65 mm (2.6 in) long. This species is distinguished from P. pedunculata by its flowerheads that are on peduncles 10–30 mm (0.39–1.18 in) long. The two other species in eastern Australia, P. canescens and P. sessilis, both have finely hairy new growth.

== Taxonomy ==
The shrub was first formally described in 1796 by Heinrich Schrader and Johann Christoph Wendland who gave it the name Protea pulchella in Sertum Hannoveranum, from the original specimen collected at Botany Bay. In 1810, the prolific botanist Robert Brown reclassified it in the new genus Petrophile as P. pulchella, publishing the name change in Transactions of the Linnean Society of London. The specific epithet pulchella meaning “beautiful” is derived from Latin, although noted plant author John Wrigley feels it to be somewhat of a misnomer. Joseph Knight, who had propagated and cultivated it successfully in England by 1809, reported, "It has few claims to a place in our collections."

== Distribution and habitat ==
Petrophile pulchella is found from south-eastern Queensland and south along the coast and adjacent tablelands to Jervis Bay in New South Wales. It often grows with trees such as Sydney peppermint (Eucalyptus piperita), smooth-barked apple (Angophora costata) or more open woodland e.g. with scribbly gum (Eucalyptus sclerophylla), silvertop ash (E. sieberi) or with shrubs such as mountain devil (Lambertia formosa), broad-leaved drumsticks (Isopogon anemonifolius) and paperbark tea-tree (Leptospermum trinervium).

== Ecology ==
Conesticks is killed by fire and regenerates afterwards by canopy-stored seedbank. Plants can live up to 60 years in nature. A field study in Brisbane Water National Park found that Petrophile pulchella had greater reproductive output in areas that had had two short intervals of under seven years between fires, over areas that had had one short interval, and that plants in these latter areas had greater reproductive output than areas with no intervals under seven years between fires. Seeds can germinate up to 700 days after a bushfire, and it is possible that the seedbank could theoretically last up to 90 years between fires. Native bees are possible pollinators of this species.
