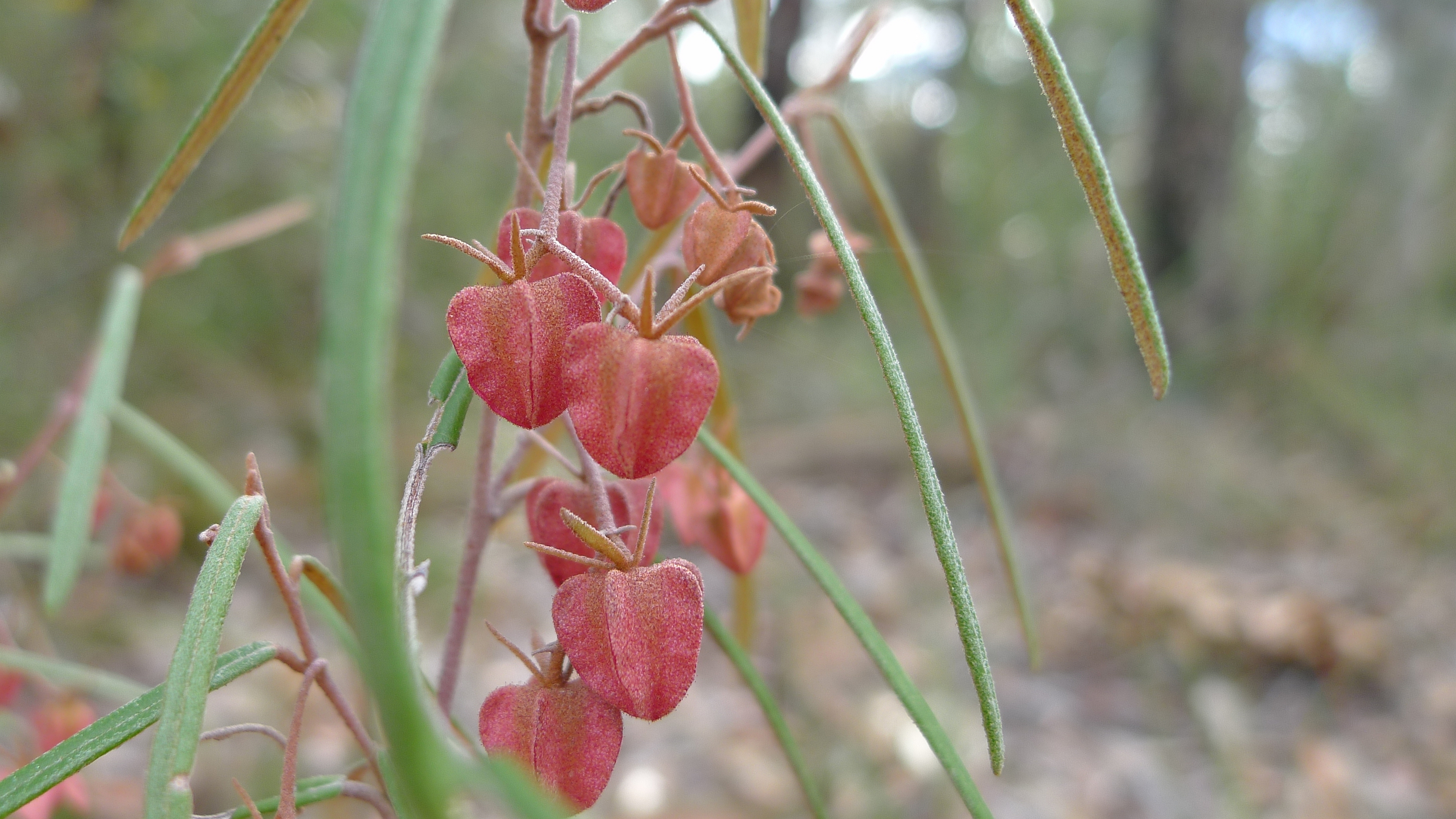
- In the Royal National Park

Scientific classification
- Kingdom: Plantae
- Clade: Tracheophytes
- Clade: Angiosperms
- Clade: Eudicots
- Clade: Rosids
- Order: Malvales
- Family: Malvaceae
- Genus: Lasiopetalum
- Species: L. rufum

Binomial name
- Lasiopetalum rufum R.Br. ex Benth.

= Lasiopetalum rufum =

Species of plant

Lasiopetalum rufum is a species of flowering plant in the family Malvaceae and is endemic to the Sydney region of New South Wales. It is a slender, erect or diffuse shrub with linear leaves and small groups of reddish or pinkish flowers.

== Description ==
Lasiopetalum rufum is a slender, erect or diffuse shrub that typically grows to a height of 0.5–1 m (1 ft 8 in – 3 ft 3 in). Its leaves are linear, mostly 40–60 mm (1.6–2.4 in) long on a petiole 2–3 mm (0.079–0.118 in) long and with the edges rolled under. The upper surface of the leaves is more or less glabrous and the lower surface is covered with woolly white hairs. The flowers are mostly arranged in groups of two or three on a short peduncle with bracteoles more tha 2 mm (0.079 in) long under the sepals. The petal-like sepals are mostly 4–5 mm (0.16–0.20 in) long, pinkish or reddish and hairy on both sides. Flowering occurs in spring, and the fruit is a woolly-hairy capsule 3–5 mm (0.12–0.20 in) im diameter.

== Taxonomy ==
Lasiiopetalum rufum was first described in 1863 by George Bentham from an unpublished description by Robert Brown who collected the type specimens from near the Georges River. Bentham's description was published in Flora Australiensis. The specific epithet (rufum) means "reddish".

== Distribution and habitat ==
This lasiopetalum grows in heath from the coast to the nearby ranges, mainly between Woy Woy and Menai in the Sydney region.
