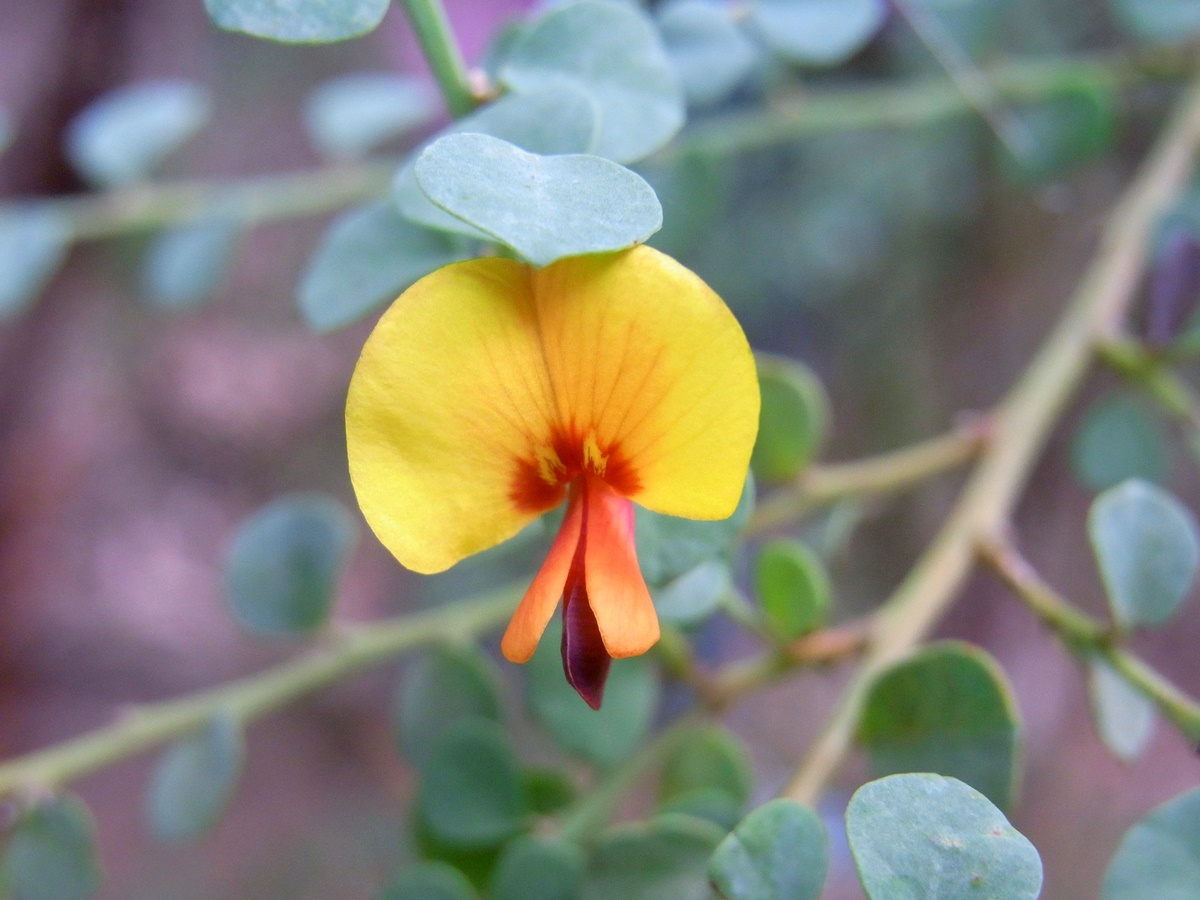
- In the Blue Mountains National Park

Scientific classification
- Kingdom: Plantae
- Clade: Tracheophytes
- Clade: Angiosperms
- Clade: Eudicots
- Clade: Rosids
- Order: Fabales
- Family: Fabaceae
- Subfamily: Faboideae
- Genus: Bossiaea
- Species: B. rhombifolia

Binomial name
- Bossiaea rhombifolia Sieber ex DC.
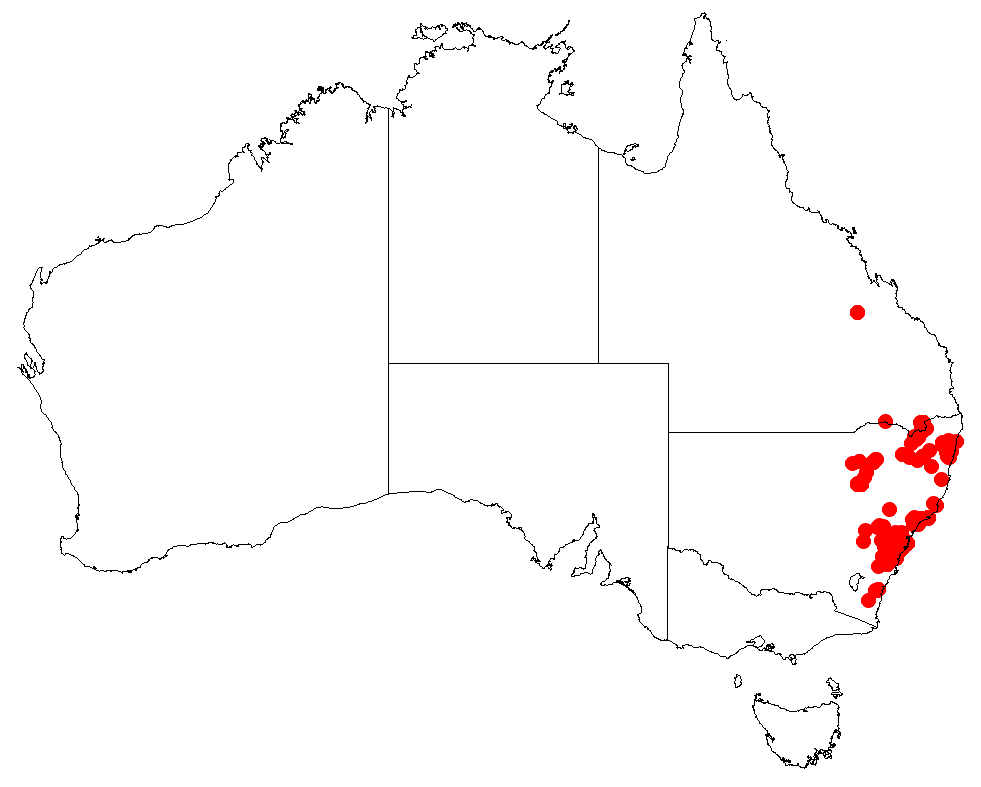
- Occurrence data from AVH

Synonyms
- Bossiaea lenticularis Lodd., G.Lodd. & W.Lodd. nom. illeg., nom. superfl.; Bossiaea rhombifolia Sieber ex DC. subsp. rhombifolia; Bossiaea rhombifolia Sieber ex DC. var. rhombifolia; Bossiaea rotundifolia DC.

= Bossiaea rhombifolia =

Species of legume

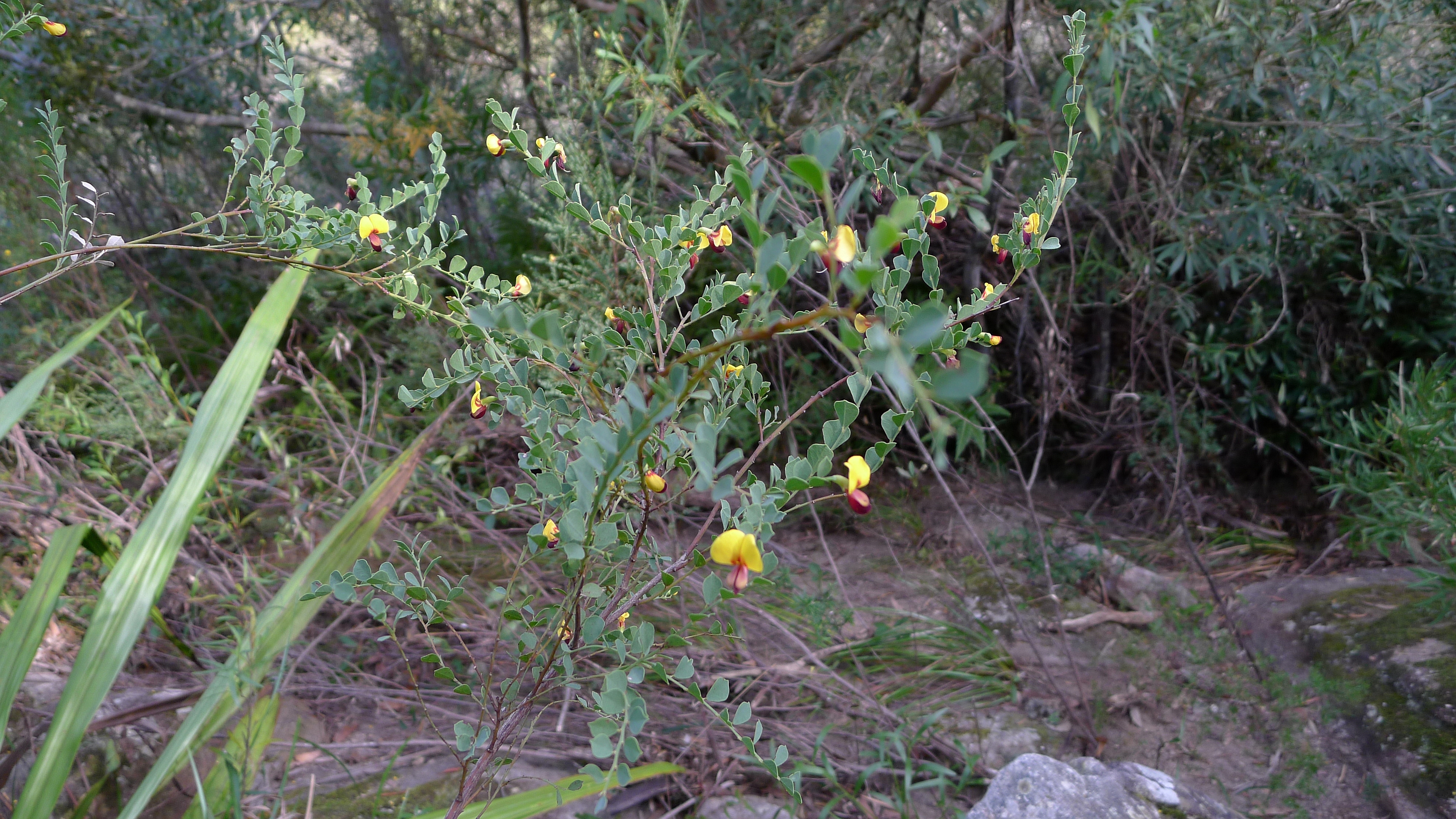
Habit in Heathcote National Park

Bossiaea rhombifolia, is a species of flowering plant in the family Fabaceae and is endemic to eastern Australia. It is an erect, glabrous shrub with diamond-shaped, more or less round or broadly egg-shaped leaves, and yellow and red or pinkish flowers.

== Description ==
Bossiaea rhombifolia is an erect, more or less glabrous shrub that typically grows to a height of up to 2 m (6 ft 7 in), and has slightly flattened young stems. The leaves are diamond-shaped, more or less round or broadly egg-shaped, 4–12 mm (0.16–0.47 in) long and wide on a petiole 0.5–1.0 mm (0.020–0.039 in) long with triangular brown stipules about 1 mm (0.039 in) long at the base. The flowers are 7–12 mm (0.28–0.47 in) long on pedicels up to 5 mm (0.20 in) long with bracts 0.5–0.8 mm (0.020–0.031 in) long at the base. The five sepals are 2.7–5 mm (0.11–0.20 in) long and joined at the base forming a tube, the upper lobes 0.6–1.5 mm (0.024–0.059 in) long and 1.5–2.5 mm (0.059–0.098 in) wide, the lower lobes slightly shorter and 0.7–1.0 mm (0.028–0.039 in) wide. There are egg-shaped bracteoles 0.8–1.5 mm (0.031–0.059 in) long near the base of the pedicel. The standard petal is yellow with a red base and up to 12 mm (0.47 in) long, the wings are brownish-red and 2.5–3.0 mm (0.098–0.118 in) wide, and the keel is pinkish to dark red and 3–4 mm (0.12–0.16 in) wide. Flowering occurs from July to October and the fruit is an oblong pod 13–18 mm (0.51–0.71 in) long.

== Taxonomy ==
Bossiaea rhombifolia was first formally described in 1825 by Augustin Pyramus de Candolle in Prodromus Systematis Naturalis Regni Vegetabilis from un unpublished description by Franz Sieber. The specific epithet (rhombifolia) means "diamond-shaped", referring to the leaves.

== Distribution and habitat ==
This species of Bossiaea grows in woodland and forest from near Stanthorpe in south-eastern Queensland to Wadbilliga National Park near Moruya in south-eastern New South Wales.
