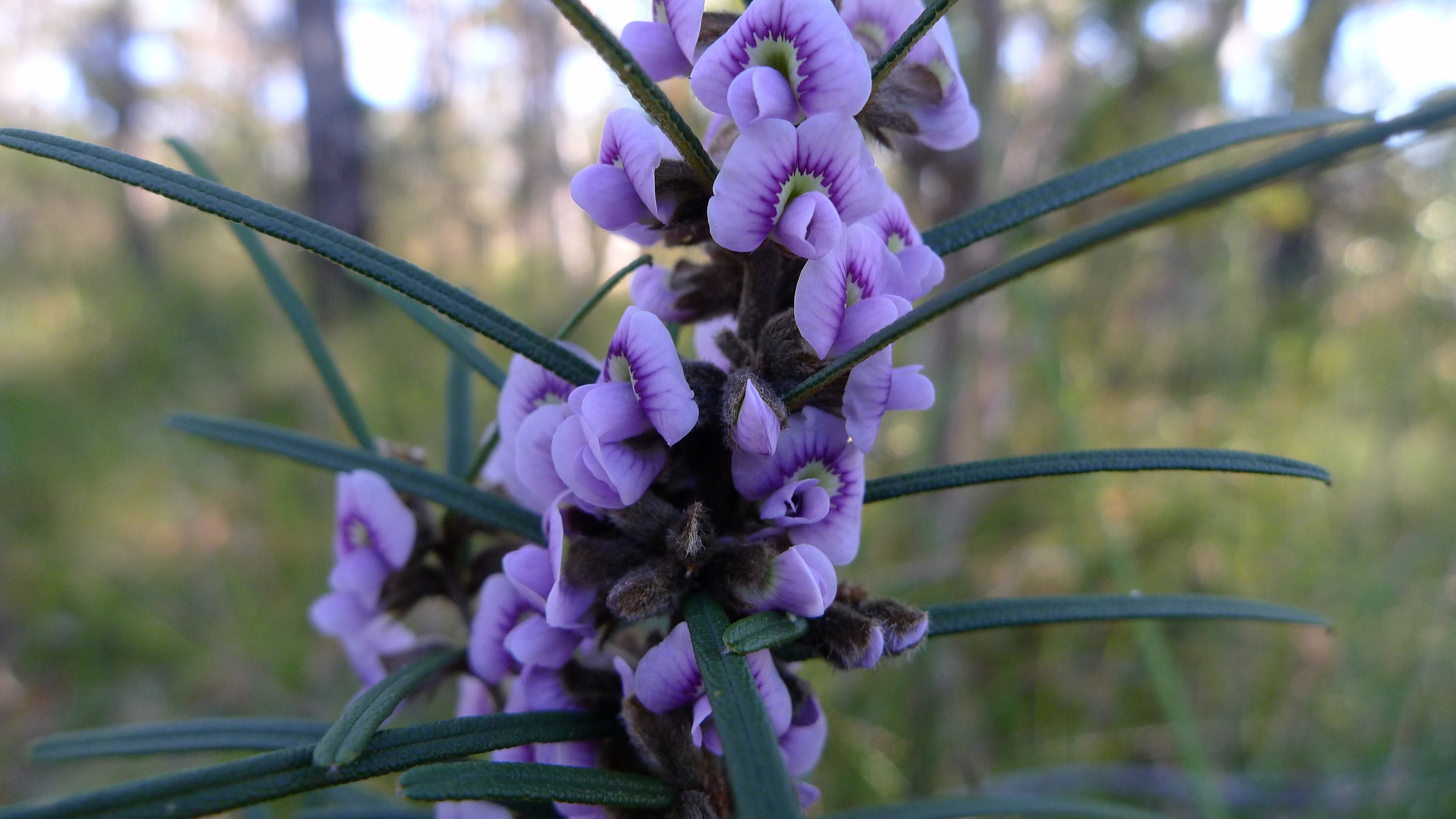
- In the Royal National Park, near Heathcote

Scientific classification
- Kingdom: Plantae
- Clade: Tracheophytes
- Clade: Angiosperms
- Clade: Eudicots
- Clade: Rosids
- Order: Fabales
- Family: Fabaceae
- Subfamily: Faboideae
- Genus: Hovea
- Species: H. linearis

Binomial name
- Hovea linearis (Sm.) R.Br.

Synonyms
- Hovea heterophylla A.Cunn. ex Hook.f. p.p.; Hovea heterophylla f. decipiens Domin p.p.; Phusicarpos linearis (Sm.) Poir.; Poiretia linearis Sm.

= Hovea linearis =

Species of plant

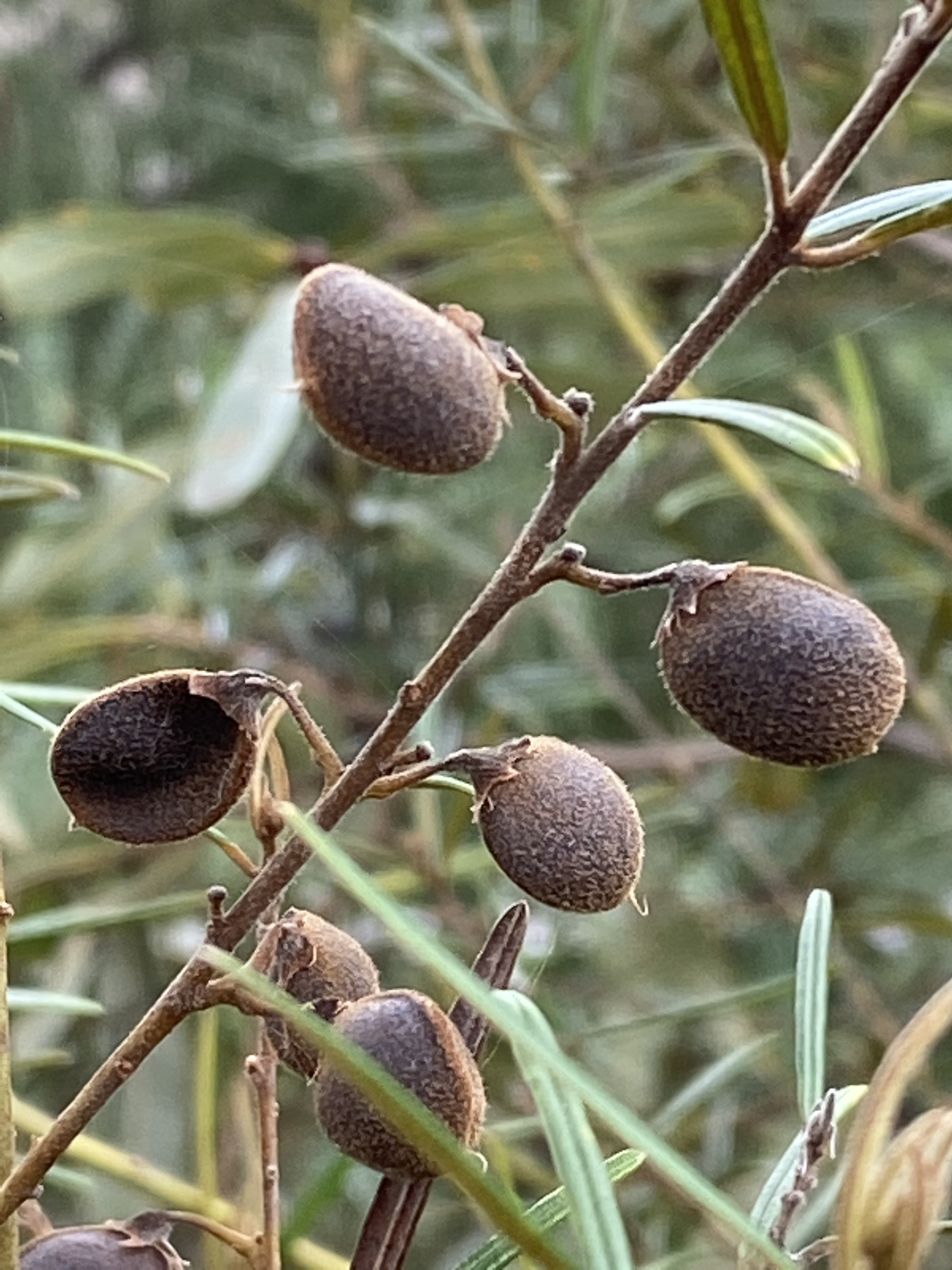
Fruit

Hovea linearis is a species of flowering plant in the family Fabaceae and is endemic to eastern Australia. It is an erect or trailing subshrub with mostly narrowly linear to linear leaves with stipules at the base, and mauve and yellowish-green, pea-like flowers.

== Description ==
Hovea linearis is an erect or trailing subshrub that sometimes grows to a height of up to 1.2 m (3 ft 11 in), its branchlets covered with brown and silvery or grey hairs. The leaves are narrowly linear to linear, 30–110 mm (1.2–4.3 in) long, 1.2–6 mm (0.047–0.236 in) wide on a petiole 2–3.5 mm (0.079–0.138 in) long with narrowly egg-shaped to lance-shaped stipules 1–2 mm (0.039–0.079 in) long at the base. The leaves are more or less erect, the upper surface glabrous and the lower surface with soft hairs pressed against the surface. The flowers are usually arranged in pairs, each flower on a pedicel 1.0–2.5 mm (0.039–0.098 in) long with bracts and bracteoles 1.5–2.5 mm (0.059–0.098 in) long at the base. The sepals are 4–6.5 mm (0.16–0.26 in) long, the upper pair forming a "lip" 4–5 mm (0.16–0.20 in) wide. The standard petal is mauve with a yellowish-green base and 7–10 mm (0.28–0.39 in) long, the wings 2.5–3.5 mm (0.098–0.138 in) long. Flowering occurs from July to September and the fruit is a glabrous pod 7–10 mm (0.28–0.39 in) long and wide.

Hovea heterophylla is similar to H. linearis but has its leaves often spreading to pendent, usually wider leaves, up to four flowers per leaf axil, and sepals 3.5–5 mm (0.14–0.20 in) long.

== Taxonomy ==
This species was first formally described in 1808 by James Edward Smith, who gave it the name Poiretia linearis in Transactions of the Linnean Society of London. In 1812, Robert Brown changed the name to Hovea linearis in William Aiton's Hortus Kewensis.

== Distribution and habitat ==
Hovea linearis grows in forest and woodland, mainly between Newcastle and Nowra in eastern New South Wales, but it is also known from the Blackdown Tableland in south-eastern Queensland.
