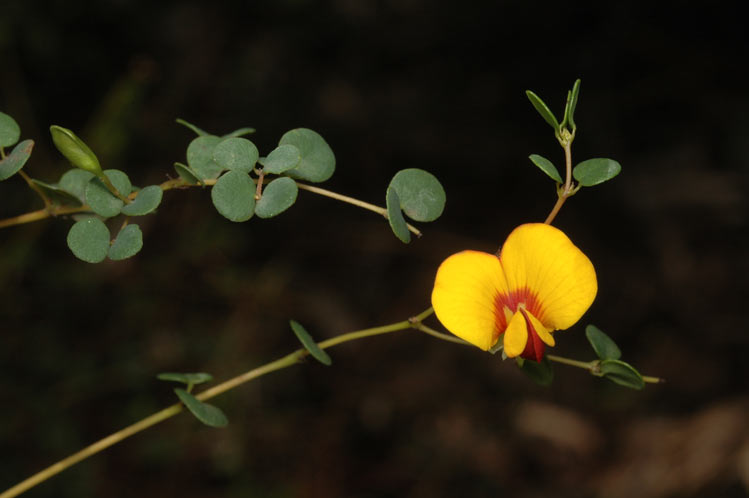
- In the Australian National Botanic Gardens

Scientific classification
- Kingdom: Plantae
- Clade: Tracheophytes
- Clade: Angiosperms
- Clade: Eudicots
- Clade: Rosids
- Order: Fabales
- Family: Fabaceae
- Subfamily: Faboideae
- Genus: Bossiaea
- Species: B. lenticularis

Binomial name
- Bossiaea lenticularis Sieber ex DC.

= Bossiaea lenticularis =

Species of legume

Bossiaea lenticularis is a species of flowering plant in the family Fabaceae and is endemic to eastern New South Wales. It is a slender, spreading shrub with mostly circular leaves, and yellow and red flowers.

== Description ==
Bossiaea lenticularis is a slender spreading shrub that typically grows to a height of up to 1 m (3 ft 3 in) and is more or less glabrous. The leaves are mostly circular, 2–8 mm (0.079–0.315 in) long in diameter with stipules up to 1 mm (0.039 in) long at the base. The flowers are 6–12 mm (0.24–0.47 in) long, each flower on a pedicel up to about 5 mm (0.20 in) long with a few bracts up to 1.0 mm (0.039 in) long. The sepals are 4–6 mm (0.16–0.24 in) long joined at the base with bracteoles on the pedicel. The standard petal is yellow with red markings, the wings yellow and the keel dark reddish with a paler base. Flowering occurs from August to September and the fruit is an oblong to egg-shaped pod 10–30 mm (0.39–1.18 in) long.

== Taxonomy and naming ==
Bossiaea lenticularis was first formally described in 1825 by Augustin Pyramus de Candolle in Prodromus Systematis Naturalis Regni Vegetabilis from an unpublished description by Franz Sieber. The specific epithet (lenticularis) means "lens-shaped".

== Distribution and habitat ==
This bossiaea grows in forest, mainly in the Sydney region and as far inland as Lithgow.
