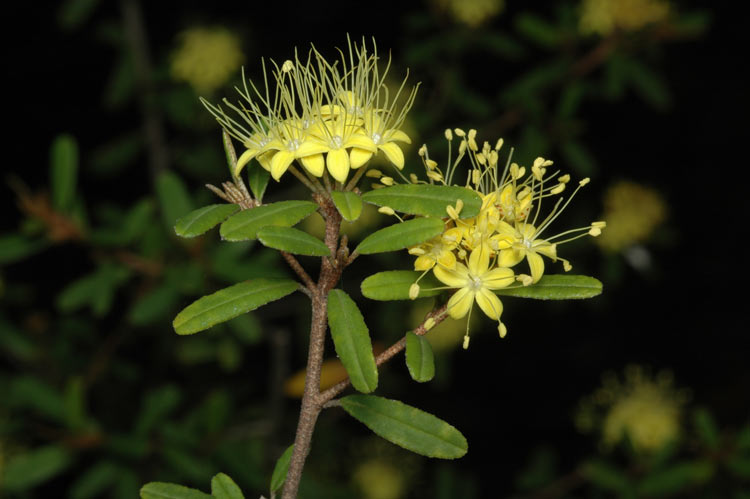
- Phebalium squamulosum subsp. squamulosum in the ANBG

Scientific classification
- Kingdom: Plantae
- Clade: Tracheophytes
- Clade: Angiosperms
- Clade: Eudicots
- Clade: Rosids
- Order: Sapindales
- Family: Rutaceae
- Genus: Phebalium
- Species: P. squamulosum

Binomial name
- Phebalium squamulosum Vent.

Synonyms
- Eriostemon lepidotus Spreng. nom. illeg.; Eriostemon lepidotus Spreng. var. lepidotus

= Phebalium squamulosum =

Scaly phebalium

Species of shrub

Phebalium squamulosum , commonly known as scaly phebalium or forest phebalium, is a species of shrub or slender tree that is endemic to eastern Australia. It has smooth branches covered with rust-coloured scales, linear to elliptical or egg-shaped leaves with the narrower end towards the base, and pale to bright yellow flowers in umbels with rust-coloured or silvery scales on the back.

== Description ==
Phebalium squamulosum is a shrub that typically grows to a height of 3 m (9.8 ft), sometimes a slender tree to 7 m (23 ft). It has smooth branchlets covered with rust-coloured scales. The leaves are papery or leathery, linear to elliptical or egg-shaped with the narrower end towards the base, 7–70 mm (0.28–2.76 in) long and 1.5–8 mm (0.059–0.315 in) wide on a petiole 0.5–4 mm (0.020–0.157 in) long. The upper surface of the leaves is more or less glabrous but the lower side is covered with silvery to rust-coloured scales and star-shaped hairs. Between five and ten or more flowers are arranged in umbels on the ends of branchlets, each flower on a pedicel 3–8 mm (0.12–0.31 in) long. The calyx is hemispherical to top-shaped, 0.5–1.5 mm (0.020–0.059 in) long and 1.2–2 mm (0.047–0.079 in) wide, glabrous on the inside and covered with scales on the outside. The petals are pale to bright yellow or cream-coloured, elliptical, 2–4.5 mm (0.079–0.177 in) long with silvery to rust-coloured scales on the back. The fruit is a follicle about 3.5 mm (0.14 in) long and erect.

== Taxonomy ==
Phebalium squamulosum was first formally described in 1805 by Étienne Pierre Ventenat in his book Jardin de la Malmaison and was the first species in the genus to be described.

In 1970, Paul Wilson described ten subspecies, eight of which are now accepted by the Australian Plant Census:

- P. squamulosum subsp. alpinum (Benth.) Paul G.Wilson
- P. squamulosum subsp. argenteum Paul G.Wilson
- P. squamulosum subsp. coriaceum Paul G.Wilson
- P. squamulosum subsp. gracile Paul G.Wilson
- P. squamulosum subsp. lineare Paul G.Wilson
- P. squamulosum subsp. ozothamnoides (F.Muell.) Paul G.Wilson
- P. squamulosum subsp. parvifolium Paul G.Wilson
- P. squamulosum Vent. subsp. squamulosum

There are many intergrades between subspecies and it is sometimes difficult to satisfactorily assign some plants to a taxon.

== Distribution and habitat ==
Scaly phebalium is widespread, mainly growing in heath and forest on sandstone. It is found in northern and south-eastern Queensland, eastern New South Wales and eastern Victoria.

== Use in horticulture ==
Phebalium squamulosum is cultivated as an ornamental flowering shrub. The species is frost tolerant and performs best in a well-drained, partially shaded position with a cool, moist root zone.

== Image gallery ==
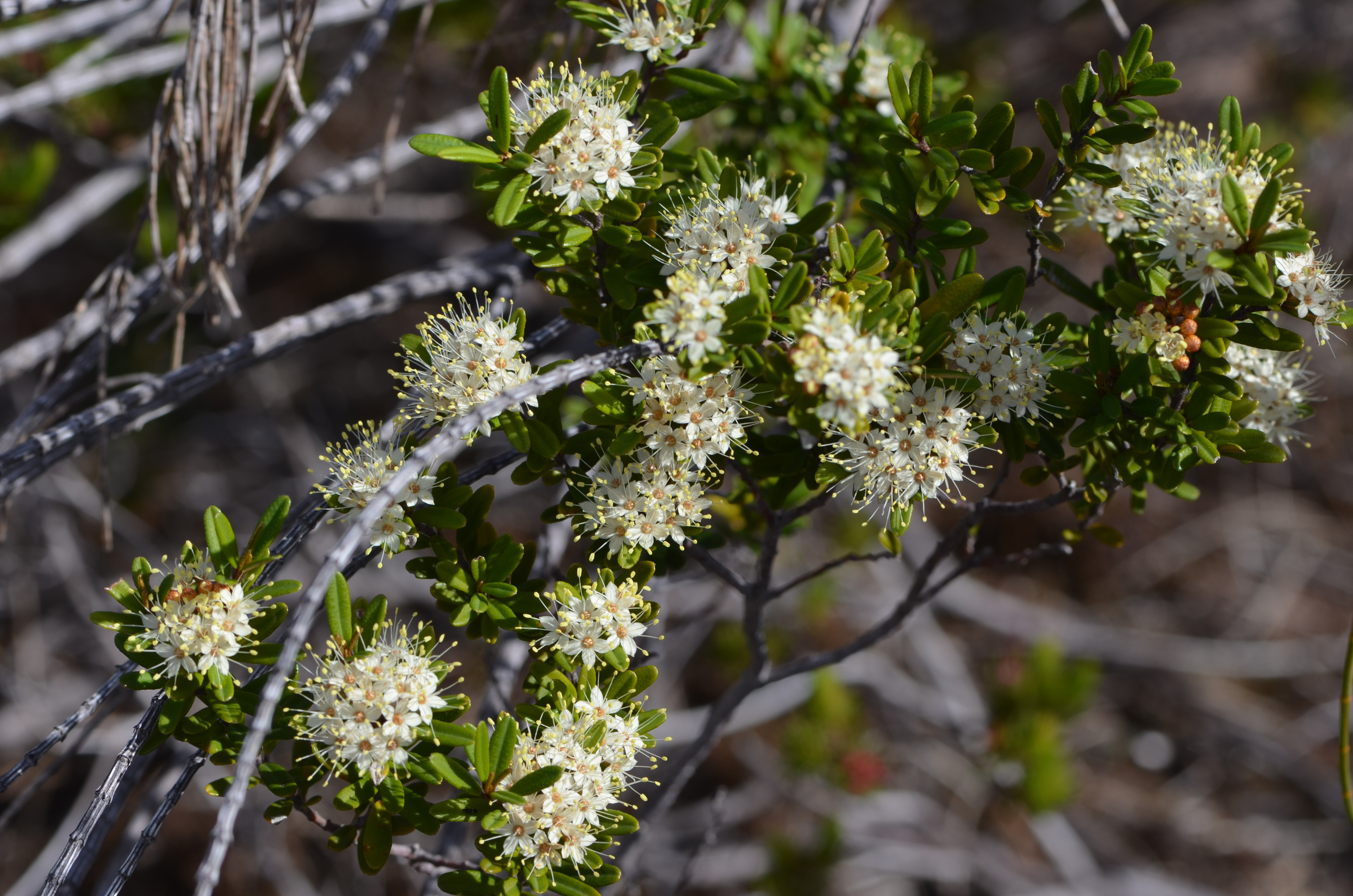
P. squamulosum, Ku-ring-gai Chase National Park, 19 August 2017

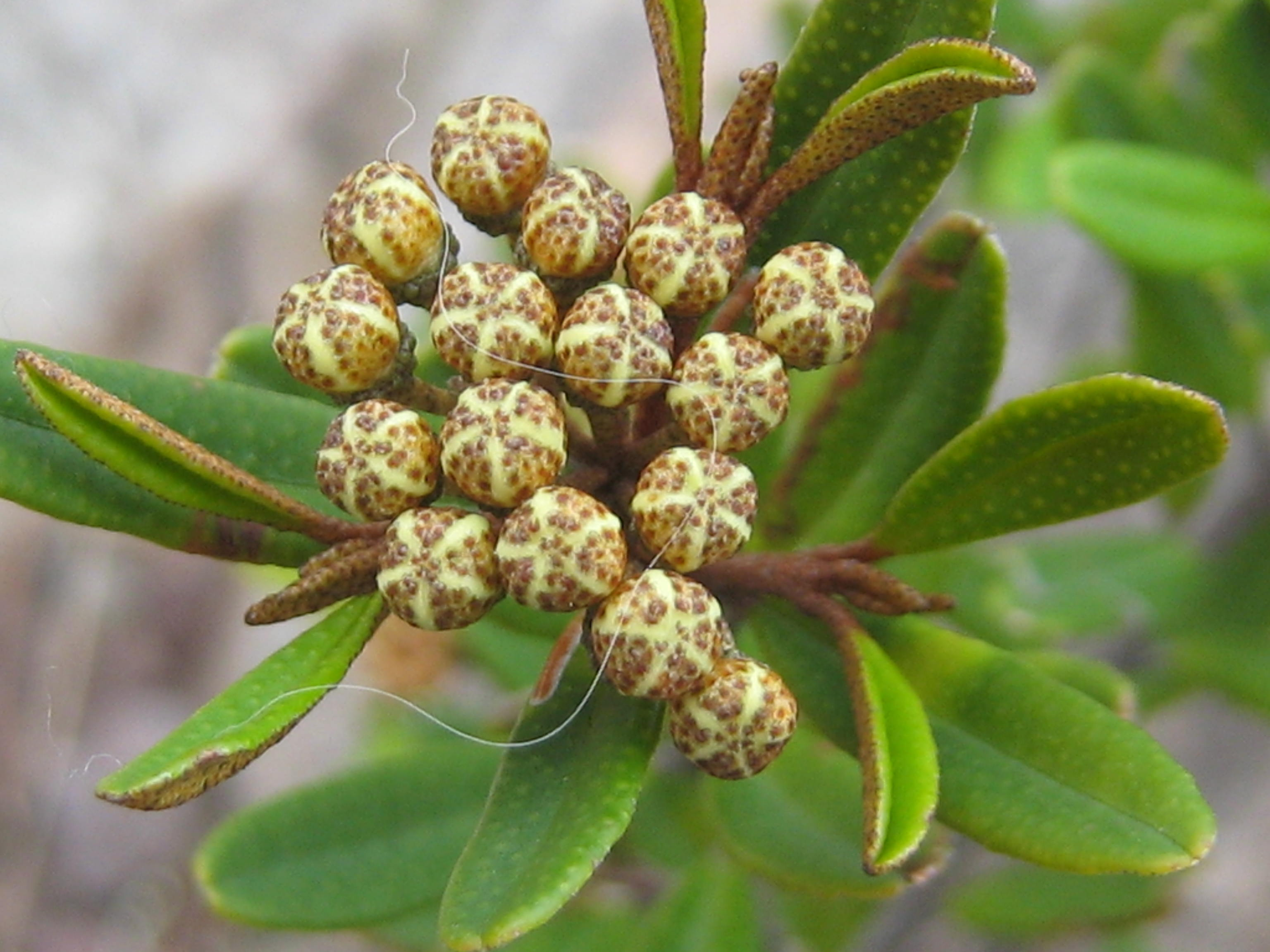
P. squamulosum buds, Ku-ring-gai Chase National Park, 24 July 2011

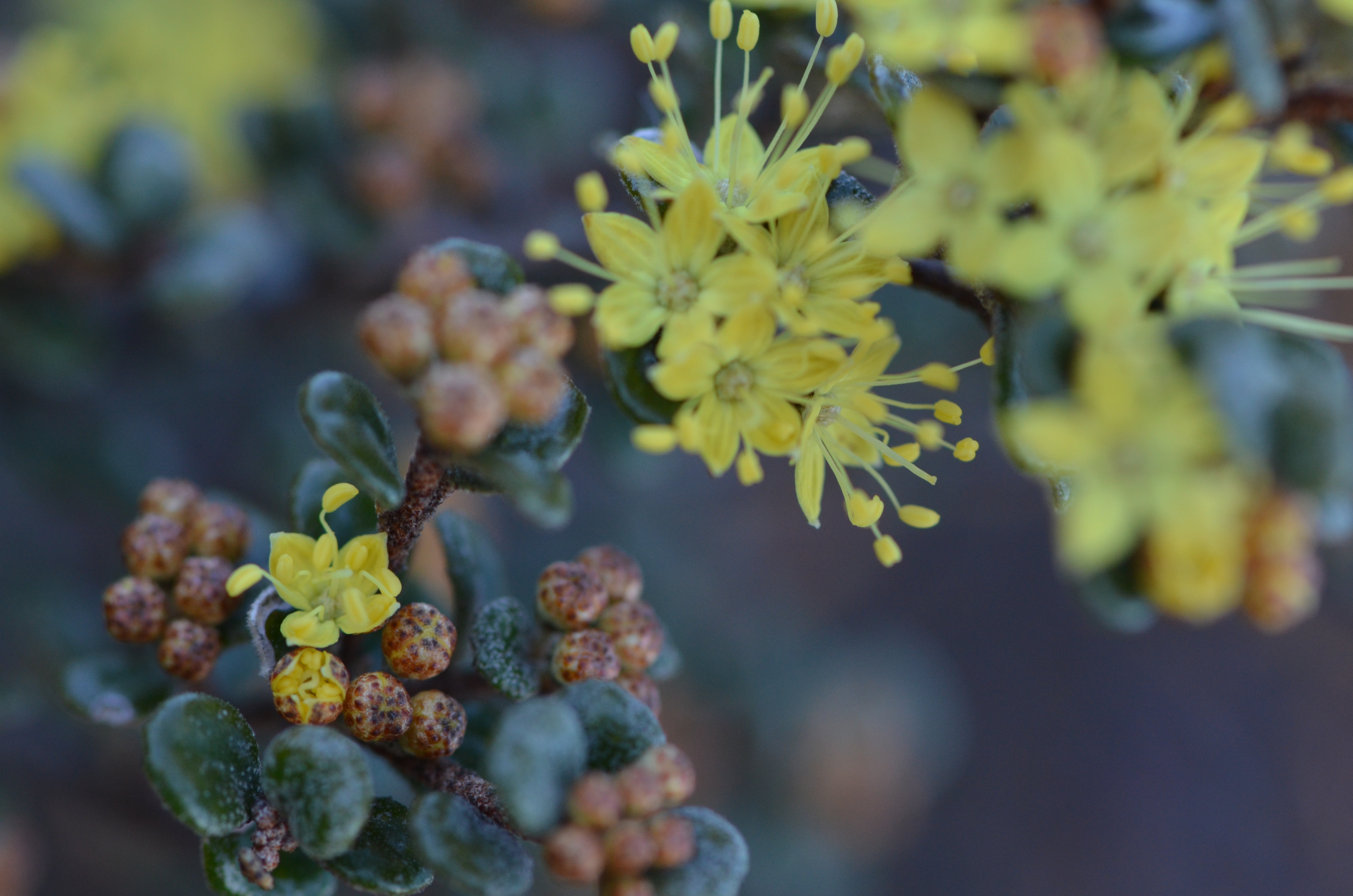
P. squamulosum subsp. ozothamnoides, Hassans Walls near Lithgow, 19 September 2017

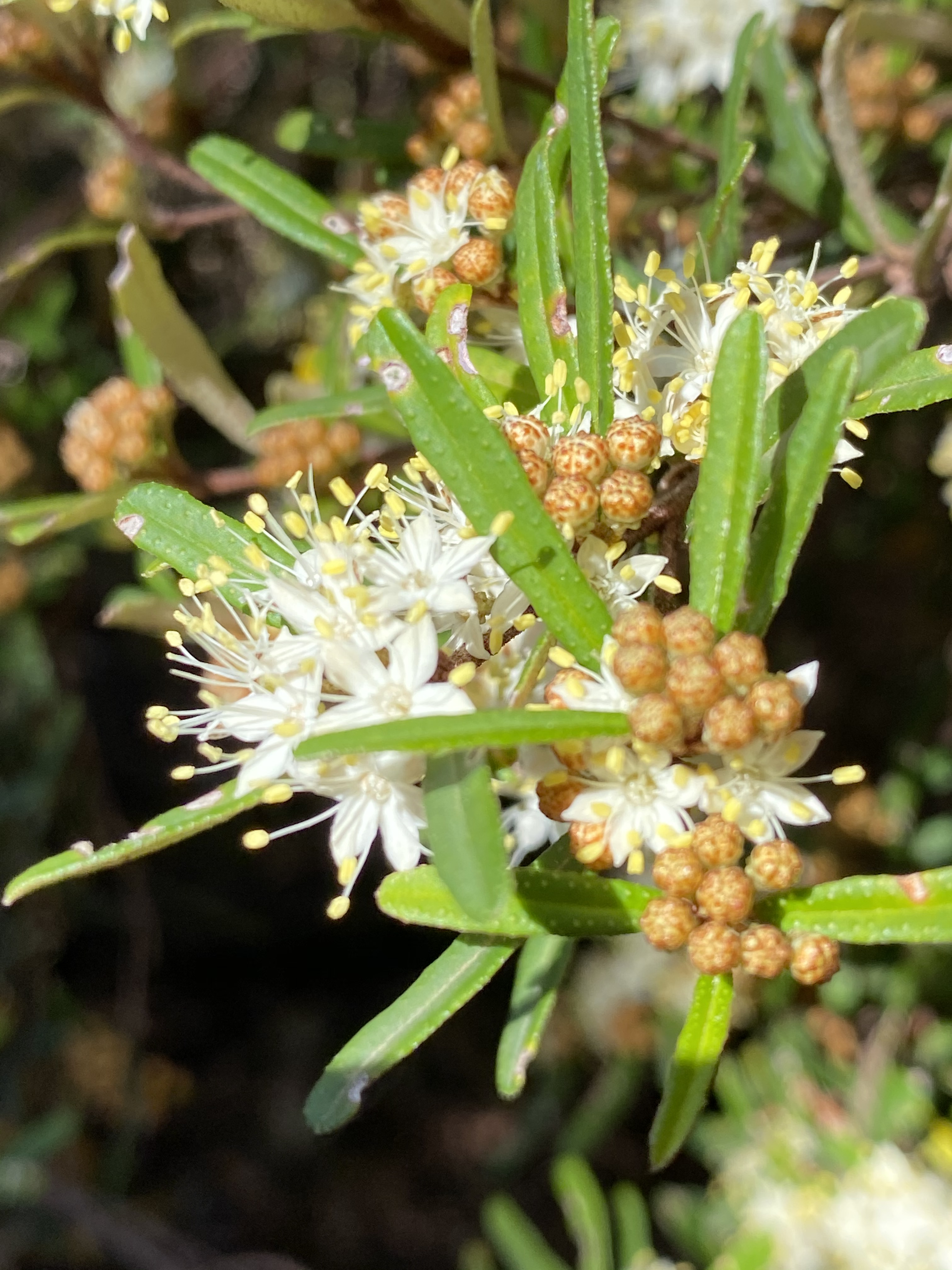
P. squamulosum subsp. gracile, in the ANBG

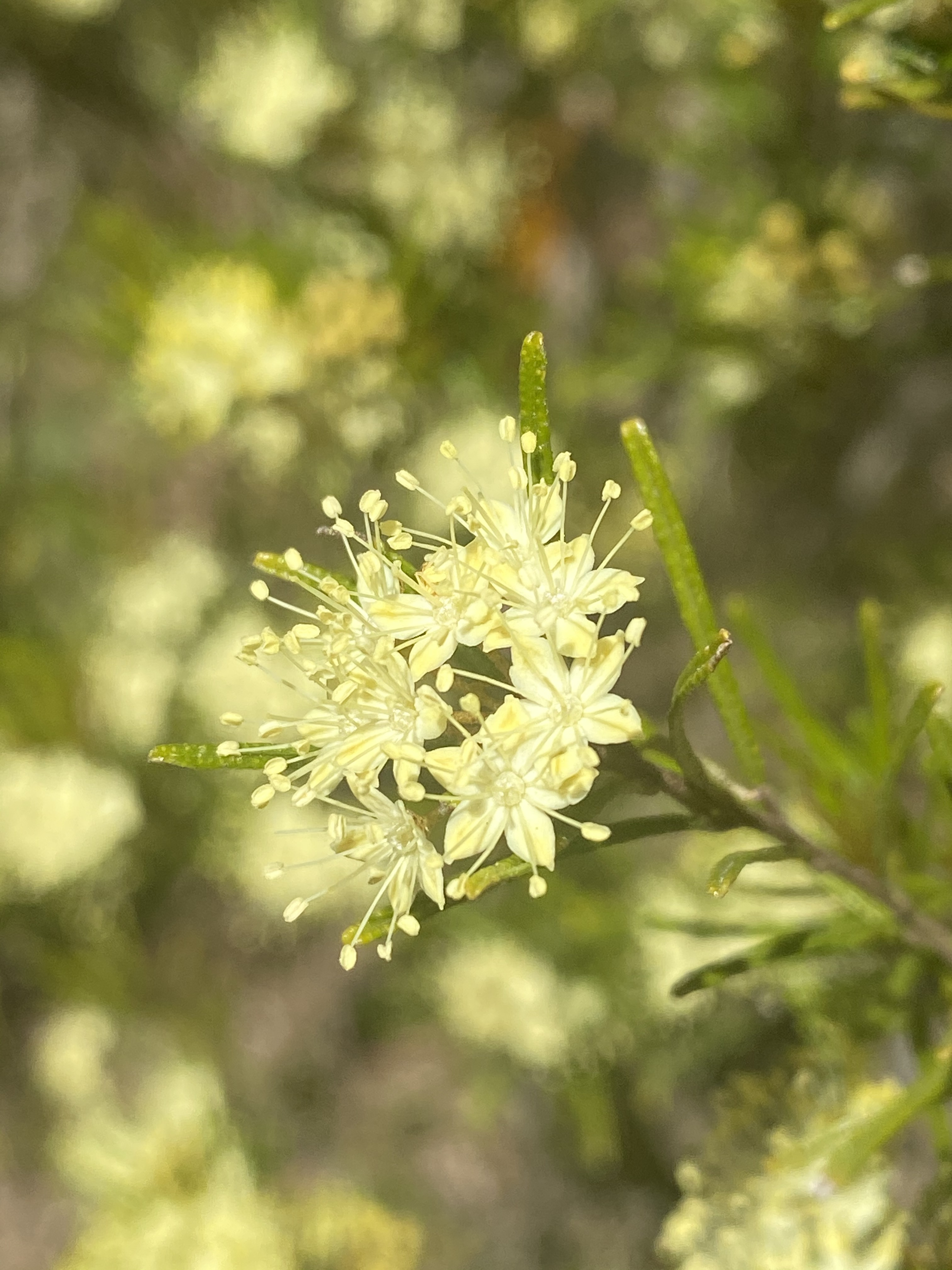
P. squamulosum subsp. lineare, in the ANBG
