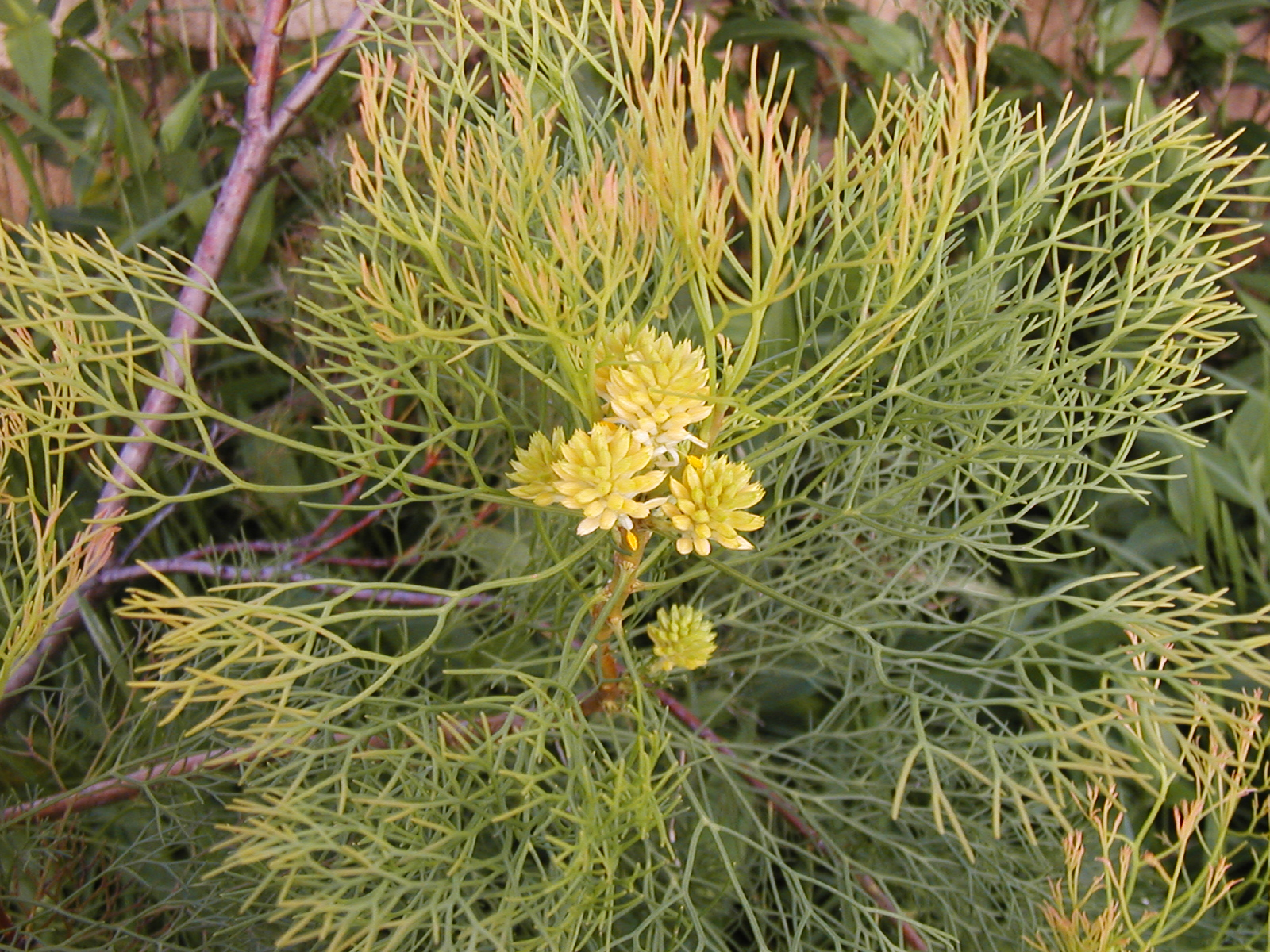
- Petrophile pedunculata

Scientific classification
- Kingdom: Plantae
- Clade: Tracheophytes
- Clade: Angiosperms
- Clade: Eudicots
- Order: Proteales
- Family: Proteaceae
- Genus: Petrophile
- Species: P. pedunculata

Binomial name
- Petrophile pedunculata R.Br.

Synonyms
- Atylus Salisb. nom. rej.; Arthrostygma Steud. nom. inval., pro syn.

= Petrophile pedunculata =

Conesticks

Species of shrub found in eastern Australia

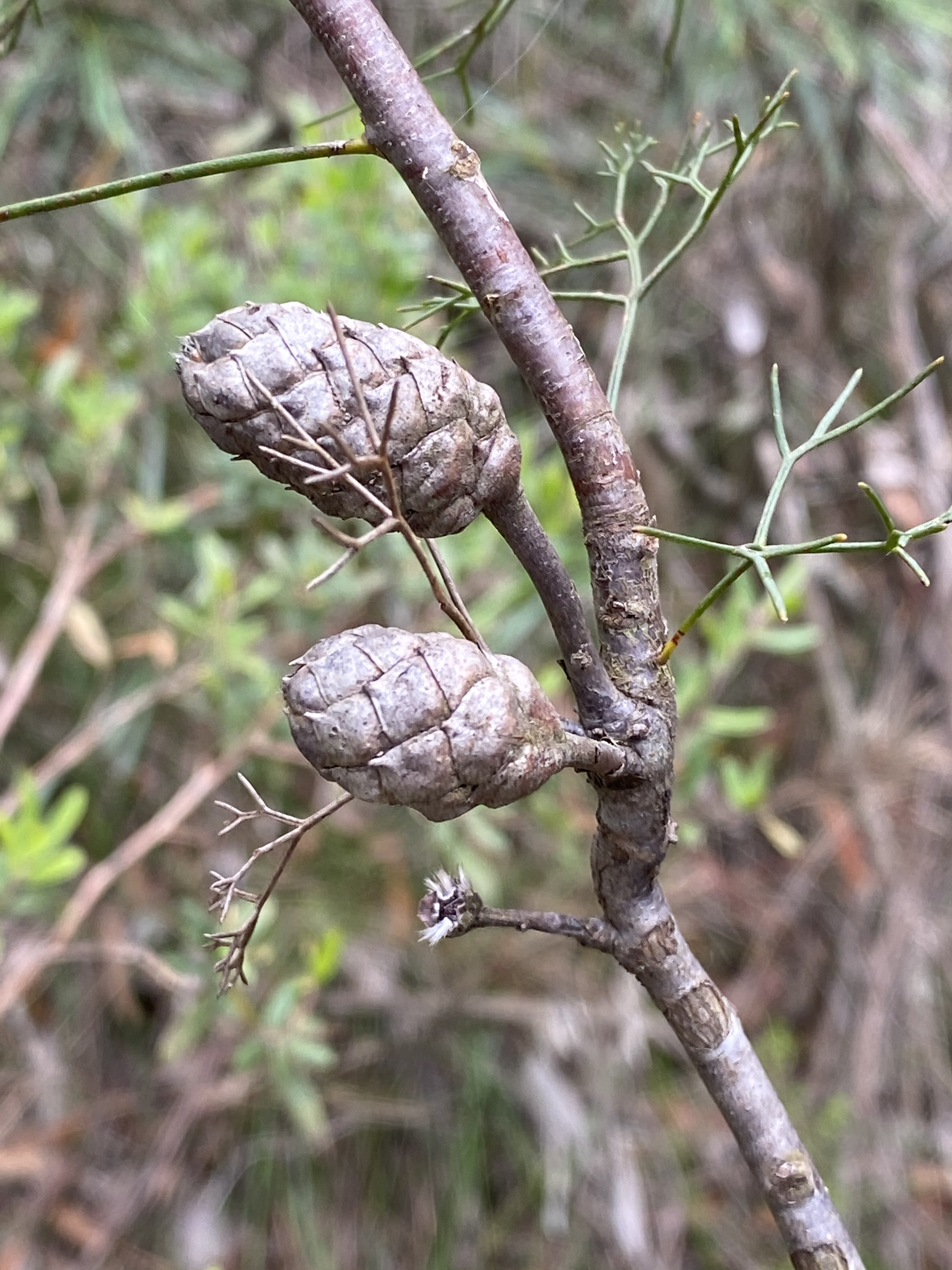
Fruit

Petrophile pedunculata, commonly known as conesticks, is a species of flowering plant in the family Proteaceae and is endemic to New South Wales. It has divided leaves with needle-shaped pinnae and oval heads of sparsely hairy yellow or cream-coloured flowers, the heads on a peduncle 10–15 mm (0.39–0.59 in) long.

== Description ==
Petrophile pedunculata is an erect, spindly to bushy shrub that typically grows to a height of up to 2.5 m (8 ft 2 in) and has glabrous branchlets and leaves. The leaves are pinnate, needle-shaped but not sharply-pointed, 70–185 mm (2.8–7.3 in) long on a petiole 25–95 mm (0.98–3.74 in) long, with pinnae usually less than 20 mm (0.79 in) long. The flowers are arranged in leaf axils in oval heads 10–15 mm (0.39–0.59 in) long on a peduncle 10–15 mm (0.39–0.59 in) long. The flowers are about 7–10 mm (0.28–0.39 in) long, yellow or cream-coloured with a few soft hairs. Flowering occurs from October to January and the fruit is a nut, fused with others in an oval head up to 40 mm (1.6 in) long on a peduncle about 20 mm (0.79 in) long.

This petrophile can be distinguished from the related P. pulchella which has flowers heads that are sessile or on peduncles up to 10 mm (0.39 in) long.

== Taxonomy ==
Petrophile pedunculata was first formally described in 1810 by Robert Brown in the Transactions of the Linnean Society of London from material collected near Port Jackson.

== Distribution and habitat ==
Petrophile pedunculata is found growing on shallow sandstone soils, often in open forest or heathlands. It is common along the coast of New South Wales between Port Jackson and Milton and on the ranges between the Blue Mountains and Marulan.
