= Systema Vegetabilium =

Book by Carl Linnaeus

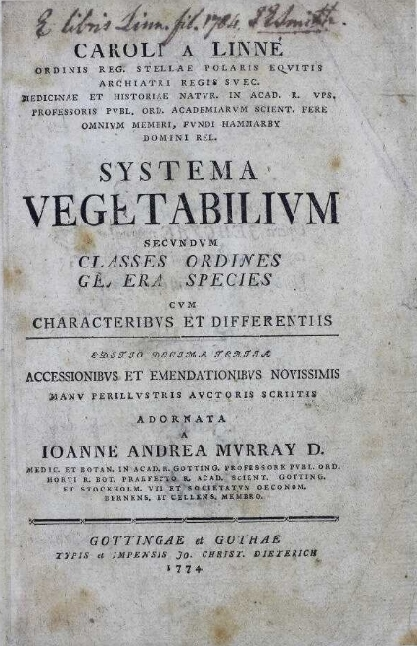
The title page of Systema Vegetabilium (1774)

Systema Vegetabilium (abbreviated as Syst. Veg.) is a book published in four editions, following twelve earlier editions known as Systema Naturae. The first edition, published in 1774 and edited by Johan Andreas Murray is counted as edition 13 because it continues from the 12th edition of Systema Naturae. All the names in it are attributed to Carl Linnaeus. The second edition, (counted as the 14th of Systema Naturae) published in 1784, includes plant species described by J.A. Murray and Carl Peter Thunberg. The third edition (counted as the 15th) was edited by Christiaan Hendrik Persoon.

Although the fourth edition, purportedly the 16th edition of Linnaeus's work was published in five volumes between 1824 and 1828, and attributed to Kurt Sprengel, the International Plant Names Index suggests that it should be counted as edition 17.

The 16th edition (abbreviated as Syst. Veg., ed. 15 bis [Roemer & Schultes]) was written jointly by Johann Jacob Roemer, Josef August Schultes and Julius Hermann Schultes. It was published in seven volumes between 1817 and 1830 under the name Systema Vegetabilium: Secundum Classes, Ordines, Genera, Species. Cum characteribus differentiis et synonymis. Nova Editio, speciebus inde ab Editione XV. Detectis aucta et locupletata.

== Volumes of the Roemer and Schultes edition ==
- Nº 1: Jan-Jun 1817;
- Nº 2: Nov 1817;
- Nº 3: Jul 1818;
- Nº 4: Jan-Jun 1819;
- Nº 5: finnish de 1819 ou early de 1820; by J. A. Schultes
- Nº 6: Ago-Dez 1820; por J. A. Schultes
- Nº 7(1): 1829; por J. A. & J. H. Schultes;
- Nº 7(2): finnish de 1830
