= Hypocalymma connatum =

Conservation status
- Priority One — Poorly Known Taxa (DEC)

Scientific classification
- Kingdom: Plantae
- Clade: Embryophytes
- Clade: Tracheophytes
- Clade: Spermatophytes
- Clade: Angiosperms
- Clade: Eudicots
- Clade: Rosids
- Order: Myrtales
- Family: Myrtaceae
- Genus: Hypocalymma
- Species: H. connatum

Binomial name
- Hypocalymma connatum Strid & Keighery

Species of flowering plant

Hypocalymma connatum is a species of flowering in the myrtle family Myrtaceae, and is endemic to Western Australia. It is a shrub, with narrowly egg-shaped leaves, probably white flowers, but has not been collected since 1935.

== Description ==
Hypocalymma connatum is a shrub that typically grows to a height of up to 40 cm (16 in). Its leaves are narrowly egg-shaped, 6–7 mm (0.24–0.28 in) long and 1.0–1.5 mm (0.039–0.059 in) wide on a petiole 0.5 mm (0.020 in) long. The edges of the leaves are strongly curved downwards or rolled under with usually 8 to 15 oil glands on either side of the mid-vein. The flowers are arranged singly or in pairs in leaf axils on a peduncle 3–4 mm (0.12–0.16 in) long, with small bracteoles, each flower on a pedicel 0.7–1 mm (0.028–0.039 in) long. The sepals are very broadly egg-shaped, 2.0–2.5 mm (0.079–0.098 in) long and up to 3.2 mm (0.13 in) wide and whitish or tinged with red. The petals are 3.5–4.0 mm (0.14–0.16 in) in diameter and probably white. There are about 17 stamens with the filaments about 3 mm (0.12 in) long and joined for about half their length. The fruit is a capsule about 3.5 mm (0.14 in) long.

== Taxonomy ==
Hypocalymma connatum was first formally described in 2003 by Arne Strid and Greg Keighery in the Nordic Journal of Botany from a specimen exhibited at a wildflower show in Perth in 1938. The specific epithet (connatum) means 'joined together', especially at the base, and refers to the stamens.

== Distribution ==
The distribution and habitat of this species are unknown. Charles Gardner acquired the specimen from the wildflower show, and Barbara Rye and others suggested in the journal Nuytsia, that the specimen may have been collected with Hypocalymma verticillare in the high rainfall areas in the south-west of Western Australia.

== Conservation status ==
Hypocalymma connatum is listed as "Priority One" by the Government of Western Australia Department of Biodiversity, Conservation and Attractions, meaning that it is known from only one or a few locations where it is potentially at risk.
