= Styphelia conchifolia =

Scientific classification
- Kingdom: Plantae
- Clade: Tracheophytes
- Clade: Angiosperms
- Clade: Eudicots
- Clade: Asterids
- Order: Ericales
- Family: Ericaceae
- Genus: Styphelia
- Species: S. conchifolia

Binomial name
- Styphelia conchifolia (Strid) Hislop, Crayn & Puente-Lel.
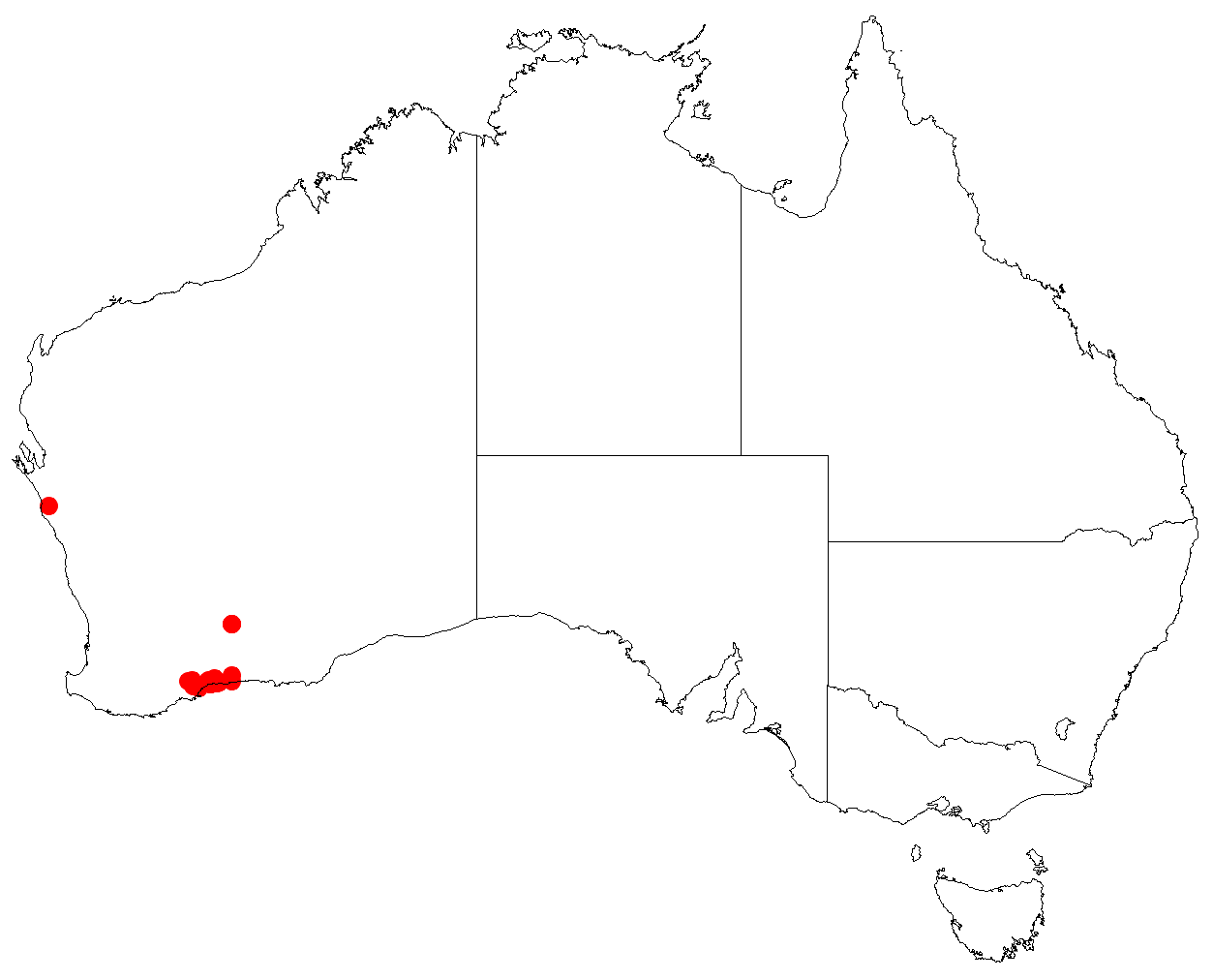
- Occurrence data from AVH

Synonyms
- Leucopogon conchifolius Strid

Species of plant

Styphelia conchifolia is a species of flowering plant in the heath family Ericaceae and is endemic to the south-west of Western Australia. It is an erect shrublet with many branches, more or less round leaves near the ends of branchlets, and white, tube-shaped flowers arranged near the ends of leafy twigs.

== Description ==
Styphelia conchifolia is an erect, slender shrublet that typically grows to a height of 40–80 cm (16–31 in) and has many branches. The leaves are more or less round, 2.2–3.0 mm (0.087–0.118 in) long and wide on a petiole about 0.5 mm (0.020 in) long. The flowers are arranged singly, in pairs or threes in leaf axils near the ends of branchlets, with small egg-shaped, pale green bracts and broadly egg-shaped to round bracteoles. The sepals are triangular, about 2.4 mm (0.094 in) long, the petals white and joined at the base to form a tube 1.5–2.0 mm (0.059–0.079 in) long, the lobes slightly longer than the petal tube and densely bearded on the inside. Flowering peaks in mid-March.

== Taxonomy and naming ==
Styphelia conchifolia was first formally described in 1986 by Arne Strid in the journal Willdenowia from specimens he collected in the Fitzgerald River National Park in 1983. In 2020, Michael Hislop, Darren M. Crayn and Caroline Puente-Lelievre transferred the species to Styphelia as S. conchifolia. The specific epithet (conchifolia) means "oyster shell-leaved".

== Distribution and habitat ==
This styphelia grows in heath in the Esperance Plains bioregion of south-western Western Australia.

== Conservation status ==
Styphelia conchifolia is classified as "not threatened" by the Western Australian Government Department of Biodiversity, Conservation and Attractions.
