= Hypocalymma melaleucoides =

Conservation status
- Priority Two — Poorly Known Taxa (DEC)

Scientific classification
- Kingdom: Plantae
- Clade: Tracheophytes
- Clade: Angiosperms
- Clade: Eudicots
- Clade: Rosids
- Order: Myrtales
- Family: Myrtaceae
- Genus: Hypocalymma
- Species: H. melaleucoides

Binomial name
- Hypocalymma melaleucoides (C.A.Gardner) Strid & Keighery

Species of flowering plant

Hypocalymma melaleucoides, commonly known as Fitzgerald myrtle, is a member of the family Myrtaceae and is endemic to the Fitzgerald River National Park in the south of Western Australia. It is a spreading shrub with linear leaves that are round in cross-section, and bright pink flowers, with 35 to 55 stamens in several rows.

== Description ==
Hypocalymma melaleucoides is a spreading shrub that typically grows to a height of up to 30–70 cm (12–28 in). Its leaves are spreading or erect, linear, 4–6 mm (0.16–0.24 in) long, 1.5–2.0 mm (0.059–0.079 in) wide on a petiole 0.5–0.9 mm (0.020–0.035 in) long and round in cross-section with many small oil glands. The flowers are borne singly in leaf axils and are 13–17 mm (0.51–0.67 in) in diameter, on a peduncle 0.5–2 mm (0.020–0.079 in) long. The flowers are bright pink, each flower on a pedicel up to about 1 mm (0.039 in) long. The floral tube is 1.5–2.0 mm (0.059–0.079 in) long and about 3 mm (0.12 in) wide and the sepal lobes are egg-shaped, 1–2 mm (0.039–0.079 in) long and 2.3–2.7 mm (0.091–0.106 in) wide. The petals are bright pink, 6–8 mm (0.24–0.31 in) long and there are 35 to 55 stamens in several rows, the longest filaments 3–4 mm (0.12–0.16 in) long and pink. Flowering occurs in September and October and the fruit is 3.0–3.5 mm (0.12–0.14 in) long and about 5 mm (0.20 in) wide.

== Taxonomy ==
Hypocalymma melaleucoides was first formally described in 2003 by Arne Strid and Gregory John Keighery from an unpublished description by Charles Gardner, in the Nordic Journal of Botany from a specimen collected 1 km (0.62 mi) south of Quoin Head in the Fitzgerald River National Park. The specific epithet (melaleucoides) means 'Melaleuca-like', referring to the leaf-covered branches, superficially resembling some species of Melaleuca.

== Distribution and habitat ==
Fitzgerald myrtle grows in heath on coastal slopes and headlands, and is known from a few collections in the Fitzgerald River National Park in the south of Western Australia, where it grows in sandy to loamy soils over quartzite.

== Conservation status ==
Hypocalymma melaleucoides is listed as "Priority Two" by the Government of Western Australia Department of Biodiversity, Conservation and Attractions, meaning that it is poorly known and from one or a few locations.
