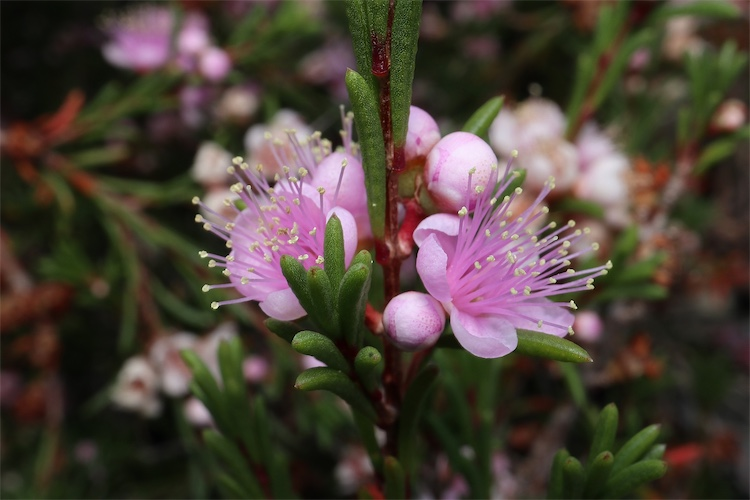
- In the ANBG

Scientific classification
- Kingdom: Plantae
- Clade: Tracheophytes
- Clade: Angiosperms
- Clade: Eudicots
- Clade: Rosids
- Order: Myrtales
- Family: Myrtaceae
- Genus: Hypocalymma
- Species: H. jessicae

Binomial name
- Hypocalymma jessicae Strid & Keighery

= Hypocalymma jessicae =

Species of flowering plant

Hypocalymma jessicae, commonly known as Barrens myrtle, is a species of flowering plant in the myrtle family Myrtaceae, and is endemic to the south west of Western Australia. It is an erect, spreading shrub, with narrowly egg-shaped leaves with the narrower end towards the base, and pale to bright pink flowers mostly arranged in pairs in leaf axils, with 35 to 100 stamens in several rows.

== Description ==
Hypocalymma jessicae is an erect, spreading shrub that typically grows to a height of 0.3–1.2 m (1 ft 0 in – 3 ft 11 in) high and 1.2–1.5 cm (0.47–0.59 in) wide. Its leaves are narrowly egg-shaped with the narrower end towards the base or linear, 5–15 mm (0.20–0.59 in) long, 0.5–1 mm (0.020–0.039 in) wide and 0.4–1 mm (0.016–0.039 in) thick on a petiole 0.4–1.3 mm (0.016–0.051 in) long. Both sides of the leaves are the same shade of green and there are 2 main rows of oil glands on the lower surface. The flowers are 8.0–10.5 mm (0.31–0.41 in) in diameter, mostly borne in pairs in leaf axils on a peduncle 1–2.5 mm (0.039–0.098 in) long, each flower on a pedicel 0.3–0.8 mm (0.012–0.031 in) long, with bracteoles 1.3–1.8 mm (0.051–0.071 in) long but that fall off as the flowers open. The floral tube is 1.3–2.0 mm (0.051–0.079 in) long and 2.5–3.5 mm (0.098–0.138 in) in diameter and the sepal lobes are broadly egg-shaped, 1.1–1.6 mm (0.043–0.063 in) long, 1.5–2.3 mm (0.059–0.091 in) wide. The petals are pale to bright pink, 3.0–4.0 mm (0.12–0.16 in) long and there are 35 to 100 pink stamens in several rows, the longest filaments 4.0–5.5 mm (0.16–0.22 in) long. Flowering occurs throughout the year, and the fruit is a capsule 2.5–3.75 mm (0.098–0.148 in) long and 3.0–3.5 mm (0.12–0.14 in) in diameter.

== Taxonomy ==
Hypocalymma jessicae was first formally described in 2003 by Arne Strid and Gregory John Keighery in the Nordic Journal of Botany from specimens collected on the south-east side of East Mount Barren by Arne Strid in 1983. The specific epithet (jessicae) honours Jessica Strid, who assisted in the field in locating the species with her father.

== Distribution and habitat ==
This species of Hypocalymma grows in shallow sand on rocky outcrops in the Ravensthorpe Range and Fitzgerald River National Park in the Esperance Plains bioregion of south-western Western Australia.
