= Leucopogon lloydiorum =

Scientific classification
- Kingdom: Plantae
- Clade: Tracheophytes
- Clade: Angiosperms
- Clade: Eudicots
- Clade: Asterids
- Order: Ericales
- Family: Ericaceae
- Genus: Leucopogon
- Species: L. lloydiorum

Binomial name
- Leucopogon lloydiorum Strid
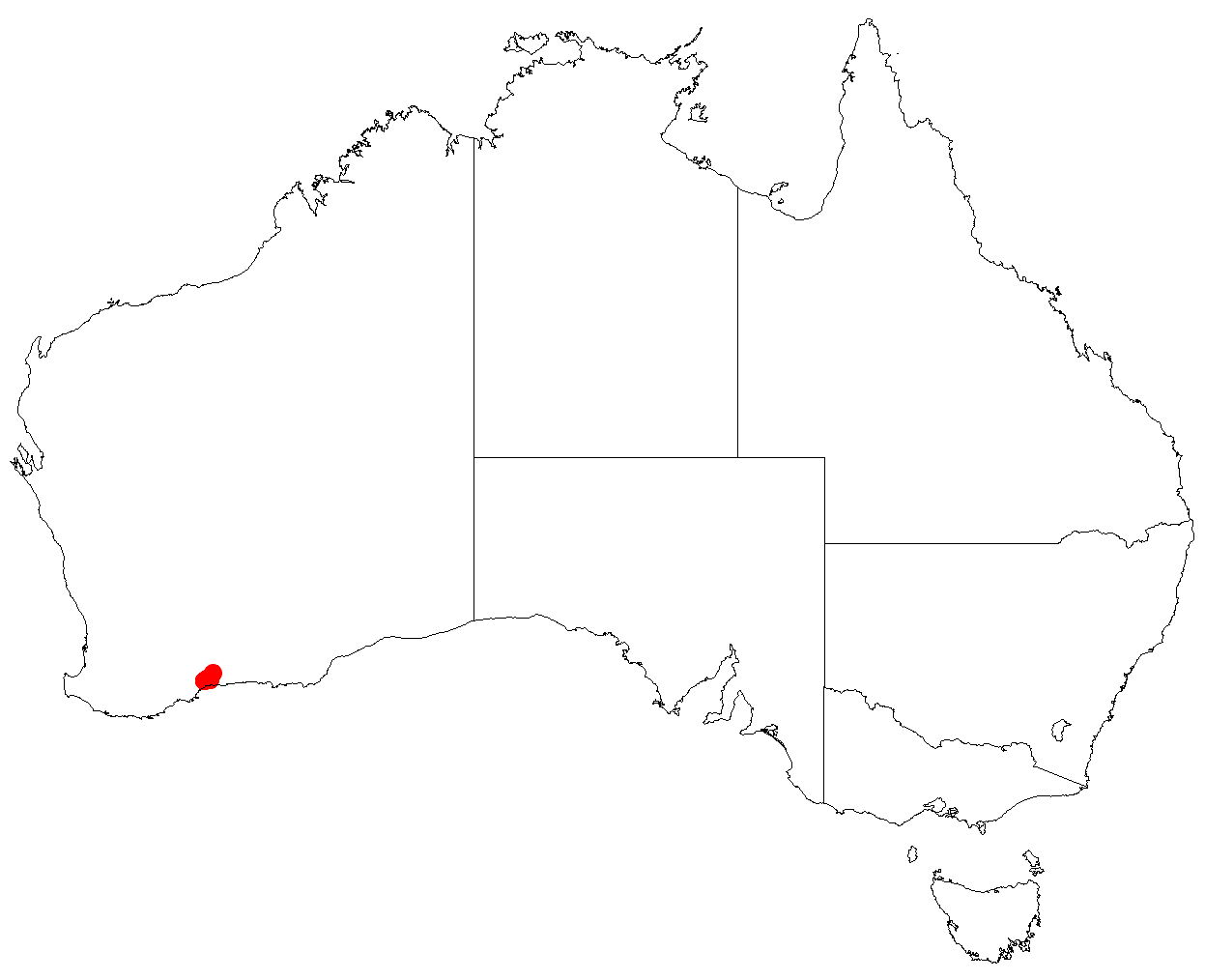
- Occurrence data from AVH

Species of plant

Leucopogon lloydiorum is a species of flowering plant in the heath family Ericaceae and is endemic to the south-west of Western Australia. It is a slender shrub with elliptic leaves clustered near the ends of branchlets, and white, densely-bearded, tube-shaped flowers.

== Description ==
Leucopogon lloydiorum is a slender shrub that typically grows to a height of about 1 m (3 ft 3 in), its leaves clustered near the ends of twigs. The leaves are elliptic, 5–9 mm (0.20–0.35 in) long and 3–4.5 mm (0.12–0.18 in) wide on a petiole about 1 mm (0.039 in) long. The upper surface of the leaves is glabrous and the lower surface has several prominent longitudinal veins. The flowers are arranged on the ends of branches and in leaf axils in a spike 3–4 mm (0.12–0.16 in) long with 5 to 9 flowers with egg-shaped bracts about 1.5 mm (0.059 in) long and broader bracteoles. The sepals are lance-shaped, 2.8–3.2 mm (0.11–0.13 in) long, the petals white and joined at the base to form a tube about 1.6 mm (0.063 in) long, the lobes twice as long as the petal tube and densely bearded. Flowering has been observed in March.

== Taxonomy and naming ==
Leucopogon lloydiorum was first formally described in 1986 by Arne Strid in the journal Willdenowia from specimens he collected near the Fitzgerald River National Park in 1983. The specific epithet (lloydiorum) honours Martin Lloyd, the ranger in the Fitzgerald River National Park, and his wife Viv.

== Distribution and habitat ==
This leucopogon grows on white sand in the Esperance Plains bioregion of south-western Western Australia. The type specimen was growing in low mallee heath.

== Conservation status ==
Leucopogon lloydiorum is classified as "not threatened" by the Western Australian Government Department of Biodiversity, Conservation and Attractions.
