= Hypocalymma uncinatum =

Scientific classification
- Kingdom: Plantae
- Clade: Tracheophytes
- Clade: Angiosperms
- Clade: Eudicots
- Clade: Rosids
- Order: Myrtales
- Family: Myrtaceae
- Genus: Hypocalymma
- Species: H. uncinatum

Binomial name
- Hypocalymma uncinatum Strid & Keighery

Species of flowering plant

Hypocalymma uncinatum is a species of flowering plant in the myrtle family Myrtaceae, and is endemic to the south-west of Western Australia. It is an erect shrub, with linear leaves, and white flowers with 25 to 35 stamens.

== Description ==
Hypocalymma uncinatum is an erect shrub that typically grows to 0.7–2.5 m (2 ft 4 in – 8 ft 2 in) high, 0.9–1.2 m (2 ft 11 in – 3 ft 11 in) wide and has glabrous young stems. Its leaves are linear in outline, 18–30 mm (0.71–1.18 in) long, 0.5–1.3 mm (0.020–0.051 in) wide and 0.3–0.6 mm (0.012–0.024 in) thick. The lower side of the leaves is deeply convex with many oil glands. The flowers are 7–9 mm (0.28–0.35 in) in diameter, and often arranged in pairs with bracteoles 1.5–2.5 mm (0.059–0.098 in) long at the base. The floral tube is about 1.0–1.5 mm (0.039–0.059 in) long and about 3 mm (0.12 in) wide and the sepals are broadly egg-shaped, 1.5–2.3 mm (0.059–0.091 in) long and 2.3–2.7 mm (0.091–0.106 in) wide. The petals are white, 3.0–3.5 mm (0.12–0.14 in) long and there are 25 to 35 white stamens, the longest filaments 3.5–4.0 mm (0.14–0.16 in) long. Flowering mainly occurs from June to early October, and the fruit is a capsule 2.0–2.5 mm (0.079–0.098 in) long and 3.0–3.5 mm (0.12–0.14 in) in diameter.

== Taxonomy ==
Hypocalymma uncinatum was first formally described in 2003 by Arne Strid and Greg Keighery in the Nordic Journal of Botany from specimens collected on south-east of Muntadgin in 1963. The specific epithet (uncinatum) means 'hooked' or 'barbed', referring to the tips of the leaves.

== Distribution and habitat ==
This species of Hypocalymma grows on granite outcrops in woodland, thicket or scrub between Merredin and Lake King in the Avon Wheatbelt and Mallee bioregions of south-western Western Australia, where it grows in sandy or loamy soils with lateritic gravel.

== Conservation status ==
Hypocalymma uncinatum is listed as "not threatened" by the Government of Western Australia Department of Biodiversity, Conservation and Attractions.
