= Hypocalymma gardneri =

Conservation status
- Priority Three — Poorly Known Taxa (DEC)

Scientific classification
- Kingdom: Plantae
- Clade: Tracheophytes
- Clade: Angiosperms
- Clade: Eudicots
- Clade: Rosids
- Order: Myrtales
- Family: Myrtaceae
- Genus: Hypocalymma
- Species: H. gardneri

Binomial name
- Hypocalymma gardneri Strid & Keighery

Synonyms
- Hypocalymma xanthopetalum var. linearifolium Paczk. & A.R.Chapm. nom. inval.; Hypocalymma xanthopetalum var. linearifolium Strid & Keighery manuscript name; Hypocalymma xanthopetalum var. nov. (C.A.Gardner 9096)

Species of flowering plant

Hypocalymma gardneri is a species of flowering plant in the myrtle family Myrtaceae, and is endemic to the south west of Western Australia. It is a widely spreading subshrub, with linear leaves and yellow flowers arranged in pairs in leaf axils, with 80 to 105 stamens in several rows.

== Description ==
Hypocalymma gardneri is a widely spreading subshrub with many branches and that typically grows to a height of up to 10–30 cm (3.9–11.8 in) and 30–50 cm (12–20 in) wide. Its leaves are arranged in opposite pairs, narrowly linear, 14–23 mm (0.55–0.91 in) long and 0.4–1.5 mm (0.016–0.059 in) wide on a petiole 0.3–0.5 mm (0.012–0.020 in) long. Both sides of the leaves are same shade of green and there are many tiny oil glands on the lower surface. The flowers are sessile and usually arranged in pairs in leaf axils with bracteoles 1.5–2.5 mm (0.059–0.098 in) long. The floral tube is 1.3–1.5 mm (0.051–0.059 in) long and 3.5–4.0 mm (0.14–0.16 in) in diameter and the sepal lobes are 1.3–2.0 mm (0.051–0.079 in) long and 2.2–3.5 mm (0.087–0.138 in) wide with toothed edges. The petals are yellow, 3.0–3.5 mm (0.12–0.14 in) long and there are usually 80 to 105 yellow stamens in several rows, the longest filaments about 3.5 mm (0.14 in) long. Flowering mainly occurs between July and September and the fruit is a capsule 2.5–3.5 mm (0.098–0.138 in) long and 4.5–5.5 mm (0.18–0.22 in) in diameter.

== Taxonomy ==
Hypocalymma gardneri was first formally described in 2003 by Arne Strid and Gregory John Keighery in the Nordic Journal of Botany from specimens collected near Mount Peron by Charles Gardner in the Lesueur National Park in 1948. The specific epithet (gardneri) honours the collector of the type of this species.

== Distribution and habitat ==
This species of Hypocalymma grows in open sandplain heath on sandy lateritic soils between Dongara and the Hill River area, in the Geraldton Sandplains bioregion of the south-west of Western Australia.
