= Hypocalymma tenuatum =

Conservation status
- Priority Two — Poorly Known Taxa (DEC)

Scientific classification
- Kingdom: Plantae
- Clade: Tracheophytes
- Clade: Angiosperms
- Clade: Eudicots
- Clade: Rosids
- Order: Myrtales
- Family: Myrtaceae
- Genus: Hypocalymma
- Species: H. tenuatum

Binomial name
- Hypocalymma tenuatum Strid & Keighery

Species of flowering plant

Hypocalymma tenuatum, commonly known as Lesueur myrtle, is a species of flowering plant in the myrtle family Myrtaceae, and is endemic to the a restricted area in the south-west of Western Australia. It is a low, spreading shrub, with linear leaves, and white or pale yellow flowers with 20 to 25 stamens.

== Description ==
Hypocalymma tenuatum is a low, spreading shrub that typically grows to a height of 20–35 cm (7.9–13.8 in). Its leaves are linear in outline, 6–9 mm (0.24–0.35 in) long, 0.5–1.3 mm (0.020–0.051 in) wide and 0.4–0.7 mm (0.016–0.028 in) thick. The lower side of the leaves is deeply convex and grooved, with star-like oil glands. The flowers are 5–6 mm (0.20–0.24 in) in diameter, and often arranged in pairs with bracteoles 0.6–1.5 mm (0.024–0.059 in) long at the base. The floral tube is about 1.0–1.3 mm (0.039–0.051 in) long and 2.5 mm (0.098 in) wide and the sepals are egg-shaped, 0.8–1.2 mm (0.031–0.047 in) long and 1.5–2.0 mm (0.059–0.079 in) wide. The petals are white or pale yellow, 2.0–2.5 mm (0.079–0.098 in) long and there are 20 to 25 white or pale yellow stamens, the longest filaments 3.0–3.8 mm (0.12–0.15 in) long. Flowering mainly occurs from August to October, and the fruit is a capsule 2.3–2.7 mm (0.091–0.106 in) long and 2.0–2.5 mm (0.079–0.098 in) in diameter.

== Taxonomy ==
Hypocalymma tenuatum was first formally described in 2003 by Arne Strid and Greg Keighery in the Nordic Journal of Botany from specimens collected on Mount Lesueur in 1980. The specific epithet (tenuatum) means 'completely slender', referring to the drawn-out branches.

== Distribution and habitat ==
This species of Hypocalymma is found with laterite in wandoo woodland or on sandstone outcrops between the Lesueur National Park and Warradarge in the Geraldton Sandplains bioregion of south-western Western Australia.

== Conservation status ==
Hypocalymma tenuatum is listed as "Priority Two" by the Government of Western Australia Department of Biodiversity, Conservation and Attractions, meaning that it is poorly known and from one or a few locations.
