= Hypocalymma minus =

Scientific classification
- Kingdom: Plantae
- Clade: Tracheophytes
- Clade: Angiosperms
- Clade: Eudicots
- Clade: Rosids
- Order: Myrtales
- Family: Myrtaceae
- Genus: Hypocalymma
- Species: H. minus

Binomial name
- Hypocalymma minus (Strid & Keighery) Keighery

Synonyms
- Hypocalymma cordifolium subsp. minus Strid & Keighery; Hypocalymma sp. Scott River (A.S.George 11773) WA Herbarium

Species of flowering plant

Hypocalymma minus is a species of flowering plant in the myrtle family Myrtaceae, and is endemic to the south west of Western Australia. It is a low-growing shrub, with heart-shaped leaves arranged in opposite pairs, white or pale pink flowers usually arranged singly in leaf axils with 10 to 20 stamens in one or two rows.

== Description ==
Hypocalymma minus is a low-growing shrub that typically grows to a height of 10–50 cm (3.9–19.7 in) high and 20–70 cm (7.9–27.6 in) wide. Its leaves are arranged in opposite pairs, heart-shaped, 4–8 mm (0.16–0.31 in) long and 3–9 mm (0.12–0.35 in) wide on a petiole 0.1–0.5 mm (0.0039–0.0197 in) long. The lower surface of the leaves is a lighter shade of green than the upper surface with tiny oil glands. The flowers are 4–6 mm (0.16–0.24 in) in diameter, mostly borne singly in leaf axils on a peduncle 4–12 mm (0.16–0.47 in) long, each flower on a pedicel up to 0.8 mm (0.031 in) long, with bracteoles 0.7–1.5 mm (0.028–0.059 in) long but that fall off as the flowers open. The floral tube is 0.6–1.2 mm (0.024–0.047 in) long and 1.0–1.5 mm (0.039–0.059 in) in diameter and the sepal lobes are broadly egg-shaped to almost round, 0.6–1.3 mm (0.024–0.051 in) long, 1.0–1.6 mm (0.039–0.063 in) wide and white, sometimes with a pink tinge. The petals are white or pale pink, 1.2–2.0 mm (0.047–0.079 in) long and there are 10 to 20 white stamens in one or two rows, the longest filaments 0.5–1 mm (0.020–0.039 in) long. Flowering mainly occurs from September to February, and the fruit is a capsule 1.3–1.5 mm (0.051–0.059 in) long and 2–3 mm (0.079–0.118 in) in diameter.

== Taxonomy ==
This species was first formally described in 2003 by Arne Strid and Gregory John Keighery in the Nordic Journal of Botany who gave it the name Hypocalymma cordifolium subsp. minus from specimens collected by Strid near Brennan's Ford east-north-east of Augusta in 1982. In 2013, Greg Keighery raised to subspecies to species status as Hypocalymma minus in the journal Nuytsia. The specific epithet (minus) means 'smaller' or 'less'.

== Distribution and habitat ==
This species of Hypocalymma grows in near coastal, winter-wet areas from near Busselton to Denmark in the Jarrah Forest and Warren bioregions of south-western Western Australia.
