= Hypocalymma longifolium =

Conservation status
- Declared rare (DEC)

Scientific classification
- Kingdom: Plantae
- Clade: Tracheophytes
- Clade: Angiosperms
- Clade: Eudicots
- Clade: Rosids
- Order: Myrtales
- Family: Myrtaceae
- Genus: Hypocalymma
- Species: H. longifolium

Binomial name
- Hypocalymma longifolium F.Muell.

Synonyms
- Hypocalymma angustifolium subsp. longifolium (F.Muell.) Strid & Keighery

Species of flowering plant

Hypocalymma longifolium, commonly known as long-leaved myrtle, is a species of flowering plant in the myrtle family Myrtaceae, and is endemic to a restricted part of Western Australia. It is an open shrub with linear leaves, and white or cream-coloured flowers arranged in pairs in leaf axils, with 40 to 50 stamens in several rows.

== Description ==
Hypocalymma longifolium' is an open shrub with many branches and that typically grows to a height of up to 1 m (3 ft 3 in). Its leaves are arranged in opposite pairs, glabrous, linear, 50–70 mm (2.0–2.8 in) long, 0.8–1.2 mm (0.031–0.047 in) wide and deeply convex on the lower surface. The flowers are mostly borne in pairs in leaf axils and are 9–12 mm (0.35–0.47 in) in diameter, sessile or on a peduncle up to 2 mm (0.079 in) long. The flowers are white or cream-coloured, sessile or on a pedicel up to 0.8 mm (0.031 in) long. The sepal lobes are broadly egg-shaped or very broadly egg-shaped, 1.3–2.0 mm (0.051–0.079 in) long and 2.0–2.5 mm (0.079–0.098 in) wide. There are 40 to 50 stamens in several rows, the longest filaments 3.5–4.0 mm (0.14–0.16 in) long. Flowering occurs in August and September and the fruit is 3.5 mm (0.14 in) long and 6.0–6.5 mm (0.24–0.26 in) wide.

== Taxonomy ==
Hypocalymma longifolium was first formally described in 1860 by Ferdinand von Mueller in his Fragmenta Phytographiae Australiae from specimens near the Murchison River, collected by Augustus Oldfield. The specific epithet (longifolium) means 'long-leaved'.

== Distribution and habitat ==
This species of Hypocalymma is found in a small area along the west coast in swamps or breakaways near the lower Murchison River, including in Kalbarri National Park, where it grows in sandy to clay soils.

== Conservation status ==
Hypocalymma longifolium is listed as "Threatened Flora (Declared Rare Flora — Extant)" by the Government of Western Australia Department of Biodiversity, Conservation and Attractions.
