= Leucopogon infuscatus =

Scientific classification
- Kingdom: Plantae
- Clade: Tracheophytes
- Clade: Angiosperms
- Clade: Eudicots
- Clade: Asterids
- Order: Ericales
- Family: Ericaceae
- Genus: Leucopogon
- Species: L. infuscatus

Binomial name
- Leucopogon infuscatus Strid
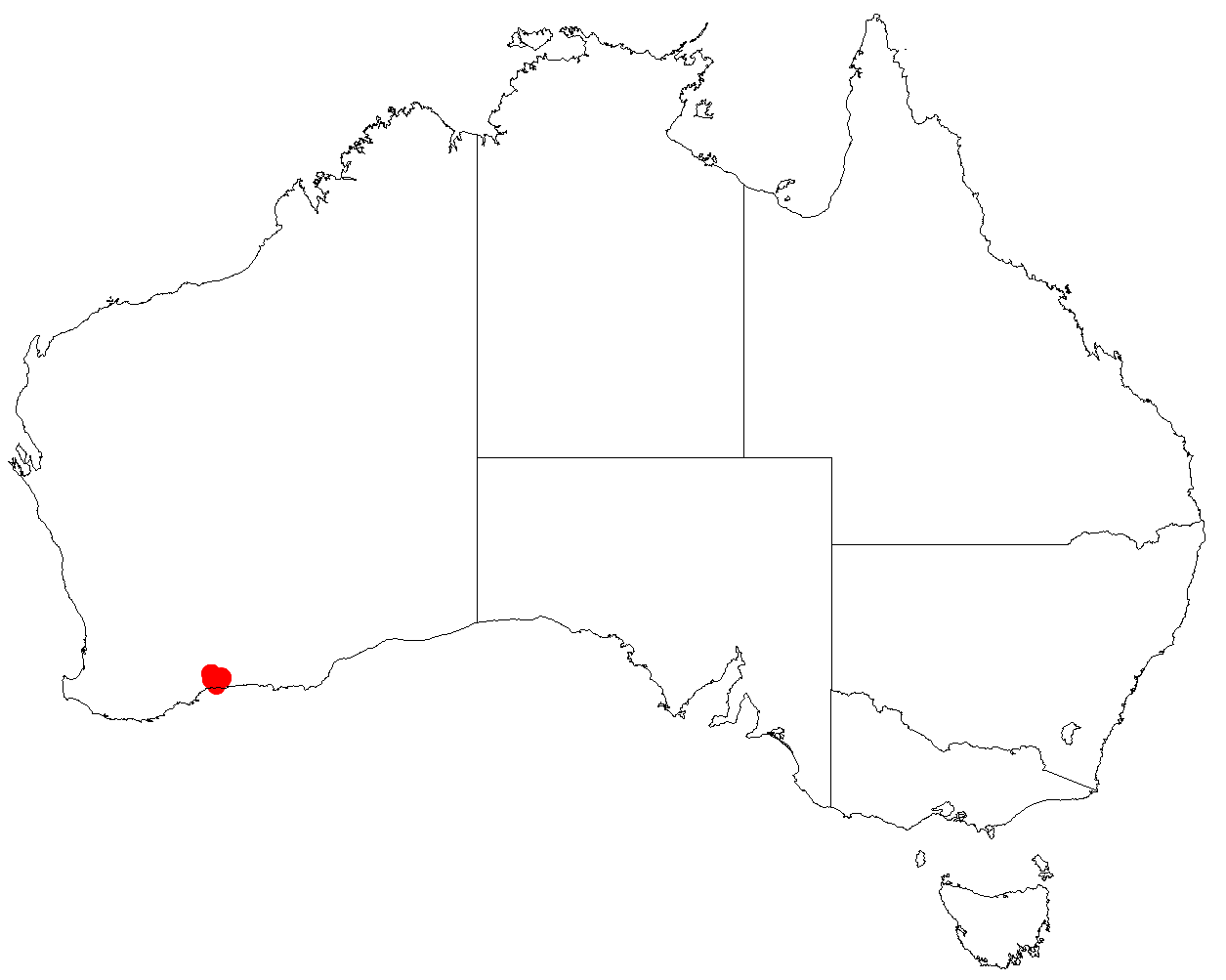
- Occurrence data from AVH

Species of plant

Leucopogon infuscatus is a species of flowering plant in the heath family Ericaceae and is endemic to the south-west of Western Australia. It is a shrublet with many branches, egg-shaped to lance-shaped leaves, and light brown, densely bearded flowers.

== Description ==
Leucopogon infuscatus is a shrublet that typically grows to a height of 20–50 cm (7.9–19.7 in) and has many spreading branches. Its leaves are egg-shaped to lance-shaped, 3.5–5.5 mm (0.14–0.22 in) long and 1.7–2.3 mm (0.067–0.091 in) wide on a petiole about 0.4 mm (0.016 in) long. The flowers are arranged in leaf axils in a spike 4–10 mm (0.16–0.39 in) long with up to 12 flowers with broad, more or less overlapping brown bracts 2.0 mm (0.079 in) long and slightly smaller bracteoles. The sepals are oblong, about 2.5 mm (0.098 in) long, the petals light brown and joined at the base to form a tube about 1.5 mm (0.059 in) long, the lobes 2.5–3.0 mm (0.098–0.118 in) long and densely bearded on the inside. Flowering mainly occurs in August and September.

== Taxonomy and naming ==
Leucopogon infuscatus was first formally described in 1986 by Arne Strid in the journal Willdenowia from specimens he collected near Ravensthorpe along the road to Esperance in 1982. The specific epithet (infuscatus) is derived from the Latin word infusco, meaning "to darken", referring to flower parts which darken and dry as they age.

== Distribution and habitat ==
This leucopogon grows on ridgetops and flats in the Esperance Plains bioregion of south-western Western Australia.

== Conservation status ==
Leucopogon infuscatus is classified as "not threatened" by the Western Australian Government Department of Biodiversity, Conservation and Attractions.
