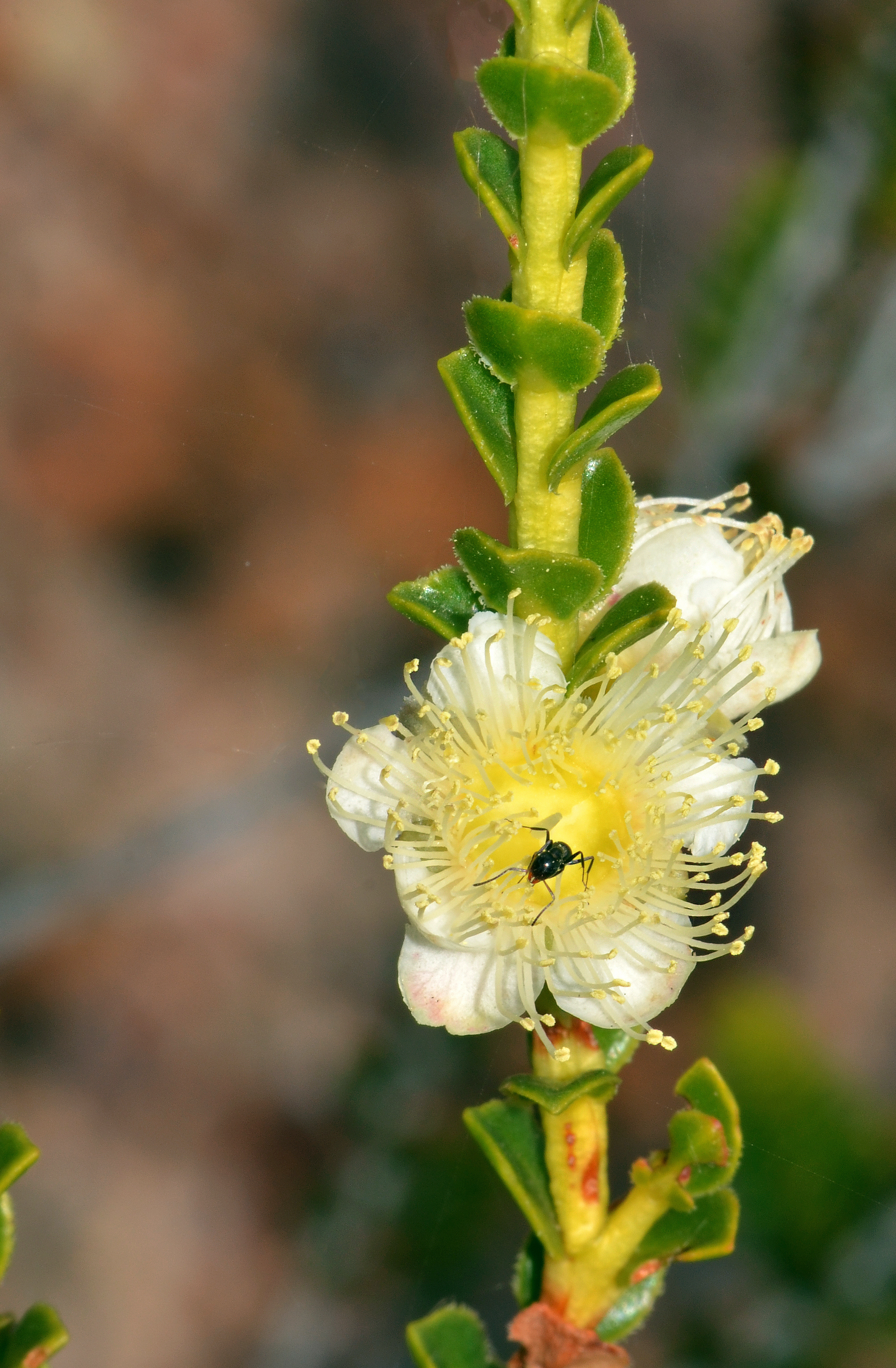

Conservation status
- Declared rare (DEC)

Scientific classification
- Kingdom: Plantae
- Clade: Tracheophytes
- Clade: Angiosperms
- Clade: Eudicots
- Clade: Rosids
- Order: Myrtales
- Family: Myrtaceae
- Genus: Hypocalymma
- Species: H. sylvestre

Binomial name
- Hypocalymma sylvestre Strid & Keighery

= Hypocalymma sylvestre =

Species of flowering plant

Hypocalymma sylvestre commonly known as Chittering myrtle, is a species of flowering in the myrtle family Myrtaceae, and is endemic to a restricted part of the south-west of Western Australia. It is a spreading shrub, with broadly egg-shaped to heart-shaped leaves, and pale yellow flowers with 100 to 200 stamens in several rows.

== Description ==
Hypocalymma sylvestre is a spreading shrub that typically grows up to 40–80 cm (16–31 in) high and 0.4–1 m (1 ft 4 in – 3 ft 3 in) wide. Its leaves are broadly egg-shaped to heart-shaped, 5–6 mm (0.20–0.24 in) long, 4–5 mm (0.16–0.20 in) wide and usually V-shaped in cross section. The leaves are hairy and dotted with many small oil glands. The flowers are 12–15 mm (0.47–0.59 in) in diameter, and often arranged in pairs with bracteoles 3.0–4.5 mm (0.12–0.18 in) long at the base. The floral tube is 1.2–1.5 mm (0.047–0.059 in) wide and the sepals are very broadly egg-shaped, 2.0–3.5 mm (0.079–0.138 in) long and 3–5 mm (0.12–0.20 in) wide. The petals are pale yellow, 4–5 mm (0.16–0.20 in) long and there are 100 to 200 pale yellow stamens, the longest filaments about 5 mm (0.20 in) long. Flowering mainly occurs from August to October, and the fruit is a capsule 3.5–4.0 mm (0.14–0.16 in) long and 5.0–5.5 mm (0.20–0.22 in) in diameter.

== Taxonomy ==
Hypocalymma sylvestre was first formally described in 2003 by Arne Strid and Greg Keighery in the Nordic Journal of Botany from specimens collected near Chittering in 1998. The specific epithet (sylvestre) means 'pertaining to woods' or 'growing wild'.

== Distribution and habitat ==
Chittering myrtle is found in woodland and on lateritic hilltops in powderbark wandoo in an area centred around Chittering in the south-west of Western Australia, where it grows in sandy-loamy soils.

== Conservation status ==
Chittering myrtle is listed as "Threatened Flora (Declared Rare Flora — Extant)" by the Government of Western Australia Department of Biodiversity, Conservation and Attractions.
