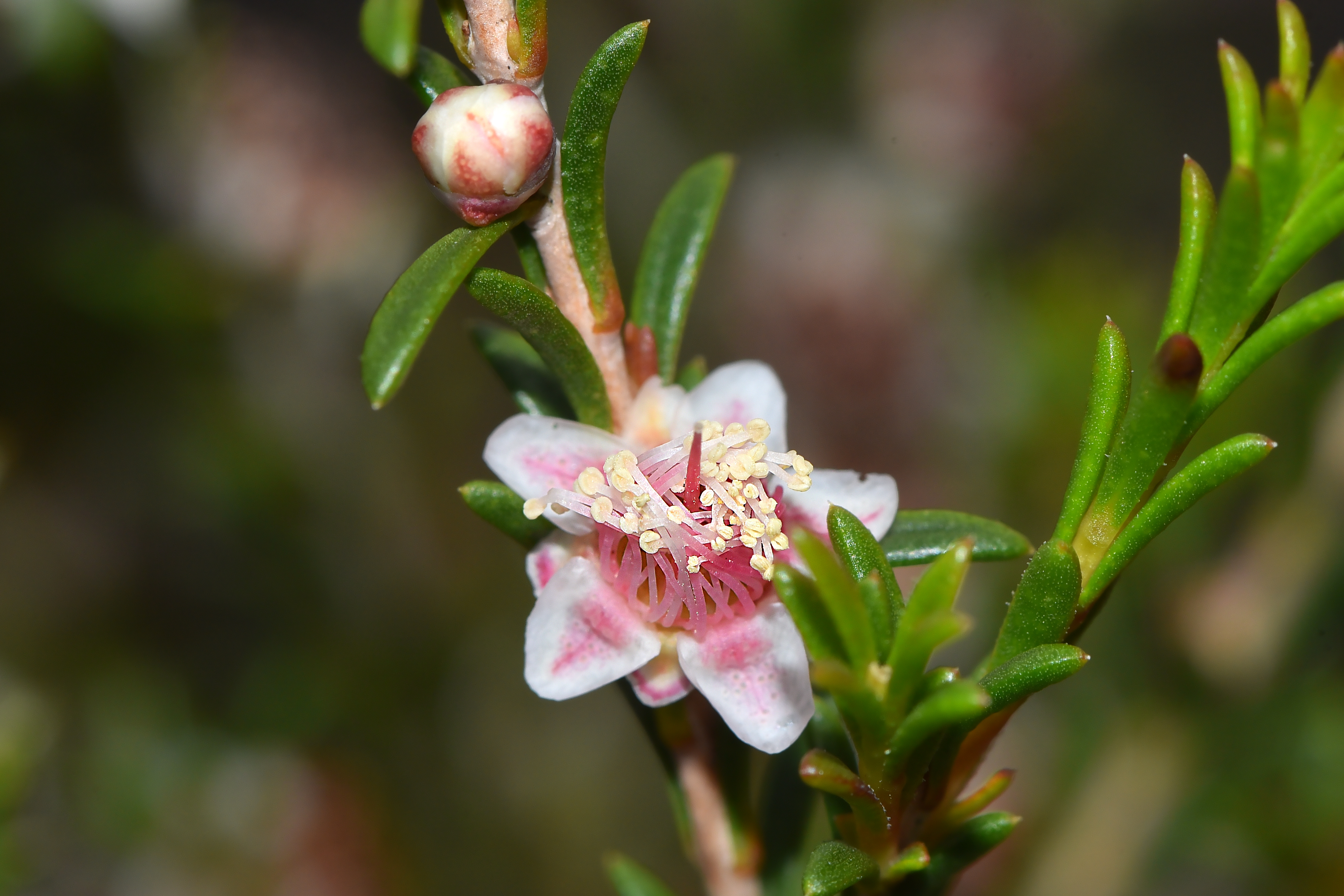
- In Badgingarra National Park

Conservation status
- Priority Two — Poorly Known Taxa (DEC)

Scientific classification
- Kingdom: Plantae
- Clade: Tracheophytes
- Clade: Angiosperms
- Clade: Eudicots
- Clade: Rosids
- Order: Myrtales
- Family: Myrtaceae
- Genus: Hypocalymma
- Species: H. serrulatum

Binomial name
- Hypocalymma serrulatum Strid & Keighery

= Hypocalymma serrulatum =

Species of flowering plant

Hypocalymma serrulatum commonly known as early myrtle, is a species of flowering in the myrtle family Myrtaceae, and is endemic to the south-west of Western Australia. It is an erect shrub, with linear leaves, and white or pink flowers with 40 to 55 stamens.

== Description ==
Hypocalymma serrulatum is an erect shrub that typically grows to a height of 0.3–1.8 m (1 ft 0 in – 5 ft 11 in). Its leaves are linear in outline, 6–15 mm (0.24–0.59 in) long, 0.8–1.3 mm (0.031–0.051 in) wide and 0.5–0.8 mm (0.020–0.031 in) thick. The upper side is grooved, the lower side deeply convex with one or two rows of oil glands and the edges of the leaves have small serrations. The flowers are 7–8 mm (0.28–0.31 in) in diameter, and often arranged in pairs with bracteoles 2–3 mm (0.079–0.118 in) long at the base. The floral tube is about 3–4 mm (0.12–0.16 in) wide and the sepals are broadly egg-shaped, 1.5–2.2 mm (0.059–0.087 in) long and 1.8–2.7 mm (0.071–0.106 in) wide. The petals are white or pink, 3.0–3.5 mm (0.12–0.14 in) long and there are 40 to 55 white stamens, the longest filaments 3.5–5.5 mm (0.14–0.22 in) long. Flowering occurs in most months with a peak from March to July, and the fruit is a capsule 3.5–4.0 mm (0.14–0.16 in) long and 4–5 mm (0.16–0.20 in) in diameter.

== Taxonomy ==
Hypocalymma serrulatum was first formally described in 2003 by Arne Strid and Greg Keighery in the Nordic Journal of Botany from specimens Keighery collected 9 km (5.6 mi) east-north-east of Badgingarra in Badgingarra National Park in 1982. The specific epithet (serrulatum) means 'like a small saw', referring to the edges of the leaves.

== Distribution and habitat ==
This species of Hypocalymma is found in low-lying areas at the base of low hills, often in Banksia woodland and with Eucalyptus todtiana, from near Hill River to the south of Badgingarra National Park in the Geraldton Sandplains and Swan Coastal Plain bioregions of south-western Western Australia.

== Conservation status ==
Hypocalymma serrulatum is listed as "Priority Two" by the Government of Western Australia Department of Biodiversity, Conservation and Attractions, meaning that it is poorly known and from one or a few locations.
