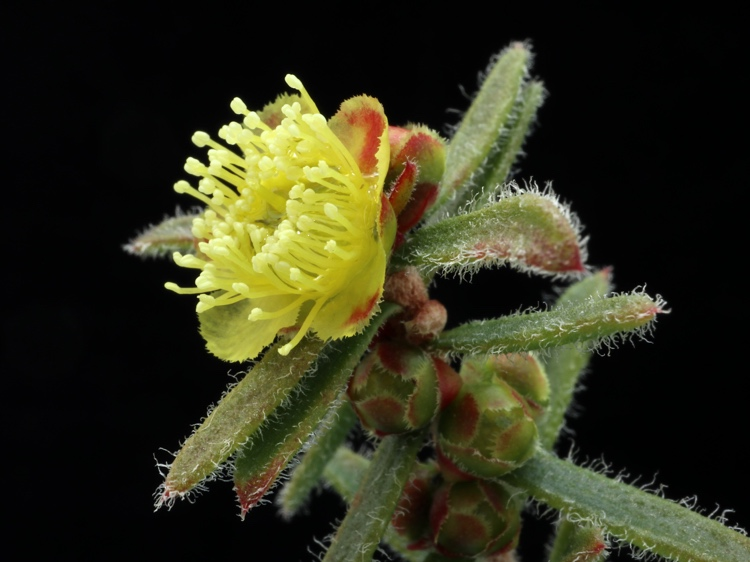
- In the ANBG

Scientific classification
- Kingdom: Plantae
- Clade: Tracheophytes
- Clade: Angiosperms
- Clade: Eudicots
- Clade: Rosids
- Order: Myrtales
- Family: Myrtaceae
- Genus: Hypocalymma
- Species: H. hirsutum

Binomial name
- Hypocalymma hirsutum Strid & Keighery

= Hypocalymma hirsutum =

Species of flowering plant

Hypocalymma hirsutum is a species of flowering plant in the myrtle family Myrtaceae, and is endemic to the south west of Western Australia. It is a low-growing shrub, with leaves arranged in opposite pairs, narrowly egg-shaped with the narrower end towards the base, and bright yellow flowers arranged singly in leaf axils, with usually 80 to 110 stamens in several rows.

== Description ==
Hypocalymma hirsutum is a low-growing shrub that typically grows to a height of up to 10–70 cm (3.9–27.6 in), 40–80 cm (16–31 in) wide and forms a lignotuber. Its leaves are arranged in opposite pairs, narrowly egg-shaped with the narrower end towards the base, 7–15 mm (0.28–0.59 in) long and 1.0–3.5 mm (0.039–0.138 in) wide on a petiole up to 0.5 mm (0.020 in) long. Both sides of the leaves are same shade of green and there are many tiny oil glands on the lower surface. The flowers are sessile and usually arranged singly in leaf axils with egg-shaped bracts and bracteoles with the narrower end towards the base, about 2.5 mm (0.098 in) long, tinged with pink and dentate. The floral tube is 1.0–1.5 mm (0.039–0.059 in) long and 3.0–4.0 mm (0.12–0.16 in) in diameter and the sepal lobes are more or less round, 1.5–2.0 mm (0.059–0.079 in) long, 2.5–3.5 mm (0.098–0.138 in) wide and lobed. The petals are bright yellow, 3.0–4.0 mm (0.12–0.16 in) long and there are usually 80 to 110 yellow stamens in several rows, the longest filaments 3.5–5.0 mm (0.14–0.20 in) long. Flowering occurs between July and October and the fruit is a capsule about 3 mm (0.12 in) long and 5.0–5.5 mm (0.20–0.22 in) in diameter.

== Taxonomy ==
Hypocalymma hirsutum was first formally described in 2003 by Arne Strid and Gregory John Keighery in the Nordic Journal of Botany from specimens collected 48 mi (77 km) from Coorow on the road to Green Head in 1974. The specific epithet (hirsutum) means 'hirsute', referring to the young stems and leaves.

== Distribution and habitat ==
This species of Hypocalymma grows in beakaways and hilltops on shrubland, heath or open woodland between Eneabba and Lesueur National Park in the Avon Wheatbelt, Geraldton Sandplains and Swan Coastal Plain bioregions of south-western Western Australia, where it grows in sandy lateritic soils.
