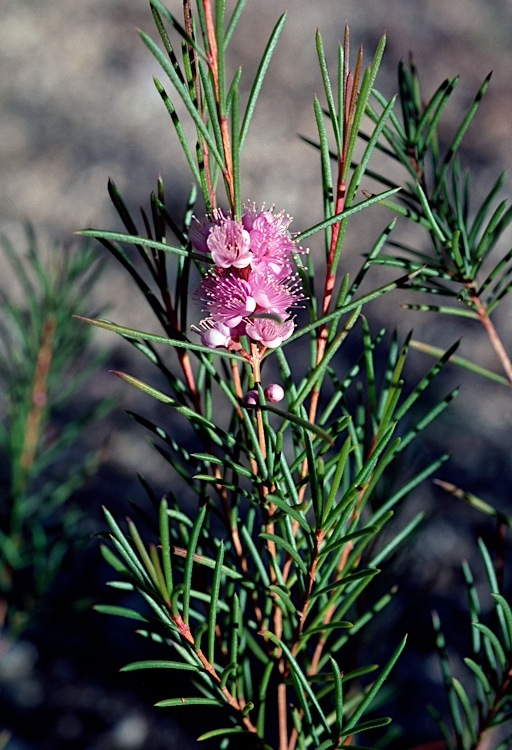
- In the Australian National Botanic Gardens

Scientific classification
- Kingdom: Plantae
- Clade: Tracheophytes
- Clade: Angiosperms
- Clade: Eudicots
- Clade: Rosids
- Order: Myrtales
- Family: Myrtaceae
- Genus: Hypocalymma
- Species: H. elongatum

Binomial name
- Hypocalymma elongatum (Strid & Keighery) Rye

= Hypocalymma elongatum =

Species of flowering plant

Hypocalymma elongatum is a species of flowering plant in the myrtle family Myrtaceae, and is endemic to the south west of Western Australia. It is a large, bushy shrub with linear leaves more or less triangular in cross section, and pink flowers arranged in pairs in leaf axils with 30 to 50 stamens.

== Description ==
Hypocalymma elongatum is a large, bushy shrub that typically grows to a height of 0.3–1.6 m (1 ft 0 in – 5 ft 3 in) and often has many branches. Its leaves are arranged in opposite pairs, linear, 15–23 mm (0.59–0.91 in) long, about 0.8 mm (0.031 in) wide, sessile, triangular in cross section and spaced 10–20 mm (0.39–0.79 in) apart. The flowers are arranged in pairs in leaf axils, more or less sessile or occasionally on peduncles up to 2 mm (0.079 in) long. The bracts and bracteoles fall off in the bud stage. The sepal lobes are broadly egg-shaped, 1.5–2.0 mm (0.059–0.079 in) long and pale pinkish. The petals are more or less round and pink, about 3 mm (0.12 in) long and there are 35 to 55 stamens, the filaments joined at the base and about the same length, or shortly longer than the petals. Flowering mainly occurs between December and April and the fruit is a capsule about 3 mm (0.12 in) long and 3.5 mm (0.14 in) wide.

== Taxonomy ==
This species was first described in 2003 by Arne Strid and Greg Keighery who gave it the name Hypocalymma strictum subsp. elongatum in the Nordic Journal of Botany from specimens collected by Strid near Wellstead. In 2020 Barbara Lynette Rye raised it to species status as Hypocalymma elongatum in the journal Nuytsia. The specific epithet (elongatum) means 'lengthened', referring to the distance between the leaves.

== Distribution and habitat ==
Hypocalymma elongatum grows in sandy soils in the area around the Stirling Range, from the Hamilla Hill Nature Reserve to Wellstead in the Avon Wheatbelt, Esperance Plains and Jarrah Forest bioregions of south-western Western Australia.
