= Leucopogon cochlearifolius =

Scientific classification
- Kingdom: Plantae
- Clade: Tracheophytes
- Clade: Angiosperms
- Clade: Eudicots
- Clade: Asterids
- Order: Ericales
- Family: Ericaceae
- Genus: Leucopogon
- Species: L. cochlearifolius

Binomial name
- Leucopogon cochlearifolius Strid
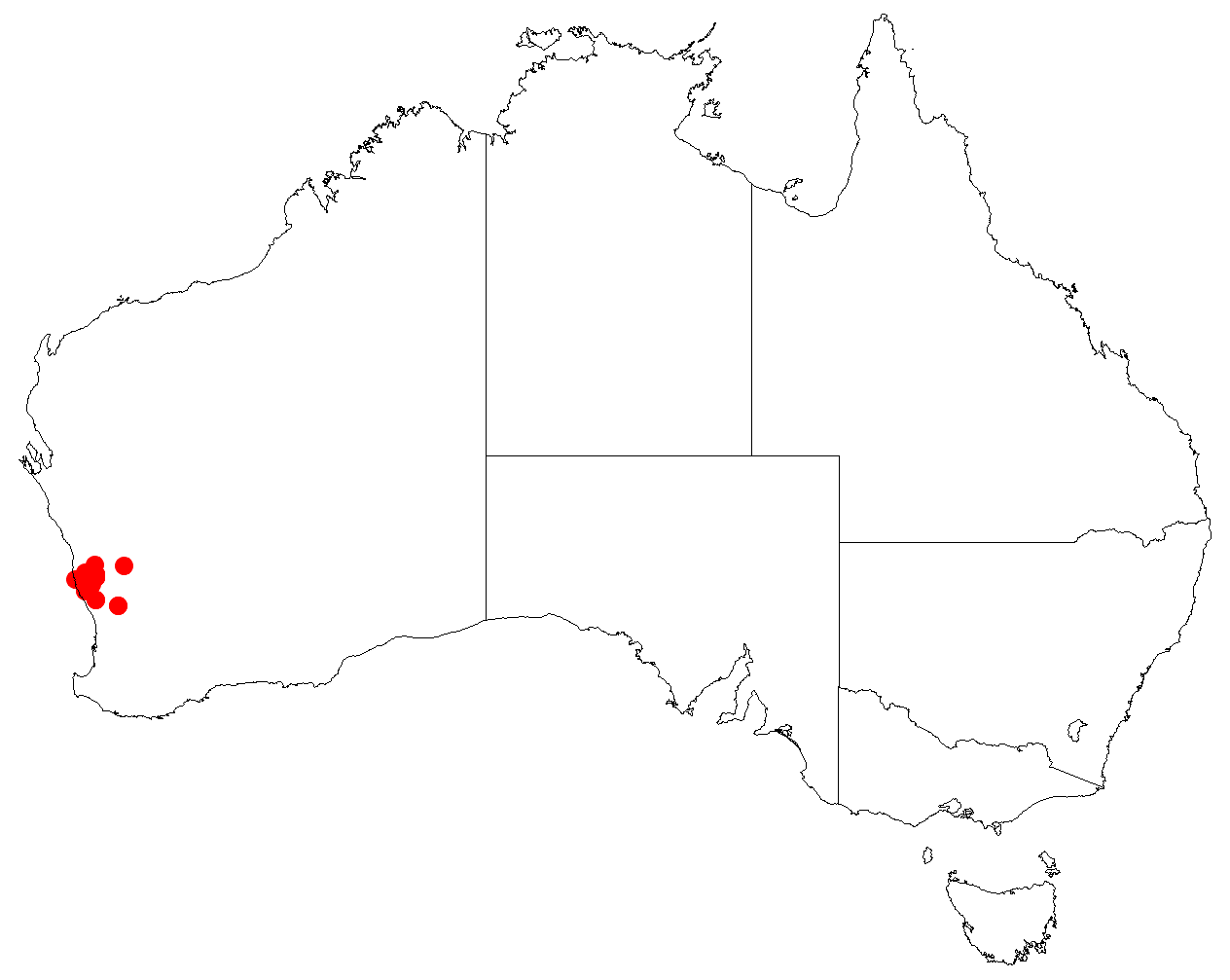
- Occurrence data from AVH

Species of plant

Leucopogon cochlearifolius is a species of flowering plant in the heath family Ericaceae and is endemic to the south-west of Western Australia. It is a bushy shrublet with many branchlets, triangular to spoon-shaped leaves, and white flowers arranged in clusters on short side-shoots.

== Description ==
Leucopogon cochlearifolius is a bushy shrublet that typically grows to a height of 30–50 cm (12–20 in). Long shoots have few triangular to spoon-shaped leaves 5–7 mm (0.20–0.28 in) long and 1.7–2.2 mm (0.067–0.087 in) wide on a petiole 0.8–1.5 mm (0.031–0.059 in) long. Leaves on short flowering shoots are crowded near the tip and are slightly smaller than those on long shoots. The flowers are arranged in groups of three to seven at the ends of short side-branches, with egg-shaped bracts and broadly egg-shaped bracteoles. The sepals are broadly lance-shaped, about 2.5 mm (0.098 in) long, the petals white or pale brown and joined at the base to form a tube about 1.6 mm (0.063 in) long, the lobes about twice as long as the petal tube and densely bearded on the inside. Flowering occurs from July to January.

== Taxonomy and naming ==
Leucopogon cochlearifolius was first formally described in 1986 by Arne Strid in the journal Willdenowia from specimens he collected north of Badgingarra in 1982. The specific epithet (cochlearifolius) means "spoon-leaved".

== Distribution and habitat ==
This leucopogon grows on sand or gravelly laterite in the Avon Wheatbelt, Geraldton Sandplains and Swan Coastal Plain bioregions of south-western Western Australia.

== Conservation status ==
Leucopogon cochlearifolius is classified as "not threatened" by the Western Australian Government Department of Biodiversity, Conservation and Attractions.
