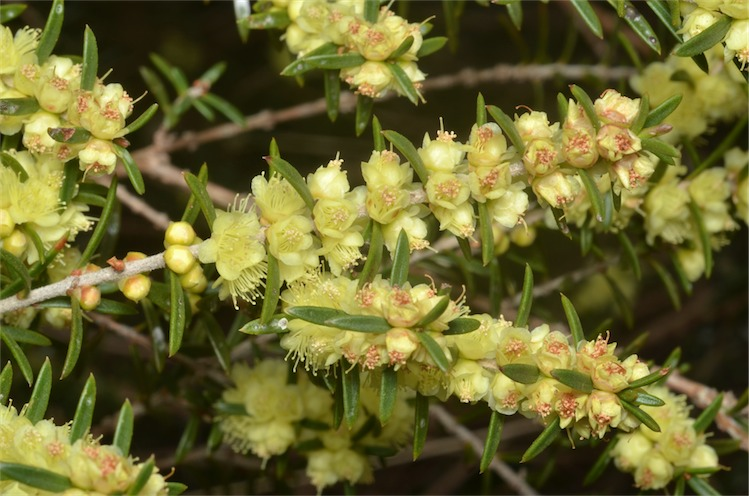
- Cultivated specimen

Conservation status
- Priority One — Poorly Known Taxa (DEC)

Scientific classification
- Kingdom: Plantae
- Clade: Tracheophytes
- Clade: Angiosperms
- Clade: Eudicots
- Clade: Rosids
- Order: Myrtales
- Family: Myrtaceae
- Genus: Hypocalymma
- Species: H. linifolium

Binomial name
- Hypocalymma linifolium Turcz.

Synonyms
- Hypocalimna linifolium Turcz. orth. var.

= Hypocalymma linifolium =

Species of flowering plant

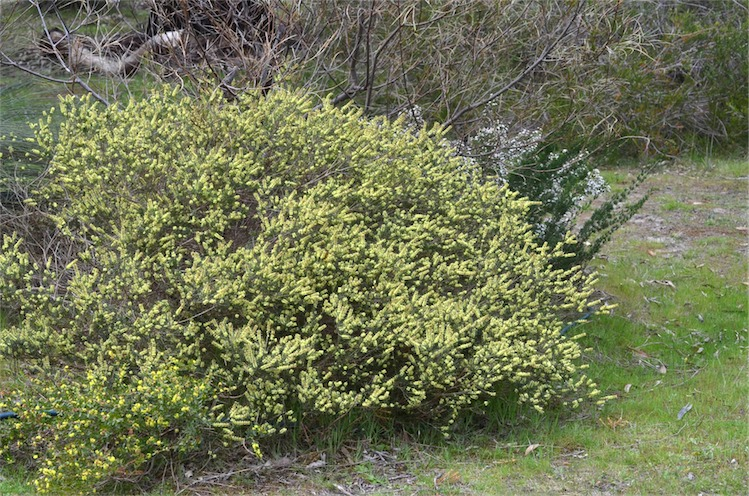
Habit in a commercial nursery in Victoria

Hypocalymma linifolium, also known as Hypocalymma x linifolium, is a species of flowering plant in the myrtle family Myrtaceae, endemic to a restricted area in the south west of Western Australia. It is a low spreading shrub that with narrowly egg-shaped to almost linear leaves and bright yellow flowers with 22 to 41 stamens in several rows.

== Description ==
Hypocalymma linifolium is a low, spreading shrub that typically grows to a height of 50–70 cm (20–28 in). Its leaves are sessile, narrowly egg-shaped to almost linear, 12–14 mm (0.47–0.55 in) long, 2–4 mm (0.079–0.157 in) wide and glabrous with grooves along the midvein and a short point on the tip. The flowers are in clusters of 3 to 5 and are more or less sessile with bracts 1–2 mm (0.039–0.079 in) long and bracteoles 1.5–2 mm (0.059–0.079 in) long. The sepals are 1.3–1.6 mm (0.051–0.063 in) long and the petals are bright yellow, 2.5–3 mm (0.098–0.118 in) long. There are 22 to 41 stamens shortly joined at the base, the longest filaments about 3 mm (0.12 in) long. Flowering occurs in August and September and the fruit is 2.5–3.0 mm (0.098–0.118 in) long. Hypocalymma linifolium is a hybrid between Hypocalymma angustifolium and H. lateriticola.

== Taxonomy ==
Hypocalymma linifolium was first formally described in 1862 by Nikolai Turczaninow in the Bulletin de la Société Impériale des Naturalistes de Moscou. The specific epithet (linifolium) means 'thread-leaved'.

== Distribution and habitat ==
This species of Hypocalymma grows in sand between Badgingarra and Dandaragan in the Geraldton Sandplains and Swan Coastal Plain bioregions of south-western Western Australia.

== Conservation status ==
Hypocalymma linifolium is listed as "Priority One" by the Government of Western Australia Department of Biodiversity, Conservation and Attractions, meaning that it is known from only one or a few locations where it is potentially at risk.
