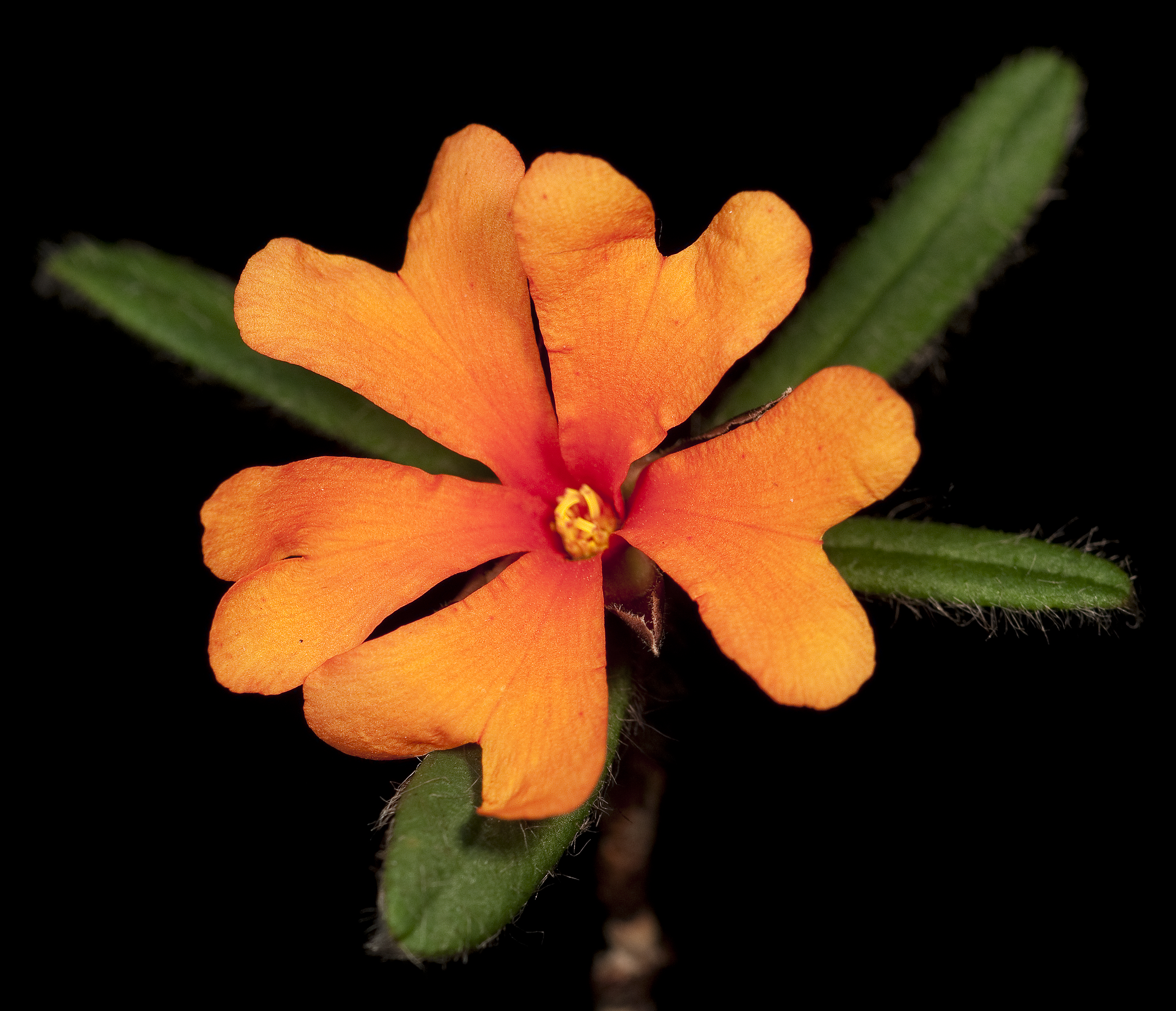

Conservation status
- Priority Two — Poorly Known Taxa (DEC)

Scientific classification
- Kingdom: Plantae
- Clade: Tracheophytes
- Clade: Angiosperms
- Clade: Eudicots
- Order: Dilleniales
- Family: Dilleniaceae
- Genus: Hibbertia
- Species: H. selkii

Binomial name
- Hibbertia selkii Keighery

= Hibbertia selkii =

Species of plant

Hibbertia selkii is a shrub in the Dilleniaceae family, native to Western Australia. The plant was first described by Gregory John Keighery in 1983. The holotype (PERTH 3095258) was collected by A. S. George in the Stirling Range National Park in 1976.

== Description ==
Hibbertia selkii is a small shrub with many branches. It grows up to 0.3m tall and is found on rocky slopes. Its orange flowers appear from May to June.

== See also ==
- List of Hibbertia species
