= H. puniceum =

H. puniceum may refer to:

- Haematomma puniceum, a species of lichen
- Hippeastrum puniceum, a species of lily
- Hypocalymma puniceum, a species of myrtle
