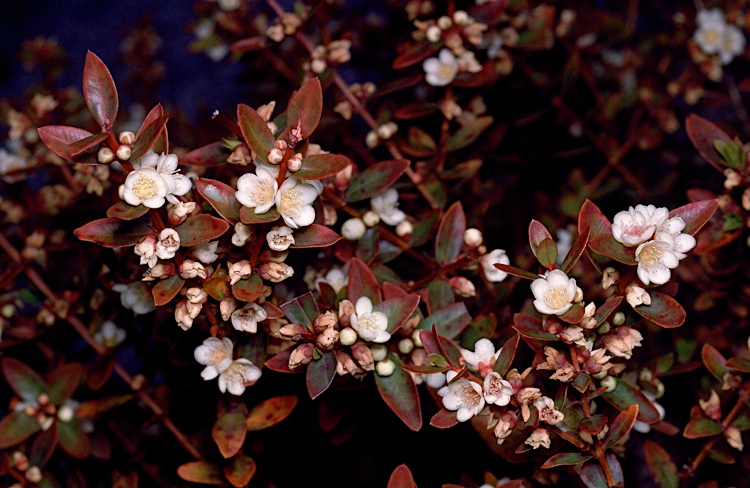
- Cultivated specimen in Maranoa Gardens

Conservation status
- Priority Two — Poorly Known Taxa (DEC)

Scientific classification
- Kingdom: Plantae
- Clade: Tracheophytes
- Clade: Angiosperms
- Clade: Eudicots
- Clade: Rosids
- Order: Myrtales
- Family: Myrtaceae
- Genus: Hypocalymma
- Species: H. myrtifolium

Binomial name
- Hypocalymma myrtifolium Turcz.

= Hypocalymma myrtifolium =

Species of flowering plant

Hypocalymma myrtifolium is a species of flowering plant in the myrtle family Myrtaceae, and is endemic to a restricted area in the south west of Western Australia. It is an erect shrub with egg-shaped to elliptic leaves and white or cream-coloured flowers with 30 to 50 stamens in several rows.

== Description ==
Hypocalymma myrtifolium is an erect, often multistemmed shrub that typically grows to a height of 30–50 cm (12–20 in) and has winged stems. Its leaves are sessile, elliptic to egg-shaped with the narrower end towards the base, 15–40 mm (0.59–1.57 in) long and 6–16 mm (0.24–0.63 in) wide with fine serrations on the edges. The flowers are 13–15 mm (0.51–0.59 in) wide and arranged in pairs in up to ten leaf axils and are more or less sessile. The sepals are broadly egg-shaped to elliptic, 2.0–3.5 mm (0.079–0.138 in) long and the petals are white or cream-coloured, 4.5–6.4 mm (0.18–0.25 in) long. There are 30 to 50 stamens in two rows, joined for a short distance at the base, the longest filaments 3.5–4.5 mm (0.14–0.18 in) long. Flowering occurs from July to November and the fruit is about 3 mm (0.12 in) long.

== Taxonomy ==
Hypocalymma myrticolium was first formally described in 1852 by Nikolai Turczaninow in the Bulletin de la Classe Physico-Mathématique de l'Académie Impériale des Sciences de Saint-Pétersbourg from specimens collected by James Drummond. The specific epithet (myrtifolium) means 'myrtle-leaved'.

== Distribution and habitat ==
This species of Hypocalymma grows amongst rocks on the middle and upper slopes of the Bluff Knoll plateau in the Stirling Range in the south-west of Western Australia.

== Conservation status ==
Hypocalymma myrtifolium is listed as "Priority Two" by the Government of Western Australia Department of Biodiversity, Conservation and Attractions, meaning that it is poorly known and from one or a few locations.
