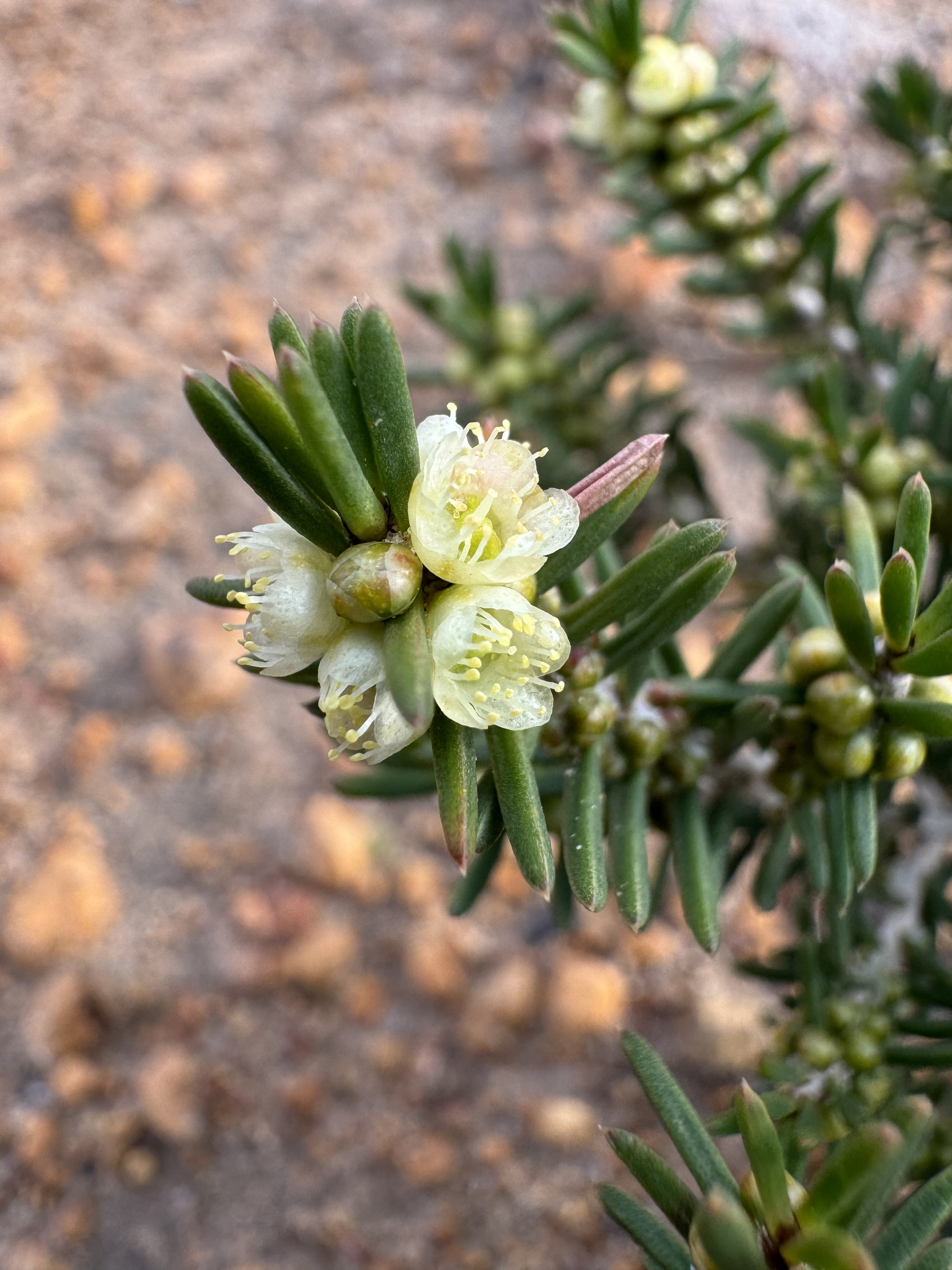
- In Mount Lindesay National Park

Scientific classification
- Kingdom: Plantae
- Clade: Tracheophytes
- Clade: Angiosperms
- Clade: Eudicots
- Clade: Rosids
- Order: Myrtales
- Family: Myrtaceae
- Genus: Hypocalymma
- Species: H. scariosum

Binomial name
- Hypocalymma scariosum Schauer

Synonyms
- Hypocalymma angustifolium var. densiflorum Benth.

= Hypocalymma scariosum =

Species of flowering plant

Hypocalymma scariosum is a species of flowering in the myrtle family Myrtaceae, and is endemic to the south of Western Australia. It is an erect, apparently short-lived, glabrous shrublet, with grooved linear leaves, and cream-coloured or sometimes yellow flowers with 12 to 20 stamens.

== Description ==
Hypocalymma scariosum is an erect, apparently short-lived shrublet that typically grows to a height of 15–40 cm (5.9–15.7 in). Its leaves are arranged in opposite pairs, linear in outline, 7–20 mm (0.28–0.79 in) long and about 0.4–0.8 mm (0.016–0.031 in) wide. The upper surface of the leaves is deeply grooved and the lower surface and deeply convex with many oil glands. The flowers are 4.5–6 mm (0.18–0.24 in) in diameter, and usually arranged in pairs with bracteoles 1.5–2 mm (0.059–0.079 in) long at the base. The sepals are egg-shaped, 1.2–1.5 mm (0.047–0.059 in) long and 2.0–2.7 mm (0.079–0.106 in) wide and the petals are cream-coloured, sometimes yellow, 1.5–2.3 mm (0.059–0.091 in) long. There are 12 to 20 white or pale yellow stamens, the longest filaments 1.7–2.5 mm (0.067–0.098 in). Flowering occurs from August to October and the fruit is a capsule 2.0–2.5 mm (0.079–0.098 in) long and 2.5–3 mm (0.098–0.118 in) wide.

== Taxonomy ==
Hypocalymma scariosum was first formally described in 1844 by Johannes Conrad Schauer in Lehmann's Plantae Preissianae. The specific epithet (scariosum) means 'thin', 'dry' or 'membraneous', referring to the bracts and bracteoles.

== Distribution and habitat ==
This species of Hypocalymma is found in swamps, often in jarrah woodland or Myrtaceae-rich shrubland from the Scott River plain to Lake Jasper and between Walpole and the Two Peoples Bay Nature Reserve in the Jarrah Forest and Warren bioregions of southern Western Australia.
