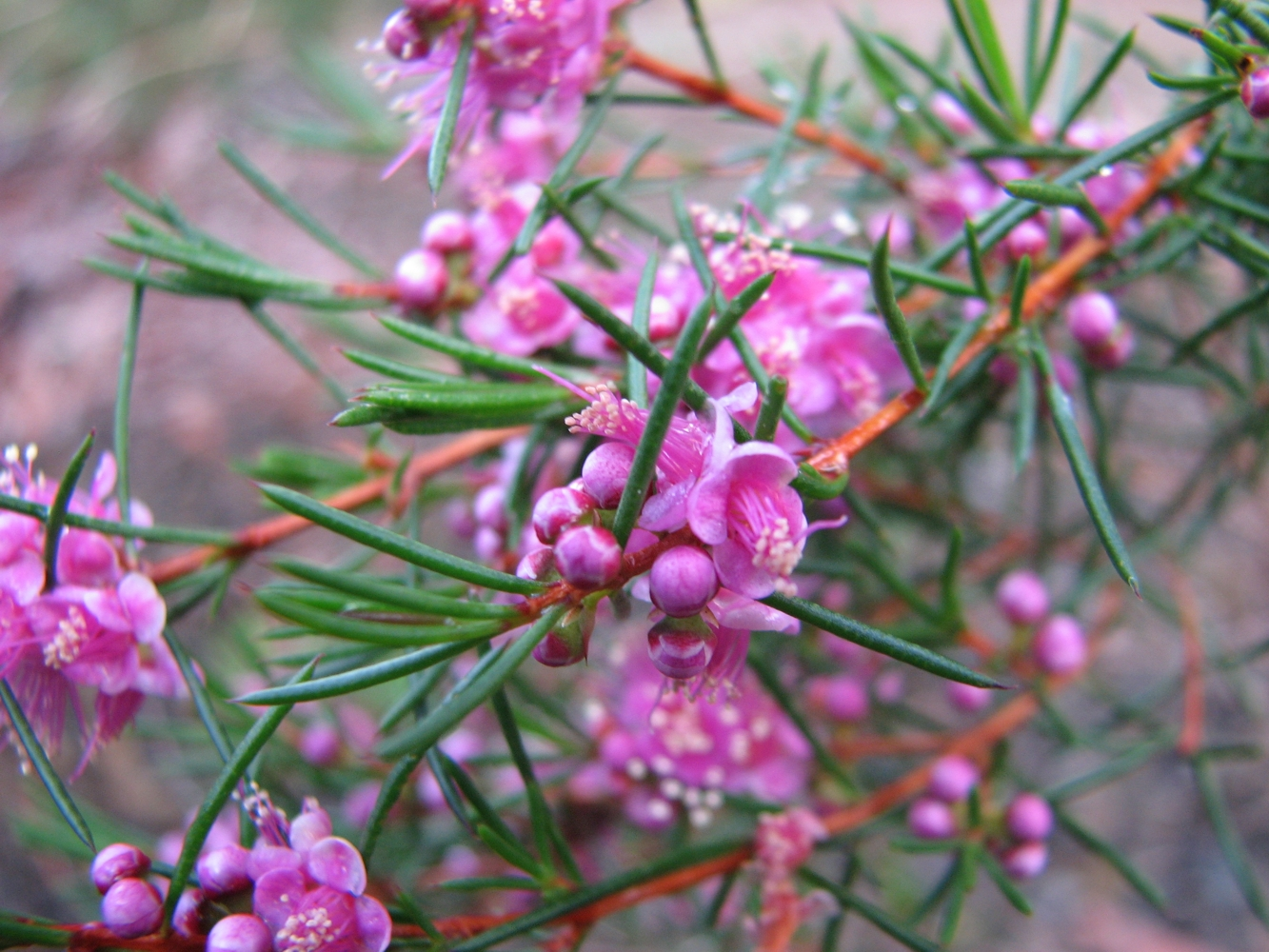

Scientific classification
- Kingdom: Plantae
- Clade: Tracheophytes
- Clade: Angiosperms
- Clade: Eudicots
- Clade: Rosids
- Order: Myrtales
- Family: Myrtaceae
- Genus: Hypocalymma
- Species: H. strictum

Binomial name
- Hypocalymma strictum Schauer

Synonyms
- Baeckia speciosa A.Cunn. nom. inval., nom. nud.; Hypocalymma cunninghami Schauer nom. inval., nom. nud.; Hypocalymma cunninghami Schauer orth. var.; Hypocalymma cunninghamii Schauer; Hypocalymma strictum Schauer nom. inval.; Hypocalymma strictum Schauer subsp. strictum; Hypocalymma strictum var. pedunculatum Benth.; Hypocalymma strictum Schauer var. strictum

= Hypocalymma strictum =

Species of flowering plant

Hypocalymma strictum is a species of flowering plant in the myrtle family Myrtaceae, and is endemic to the south west of Western Australia. It is an erect shrub with linear leaves, triangular in cross section, and deep pink flowers with 30 to 50 stamens.

== Description ==
Hypocalymma strictum is an erect shrub that typically grows to a height of 0.2–1.5 m (7.9 in – 4 ft 11.1 in) and often has many branches. Its young stems are obscurely 4-angled, brown and more or less glabrous. The leaves are linear, 6–11 mm (0.24–0.43 in) long and about 0.8 mm (0.031 in) wide and triangular in cross section, with a few pointed glands. The flowers are arranged in pairs in leaf axils and are more or less sessile or sometimes on a peduncle up to 2 mm (0.079 in) long. There are bracts and bracteoles at the base of the flowers but fall off as the flowers open. The sepal lobes are broadly elliptic, 1.5–2.0 mm (0.059–0.079 in) long and pale pinkish. The petals are pink, more or less round, about 3 mm (0.12 in) in diameter, and there are 30 to 50 pink stamens, the filaments sometimes longer than the petals. Flowering occurs from December to April.

== Taxonomy ==
Hypocalymma strictum was first formally described in 1844 by botanist Johannes Conrad Schauer in Lehmann's Plantae Preissianae. The specific epithet (strictum) means 'very upright' or 'very straight'.

== Distribution and habitat ==
This species of Hypocalymma grows in coastal heath, often in damp places, between Augusta and Ravensthorpe in the Esperance Plains, Jarrah Forest and Warren bioregions of south-western Western Australia.
