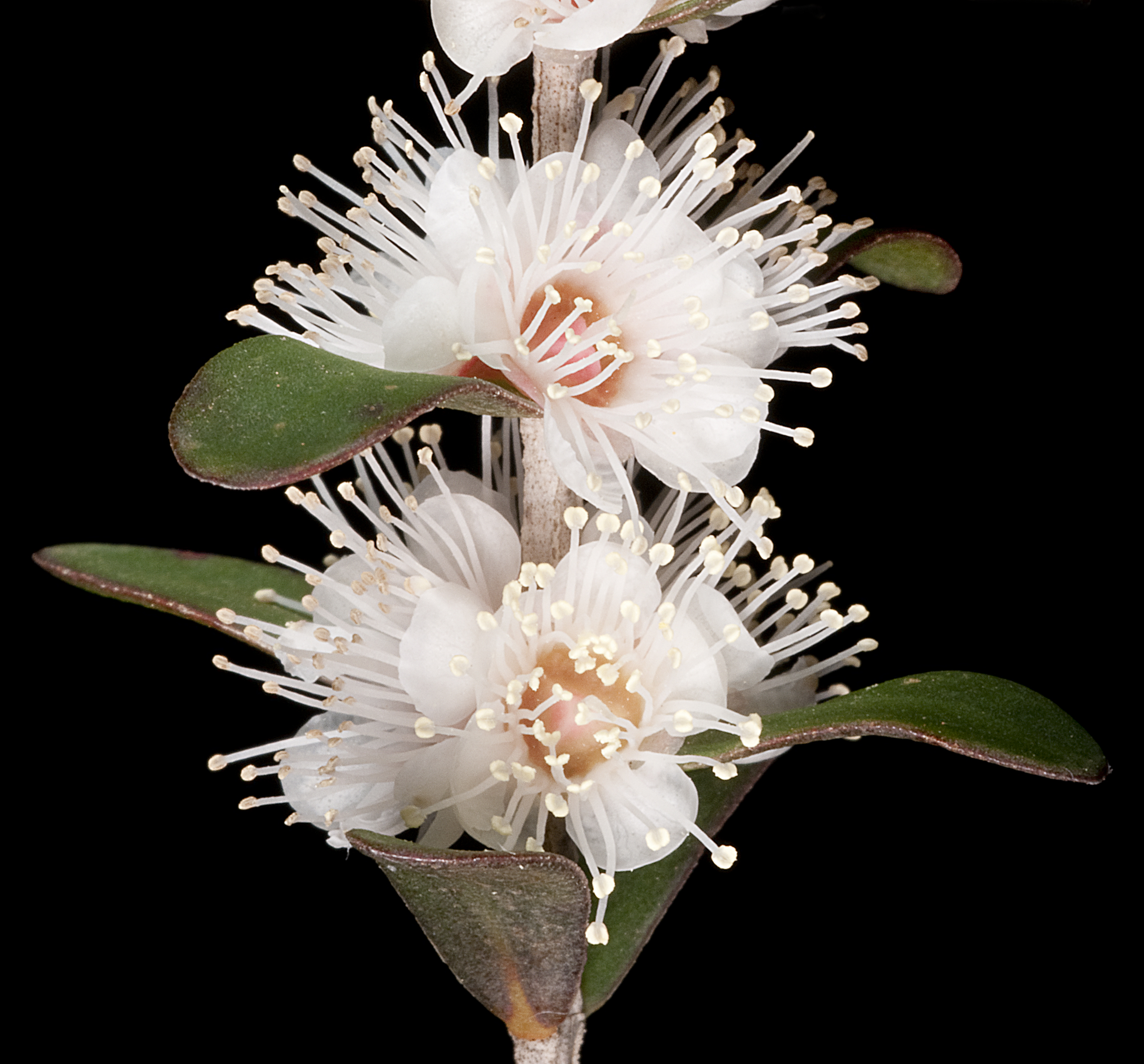

Conservation status
- Priority Three — Poorly Known Taxa (DEC)

Scientific classification
- Kingdom: Plantae
- Clade: Tracheophytes
- Clade: Angiosperms
- Clade: Eudicots
- Clade: Rosids
- Order: Myrtales
- Family: Myrtaceae
- Genus: Hypocalymma
- Species: H. tetrapterum

Binomial name
- Hypocalymma tetrapterum Turcz.

= Hypocalymma tetrapterum =

Species of flowering plant

Hypocalymma tetrapterum, commonly known as papillose myrtle, is a species of flowering plant in the myrtle family Myrtaceae, and is endemic to the a restricted area in the south-west of Western Australia. It is a shrub, with narrowly egg-shaped leaves with the narrower end towards the base, and white yellow flowers with 20 to 35 stamens in several rows.

== Description ==
Hypocalymma tetrapterum is a spreading to erect shrub that typically grows to a height of 0.4–1.5 m (1 ft 4 in – 4 ft 11 in). Its leaves are narrowly egg-shaped with the narrower end towards the base or narrowly oblong, 9–20 mm (0.35–0.79 in) long, 2–7 mm (0.079–0.276 in) wide and sessile or on a petiole up to 0.5 mm (0.020 in) long. The lower side of the leaves is convex with many oil glands, surrounded by a circle of small blisters. The flowers are 7–9 mm (0.28–0.35 in) in diameter, and often arranged in pairs with bracteoles 1.5–2.0 mm (0.059–0.079 in) long at the base. The floral tube is 1.1–1.3 mm (0.043–0.051 in) long and 3 mm (0.12 in) wide, and the sepals are egg-shaped, 1.2–1.7 mm (0.047–0.067 in) long and 2–3 mm (0.079–0.118 in) wide. The petals are white, 3–4 mm (0.12–0.16 in) long and there are 20 to 35 white stamens, the longest filaments 3–4 mm (0.12–0.16 in) long. Flowering occurs from June to October, and the fruit is a capsule 2.5–3.5 mm (0.098–0.138 in) long and 2.5–3.0 mm (0.098–0.118 in) in diameter.

== Taxonomy ==
Hypocalymma tetrapterum was first formally described in 1862 by Nikolai Turczaninow in the Bulletin de la Société impériale des naturalistes de Moscou. The specific epithet (tetrapterum) means 'four-winged'.

== Distribution and habitat ==
This species of Hypocalymma grows in sand or heavier soils, often in woodland, mainly between Eneabba and Badgingarra in the Geraldton Sandplains and Swan Coastal Plain bioregions of south-western Western Australia.
