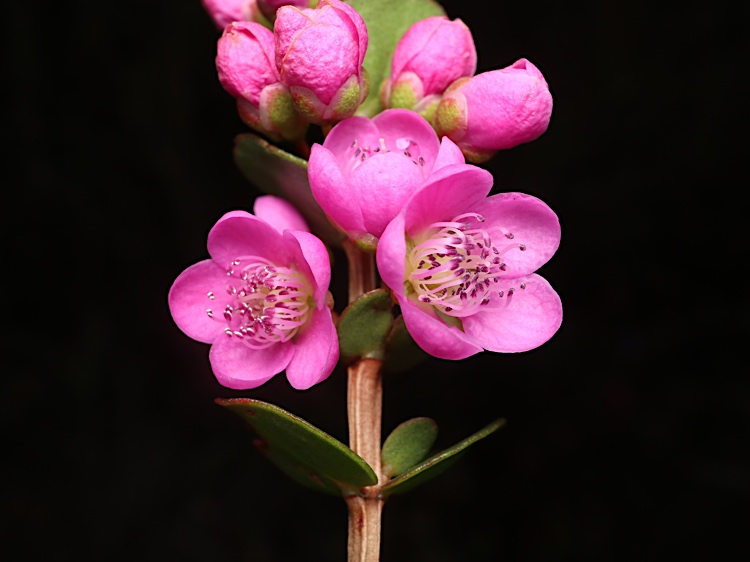

Scientific classification
- Kingdom: Plantae
- Clade: Tracheophytes
- Clade: Angiosperms
- Clade: Eudicots
- Clade: Rosids
- Order: Myrtales
- Family: Myrtaceae
- Genus: Hypocalymma
- Species: H. speciosum

Binomial name
- Hypocalymma speciosum Turcz.

= Hypocalymma speciosum =

Species of flowering plant

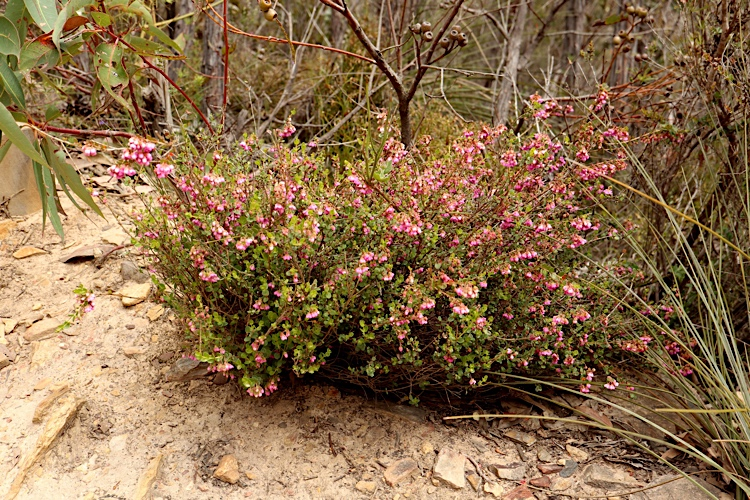
Habit on Bluff Knoll

Hypocalymma speciosum is a species of flowering plant in the myrtle family Myrtaceae, and is endemic to the Stirling Range in southern Western Australia. It is a bushy shrub with heart-shaped, egg-shaped or circular leaves and deep pink-purple flowers with 25 to 50 stamens in several rows.

== Description ==
Hypocalymma speciosum is a bushy shrub that typically grows to a height of 25–70 cm (9.8–27.6 in) and often has many stems. Its young stems are 4-angled and glabrous. The leaves are more or less sessile, heart-shaped, egg-shaped or circular, 4–18 mm (0.16–0.71 in) long and 7–15 mm (0.28–0.59 in) wide. The flowers are mostly 10–12 mm (0.39–0.47 in) wide, arranged singly or in groups of up to four, and are more or less sessile. The sepals are broadly elliptic, 2.0–3.8 mm (0.079–0.150 in) long and white with a red tinge. The petals are deep pink-purple, 6–7 mm (0.24–0.28 in) long, and there are 25 to 50 stamens in two rows forming a ring, the longest filaments 3.5–4.5 mm (0.14–0.18 in) long. Flowering occurs from September to December and the fruit is about 3 mm (0.12 in) long.

== Taxonomy ==
Hypocalymma speciosum was first formally described in 1852 by Nikolai Turczaninow in Bulletin de la Classe Physico-Mathématique de l'Académie Impériale des Sciences de Saint-Pétersbourg from specimens collected by James Drummond. The specific epithet (speciosum) means 'showy'.

== Distribution and habitat ==
This species of Hypocalymma grows on rocky slopes in the central and western parts of the Stirling Range, in the Esperance Plains bioregion of southern Western Australia.
