= Hypocalymma ericifolium =

Scientific classification
- Kingdom: Plantae
- Clade: Tracheophytes
- Clade: Angiosperms
- Clade: Eudicots
- Clade: Rosids
- Order: Myrtales
- Family: Myrtaceae
- Genus: Hypocalymma
- Species: H. ericifolium

Binomial name
- Hypocalymma ericifolium Benth.

Species of flowering plant

Hypocalymma ericifolium is a species of flowering plant in the myrtle family Myrtaceae, and is endemic to the south west of Western Australia. It is an erect shrublet with linear leaves that are more or less triangular in cross section, and bright yellow flowers arranged in pairs in leaf axils with 30 to 50 stamens.

== Description ==
Hypocalymma ericifolium is an erect shrublet with many branches and that typically grows to a height of 0.25–1 m (9.8 in – 3 ft 3.4 in). Its leaves are linear, more or less triangular in cross section, 6–11 mm (0.24–0.43 in) long, about 1 mm (0.039 in) wide and channelled on the upper surface. The flowering portion of the stem is 20–50 mm (0.79–1.97 in) long with sessile flowers arranged singly or in pairs in leaf axils. The bracts and bracteoles are boat-shaped and about 2 mm (0.079 in) long. The sepal lobes are rounded, about 1.5 mm (0.059 in) long and 2 mm (0.079 in) wide and the petals are egg-shaped to more or less roud, bright yellow and 3–4 mm (0.12–0.16 in) long. There are 30 to 50 stamens joined at the base, yellowish and slightly shorter than the petals. Flowering occurs between August and November.

== Taxonomy ==
Hypocalymma ericifolium was first formally described in 1867 by George Bentham in his Flora Australiensis from specimens collected by Augustus Oldfield. The specific epithet (ericifolium) means 'Erica-leaved'.

== Distribution and habitat ==
This species of Hypocalymma is found along the coast in flat, seasonally wet areas in the Jarrah Forest, Swan Coastal Plain and Warren bioregions of south-western Western Australia, where it grows in sandy soils.
