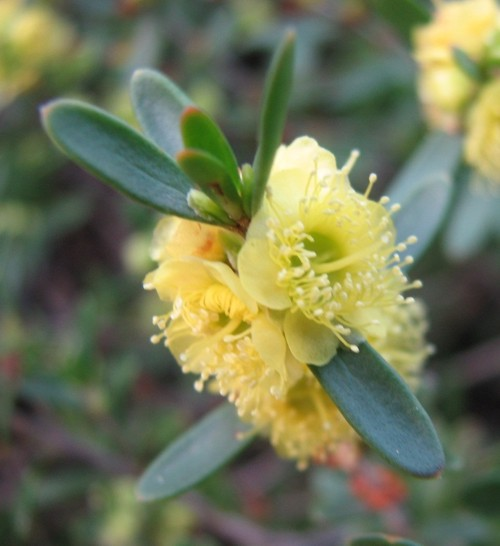
- In Maranoa Gardens

Scientific classification
- Kingdom: Plantae
- Clade: Tracheophytes
- Clade: Angiosperms
- Clade: Eudicots
- Clade: Rosids
- Order: Myrtales
- Family: Myrtaceae
- Genus: Hypocalymma
- Species: H. xanthopetalum

Binomial name
- Hypocalymma xanthopetalum F.Muell.

Synonyms
- Hypocalimna ciliatum Turcz. orth. var.; Hypocalimna cuneatum Turcz. orth. var.; Hypocalymma ciliatum Turcz.; Hypocalymma cuneatum Turcz.

= Hypocalymma xanthopetalum =

Species of flowering plant

Hypocalymma xanthopetalum, commonly known as yellow myrtle, is a species of flowering plant in the myrtle family Myrtaceae, and is endemic to the south-west of Western Australia. It is a low-growing to erect or sprawling shrub with sessile, oblong leaves, and pale to bright yellow flowers with 80 to 135 stamens.

== Description ==
Hypocalymma xanthopetalum is a low-growing to erect or sprawling shrub that typically grows to 0.15–1 m (5.9 in – 3 ft 3.4 in) high and 0.15–1.2 m (5.9 in – 3 ft 11.2 in) wide with densely hairy young stems that are round in cross section. Its leaves are sessile, usually more or less oblong, 12–25 mm (0.47–0.98 in) long, 2–9 mm (0.079–0.354 in) wide. The edges of the leaves are curved down, and the lower side of the leaves has many oil glands. The flowers are arranged in pairs in up to sixteen leaf axils on a short peduncle with bracteoles 2–3 mm (0.079–0.118 in) long. Each flower is sessile, 8–10 mm (0.31–0.39 in) in diameter, the floral tube 1.5–2 mm (0.059–0.079 in) long and 4–5 mm (0.16–0.20 in) wide. The sepals are egg-shaped, 1.5–2.0 mm (0.059–0.079 in) long and 2.3–2.8 mm (0.091–0.110 in) wide. The petals are pale to bright yellow, 3–4 mm (0.12–0.16 in) long and there are 80 to 135 stamens, the same colour as the petals, the longest filaments 3–4 mm (0.12–0.16 in) long. Flowering mainly occurs from July to September and the fruit is a capsule 2.5–3.5 mm (0.098–0.138 in) long and 3.5–4.0 mm (0.14–0.16 in) in diameter.

== Taxonomy ==
Hypocalymma xanthopetalum was first formally described in 1860 by Ferdinand von Mueller in his Fragmenta phytographiae Australiae from specimens collected by Augustus Oldfield. The specific epithet (xanthopetalum) means 'yellow-petalled'.

== Distribution and habitat ==
Yellow myrtle grows in sandplains in heath, shrubland or woodland between Geraldton and north of Muchea in the Avon Wheatbelt, Geraldton Sandplains and Swan Coastal Plain bioregions of south-western Western Australia.

== Use in horticulture ==
This species can be maintained as a well-rounded bush in cultivation and is suitable for growing in a container. It requires excellent drainage and prefers a position in full sun or partial shade. It has a degree of frost-resistance.
