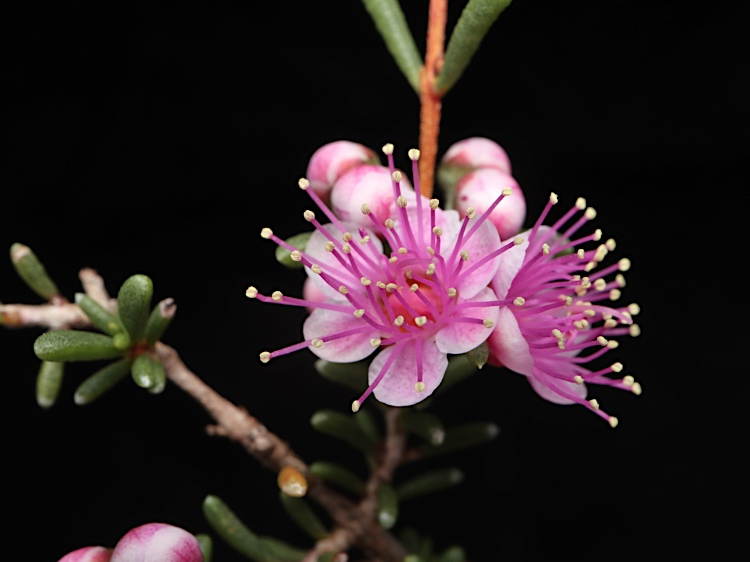
- In the Australian National Botanic Gardens

Scientific classification
- Kingdom: Plantae
- Clade: Tracheophytes
- Clade: Angiosperms
- Clade: Eudicots
- Clade: Rosids
- Order: Myrtales
- Family: Myrtaceae
- Genus: Hypocalymma
- Species: H. asperum

Binomial name
- Hypocalymma asperum Schauer

Synonyms
- Hypocalymma asperum Schauer nom. inval., nom. nud.

= Hypocalymma asperum =

Species of flowering plant

Hypocalymma asperum is a species of flowering in the myrtle family Myrtaceae, and is endemic to the south west region of Western Australia. It is an erect, multi-branched or spreading shrublet, with relatively short, stout leaves, and rose pink flowers.

== Description ==
Hypocalymma asperum is a multi-branched or spreading shrublet that typically grows to a height of up to 30–90 cm (12–35 in). Its leaves are relatively short and stout, lance-shaped with the narrower end towards the base, 3–7 mm (0.12–0.28 in) long and about 1 mm (0.039 in) wide. The flowers are arranged singly and are sessile with small bracts and bracteoles that fall off as the flowers open. The sepals are more or less round to kidney-shaped, about 1 mm (0.039 in) long and 1.5 mm (0.059 in) wide and pale pinkish. The petals are about 3 mm (0.12 in) in diameter and rose pink. There are about 30 pink stamens with the filaments joined at the base, and slightly longer than the petals. Flowering occurs from February to March and the fruit is a purplish capsule 3.5–4 mm (0.14–0.16 in) in diameter.

== Taxonomy ==
Hypocalymma asperum was first formally described in 1844 by Johannes Conrad Schauer in Lehmann's Plantae Preissianae. The specific epithet (asperum) means 'rough to the touch'.

== Distribution and habitat ==
This species of Hypocalymma is found along the south coast from the Stirling Range National Park, inland to Lake Grace and east to the Cape Arid National Park in the Avon Wheatbelt, Esperance Plains, Jarrah Forest and Mallee bioregions of southern Western Australia.
