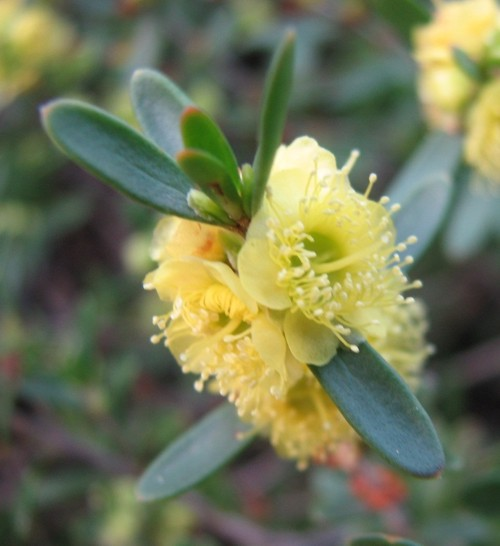
- Hypocalymma xanthopetalum

Scientific classification
- Kingdom: Plantae
- Clade: Embryophytes
- Clade: Tracheophytes
- Clade: Angiosperms
- Clade: Eudicots
- Clade: Rosids
- Order: Myrtales
- Family: Myrtaceae
- Subfamily: Myrtoideae
- Tribe: Chamelaucieae
- Genus: Hypocalymma (Endl.) Endl.

= Hypocalymma =

Genus of flowering plants

Hypocalymma is a genus of evergreen shrubs in the myrtle family Myrtaceae described as a genus in 1840. The entire genus is endemic to southern Western Australia.

== Species list ==
The following is a list of formally described Hypocalymma species and subspecies accepted by the Australian Plant Census as at August 2020:

- Hypocalymma angustifolium (Endl.) Schauer – white myrtle, pink-flowered myrtle
- Hypocalymma asperum Schauer
- Hypocalymma connatum Strid & Keighery
- Hypocalymma cordifolium Lehm. ex Schauer
- Hypocalymma elongatum (Strid & Keighery) Rye
- Hypocalymma ericifolium Benth.
- Hypocalymma gardneri Strid & Keighery
- Hypocalymma hirsutum Strid & Keighery
- Hypocalymma jessicae Strid & Keighery – Barrens myrtle
- Hypocalymma linifolium Turcz.
- Hypocalymma longifolium F.Muell. – long-leaved myrtle
- Hypocalymma melaleucoides Gardner ex Strid & Keighery – Fitzgerald myrtle
- Hypocalymma minus (Strid & Keighery) Keighery
- Hypocalymma myrtifolium Turcz.
- Hypocalymma phillipsii Harv.
- Hypocalymma puniceum C.A.Gardner – large myrtle
- Hypocalymma robustum (Endl.) Lindl. – Swan River myrtle
- Hypocalymma scariosum Schauer
- Hypocalymma serrulatum Strid & Keighery – early myrtle
- Hypocalymma speciosum Turcz.
- Hypocalymma strictum Schauer
- Hypocalymma sylvestre Strid & Keighery – Chittering myrtle
- Hypocalymma tenuatum Strid & Keighery – Lesueur myrtle
- Hypocalymma tetrapterum Turcz. – papillose myrtle
- Hypocalymma uncinatum Strid & Keighery
- Hypocalymma verticillare Rye
- Hypocalymma xanthopetalum F.Muell. – yellow myrtle
