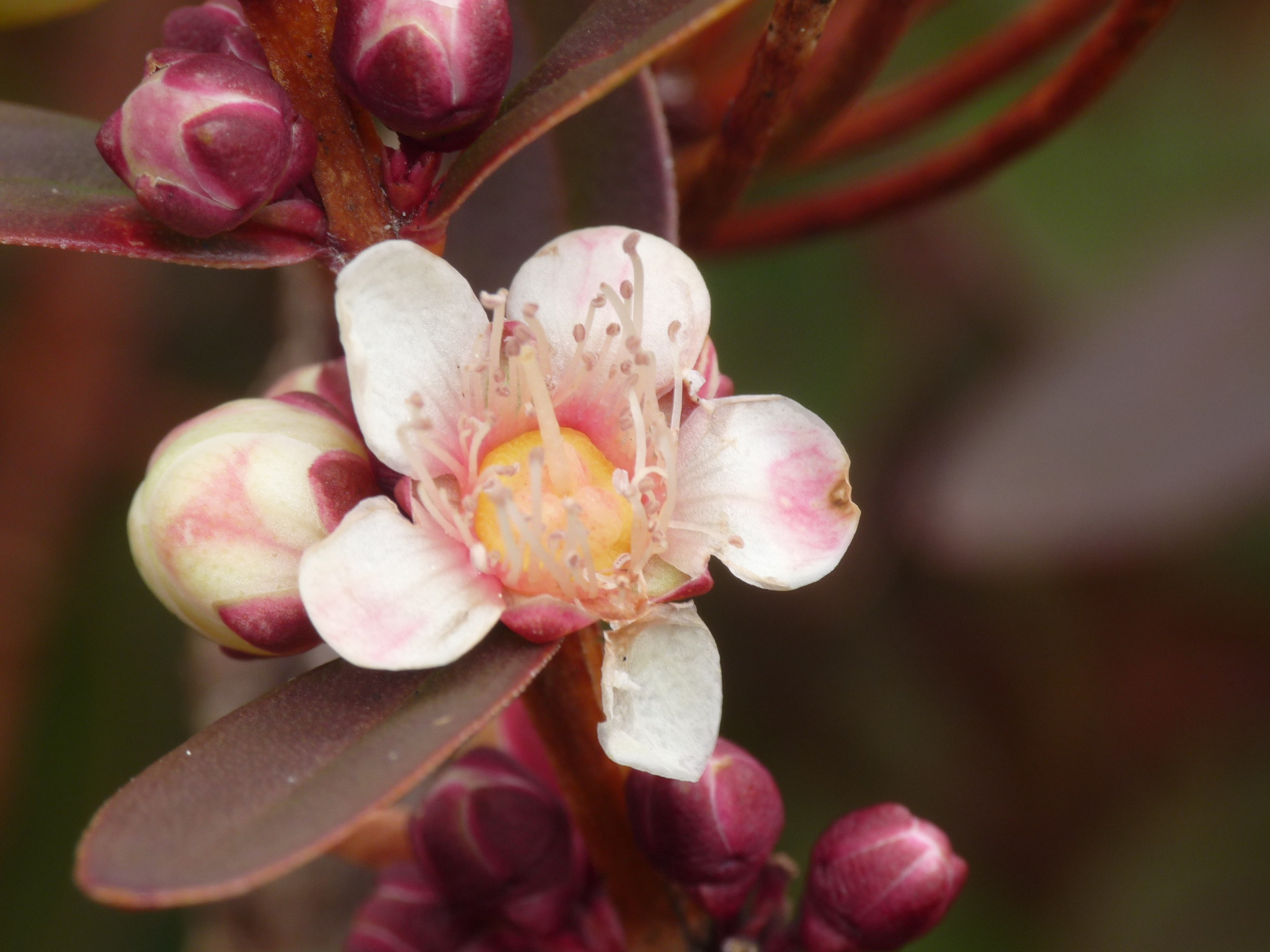

Conservation status
- Priority Four — Rare Taxa (DEC)

Scientific classification
- Kingdom: Plantae
- Clade: Tracheophytes
- Clade: Angiosperms
- Clade: Eudicots
- Clade: Rosids
- Order: Myrtales
- Family: Myrtaceae
- Genus: Hypocalymma
- Species: H. phillipsii

Binomial name
- Hypocalymma phillipsii Harv.

= Hypocalymma phillipsii =

Species of flowering plant

Hypocalymma phillipsii is a species of flowering plant in the myrtle family Myrtaceae, and is endemic to a restricted part of Western Australia. It is an erect, spreading shrub with elliptic to very broadly egg-shaped leaves, and white flowers arranged singly or in pairs in leaf axils, with 30 to 50 stamens in several rows.

== Description ==
Hypocalymma phillipsii is an open shrub with many stems, that typically grows to a height of up to 1 m (3 ft 3 in), sometimes to 1.5 m (4 ft 11 in), and 1.5 m (4 ft 11 in) wide. Its leaves are arranged in opposite pairs, elliptic to very broadly egg-shaped, 15–40 mm (0.59–1.57 in) long and 8–20 mm (0.31–0.79 in) wide, with the midrib indented on the upper side and prominent on the lower side. The flowers are mostly borne in pairs in leaf axils and are 14–18 mm (0.55–0.71 in) in diameter, sessile or on a peduncle up to 1 mm (0.039 in) long. The sepal lobes are very broadly egg-shaped to elliptic, 2.0–3.5 mm (0.079–0.138 in) long and 2.5–3.5 mm (0.098–0.138 in) wide. The petals are white, 6–9 mm (0.24–0.35 in) long and there are 30 to 50 stamens in two rows, the longest filaments 4–6 mm (0.16–0.24 in) long. Flowering occurs from September to November and the fruit is 3.0–4.3 mm (0.12–0.17 in) long and 4–5 mm (0.16–0.20 in) wide.

== Taxonomy ==
Hypocalymma phillipsii was first formally described in 1858 by William Henry Harvey in the Natural History Review from specimens raised in the Botanic Gardens of Dublin in 1856–58, from seeds received from the "neighbourhood of King George's Sound", collected by William Phillips. The specific epithet (phillipsii) honours William Phillips, a botanist and schoolmaster.

== Distribution and habitat ==
This species of Hypocalymma is restricted to the Stirling Range, where it grows in sandy soil amongst rocks in dense scrub on hillslopes at altitudes between 400 and 800 m (1,300 and 2,600 ft).

== Conservation status ==
Hypocalymma phillipsii is listed as "Priority Four" by the Government of Western Australia Department of Biodiversity, Conservation and Attractions, meaning that is rare or near threatened.
