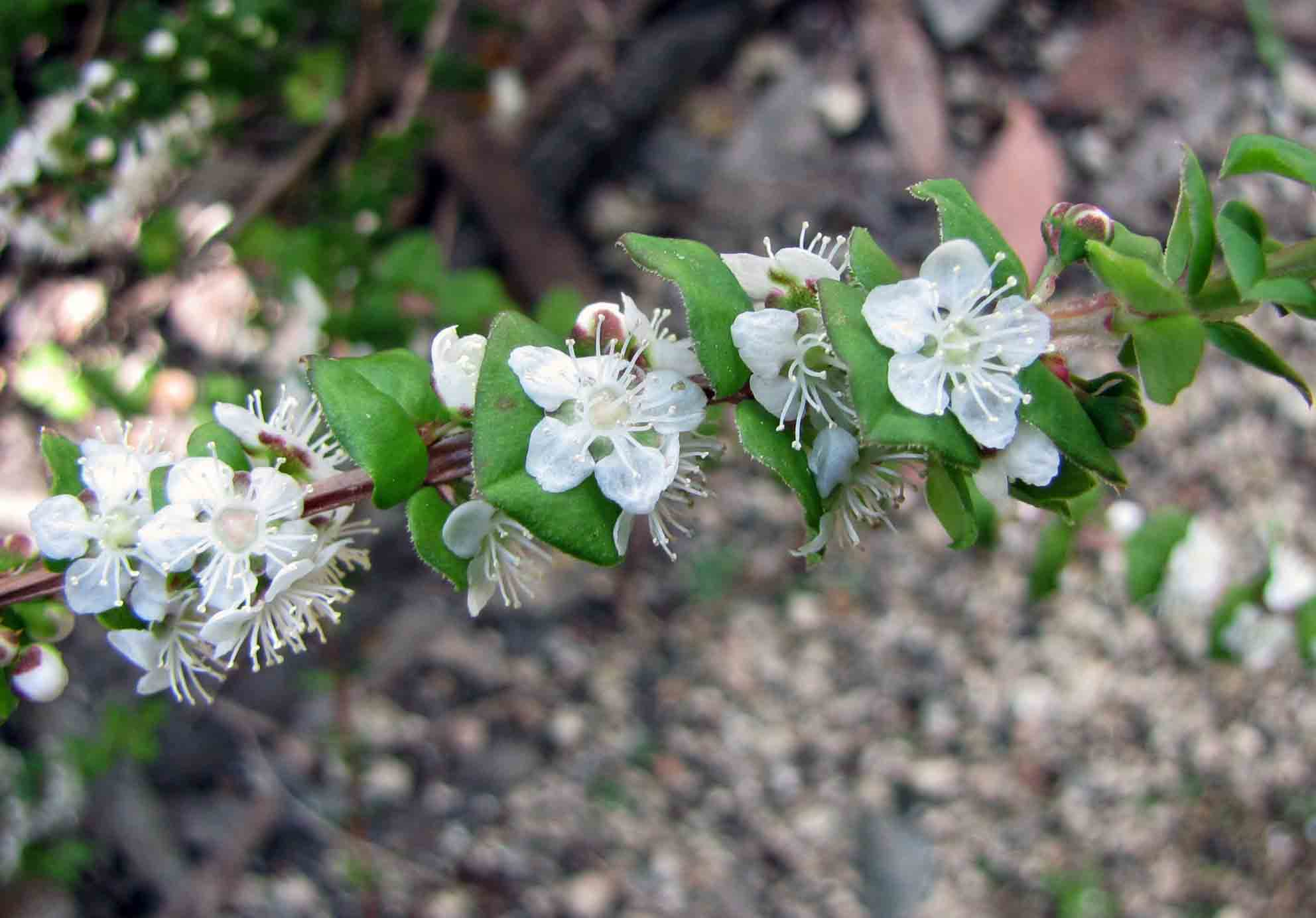

Scientific classification
- Kingdom: Plantae
- Clade: Tracheophytes
- Clade: Angiosperms
- Clade: Eudicots
- Clade: Rosids
- Order: Myrtales
- Family: Myrtaceae
- Genus: Hypocalymma
- Species: H. cordifolium

Binomial name
- Hypocalymma cordifolium Schauer

= Hypocalymma cordifolium =

Species of flowering plant

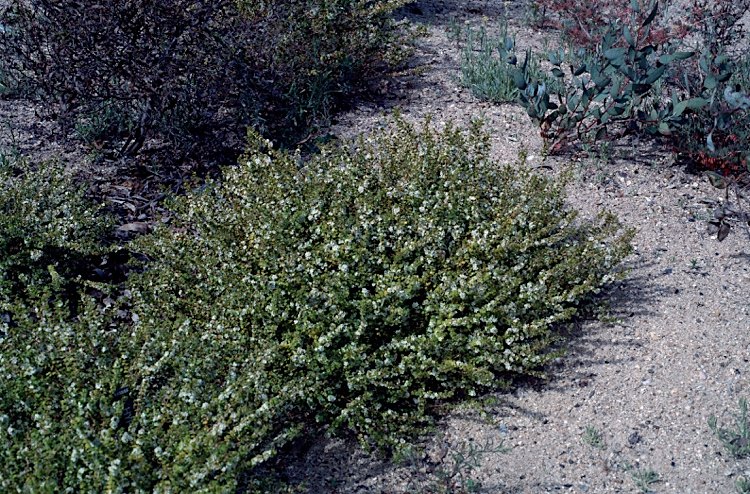
Habit in the Australian National Botanic Gardens

Hypocalymma cordifolium is a species of flowering plant in the myrtle family Myrtaceae, and is endemic to the south west of Western Australia. It is usually an low-growing shrub, but is sometimes erect, with winged stems, heart-shaped leaves arranged in opposite pairs, white or pale pink flowers mostly arranged in pairs in leaf axils, and fruit containing pearly white or pale brown seeds.

== Description ==
Hypocalymma cordifolium is usually a low-growing shrub that typically grows to a height of up to 0.2–2 m (7.9 in – 6 ft 6.7 in), but is sometimes an erect shrub up to 6 m (20 ft) high. Its young stems are prominently winged and sometimes deep red. Its leaves are heart-shaped, 6–19 mm (0.24–0.75 in) long, 9–18 mm (0.35–0.71 in) wide and sessile or on a petiole up to about 0.5 mm (0.020 in) long. The flowers are arranged in up to 16 leaf axils near the ends of branchlets, usually in groups of 2, sometimes singly or in groups of up to 4, on peduncles up to 1 mm (0.039 in) long. There are green or red-tinged bracteoles 1.3–2 mm (0.051–0.079 in) long at the base of the flowers. The sepals are broadly oblong to egg-shaped, 1.5–2.0 mm (0.059–0.079 in) long and 1.9–2.3 mm (0.075–0.091 in) wide and green or red-tinged. The petals are white or pale pink, 2.5–4.5 mm (0.098–0.177 in) long and there are 25 to 45 stamens with the filaments joined at the base. Flowering occurs all year with a peak between September and November and the fruit is a capsule 1.5–1.7 mm (0.059–0.067 in) long containing pearly white or pale brown sees 1.1–1.3 mm (0.043–0.051 in) long.

== Taxonomy ==
Hypocalymma cordifolium was first formally described in 1844 by Johannes Conrad Schauer from an unpublished manuscript by Johann Georg Christian Lehmann in Lehmann's Plantae Preissianae. The specific epithet (cordifolium) means 'heart-leaved'.

== Distribution and habitat ==
This species of Hypocalymma is found in seasonally wet areas, along creek beds or swamps between Jarrahdale and Margaret River and east along the south coast to Cape Riche.
