= Hypocalymma verticillare =

Conservation status
- Priority Two — Poorly Known Taxa (DEC)

Scientific classification
- Kingdom: Plantae
- Clade: Tracheophytes
- Clade: Angiosperms
- Clade: Eudicots
- Clade: Rosids
- Order: Myrtales
- Family: Myrtaceae
- Genus: Hypocalymma
- Species: H. verticillare

Binomial name
- Hypocalymma verticillare Rye

Species of flowering plant

Hypocalymma verticillare is a species of flowering plant in the myrtle family Myrtaceae, and is endemic to the south-west of Western Australia. It is a shrub, with egg-shaped to elliptic leaves, and white flowers with 17 to 23 stamens.

== Description ==
Hypocalymma verticillare is an erect shrub that typically grows to 20–80 cm (7.9–31.5 in) high and has slender, glabrous, prominently ridged young stems. Its leaves are egg-shaped to elliptic or narrowly elliptic, 3–6 mm (0.12–0.24 in) long, 1.8–2.3 mm (0.071–0.091 in) wide on a petiole 0.3–0.5 mm (0.012–0.020 in) wide. The edges of the leaves are curved down or rolled under, and the lower side of the leaves has many oil glands. The flowers are arranged in up to ten leaf axils on a peduncle 2.0–3.5 mm (0.079–0.138 in) long with bracteoles 0.5–0.7 mm (0.020–0.028 in) long but that fall off as the flowers open. Each flower 5–6 mm (0.20–0.24 in) in diameter on a pedicel 0.7–1.2 mm (0.028–0.047 in) long, the floral tube 0.6 mm (0.024 in) long and 1.8–2.2 mm (0.071–0.087 in) wide. The sepals are egg-shaped, about 0.7 mm (0.028 in) long and 2.3–2.7 mm (0.091–0.106 in) wide, dark red and white. The petals are white, 2.0–2.5 mm (0.079–0.098 in) long and there are 17 to 23 white stamens, the longest filaments 1.5–2.0 mm (0.059–0.079 in) long. Flowering occurs from March to May and the fruit is a capsule about 1.8 mm (0.071 in) long and 2.3 mm (0.091 in) in diameter.

== Taxonomy ==
Hypocalymma verticillare was first formally described in 2013 by Barbara Lynette Rye in the journal Nuytsia from specimens collected north-east of Walpole in 2005. The specific epithet (verticillare) means 'whorled', referring to the leaves.

== Distribution and habitat ==
This species of Hypocalymma grows in peat swamps in shrubland in the Jarrah Forest and Warren bioregions of south-western Western Australia.

== Conservation status ==
Hypocalymma uncinatum is listed as "Priority Two" by the Government of Western Australia Department of Biodiversity, Conservation and Attractions, meaning that it is poorly known and from one or a few locations.
