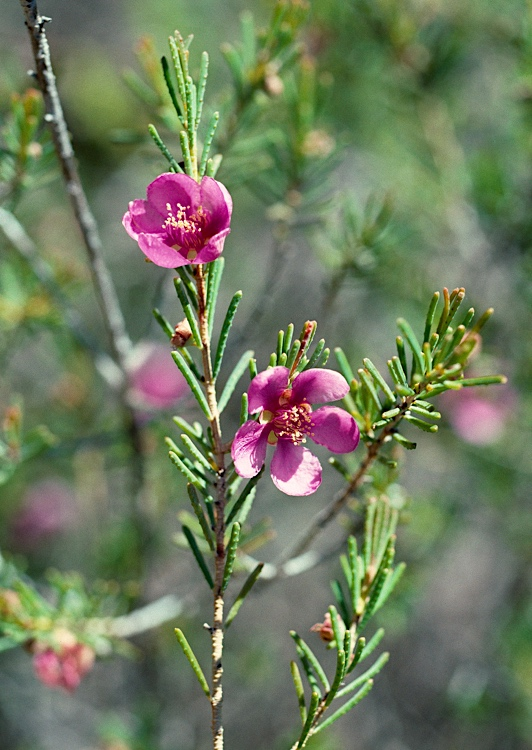
- In the garden of the Western Australian Herbarium

Scientific classification
- Kingdom: Plantae
- Clade: Tracheophytes
- Clade: Angiosperms
- Clade: Eudicots
- Clade: Rosids
- Order: Myrtales
- Family: Myrtaceae
- Genus: Hypocalymma
- Species: H. puniceum

Binomial name
- Hypocalymma puniceum C.A.Gardner

= Hypocalymma puniceum =

Species of flowering plant

Hypocalymma puniceum, commonly known as large myrtle, is a species of flowering plant in the myrtle family Myrtaceae, and is endemic to the south-west of Western Australia. It is a spreading shrub with linear leaves and bright pink flowers arranged singly in leaf axils, with 35 to 55 stamens in several rows.

== Description ==
Hypocalymma puniceum is a spreading shrub that typically grows up to 0.1–1 m (3.9 in – 3 ft 3.4 in), high and wide, its young stems four ridged to slightly four-winged. Its leaves are arranged in opposite pairs, linear, 8–16 mm (0.31–0.63 in) long and 0.5–1.1 mm (0.020–0.043 in) wide and sessile or on a petiole up to 1 mm (0.039 in) long. The leaves have 15 to 25 oil glands in two rows. The flowers are mostly borne singly in up to five leaf axils on a peduncle 4–6 mm (0.16–0.24 in) long with bracteoles 1.5–3 mm (0.059–0.118 in) long. The sepal lobes are egg-shaped to almost round, 2.5–3.5 mm (0.098–0.138 in) long and 3.0–4.5 mm (0.12–0.18 in) wide. The petals are bright pink, 8–13 mm (0.31–0.51 in) long and there are 35 to 55 stamens in two rows, the longest filaments 3.5–5 mm (0.14–0.20 in) long and joined at the base. Flowering occurs throughout the year, with a peak in the summer months, and the fruit is 2.5–3.5 mm (0.098–0.138 in) long and 3.5–4.5 mm (0.14–0.18 in) wide.

== Taxonomy ==
Hypocalymma puniceum was first formally described in 1924 by Charles Gardner in the Journal and Proceedings of the Royal Society of Western Australia from specimens he collected near Bendering in 1922. The specific epithet (puniceum) means 'crimson'.

== Distribution and habitat ==
This species of Hypocalymma is found from Ballidu to near Lake Grace in the Avon Wheatbelt and Mallee bioregions of south-western Western Australia, where it grows in lateritic sand or gravel in mallee shrubland, shrubland or heath.

== Conservation status ==
Hypocalymma puniceum is listed as "not threatened" by the Government of Western Australia Department of Biodiversity, Conservation and Attractions.
