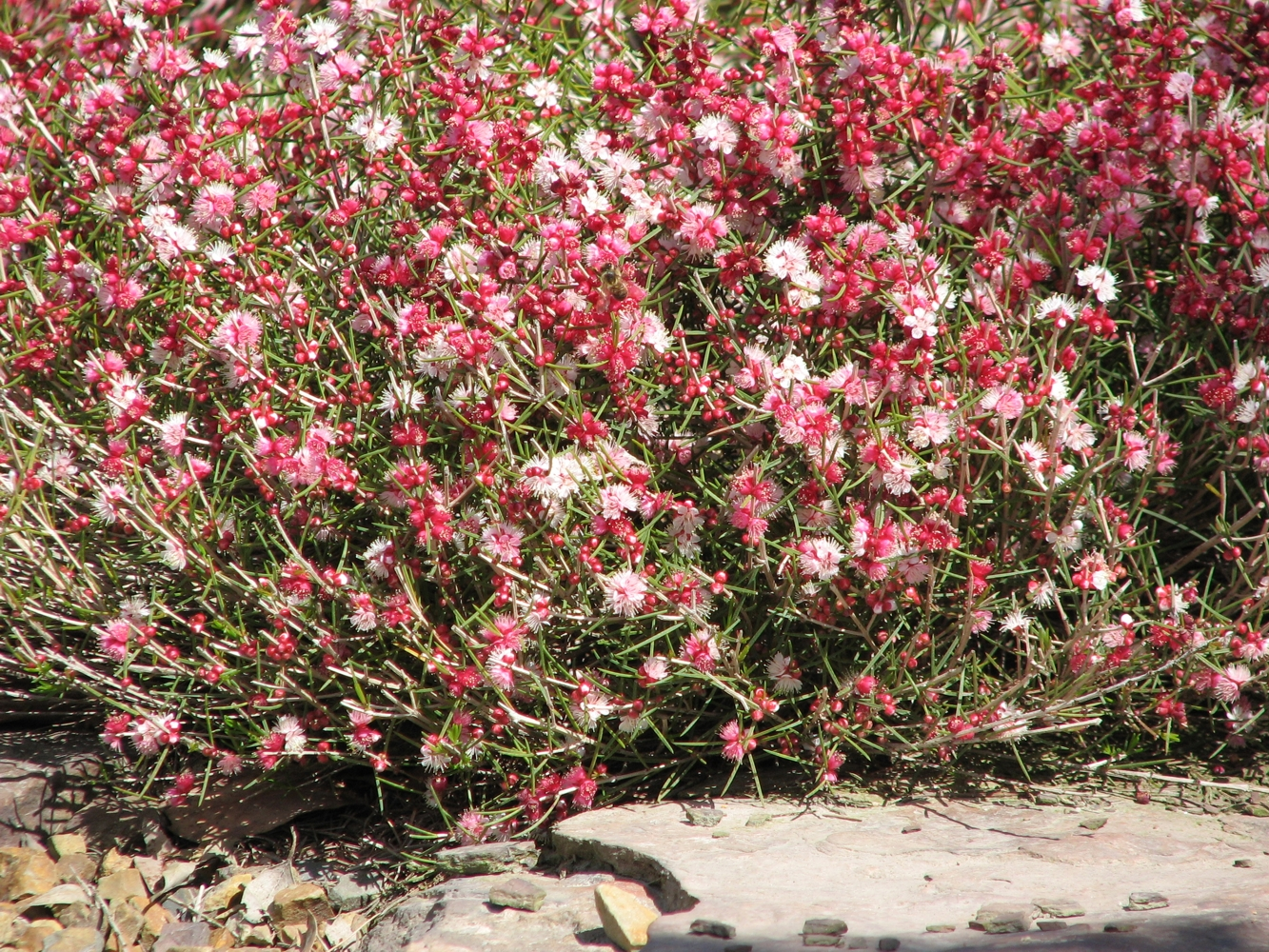

Conservation status
- Least Concern (IUCN 3.1)

Scientific classification
- Kingdom: Plantae
- Clade: Tracheophytes
- Clade: Angiosperms
- Clade: Eudicots
- Clade: Rosids
- Order: Myrtales
- Family: Myrtaceae
- Genus: Hypocalymma
- Species: H. angustifolium

Binomial name
- Hypocalymma angustifolium (Endl.) S.Schauer

Synonyms
- Hypocalymma angustifolium var. acerosum Schauer; Hypocalymma angustifolium (Endl.) Schauer var. angustifolium; Hypocalymma angustifolium var. linophyllum Schauer; Hypocalymma angustifolium var. verrucosum Schauer; Hypocalymma suavis Lindl.

= Hypocalymma angustifolium =

White myrtle

Species of flowering plant

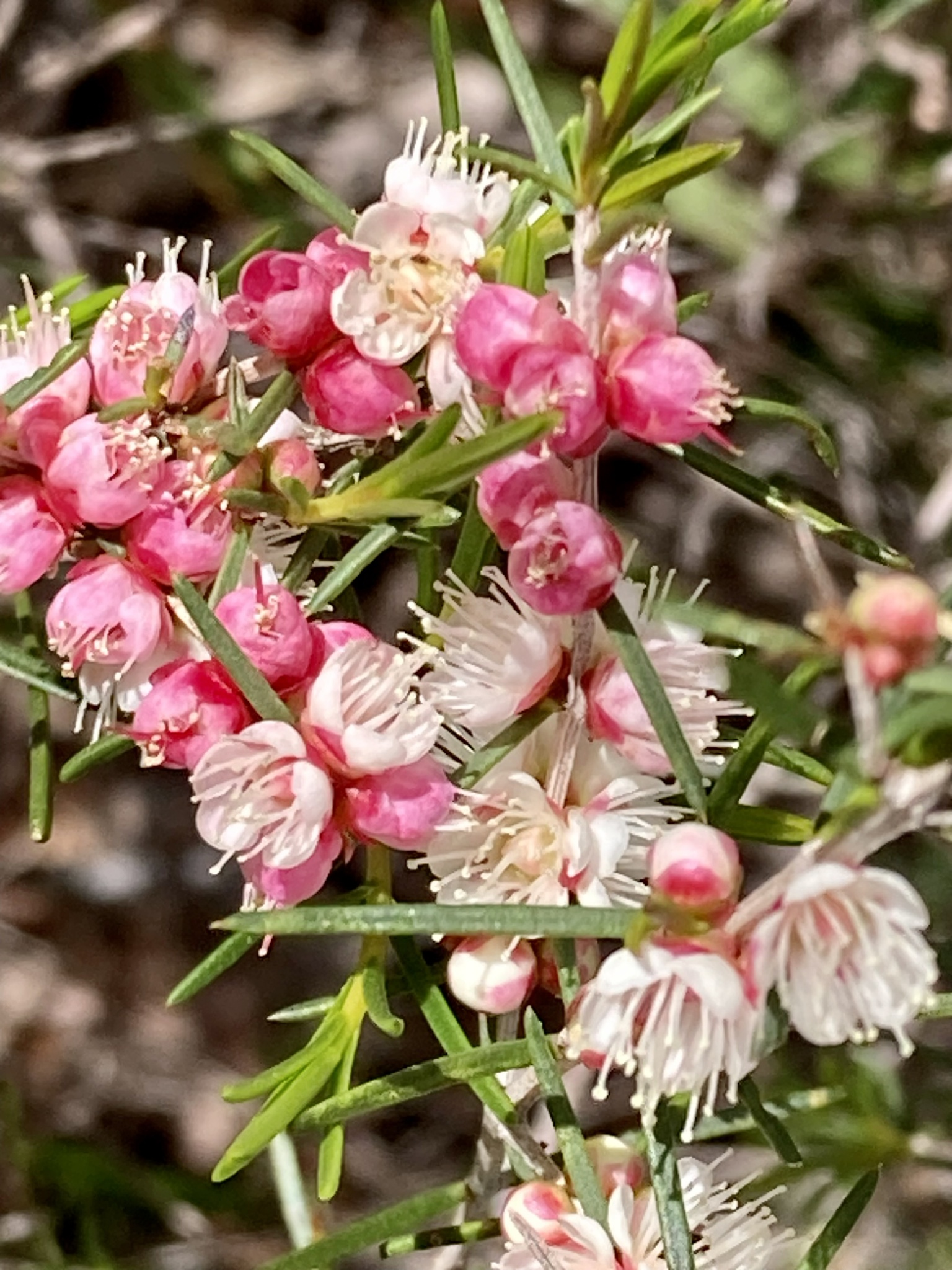
Flower detail

Hypocalymma angustifolium, commonly known as white myrtle, or pink-flowered myrtle, is a species of flowering in the myrtle family Myrtaceae. It is a subshrub or shrub endemic to the south west region of Western Australia. The Noongar peoples know the plant as koodgeed or kudjidi. It is an erect, multi-stemmed shrub with narrowly linear leaves, white or pale pink flowers.

== Description ==
Hypocalymma angustifolium is an erect, multistemmed shrub that typically grows to a height of up to 1.5 m (4 ft 11 in). Its leaves are linear, triangular in cross-section, channelled on the lower surface, and glabrous, mostly 15–30 mm (0.59–1.18 in) long and 0.8–1.2 mm (0.031–0.047 in) wide. The flowers are arranged singly or in pairs in leaf axils, and are sessile with short bracts and bracteoles at the base. The sepals are thin, membranous, about 1.5 mm (0.059 in) long. The petals are about 8 mm (0.31 in) across, white to cream coloured or occasionally pink, egg-shaped with the narrower end towards the base, 3.0–3.5 mm (0.12–0.14 in) long. There are usually 25 to 35 stamens with the filaments joined at the base, and about the same length as the petals. Flowering occurs from June to October and the fruit is a capsule 4–5 mm (0.16–0.20 in) in diameter.

== Taxonomy ==
Hypocalymma angustifolium was first formally described in 1837 by botanist Stephan Endlicher, who gave it the name Leptospermum angustifolium in Enumeratio plantarum quas in Novae Hollandiae ora austro-occidentali ad fluvium Cygnorum et in sinu Regis Georgii collegit Carolus Liber Baro de Hügel, from specimens collected by Charles von Hügel near the Swan River. In 1843, Johannes Schauer transferred the species to Hypocalymma as H. angustifolium. The specific epithet (angustifolium) means 'narrow-leaved'.

== Distribution and habitat ==
White myrtle is widespread between Eneabba and Ravensthorpe and inland to Manmanning and Wagin in the Avon Wheatbelt, Esperance Plains, Geraldton Sandplains, Jarrah Forest, Swan Coastal Plain and Warren bioregions. It grows in sandy soil, often in somewhat swampy places.

== Conservation status ==
The IUCN Red List assesses the species as Least Concern.

== Use in horticulture ==
This species can be maintained as a well-rounded bush in cultivation and is suitable for growing in a container. It requires good drainage and prefers a position in partial shade, protected from heat and wind. It has a degree of frost-resistance. Flowering stems may be cut for floral arrangements
