= Willdenowia (journal) =

- Discipline: Plant taxonomy
- Language: English
- Edited by: Nicholas Turland

Publication details
- Former name: Notizblatt des Königlichen Botanischen Gartens und Museums zu Berlin
- History: 1895–present
- Publisher: Botanic Garden and Botanical Museum Berlin, Freie Universität Berlin (Germany)
- Frequency: Triannual
- Open access: Yes
- Impact factor: 1.500 (2017)

Standard abbreviations
- ISO 4: Willdenowia

Indexing
- ISSN: 0511-9618 (print); 1868-6397 (web)
- LCCN: sf81001129
- JSTOR: 05119618
- OCLC no.: 224487211

Links
- Journal homepage; Online edition (1996-present); Pre-1996 content on JSTOR

Willdenowia: Annals of the Botanic Garden and Botanical Museum Berlin is a triannual peer-reviewed scientific journal on plant, algal, and fungal taxonomy published by the Botanic Garden and Botanical Museum Berlin, Freie Universität Berlin. It was established in 1895 as Notizblatt des Königlichen botanischen Gartens und Museums zu Berlin, and was renamed to the current title in 1954 to honour botanist Carl Ludwig Willdenow (1765-1812), director of the Royal Botanic Garden in Schöneberg near Berlin.

== Abstracting and indexing ==
The journal is abstracted and indexed in:

- Biological Abstracts
- BIOSIS
- CAB Abstracts
- CAB International
- Current Contents/Agriculture, Biology & Environmental Sciences
- Kew Bibliographic Database
- Phytomed-Select
- Science Citation Index Expanded
- Scopus
