= Gregory John Keighery =

Australian botanist and entomologist

- Born: 1950 (age 75–76)
- Scientific career
- Fields: botany
- Author abbrev. (botany): Keighery

Gregory John Keighery is an Australian botanist. Since 2003 he has been a senior research scientist at the Science and Conservation Division of the Department of Biodiversity, Conservation and Attractions of Western Australia (formerly the Department of Environment and Conservation then the Department of Parks and Wildlife). His main expertise is in the native plants of Western Australia, particularly weed flora and the Apiaceae, Liliaceae and Myrtaceae.

== Career ==
Keighery has a BSc in plant genetics from the University of Western Australia.

From 1974 to 1983 he worked in biosystematics at the Kings Park and Botanic Garden in Perth, Western Australia. In 1983–84 he was a survey biologist with the Department of Fisheries and Wildlife, and then from 1984 was a research scientist at the Department of Conservation and Land Management of Western Australia. He is a senior principal research scientist at the Department of Biodiversity, Conservation and Attractions.

Macarthuria keigheryi and Melaleuca keigheryi are named for him.

== Publications ==
- Mountains of mystery: appendix: flora list and synopsis of the flora of the Stirling Range National Park. Como: Department of Conservation and Land Management, 1993. ISBN 9780730961048.

== See also ==
Category:Taxa named by Gregory John Keighery
