= Arne Strid =

Swedish botanist (born 1943)

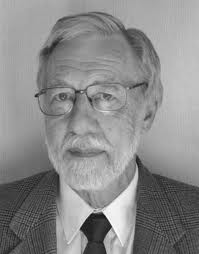
Arne Strid

Per Arne Krister Strid (born March 7, 1943, in Kristianstad, Sweden) is a Swedish botanist and expert on Greek flora.

== Biography ==
He studied botany, chemistry and genetics in the University of Lund and graduated in 1970. His doctorate was about an experimental study for the differentiation and evolution of a group of plants (Nigella arvensis complex) in the Aegean archipelago (supervisor: professor Hans Runemark) for which he also won the Jesse M. Greenman prize for the best dissertation about scientific classification of plants that year.

He was professor of botany (1973-2001) at the University of Copenhagen and distinguished visiting professor at the University of Patras, Greece (1997-1998). He was director of the Gothenburg Botanical Garden and the Natural History Museum of Göteborg (2001-2008). In 2011 he became emeritus professor at the Berlin-Dahlem Botanical Garden and Botanical Museum, in 2015 at the University of Patras, Greece and from 2017 at the National and Kapodistrian University of Athens. He is also emeritus professor at the University of Lund and the University of Copenhagen.

Besides Greece, Strid has worked and named new plant species in Turkey, Australia and South Africa.

== Family ==
He is married to biologist Barbro Jende Strid and they have two daughters. Together Arne and Barbro Strid edited an annotated re-issue of the Flora Graeca.

== Works ==
- Strid, Arne (1980). Wild flowers of Mount Olympus
- Strid, Arne (1986). Mountain Flora of Greece: Volume 1
- With Kit Tan (eds) (1991), Mountain Flora of Greece: Volume 2
- With Phitos, D.; Snogerup, S. and Greuter, W. (eds) (1995), The Red Data Book of rare and threatened plants of Greece
- With Kit Tan (eds) (1997), Flora Hellenica, Volume 1: Gymnospermae to Caryphyllaceae
- With Kit Tan (eds) (2002), Flora Hellenica, Volume 2: Nymphaeaceae to Platanaceae
- Strid, Arne (2006), Flora Hellenica Bibliography
- With Kit Tan (2009), Wildflowers of Greece
- With Strid, B. (eds) (2009, 2010, 2011, 2012, 2013), Flora Graeca Sibthorpiana. An annotated re-issue, volumes 1-10
- With Dimopoulos, P.; Raus, T.; Bergmeier, E.; Constantinidis, Th.; Iatrou, G.; Kokkini, S. and Tzanoudakis, D. (2013). Vascular plants of Greece: An annotated checklist
- Strid, Arne (2016). Atlas of the Aegean Flora
- With Erwin Bergmeier and Georgios Fotiadis (2021). Flora and Vegetation of Prespa National Park.

== Eponymy ==
The plant taxa Dichoropetalum stridii, Onosma stridii, Sagina stridii, Crocus biflorus subsp. stridii, Odontarrhena stridii and Astragalus stridii are named after him.
