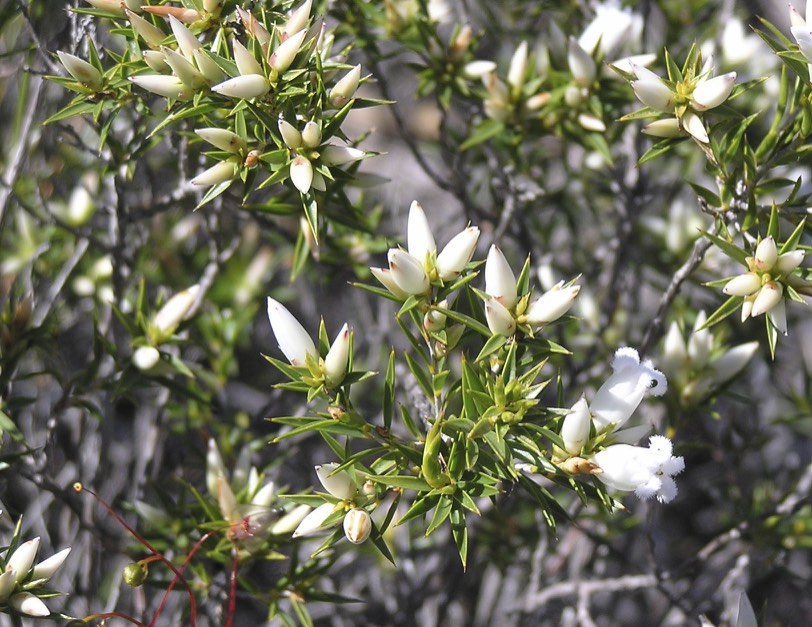
- Near Regans Ford

Scientific classification
- Kingdom: Plantae
- Clade: Tracheophytes
- Clade: Angiosperms
- Clade: Eudicots
- Clade: Asterids
- Order: Ericales
- Family: Ericaceae
- Genus: Leucopogon
- Species: L. strictus

Binomial name
- Leucopogon strictus Benth.
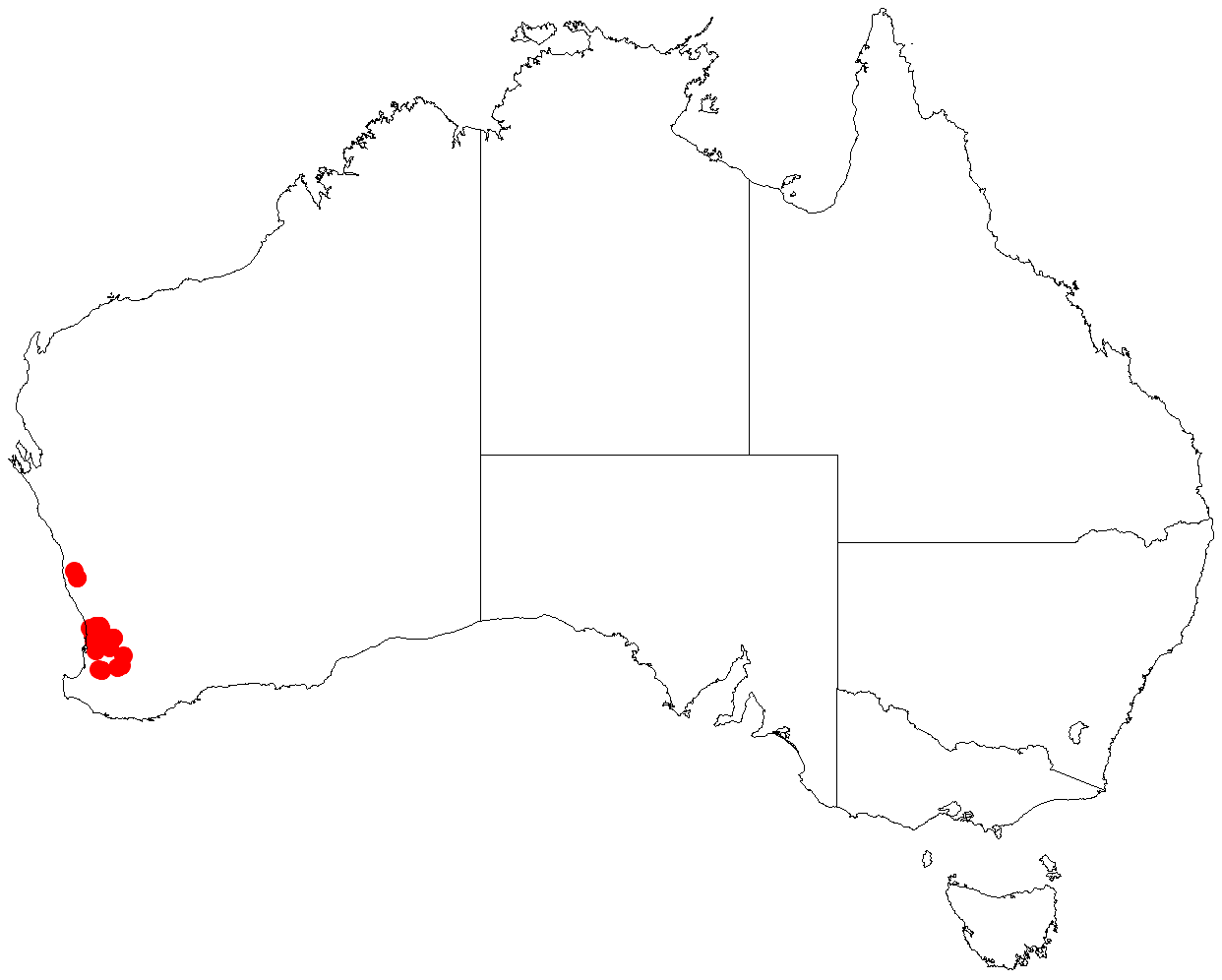
- Occurrence data from AVH

Synonyms
- Styphelia stricta (Benth.) F.Muell.

= Leucopogon strictus =

Species of plant

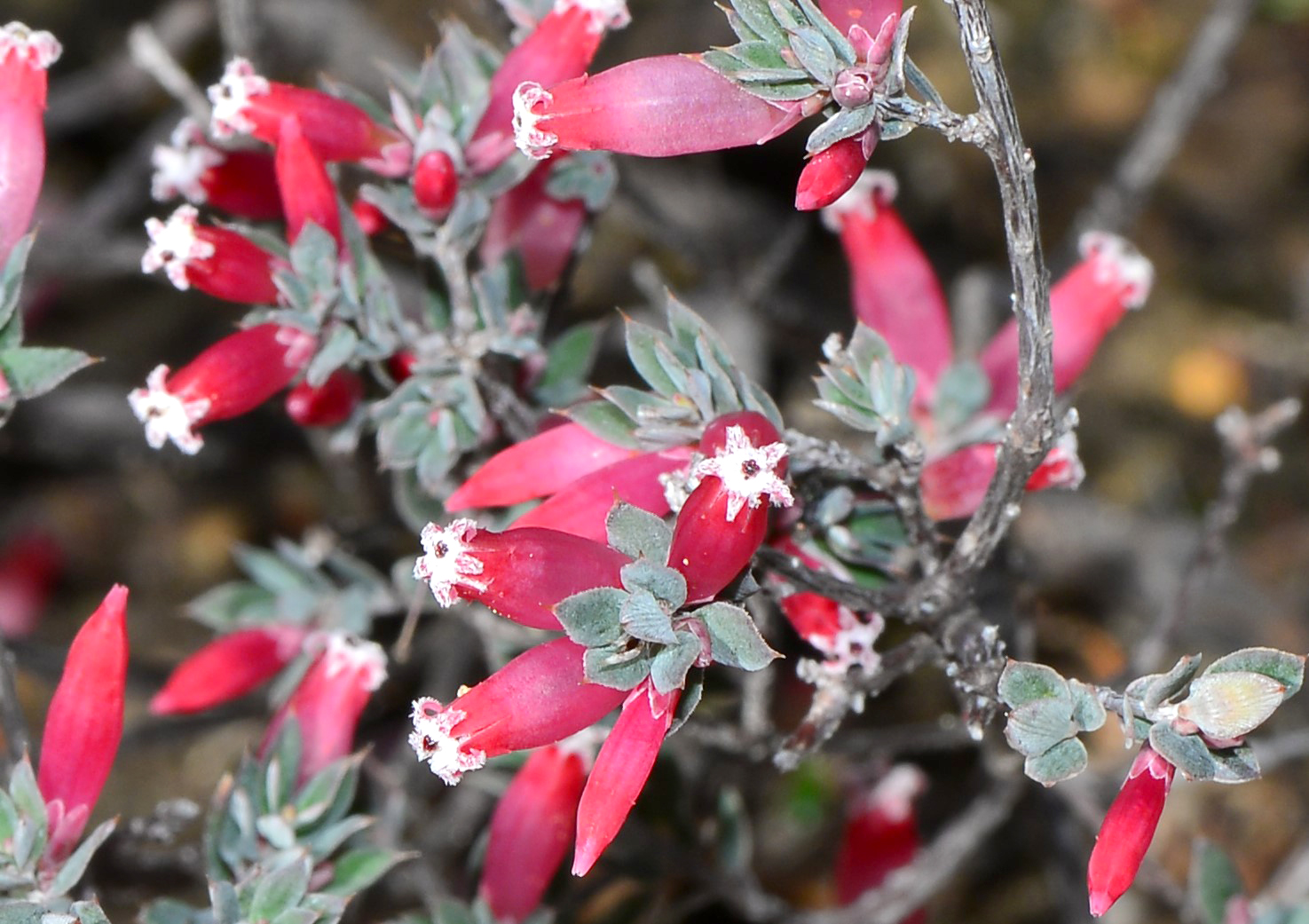
Red form

Leucopogon strictus is a species of flowering plant in the heath family Ericaceae and is endemic to the southwest of Western Australia. It is an erect, rigid, more or less glabrous shrub with oblong to lance-shaped leaves and white, tube-shaped flower arranged singly or in pairs in leaf axils.

== Description ==
Leucopogon strictus is an erect, rigid, more or less glabrous shrub with erect, oblong to lance-shaped leaves less than 12 mm (0.47 in) long. The leaves have a short, rigid point on the tip and the lower surface in often glaucous or whitish. The flowers are erect, arranged singly or in pairs in leaf axils, on a very short peduncle with short bracts and bracteoles about half as long as the sepals. The sepals are about 2 mm (0.079 in) long, and the petals white and joined at the base to form a tube about 6.5 mm (0.26 in) long, the lobes about 4 mm (0.16 in) long.

== Taxonomy and naming ==
Leucopogon strictus was first formally described in 1868 by George Bentham in Flora Australiensis from specimens collected by James Drummond. The specific epithet (strictus) means "very straight".

== Distribution ==
This leucopogon occurs near Perth in the Jarrah Forest and Swan Coastal Plain bioregions of south-western Western Australia.

== Conservation status ==
Leucopogon strictus is listed as "not threatened" by the Western Australian Government Department of Biodiversity, Conservation and Attractions.
