= Leucopogon borealis =

Conservation status
- Priority Two — Poorly Known Taxa (DEC)

Scientific classification
- Kingdom: Plantae
- Clade: Tracheophytes
- Clade: Angiosperms
- Clade: Eudicots
- Clade: Asterids
- Order: Ericales
- Family: Ericaceae
- Genus: Leucopogon
- Species: L. borealis

Binomial name
- Leucopogon borealis Hislop & A.R.Chapm.
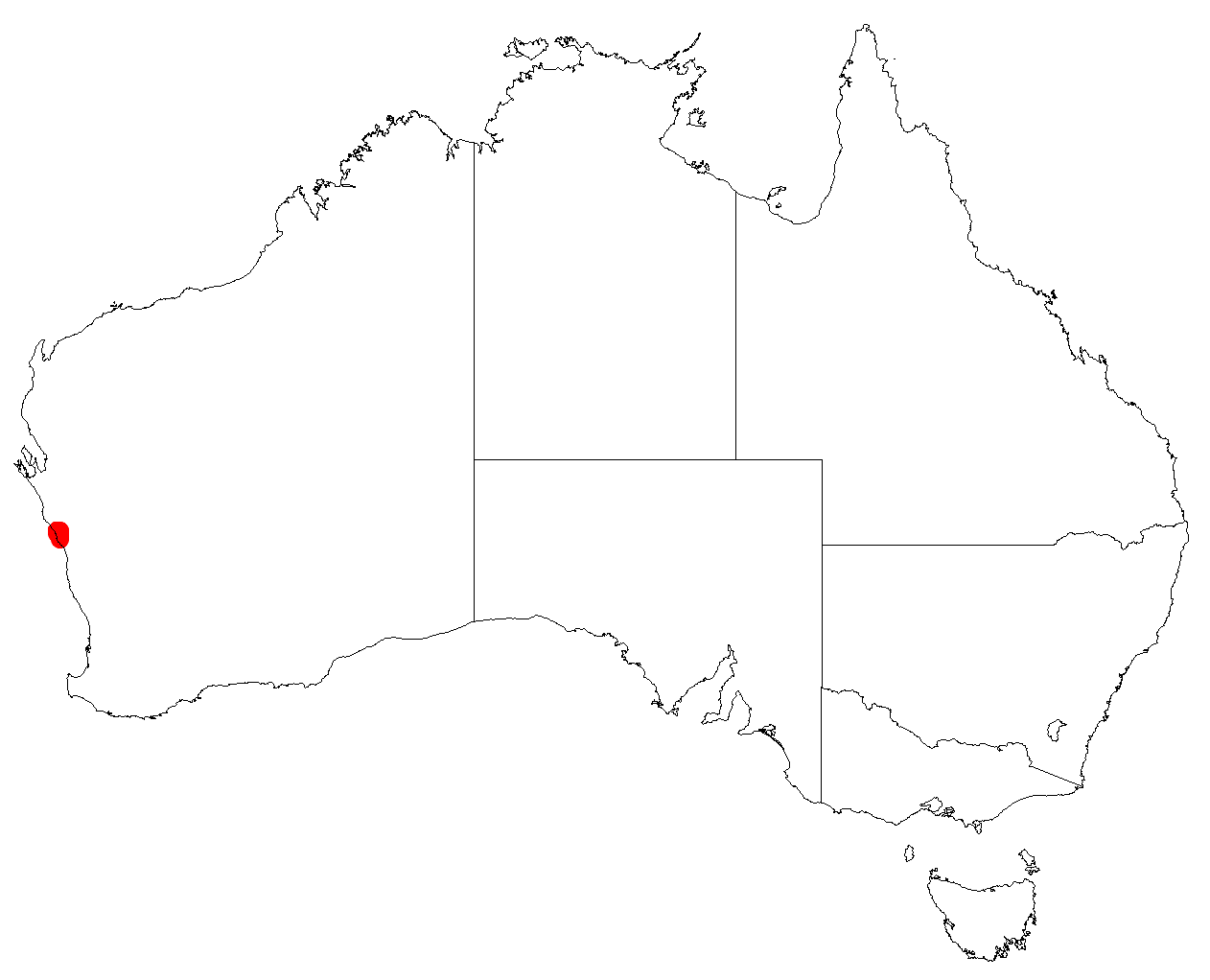
- Occurrence data from AVH

Species of plant

Leucopogon borealis is a species of flowering plant in the heath family Ericaceae and is endemic to a restricted area of the west of Western Australia. It is an erect shrub with hairy young branchlets, linear leaves and white flowers in nine to twenty upper leaf axils.

== Description ==
Leucopogon borealis is a shrub that typically grows up to about 120 cm (47 in) high and wide, its young branchlets chestnut-brown and hairy. The leaves are spirally arranged, linear or narrowly elliptic, 8–19 mm (0.31–0.75 in) long and 0.7–2.8 mm (0.028–0.110 in) wide on a hairy petiole 0.7–1.5 mm (0.028–0.059 in) long. The upper surface of the leaves is shiny and the lower surface densely hairy. The flowers are arranged singly in nine to twenty upper leaf axils 8–28 mm (0.31–1.10 in) from the ends of branchlets, with egg-shaped bracts 1.3–1.8 mm (0.051–0.071 in) long and similar slightly longer bracteoles. The sepals are egg-shaped, 2.5–3.2 mm (0.098–0.126 in) long with a purplish tinge. The petals are white and joined at the base to form a bell-shaped tube 1.0–1.5 mm (0.039–0.059 in) long and shorter than the sepals, the lobes white and 2.5–3.6 mm (0.098–0.142 in) long. Flowering mainly occurs from July to October and the fruit is a glabrous drupe 1.6–1.8 mm (0.063–0.071 in) long.

== Taxonomy and naming ==
Leucopogon borealis was first formally described in 2007 by Michael Clyde Hislop and Alex R. Chapman in the journal Nuytsia from specimens collected by Alex George north of Geraldton in 1993. The specific epithet (borealis) means "northern", referring to the distribution of this leucopogon, compared to others in the genus.

== Distribution and habitat ==
This leucopogon usually grows in low, dense heath on the Moresby Range between Geraldton and Northampton in the Geraldton Sandplains bioregion in the west of Western Australia.

== Conservation status ==
Leucopogon borealis is classified as "Priority Two" by the Western Australian Government Department of Biodiversity, Conservation and Attractions, meaning that it is poorly known and from only one or a few locations.
