= Leucopogon reflexus =

Scientific classification
- Kingdom: Plantae
- Clade: Tracheophytes
- Clade: Angiosperms
- Clade: Eudicots
- Clade: Asterids
- Order: Ericales
- Family: Ericaceae
- Genus: Leucopogon
- Species: L. reflexus

Binomial name
- Leucopogon reflexus R.Br.
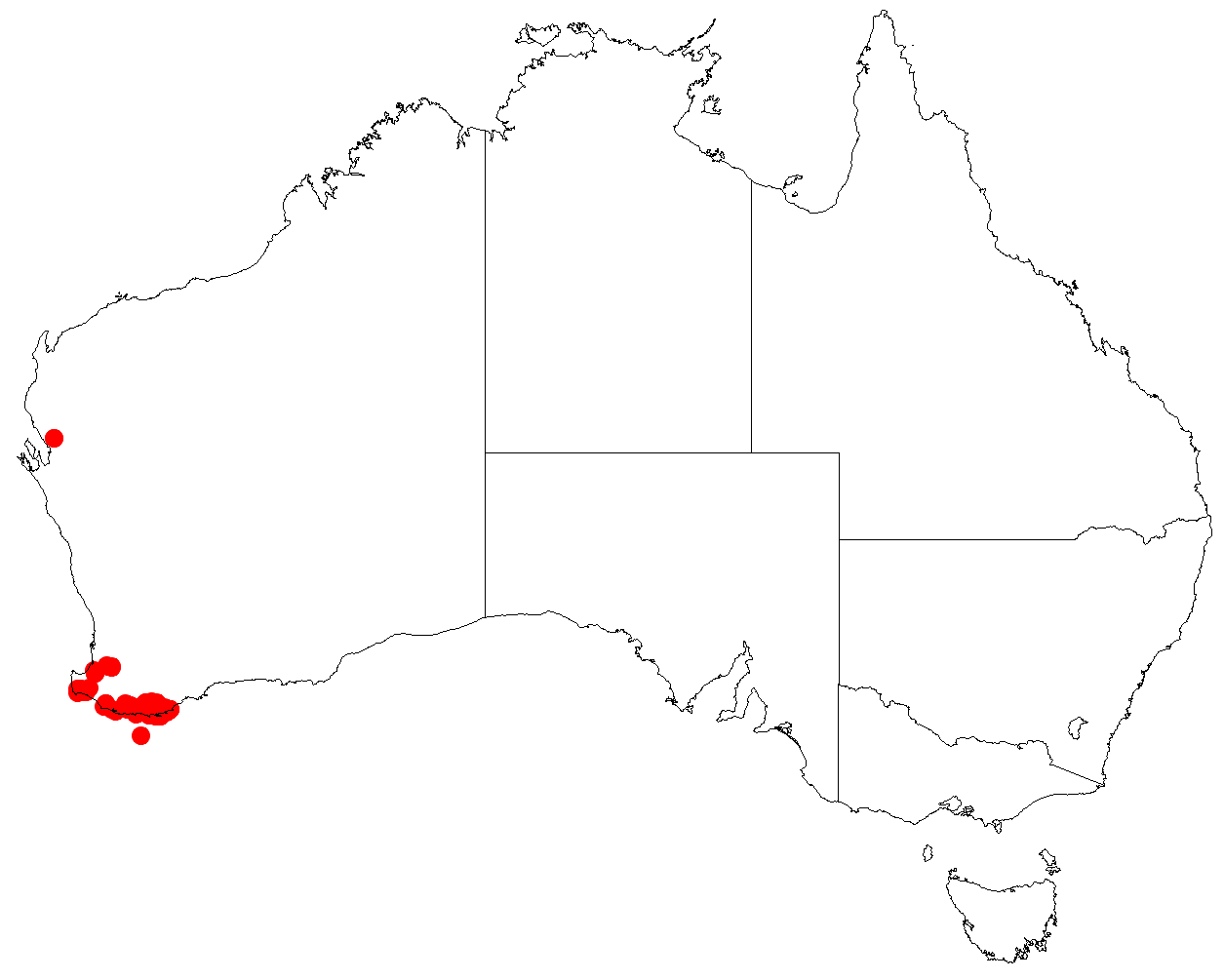
- Occurrence data from AVH

Synonyms
- Leucopogon corifolius Endl.; Styphelia corifolia (Endl.) F.Muell.; Styphelia reflexa (R.Br.) Spreng. nom. illeg.

Species of plant

Leucopogon reflexus, commonly known as heart-leaf beard-heath, is a species of flowering plant in the heath family Ericaceae and is endemic to the south-west of Western Australia. It is an erect shrub with small, usually downturned leaves and short, dense spikes of tube-shaped, white flowers.

== Description ==
Leucopogon reflexus is an erect shrub that typically grows to a height of 30–70 cm (12–28 in) and has thin, wand-like branches and hairy young branchlets. Its leaves are usually down-turned, egg-shaped to lance-shaped, and 2–4 mm (0.079–0.157 in) long. The flowers are borne in leaf axils and on the ends of branches in short, dense spikes. There are small bracts, and bracteoles about as long as the sepals. The sepals are lance-shaped, about 3 mm (0.12 in) long, the petals white and joined at the base, forming a tube shorter than the sepals, the lobes about 2 mm (0.079 in) long. Flowering occurs from July to November.

== Taxonomy ==
Leucopogon reflexus was first formally described in 1810 by Robert Brown in his Prodromus Florae Novae Hollandiae et Insulae Van Diemen. The specific epithet (reflexus) means "reflexed" or "curved backwards", referring to the leaves.

== Distribution and habitat ==
Heart-leaf beard-heath grows on coastal dunes, granite outcrops and winter-wet areas in the Esperance Plains, Jarrah Forest, Swan Coastal Plain and Warren bioregions of south-western Western Australia.

== Conservation status ==
Leucopogon reflexus is listed as "not threatened" by the Western Australian Government Department of Biodiversity, Conservation and Attractions.
