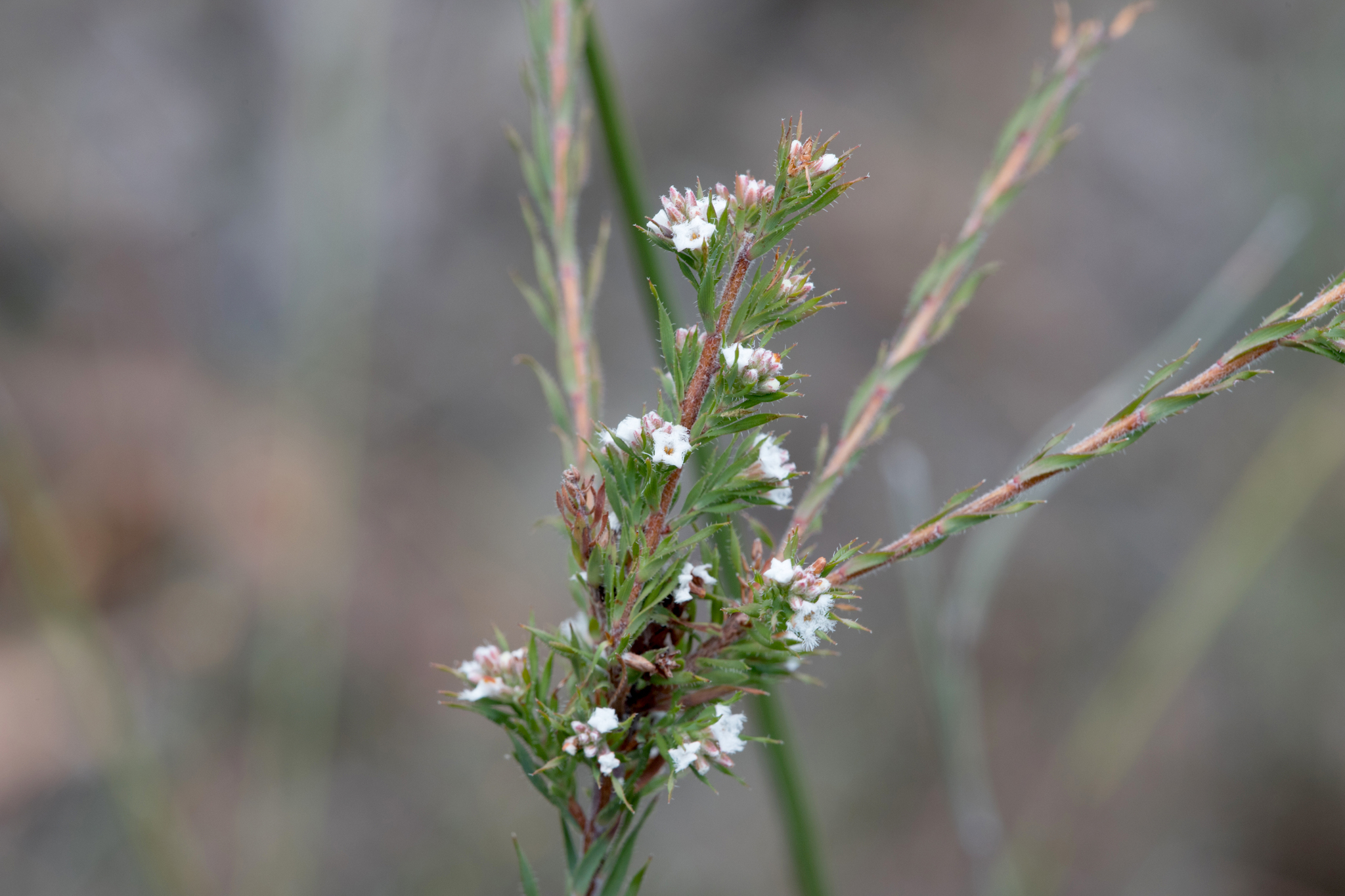
- Near Halls Gap

Scientific classification
- Kingdom: Plantae
- Clade: Tracheophytes
- Clade: Angiosperms
- Clade: Eudicots
- Clade: Asterids
- Order: Ericales
- Family: Ericaceae
- Genus: Leucopogon
- Species: L. glacialis

Binomial name
- Leucopogon glacialis Lindl.
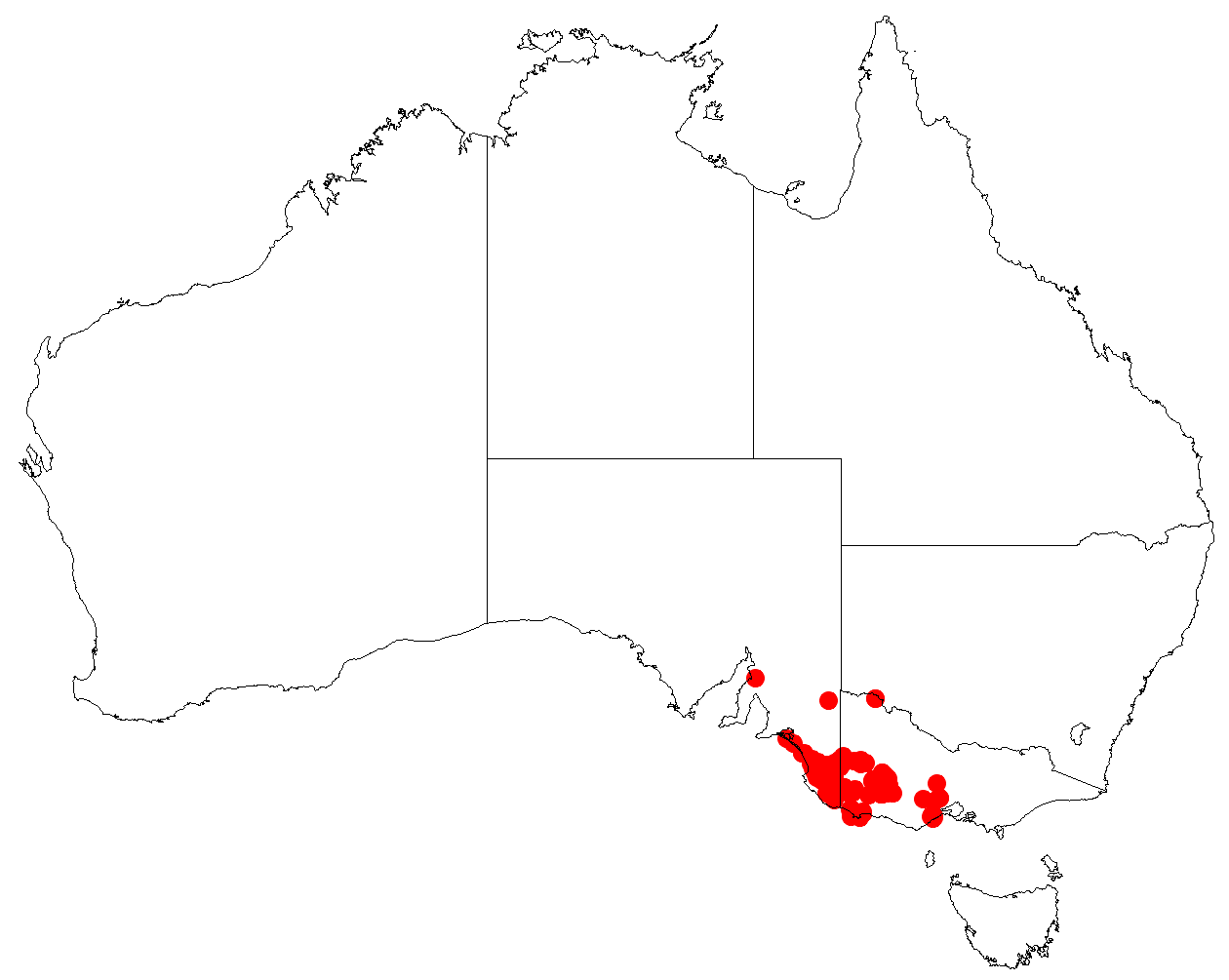
- Occurrence data from AVH

Synonyms
- Styphelia glacialis (Lindl.) F.Muell.

= Leucopogon glacialis =

Species of shrub

Leucopogon glacialis, the twisted beard-heath, is a species of flowering plant in the family Ericaceae and is endemic to south-eastern continental Australia. It is a spreading to erect shrub with narrowly egg-shaped to lance-shaped leaves, and crowded spikes of white flowers.

== Description ==
Leucopogon glacialis is a slender, spreading to erect shrub that typically grows to a height of 15–60 cm (5.9–23.6 in) and has brownish, softly-hairy branchlets. Its leaves are more or less erect, narrowly egg-shaped to lance-shaped, 3–12 mm (0.12–0.47 in) long, 0.6–1.3 mm (0.024–0.051 in) wide, and usually spirally twisted. The flowers are arranged in crowded spikes of six to twelve, 4–10 mm (0.16–0.39 in) long on the ends of branches and in upper leaf axils with egg-shaped bracteoles 0.8–1.2 mm (0.031–0.047 in) long. The sepals are oblong to egg-shaped, 1.3–2.5 mm (0.051–0.098 in) long, the petals white and 1.5–3 mm (0.059–0.118 in) long, forming a tube with lobes slightly longer than the petal tube. Flowering occurs from April to September and the fruit is an oval drupe about 2 mm (0.079 in) long.

== Taxonomy ==
Leucopogon glacialis was first formally described in 1838 by John Lindley in Thomas Mitchell's journal, Three Expeditions into the interior of Eastern Australia. The specific epithet (glacialis) means "frozen".

== Distribution and habitat ==
This leucopogon grows in heath and heathy woodland and is found mostly in the south-west of Victoria and the far south-east of South Australia.
