= Leucopogon phyllostachys =

Scientific classification
- Kingdom: Plantae
- Clade: Tracheophytes
- Clade: Angiosperms
- Clade: Eudicots
- Clade: Asterids
- Order: Ericales
- Family: Ericaceae
- Genus: Leucopogon
- Species: L. phyllostachys

Binomial name
- Leucopogon phyllostachys Benth.

Synonyms
- Styphelia phyllostachys (Benth.) F.Muell.

Species of plant

Leucopogon phyllostachys is a species of flowering plant in the heath family Ericaceae and is endemic to the south-west of Western Australia. It is an erect, glabrous shrub that typically grows to a height of 25–50 cm (9.8–19.7 in). Its leaves are mostly broadly heart-shaped to egg-shaped and more than 6 mm (0.24 in) long, sometimes egg-shaped and shorter, sometimes with a short, hard point on the tip. The flowers are arranged in cylindrical spikes on the ends of branches or in upper leaf axils. The bracteoles are less than half as long as the sepals that are about 2 mm (0.079 in) long, the petals about 4 mm (0.16 in) long, the petal lobes about the same length as the petal tube.

The species was first formally described in 1868 by George Bentham in Flora Australiensis from specimens collected by James Drummond. The specific epithet (phyllostachys) means "flower-spike leaf", referring to the upper leaves passing into bracts.

Leucopogon phyllostachys is restricted to the Stirling Range National Park and is listed as "not threatened" by the Western Australian Government Department of Biodiversity, Conservation and Attractions.
