= Leucopogon lasiostachyus =

Scientific classification
- Kingdom: Plantae
- Clade: Tracheophytes
- Clade: Angiosperms
- Clade: Eudicots
- Clade: Asterids
- Order: Ericales
- Family: Ericaceae
- Genus: Leucopogon
- Species: L. lasiostachyus

Binomial name
- Leucopogon lasiostachyus Stschegl.
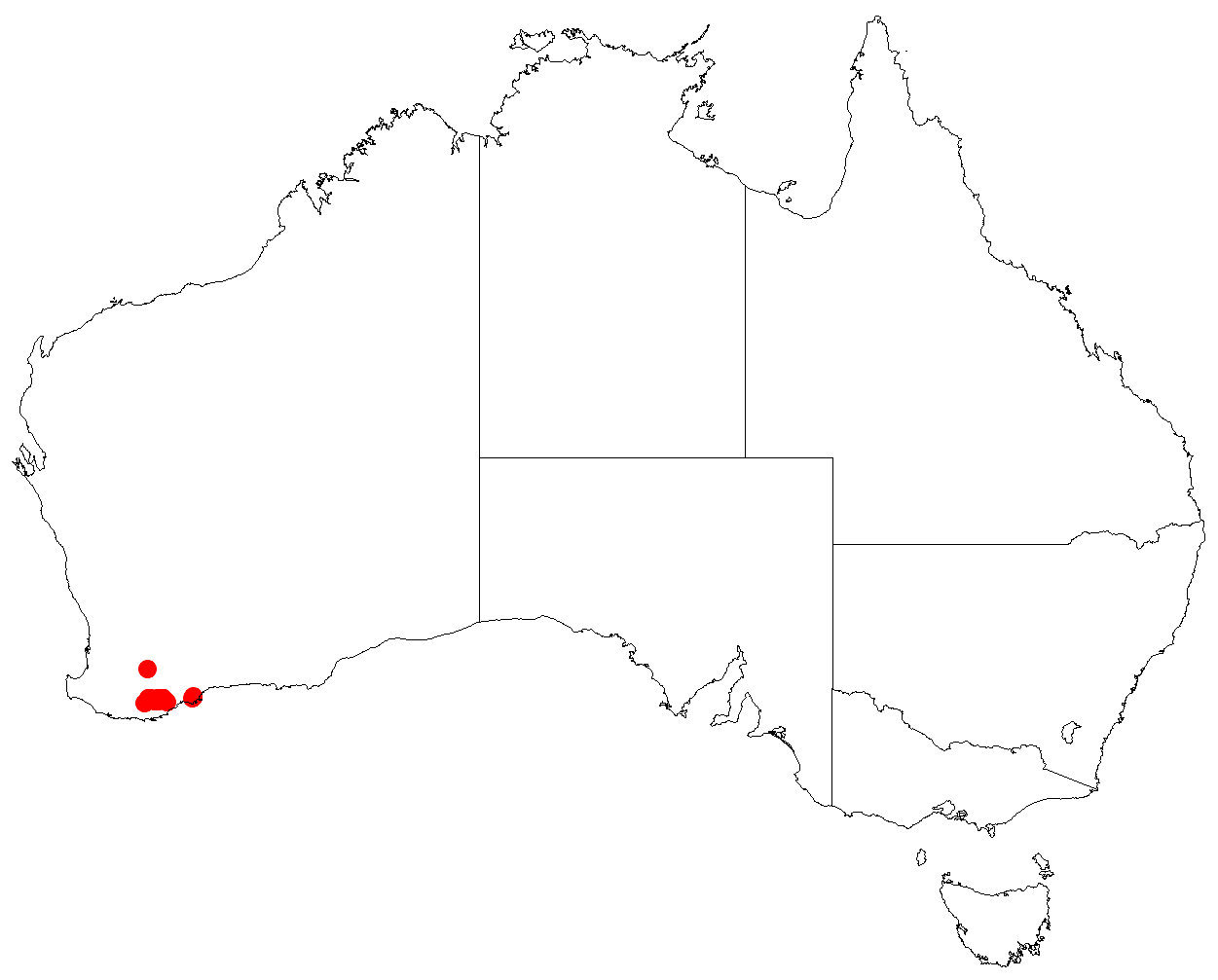
- Occurrence data from AVH

Synonyms
- Styphelia lasiostachya (Stschegl.) F.Muell.

Species of shrub

Leucopogon lasiostachyus is a species of flowering plant in the heath family Ericaceae and is endemic to the south-west of Western Australia. It is an erect shrub with egg-shaped to lance-shaped leaves and dense, cylindrical spikes of tube-shaped white flowers on the ends of branches and in leaf axils.

== Description ==
Leucopogon lasiostachyus is an erect shrub that typically grows to a height of 0.25–1.2 m (9.8 in – 3 ft 11.2 in) and has wand-like branches and foliage covered with soft hairs. The leaves are egg-shaped to lance-shaped, usually 4–8.5 mm (0.16–0.33 in) long and prominently ribbed on the lower surface. The flowers are arranged in dense, cylindrical spikes 12–25 mm (0.47–0.98 in) long on the ends of branches or in upper leaf axils with lance-shaped or linear bracts and egg-shaped bracteoles more than half as long as long as the sepals. The sepals and bracts are shaggy-hairy, the sepals about 3 mm (0.12 in) long and the petals white, forming a tube much shorter than the sepals, the lobes about twice as long as the petal tube.

== Taxonomy ==
Leucopogon lasiostachyus was first formally described in 1859 by Sergei Sergeyevich Sheglejev in the Bulletin de la Société impériale des naturalistes de Moscou from specimens collected by James Drummond. The specific epithet (lasiostachyus) means "shaggy- or woolly-hairy flower spike".

== Distribution and habitat ==
This leucopogon grows in rocky soils on sandplains, ridge tops and hills in the Esperance Plains and Jarrah Forest bioregions of south-western Western Australia.

== Conservation status ==
Leucopogon lasiostachyus is listed as "not threatened" by the Government of Western Australia Department of Biodiversity, Conservation and Attractions.
