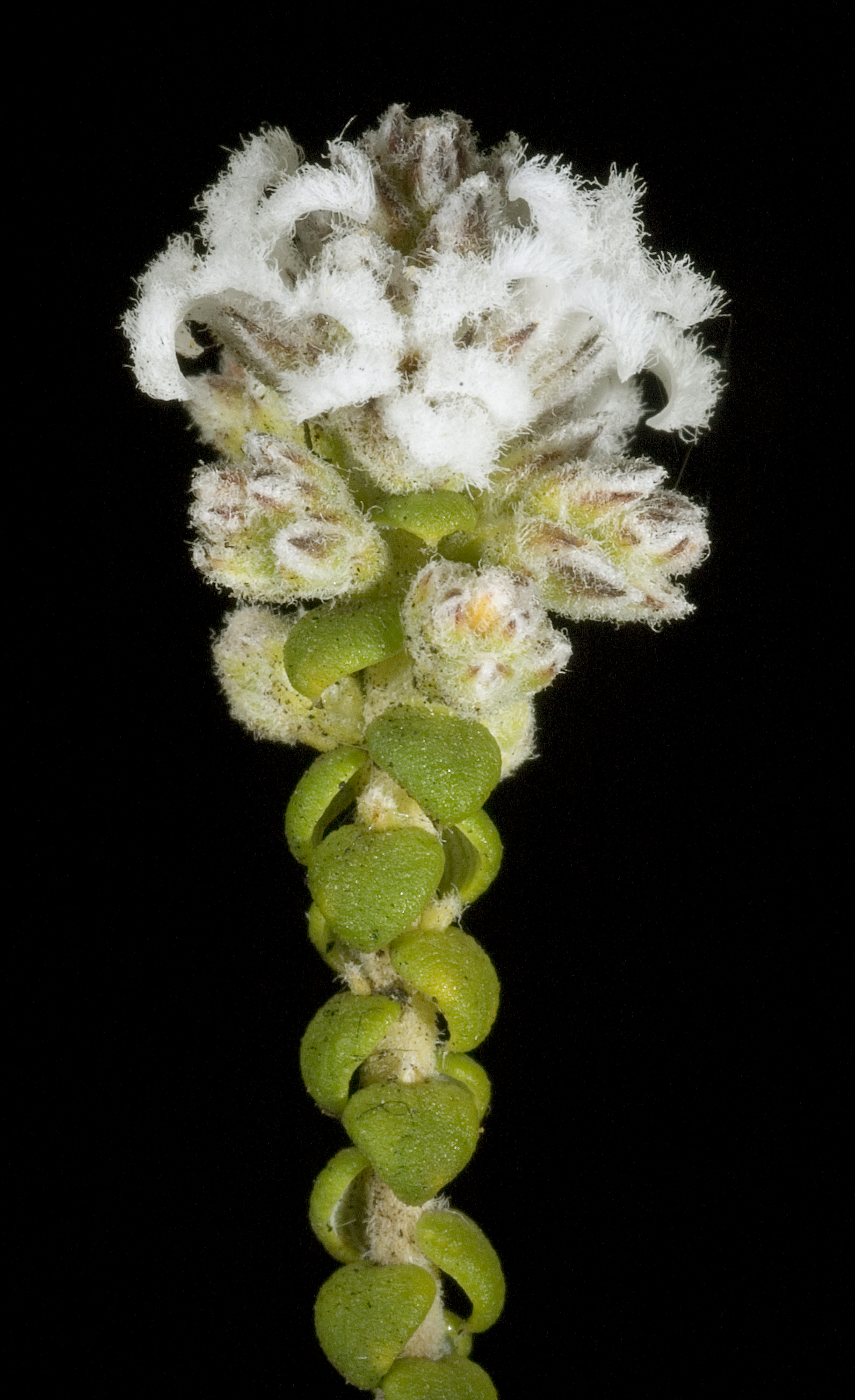

Scientific classification
- Kingdom: Plantae
- Clade: Tracheophytes
- Clade: Angiosperms
- Clade: Eudicots
- Clade: Asterids
- Order: Ericales
- Family: Ericaceae
- Genus: Leucopogon
- Species: L. gibbosus

Binomial name
- Leucopogon gibbosus Stschegl.
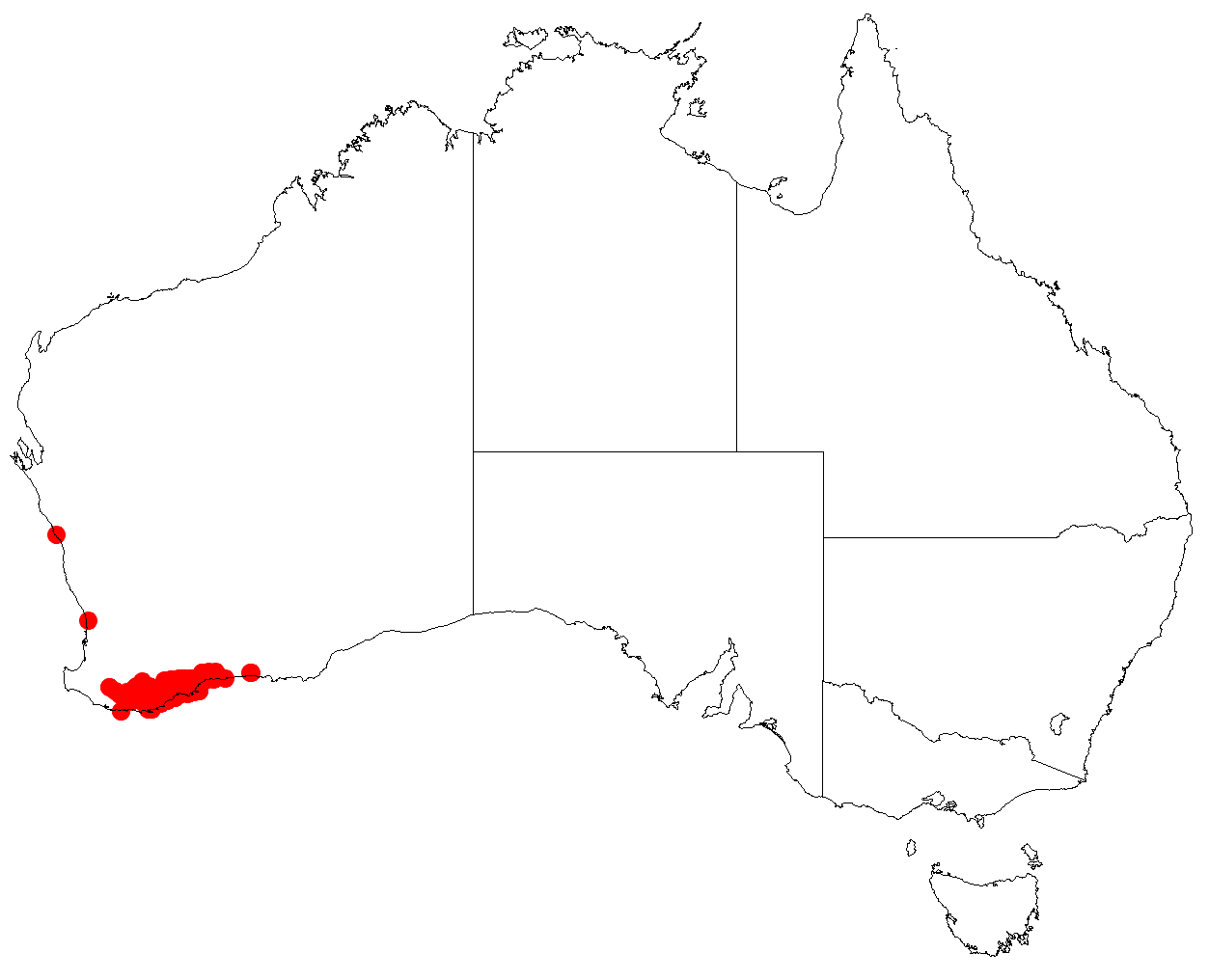
- Occurrence data from AVH

Synonyms
- Styphelia gibbosa F.Muell.

= Leucopogon gibbosus =

Species of shrub

Leucopogon gibbosus is a species of flowering plant in the heath family Ericaceae and is endemic to the south-west of Western Australia. It is a shrub with more or less round leaves and spikes of tube-shaped white flowers on the ends of branches and in leaf axils.

== Description ==
Leucopogon gibbosus is a shrub that typically grows to a height of 0.2–1 m (7.9 in – 3 ft 3.4 in), its branchlets covered with soft hairs. The leaves are more or less round with the edges curved downwards, and usually less than 2.1 mm (0.083 in) long. The flowers are arranged on the ends of branches and in leaf axils in short, dense spikes with thin, hairy bracteoles half as long as the sepals. The sepals are hairy, about 2 mm (0.079 in) long and the petals white, forming a very short tube with lobes about 2 mm (0.079 in) long.

== Taxonomy ==
Leucopogon gibbosus was first formally described in 1859 by Sergei Sergeyevich Sheglejev in the Bulletin de la Société impériale des naturalistes de Moscou from specimens collected by James Drummond. The specific epithet (gibbosus) means "swollen", referring to the leaves.

== Distribution and habitat ==
This leucopogon grows in sandy soil, often with gravel or over granite and occurs in the Avon Wheatbelt, Esperance Plains, Jarrah Forest and Mallee bioregions of south-western Western Australia.

== Conservation status ==
Leucopogon gibbosus is listed as "not threatened" by the Government of Western Australia Department of Biodiversity, Conservation and Attractions.
