= Leucopogon remotus =

Conservation status
- Priority One — Poorly Known Taxa (DEC)

Scientific classification
- Kingdom: Plantae
- Clade: Tracheophytes
- Clade: Angiosperms
- Clade: Eudicots
- Clade: Asterids
- Order: Ericales
- Family: Ericaceae
- Genus: Leucopogon
- Species: L. remotus

Binomial name
- Leucopogon remotus Hislop
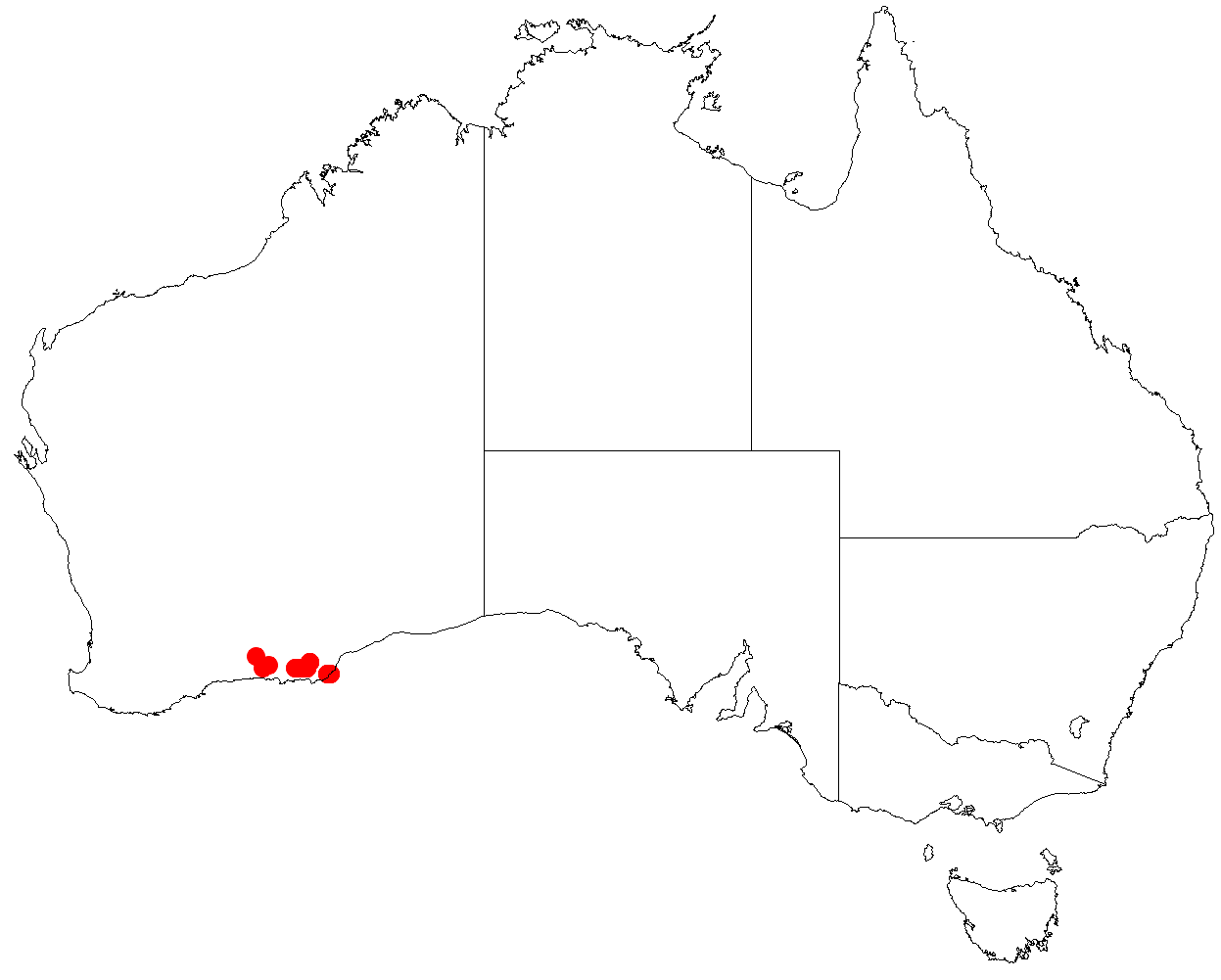
- Occurrence data from AVH

Species of plant

Leucopogon remotus is a species of flowering plant in the heath family Ericaceae and is endemic to the south-west of Western Australia. It is an erect shrub with a single stem at ground level, narrowly egg-shaped to egg-shaped leaves and erect clusters of 4 to 11 white, tube-shaped flowers usually on the ends of branches.

== Description ==
Leucopogon remotus is an erect shrub that typically grows up to 70 cm (28 in) high and wide, and has a single stem at ground level. The leaves are spirally arranged, usually pointed upwards, narrowly egg-shaped to egg-shaped, 4.0–9.5 mm (0.16–0.37 in) long and 1.9–3.0 mm (0.075–0.118 in) wide on petiole 0.9–1.7 mm (0.035–0.067 in) long. Both surfaces of the leaves are more or less glabrous, the lower surface paler with 5 to 7 prominent veins. The flowers are arranged in groups of 4 to 11, mostly only on the ends of branches, with narrowly egg-shaped bracts 1.0–1.2 mm (0.039–0.047 in) long and egg-shaped bracteoles 1.1–1.6 mm (0.043–0.063 in) long. The sepals are egg-shaped, 1.7–2.1 mm (0.067–0.083 in) long, and the petals white and joined at the base to form a broadly bell-shaped tube 1.3–2.0 mm (0.051–0.079 in) long and slightly longer than the sepals, the lobes 2.0–2.3 mm (0.079–0.091 in) long and densely bearded on the inner surface. Flowering has been observed in June and July and the fruit is a flattened spherical drupe 1.4–1.6 mm (0.055–0.063 in) long.

== Taxonomy and naming ==
Leucopogon remotus was first formally described in 2016 by Michael Clyde Hislop in the journal Nuytsia from specimens he collected north-east of Esperance in 2006. The specific epithet (remotus) alludes to the remote, sparsely populated country where the species occurs.

== Distribution and habitat ==
This leucopogon grows in mallee woodland in a restricted area north-east of Esperance in the Esperance plains and Mallee bioregions of south-western Western Australia.

== Conservation status ==
Leucopogon remotus is listed as "Priority One" by the Government of Western Australia Department of Biodiversity, Conservation and Attractions, meaning that it is known from only one or a few locations which are potentially at risk.
