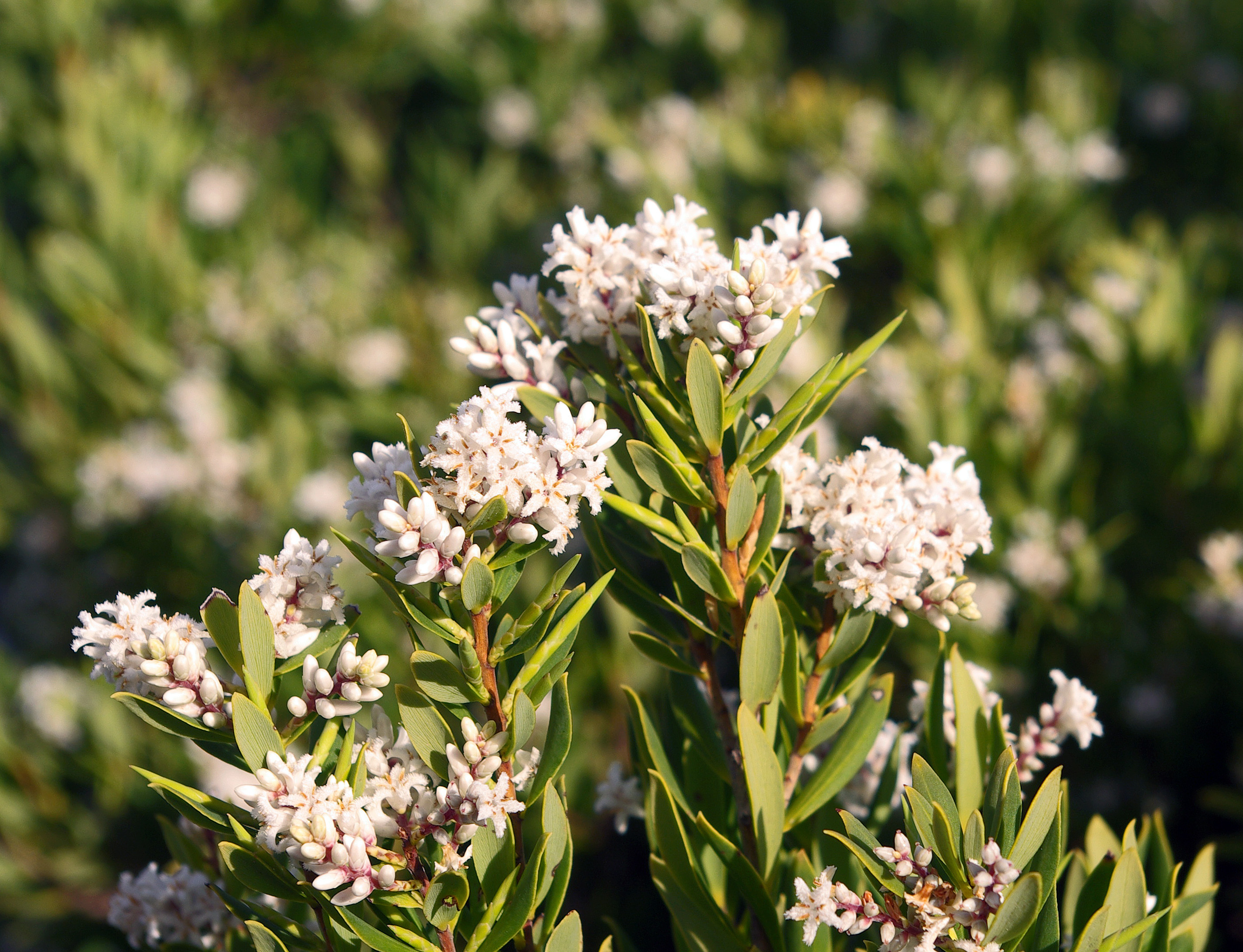
- Leucopogon parviflorus

Scientific classification
- Kingdom: Plantae
- Clade: Tracheophytes
- Clade: Angiosperms
- Clade: Eudicots
- Clade: Asterids
- Order: Ericales
- Family: Ericaceae
- Subfamily: Epacridoideae
- Tribe: Styphelieae
- Genus: Leucopogon; R.Br.

Synonyms
- List: Axonanthus J.M.Powell nom. inval., pro syn.; Choristemon H.B.Will.; Gynoconus nom. inval., pro syn.; Leucopogon sect. Perojoa (Cav.) Benth.; Peroa Pers. orth. var.; Perojoa Cav. nom. rej.; Phanerandra Stschegl.; Styphelia sect. Leucopogon (R.Br.) Maiden & Betche nom. illeg.; Styphelia sect. Perojoa (Cav.) Kuntze; Styphelia subg. Leucopogon (R.Br.) Drude

= Leucopogon =

Genus of flowering plants

Leucopogon is a genus of about 150–160 species of shrubs or small trees in the family Ericaceae, in the section of that family formerly treated as the separate family Epacridaceae. They are native to Australia, New Zealand, New Caledonia, the western Pacific Islands and Malaysia, with the greatest species diversity in the south-west of Western Australia. Plants in this genus have leaves with a few more or less parallel veins, and tube-shaped flowers usually with a white beard inside.

== Description ==
Plants in the genus Leucopogon range from prostrate shrubs to small trees. The leaves are arranged alternately and usually have about three, more or less parallel veins visible on the lower surface. The flowers are arranged in leaf axils or on the ends of branchlets either singly or in spikes of a few to many flowers. There is a single egg-shaped to circular bract and a pair of similar bracteoles at the base of each flower immediately below the five sepals. The sepals are similar to the bracts but larger. The petals are fused to form a tube with the five petal tips rolled back or spreading, usually with a beard of white hairs inside. The stamens are attached to the tube near its tip and have a short filament and the tip of the style is thin. The fruit is a drupe.

== Taxonomy and naming ==
The genus Leucopogon was first formally described in 1810 by Robert Brown in his Prodromus.

In 2005, following cladistic analysis, in a paper published in Australian Systematic Botany, Christopher John Quinn and others transferred some species previously known as species of Leucopogon to other genera, including Androstoma Hook.f., Acrotriche R.Br., Acrothamnus Quinn and Agiortia Quinn. These species include the former L. colensoi, L. milliganii, L. maccraei, L. montanus. These, and other changes proposed have been accepted by the Australian Plant Census ("APC") but not the change of L. melaleucoides to Acrothamnus melaleucoides.

Further molecular phylogenetic analysis of Styphelia and related genera by Crayn and others in 2018 have led to further proposed changes, not yet assessed by the APC as at April 2020. These changes include moving 75 species of Leucopogon to Styphelia.

The genus name, Leucopogon is derived from ancient Greek words meaning "white" and "beard", referring to the petal tube.

=== Species list ===
The following is a list of species accepted by the Plants of the World Online as at April 2021:

- Leucopogon acicularis Benth. (WA)
- Leucopogon affinis R.Br. – lance beard-heath (SA, Qld, NSW, Vic, Tas)
- Leucopogon alternifolius R.Br. (WA)
- Leucopogon altissimus Hislop (WA)
- Leucopogon amplectens Ostenf. (WA)
- Leucopogon amplexicaulis (Rudge) R.Br. – beard heath (NSW)
- Leucopogon apiculatus R.Br. (WA)
- Leucopogon assimilis R.Br. (WA)
- Leucopogon atherolepis Stschegl. (WA)
- Leucopogon audax Hislop (WA)
- Leucopogon australis R.Br. – spiked beard-heath (WA, Vic, Tas)
- Leucopogon borealis Hislop & A.R.Chapm. (WA)
- Leucopogon bossiaea (F.Muell.) Benth. (WA)
- Leucopogon bracteolaris Benth. (WA)
- Leucopogon canaliculatus Hislop (WA)
- Leucopogon capitellatus DC. (WA)
- Leucopogon carinatus R.Br. (WA)
- Leucopogon cinereus E.Pritz. (WA)
- Leucopogon cochlearifolius Strid (WA)
- Leucopogon collinus (Labill.) R.Br. – fringed beard-heath (NSW, Vic, Tas)
- Leucopogon compactus Stschegl. (WA)
- Leucopogon concurvus F.Muell. (SA)
- Leucopogon cordatus Sond. (WA)
- Leucopogon corymbiformis Hislop (WA)
- Leucopogon costatus (F.Muell.) J.M.Black (SA, Vic)
- Leucopogon cryptanthus Benth. (WA)
- Leucopogon cucullatus R.Br. (WA)
- Leucopogon cuneifolius Stschegl. (WA)
- Leucopogon darlingensis Hislop (WA)
  - Leucopogon darlingensis Hislop subsp. darlingensis (WA)
  - Leucopogon darlingensis subsp. rectus Hislop (WA)
- Leucopogon decrescens Hislop (WA)
- Leucopogon denticulatus W.Fitzg. (WA)
- Leucopogon distans R.Br. (WA)
- Leucopogon diversifolius Hislop (WA)
- Leucopogon elatior Sond. (WA)
- Leucopogon elegans Sond. (WA)
  - Leucopogon elegans Sond. var. elegans
  - Leucopogon elegans subsp. psorophyllus Hislop (WA)
- Leucopogon extremus Hislop & Puente-Lel. (WA)
- Leucopogon fasciculatus (G.Forst.) A.Rich. (New Zealand)
- Leucopogon fimbriatus Stschegl. (WA)
- Leucopogon florulentus Benth. (WA)
- Leucopogon foliosus Hislop (WA)
- Leucopogon gelidus N.A.Wakef. (NSW, ACT, Vic)
- Leucopogon gibbosus Stschegl. (WA)
- Leucopogon gilbertii Stschegl. (WA)
- Leucopogon glabellus R.Br. (WA)
- Leucopogon glacialis Lindl. (SA, Vic)
- Leucopogon gnaphalioides Stschegl. (WA)
- Leucopogon gracilis R.Br. (WA)
- Leucopogon gracillimus DC. (WA)
- Leucopogon grammatus Hislop (WA)
- Leucopogon incisus Hislop (WA)
- Leucopogon inflexus Hislop (WA)
- Leucopogon infuscatus Strid (WA)
- Leucopogon interruptus R.Br. (WA)
- Leucopogon interstans Hislop (WA)
- Leucopogon lasiophyllus Stschegl. (WA)
- Leucopogon lasiostachyus Stschegl. (WA)
- Leucopogon lloydiorum Strid (WA)
- Leucopogon maritimus Hislop (WA)
- Leucopogon melaleucoides A.Cunn. ex DC. (Qld, NSW)
- Leucopogon microcarpus Hislop (WA)
- Leucopogon microphyllus (Cav.) R.Br. (Qld, NSW, ACT, Vic)
  - Leucopogon microphyllus (Cav.) R.Br. var. microphyllus
  - Leucopogon microphyllus var. pilibundus (A.Cunn. ex DC.) Benth.
- Leucopogon mollis E.Pritz. (WA)
- Leucopogon navicularis Hislop (WA)
- Leucopogon neurophyllus F.Muell. (Vic)
- Leucopogon newbeyi Hislop (WA)
- Leucopogon nitidus Hislop (WA)
- Leucopogon obovatus (Labill.) R.Br. (WA)
  - Leucopogon obovatus (Labill.) R.Br. subsp. obovatus
  - Leucopogon obovatus subsp. revolutus (R.Br.) Hislop
- Leucopogon obtusatus Sond. (WA)
- Leucopogon oldfieldii Benth. (WA)
- Leucopogon oliganthus E.Pritz. (WA)
- Leucopogon opponens (F.Muell.) Benth. (WA)
- Leucopogon oppositifolius Sond. (WA)
- Leucopogon ozothamnoides Benth. (WA)
- Leucopogon parviflorus (Andrews) Lindl. (WA, SA, Qld, NSW, LHI, Vic, Tas, NZ)
- Leucopogon penicillatus Stschegl. (WA)
- Leucopogon phyllostachys Benth. (WA)
- Leucopogon pilifer N.A.Wakef. (NSW, Vic, Tas)
- Leucopogon pimeleoides A.Cunn. ex DC. (Qld, NSW)
- Leucopogon plumuliflorus (F.Muell.) F.Muell. ex Benth. (WA)
- Leucopogon polymorphus Sond. (WA)
- Leucopogon polystachyus R.Br. (WA)
- Leucopogon prolatus Hislop (WA)
- Leucopogon psammophilus E.Pritz. (WA)
- Leucopogon pulchellus Sond. (WA)
- Leucopogon reflexus R.Br. (WA)
- Leucopogon remotus Hislop (WA)
- Leucopogon rodwayi Summerh. (NSW)
- Leucopogon rubricaulis R.Br. (WA)
- Leucopogon rugulosus Hislop (WA)
- Leucopogon rupicola C.T.White (Qld)
- Leucopogon ruscifolius R.Br. (Qld)
- Leucopogon simulans Hislop (WA)
- Leucopogon spectabilis Hislop & A.R.Chapm. (WA)
- Leucopogon sprengelioides Sond. (WA)
- Leucopogon squarrosus Benth. (WA)
  - Leucopogon squarrosus Benth. subsp. squarrosus (WA)
  - Leucopogon squarrosus subsp. trigynus Hislop (WA)
- Leucopogon stenophyllus Hislop (WA)
- Leucopogon stokesii Hislop (WA)
- Leucopogon strictus Benth. (WA)
- Leucopogon subsejunctus Hislop (WA)
- Leucopogon tamariscinus R.Br. (WA)
- Leucopogon tenuicaulis J.M.Powell ex Hislop (WA)
- Leucopogon tenuis DC. (WA)
- Leucopogon tetragonus Sond. (WA)
- Leucopogon thymifolius Lindl. ex Benth. (Vic.)
- Leucopogon unilateralis Stschegl. (WA)
- Leucopogon validus Hislop & A.R.Chapm. (WA)
- Leucopogon verticillatus R.Br. (WA)
- Leucopogon virgatus (Labill.) R.Br. (SA, Qld, NSW, ACT, Vic, Tas)
  - Leucopogon virgatus var. brevifolius Benth. (SA, Vic, Tas)
  - Leucopogon virgatus (Labill.) R.Br. var. virgatus (SA, ACT, Vic, Tas)
- Leucopogon wheelerae Hislop (WA)
