= Leucopogon distans =

Scientific classification
- Kingdom: Plantae
- Clade: Tracheophytes
- Clade: Angiosperms
- Clade: Eudicots
- Clade: Asterids
- Order: Ericales
- Family: Ericaceae
- Genus: Leucopogon
- Species: L. distans

Binomial name
- Leucopogon distans R.Br.
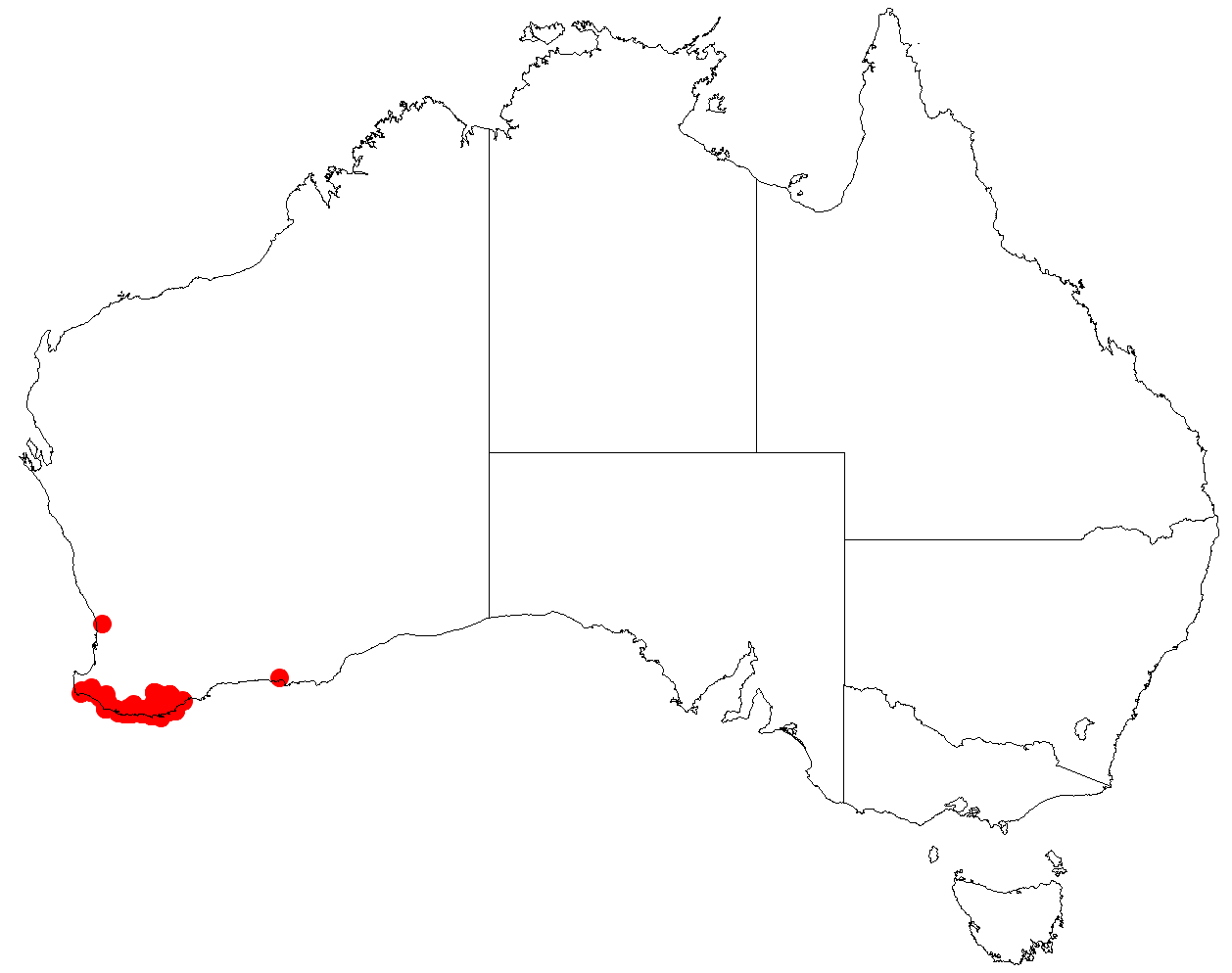
- Occurrence data from AVH

Synonyms
- Leucopogon distans R.Br. var. distans; Styphelia distans (R.Br.) Spreng.

Species of shrub

Leucopogon distans is a flowering plant in the family Ericaceae and is endemic to the south-west of Western Australia. It is an erect shrub that typically grows to a height of 0.2–1.2 m (7.9 in – 3 ft 11.2 in). The leaves are heart-shaped to egg-shaped or lance-shaped, 2–4.5 mm (0.079–0.177 in) long with the edges rolled under. The flowers are arranged in spikes on the ends of branches or in upper leaf axils, the flowers well-spaced from each other, with small bracts and broad bracteoles at the base. The sepals are about 4 mm (0.16 in) long, the petal tube about the same length as the sepals, the lobes about twice as long. Flowering occurs from July to February.

Leucopogon distans was first formally described in 1810 by Robert Brown in his Prodromus Florae Novae Hollandiae. The specific epithet (distans) means "distant", referring to the well-spaced flowers.

This leucopogon grows on sandy and gravelly soils in swamps, sandplains and hills in the Esperance Plains, Jarrah Forest and Warren bioregions of south-western Western Australia.
