= Leucopogon carinatus =

Scientific classification
- Kingdom: Plantae
- Clade: Tracheophytes
- Clade: Angiosperms
- Clade: Eudicots
- Clade: Asterids
- Order: Ericales
- Family: Ericaceae
- Genus: Leucopogon
- Species: L. carinatus

Binomial name
- Leucopogon carinatus R.Br.
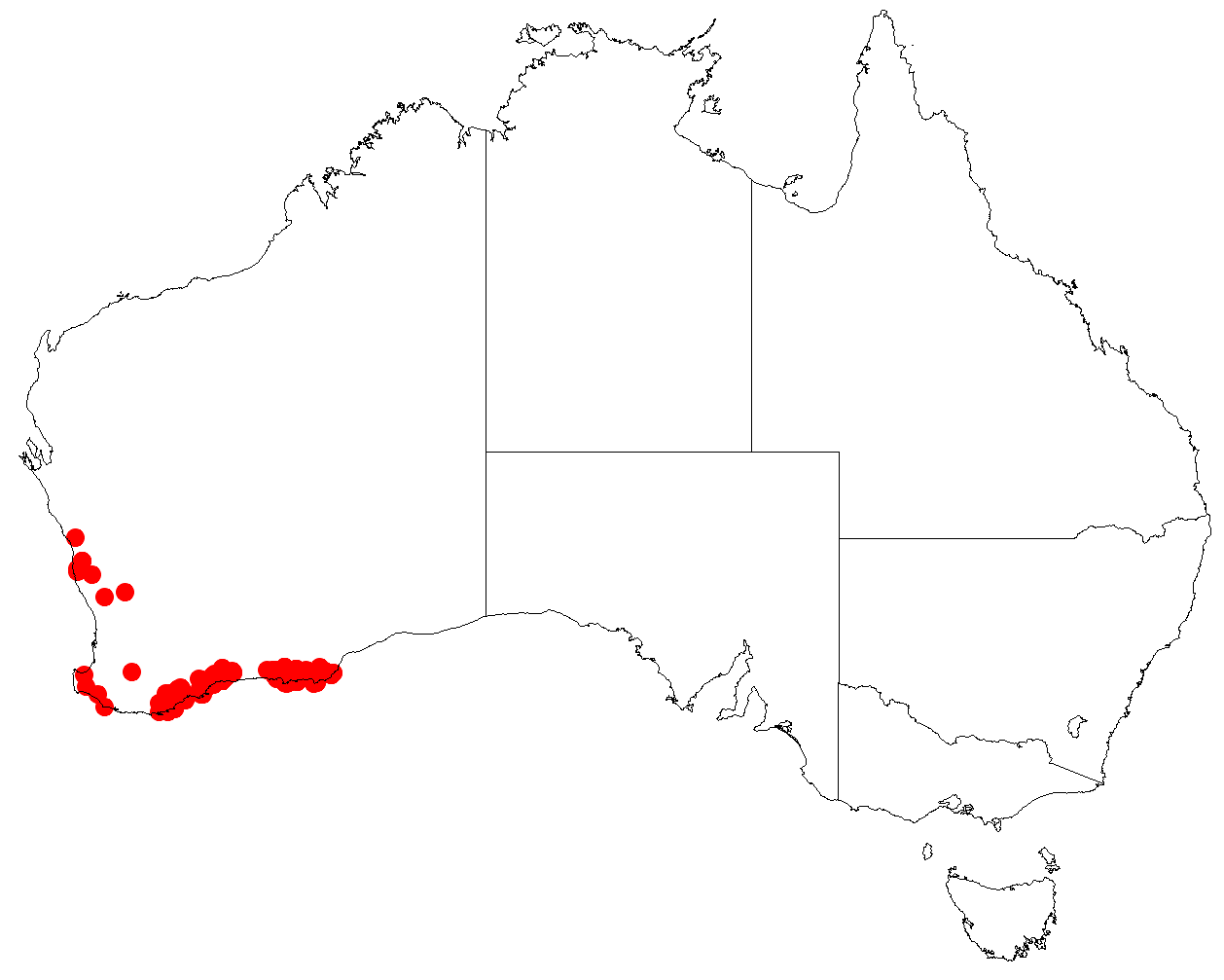
- Occurrence data from AVH

Synonyms
- Styphelia carinata (R.Br.) Spreng.; Leucopogon tectus Sond.

Species of plant

Leucopogon carinatus is a species of flowering plant in the heath family Ericaceae and is endemic to the south-west of Western Australia. It is an erect or spreading shrub that typically grows to a height of 0.15–1.2 m (5.9 in – 3 ft 11.2 in) and has many branches. Its leaves are oval to lance-shaped or almost linear and mostly 4–6.5 mm (0.16–0.26 in) long. The flowers are borne on short, dense spikes on the ends of branches or in upper leaf axils with small bracts and bracteoles about half as long as the sepals. The sepals are about 5.3 mm (0.21 in) long, rigid and pointed. The petals are white and 3–4 mm (0.12–0.16 in) long, the petal lobes longer than the petal tube. Flowering mainly occurs from July to December.

It was first formally described in 1810 by Robert Brown in his Prodromus Florae Novae Hollandiae. The specific epithet (carinatus) means "keeled", referring to the leaves.

This leucopogon grows in sandplains and on rocky slopes in the Esperance Plains, Jarrah Forest and Mallee bioregions of south-western Western Australia and is listed as "not threatened" by the Western Australian Government Department of Biodiversity, Conservation and Attractions.
