= Leucopogon florulentus =

Conservation status
- Priority Three — Poorly Known Taxa (DEC)

Scientific classification
- Kingdom: Plantae
- Clade: Tracheophytes
- Clade: Angiosperms
- Clade: Eudicots
- Clade: Asterids
- Order: Ericales
- Family: Ericaceae
- Genus: Leucopogon
- Species: L. florulentus

Binomial name
- Leucopogon florulentus Benth.
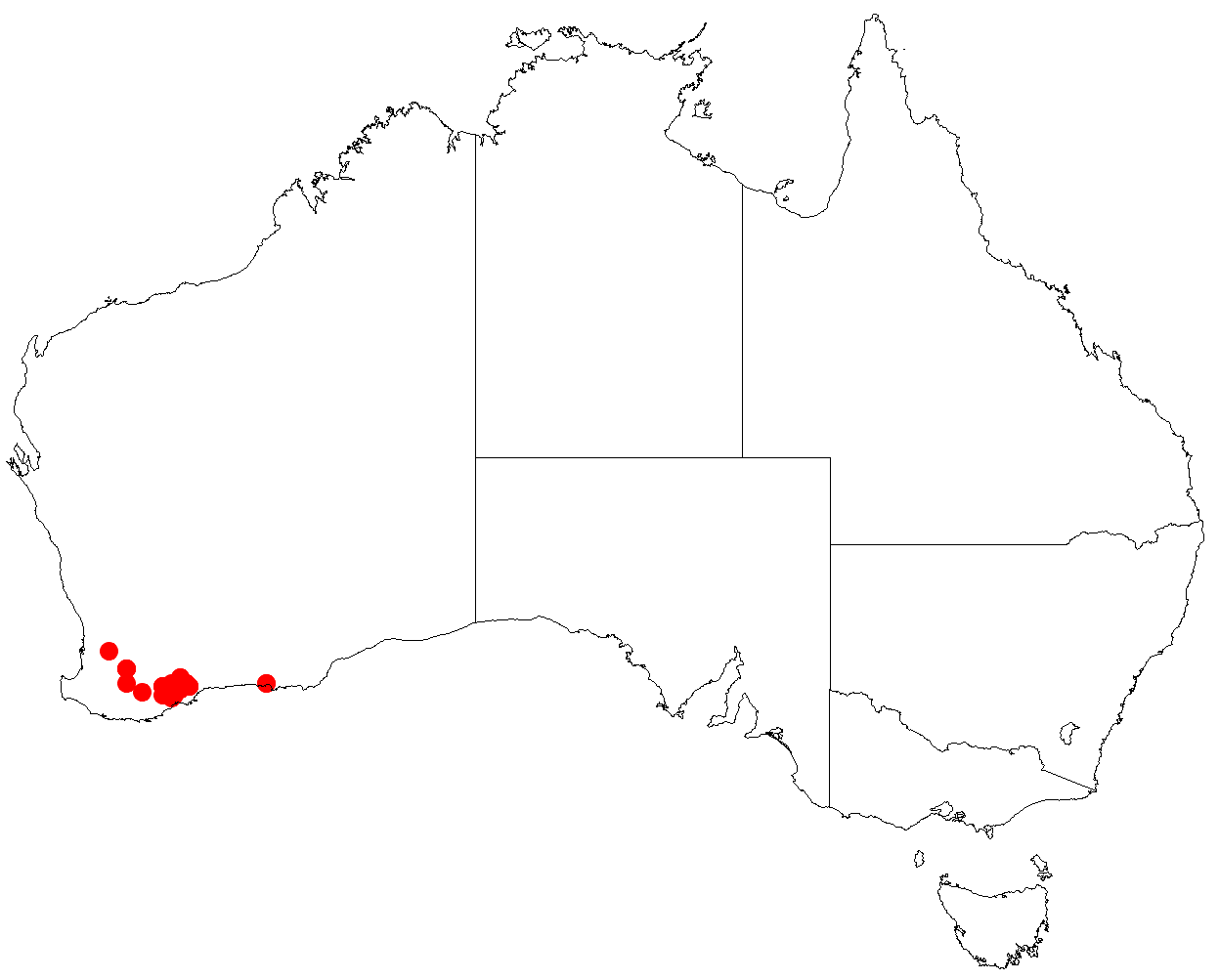
- Occurrence data from AVH

Synonyms
- Styphelia florulenta (Benth.) F.Muell.

Species of plant

Leucopogon florulentus is a species of flowering plant in the heath family Ericaceae and is endemic to the south-west of Western Australia. It is slender, erect shrub that typically grows to a height of 30–80 cm (12–31 in). Its leaves are thick, erect and egg-shaped, sometimes with the narrower end towards the base, and 2–3 mm (0.079–0.118 in) long. The flowers are densely arranged in spikes at the ends of many branchlets with egg-shaped bracts and bracteoles less than 0.8 mm (0.031 in) long at the base. The sepals are about 1.6 mm (0.063 in) long, the petals 2–3 mm (0.079–0.118 in) long and joined at the base, forming a tube, the petal lobes about as long as the petal tube.

The species was first formally described in 1868 by George Bentham in Flora Australiensis from specimens collected between King George Sound and the Swan River Colony. The specific epithet (florulentus) means "an abundance of flowers".

Leucopogon florulentus is listed as "Priority Three" by the Government of Western Australia Department of Biodiversity, Conservation and Attractions, meaning that it is poorly known and known from only a few locations but is not under imminent threat.
