= Leucopogon unilateralis =

Scientific classification
- Kingdom: Plantae
- Clade: Tracheophytes
- Clade: Angiosperms
- Clade: Eudicots
- Clade: Asterids
- Order: Ericales
- Family: Ericaceae
- Genus: Leucopogon
- Species: L. unilateralis

Binomial name
- Leucopogon unilateralis Stschegl.
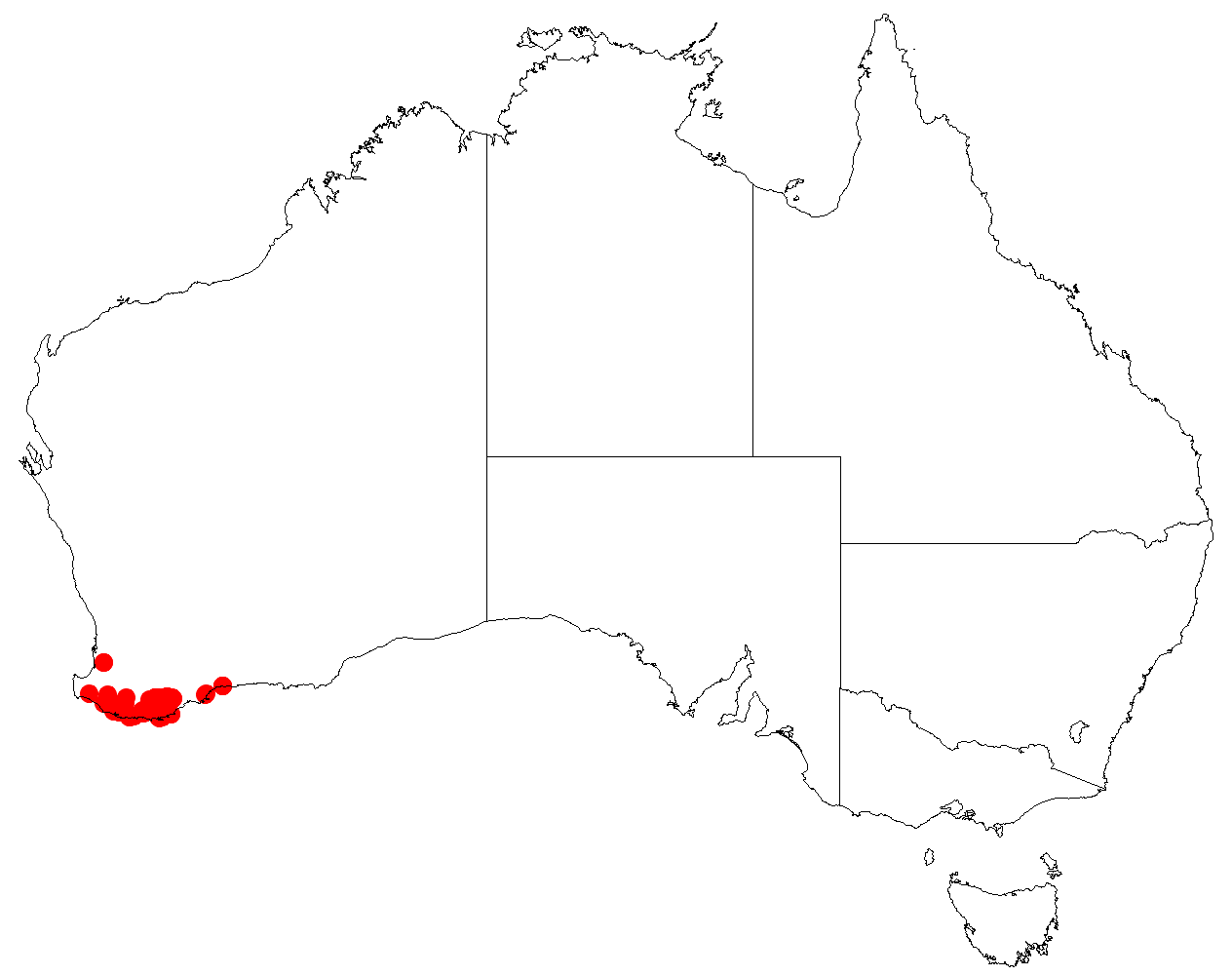
- Occurrence data from AVH

Synonyms
- Leucopogon acutiflorus Stschegl.; Leucopogon acutifolius A.D.Chapm. orth. var.; Styphelia unilateralis (Stschegl.) F.Muell.

Species of plant

Leucopogon unilateralis is a species of flowering plant in the heath family Ericaceae and is endemic to the south-west of Western Australia. It is a shrub with oblong leaves and spikes of white, tube-shaped flowers arranged in small groups on the ends of branches and in upper leaf axils.

== Description ==
Leucopogon unilateralis is an upright shrub that typically grows to a height of 0.2–1.5 m (7.9 in – 4 ft 11.1 in) and has glabrous branches. The leaves are oblong, 6–13 mm (0.24–0.51 in) long, sometimes with tiny soft hairs and sometimes with a small hard point on the tip, and has fine veins on the lower surface. The flowers are arranged in small groups in spikes or racemes on the ends of branches or in upper leaf axils. The flowers are more or less pendent and all are turned to one side of the branches on very short pedicels with small, broad bracts at the base. The bracteoles are less than half the length of the sepals, the sepals 2.1–2.6 mm (0.083–0.102 in) long. The petals are 5.3–6.3 mm (0.21–0.25 in) long and joined at the base, the petal tube longer than the sepals, and the petal lobes shorter than the tube.

== Taxonomy ==
Leucopogon unilateralis was first formally described in 1859 by Sergei Sergeyevich Sheglejev in the Bulletin de la Société impériale des naturalistes de Moscou from specimens collected by James Drummond. It is listed "not threatened" by the Western Australian Government Department of Biodiversity, Conservation and Attractions. The specific epithet (unilateralis) means "one at the side", referring to the flowers being turned to one side of the branch.

== Distribution and habitat ==
This leucopogon grows on rocky soils, granite outcrops and quartzite in winter-wet places, swamps and hills in the Esperance Plains, Jarrah Forest, Mallee bioregions in the south-west of Western Australia.

== Conservation status ==
Leucopogon unilateralis is listed as "not threatened" by the Government of Western Australia Department of Biodiversity, Conservation and Attractions.
