= Leucopogon cryptanthus =

Conservation status
- Extinct (EPBC Act)

Scientific classification
- Kingdom: Plantae
- Clade: Tracheophytes
- Clade: Angiosperms
- Clade: Eudicots
- Clade: Asterids
- Order: Ericales
- Family: Ericaceae
- Genus: Leucopogon
- Species: †L. cryptanthus

Binomial name
- †Leucopogon cryptanthus Benth.

Synonyms
- Styphelia cryptantha (Benth.) F.Muell.

Species of plant

Leucopogon cryptanthus, commonly known as small-flowered leucopogon, is a species of flowering plant in the heath family Ericaceae and is endemic to the south-west of Western Australia. It is slender, diffuse, much-branched shrub that typically grows to a height of about 15 cm (5.9 in). Its leaves are erect and linear, 2–6.5 mm (0.079–0.256 in) long, rigid and sharply pointed. The few flowers are small and inconspicuous, arranged singly, in short spikes or in clusters at the ends of branches in cymes with leaf-like bracts and bracteoles at the base. The sepals are less than 2 mm (0.079 in) long, the petals joined at the base, forming a tube shorter than the sepals, the petal lobes about as long as the petal tube.

The species was first formally described in 1868 by George Bentham in Flora Australiensis from specimens collected by James Drummond in the Swan River Colony. The specific epithet (cryptanthus) means "hidden-flowered".

Leucopogon crassiflorus is listed as extinct under the Australian Government Environment Protection and Biodiversity Conservation Act 1999.
