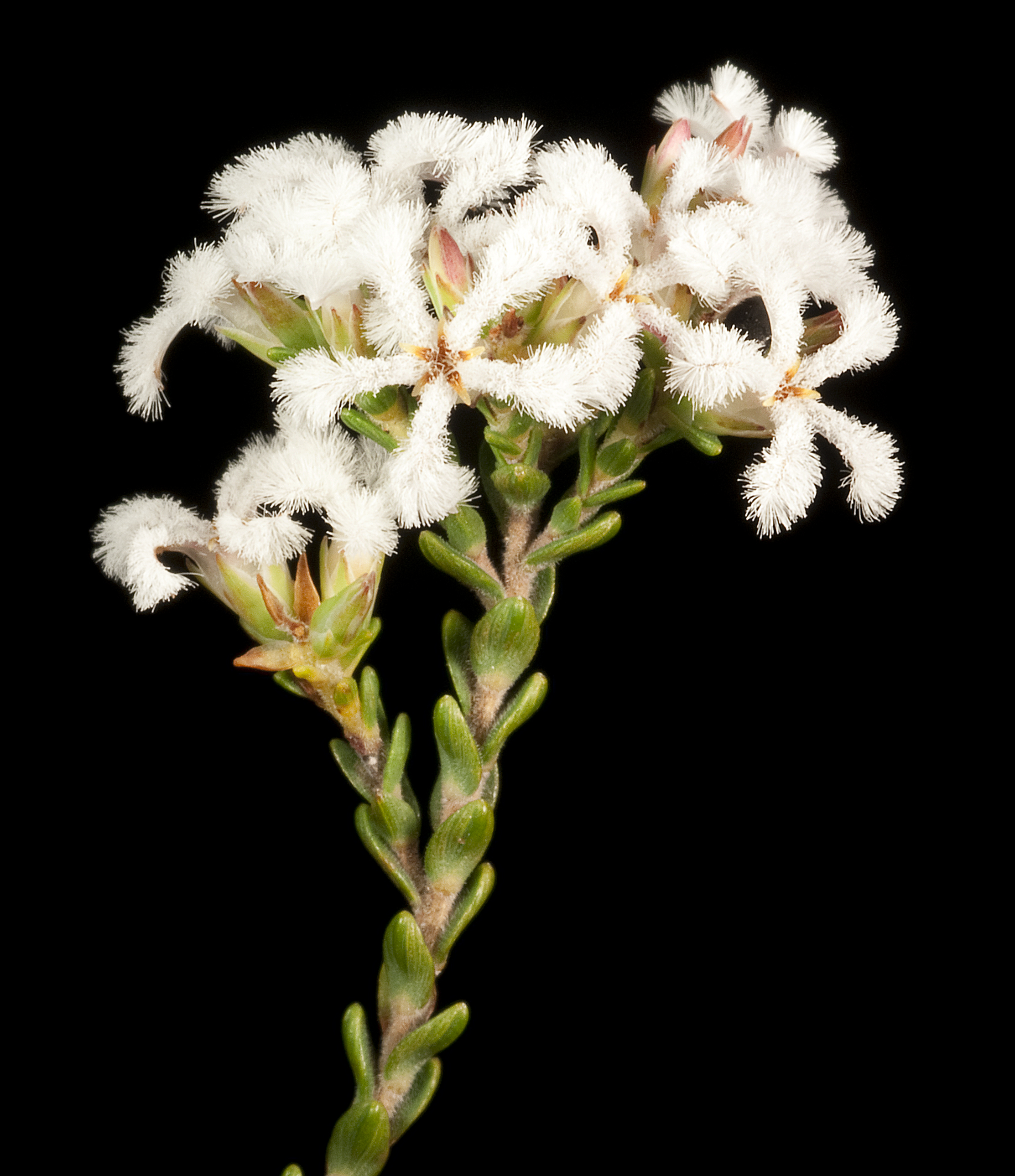

Scientific classification
- Kingdom: Plantae
- Clade: Tracheophytes
- Clade: Angiosperms
- Clade: Eudicots
- Clade: Asterids
- Order: Ericales
- Family: Ericaceae
- Genus: Leucopogon
- Species: L. oldfieldii

Binomial name
- Leucopogon oldfieldii Benth.
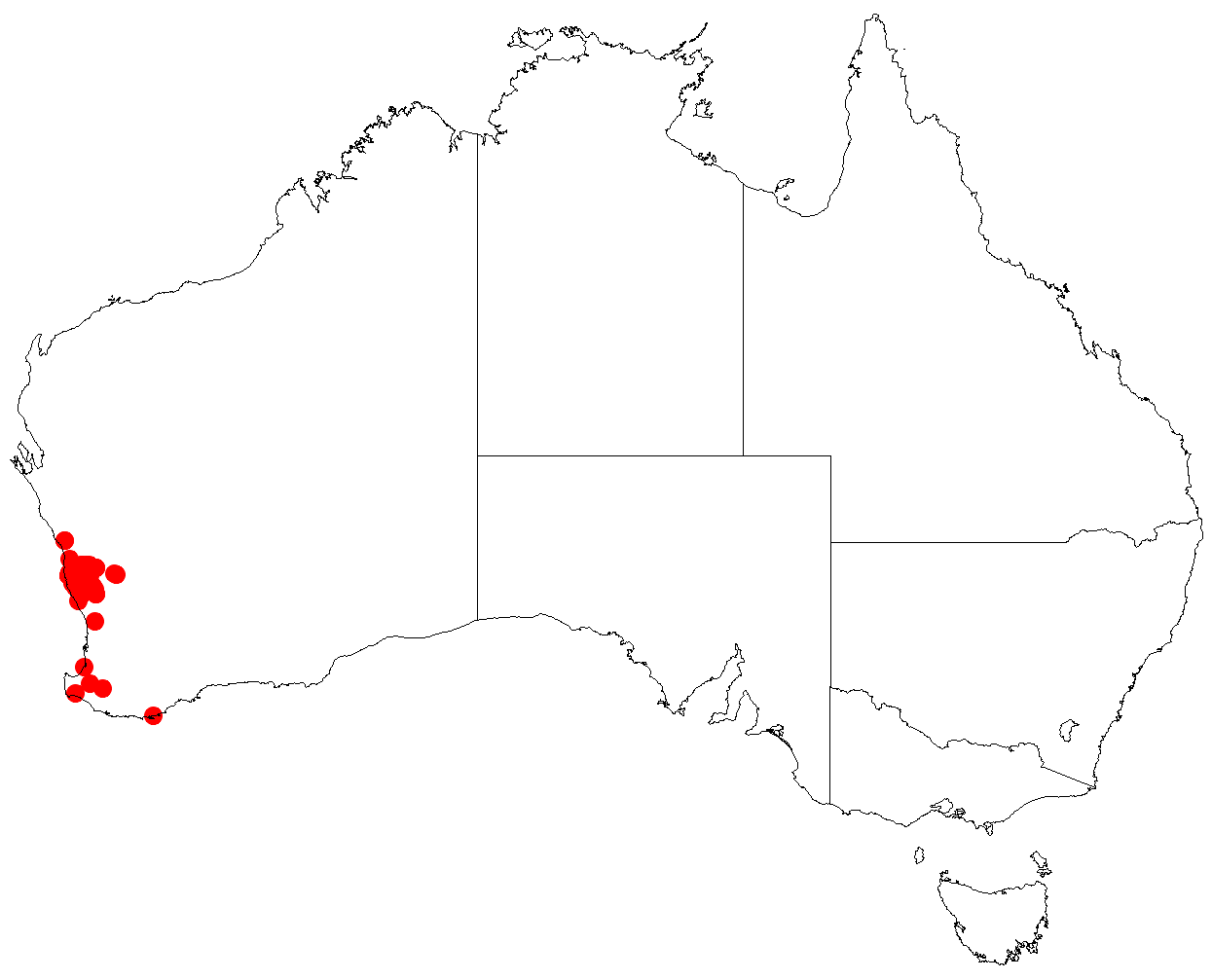
- Occurrence data from AVH

Synonyms
- Styphelia oldfieldii (Benth.) F.Muell.

= Leucopogon oldfieldii =

Species of shrub

Leucopogon oldfieldii is a species of flowering plant in the heath family Ericaceae and is endemic to the south-west of Western Australia. It is an erect or spreading shrub with lance-shaped leaves and dense spikes of white or pink, tube-shaped flowers.

== Description ==
Leucopogon oldfieldii is an erect to spreading shrub that typically grows to a height of 0.4–1 m (1 ft 4 in – 3 ft 3 in), its branches and foliage covered with soft hairs. Its leaves are erect, rigid, lance-shaped, 4–8 mm (0.16–0.31 in) long and prominently ribbed. The flowers are arranged in short, dense spikes on the ends of branches or in upper leaf axils, the lower bracts leaf-like and longer than the bracteoles. The bracteoles are tapered and about half as long as the sepals. The sepals are about 3 mm (0.12 in) long, thin and fringed with hairs. The petals are white or pinkish, about 4 mm (0.16 in) long and joined at the base to form a short tube, the lobes 2 or 3 times as long as the petal tube. Flowering occurs from June to September.

== Taxonomy ==
Leucopogon oldfieldii was first formally described in 1868 by George Bentham in Flora Australiensis from a specimen collected on the Darling Range by Augustus Frederick Oldfield. The specific epithet (oldfieldii) honours the collector of the type specimen.

== Distribution and habitat ==
This leucopogon grows in sand on sandplains in the Avon Wheatbelt, Geraldton Sandplains, Jarrah Forest and Swan Coastal Plain bioregions of south-western Western Australia.

== Conservation status ==
Leucopogon oldfieldii is listed as "not threatened" by the Government of Western Australia Department of Biodiversity, Conservation and Attractions.
