= Leucopogon cucullatus =

Scientific classification
- Kingdom: Plantae
- Clade: Tracheophytes
- Clade: Angiosperms
- Clade: Eudicots
- Clade: Asterids
- Order: Ericales
- Family: Ericaceae
- Genus: Leucopogon
- Species: L. cucullatus

Binomial name
- Leucopogon cucullatus R.Br.
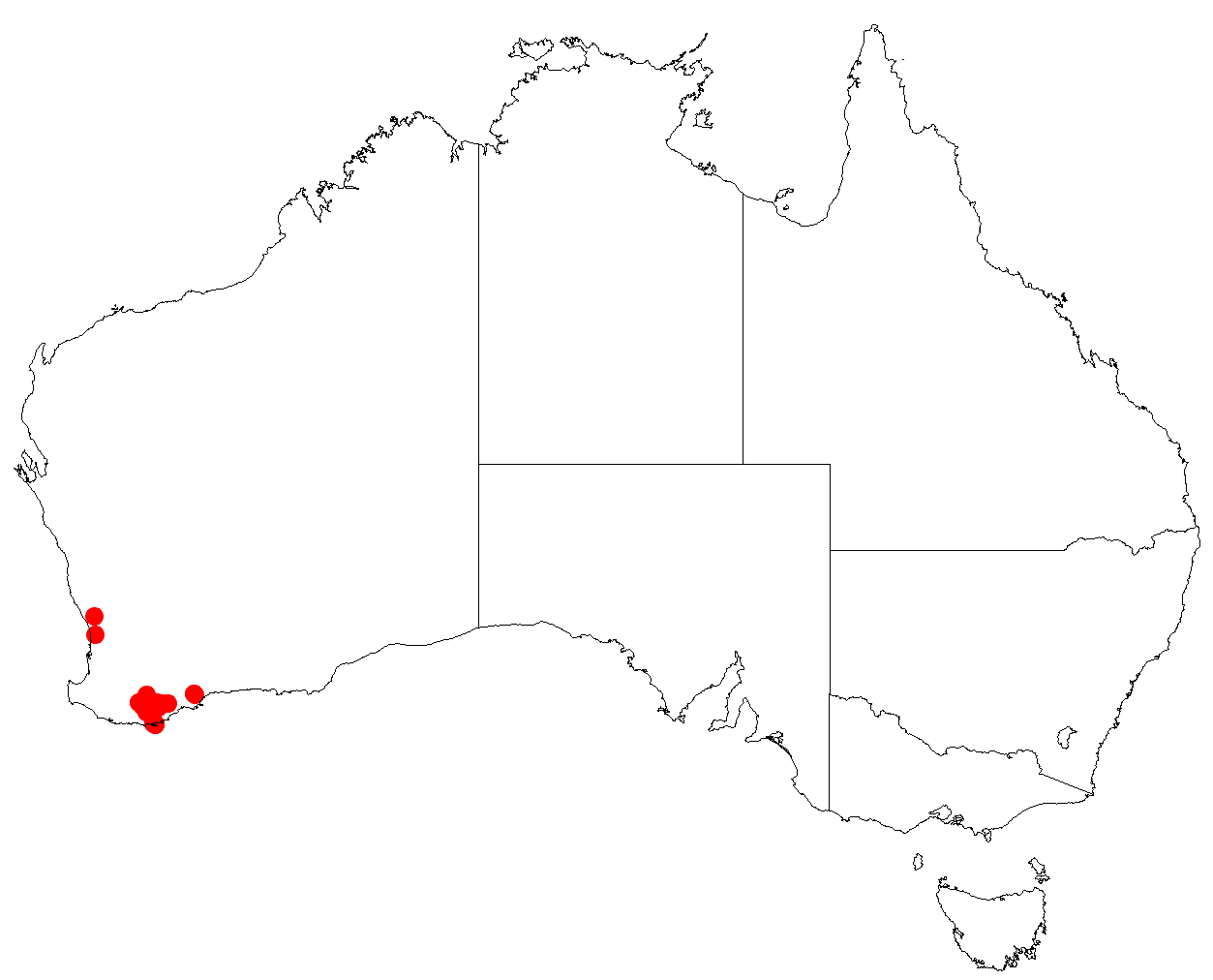
- Occurrence data from AVH

Synonyms
- Leucopogon brachycephalus DC.; Leucopogon brachycephalus DC. var. brachycephalus 3–4 mm (0.12–0.16 in) long; Styphelia brachycephala (DC.) F.Muell.; Styphelia cucullata (R.Br.) Spreng.

Species of shrub

Leucopogon cucullatus is a flowering plant in the family Ericaceae and is endemic to the south-west of Western Australia. It is an erect shrub that typically grows to a height of 0.3–1 m (1 ft 0 in – 3 ft 3 in). The leaves are crowded, egg-shaped to more or less round, and 4.0–8.5 mm (0.16–0.33 in) long. The flowers are arranged in small groups in short, dense spikes on the ends of branches or in upper leaf axils, with leaf-like bracts and bracteoles about 4 mm (0.16 in) long at the base. The sepals are 3–4 mm (0.12–0.16 in) long and the petals almost 6 mm (0.24 in) long, the lobes longer than the petal tube. Flowering occurs from July to January.

Leucopogon cucullatus was first formally described in 1810 by Robert Brown in his Prodromus Florae Novae Hollandiae. The specific epithet (cucullatus) means "hooded", referring to the leaves.

This leucopogon grows on sandy and gravelly soils in the Avon Wheatbelt, Esperance Plains, Jarrah Forest and Warren bioregions of south-western Western Australia.
