= Leucopogon alternifolius =

Conservation status
- Priority Three — Poorly Known Taxa (DEC)

Scientific classification
- Kingdom: Plantae
- Clade: Tracheophytes
- Clade: Angiosperms
- Clade: Eudicots
- Clade: Asterids
- Order: Ericales
- Family: Ericaceae
- Genus: Leucopogon
- Species: L. alternifolius

Binomial name
- Leucopogon alternifolius R.Br.
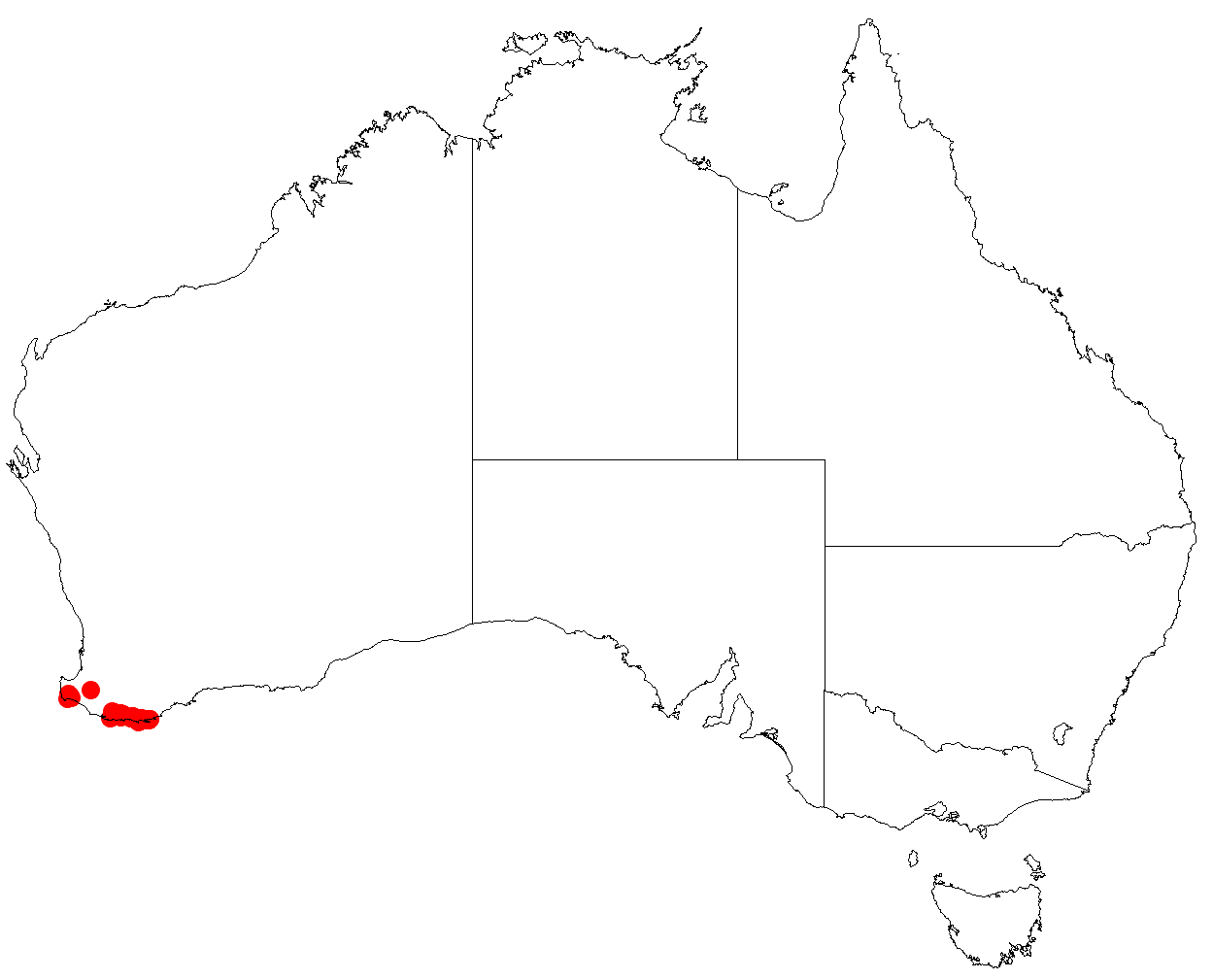
- Occurrence data from AVH

Synonyms
- Styphelia alternifolia (R.Br.) Spreng.

Species of plant

Leucopogon alternifolius is a species of flowering plant in the heath family Ericaceae and is endemic to south of Western Australia. It is a low, sprawling shrub with thin branchlets, egg-shaped leaves with a heart-shaped, stem-clasping base, and white or pale pink flowers arranged in up to twenty groups along the flowering branchlets.

== Description ==
Leucopogon alternifolius is a sprawling shrub that typically grows to 40 cm (16 in) high and wide, with a single stem at the base, its young branchlets thin and glabrous. The leaves are egg-shaped, 2.3–6.1 mm (0.091–0.240 in) long and 1.8–5.2 mm (0.071–0.205 in) wide on a petiole up to 0.3 mm (0.012 in) long. The leaves are usually concave, the base heart-shaped and stem-clasping and the lower surface a paler shade of green. The flowers are arranged in groups of three to eleven at the ends of branchlets, or in up to twenty leaf axils along flowering branchlets, with egg-shaped bracts 0.7–0.9 mm (0.028–0.035 in) long and slightly shorter bracteoles. The sepals are egg-shaped, 1.0–1.5 mm (0.039–0.059 in) long and often tinged with purple. The petals are joined at the base to form a bell-shaped tube shorter than the sepals, the lobes white or pale pink and 1.0–1.4 mm (0.039–0.055 in) long. Flowering occurs from August to December and the fruit is a flattened, more or less circular drupe 0.9–1.2 mm (0.035–0.047 in) long.

== Taxonomy and naming ==
Leucopogon alternifolius was first formally described in 1810 by Robert Brown in his Prodromus Florae Novae Hollandiae. The specific epithet (alternifolius) means "alternate-leaved".

== Distribution and habitat ==
This leucopogon mainly grows in heath sometimes woodland, near swamps between Albany and Walole in the Jarrah Forest and Warren biogeographic regions of southern Western Australia.

== Conservation status ==
Leucopogon alternifolius is classified as "Priority Three" by the Government of Western Australia Department of Biodiversity, Conservation and Attractions, meaning that it is poorly known and known from only a few locations but is not under imminent threat.
