= Leucopogon interruptus =

Scientific classification
- Kingdom: Plantae
- Clade: Tracheophytes
- Clade: Angiosperms
- Clade: Eudicots
- Clade: Asterids
- Order: Ericales
- Family: Ericaceae
- Genus: Leucopogon
- Species: L. interruptus

Binomial name
- Leucopogon interruptus R.Br.
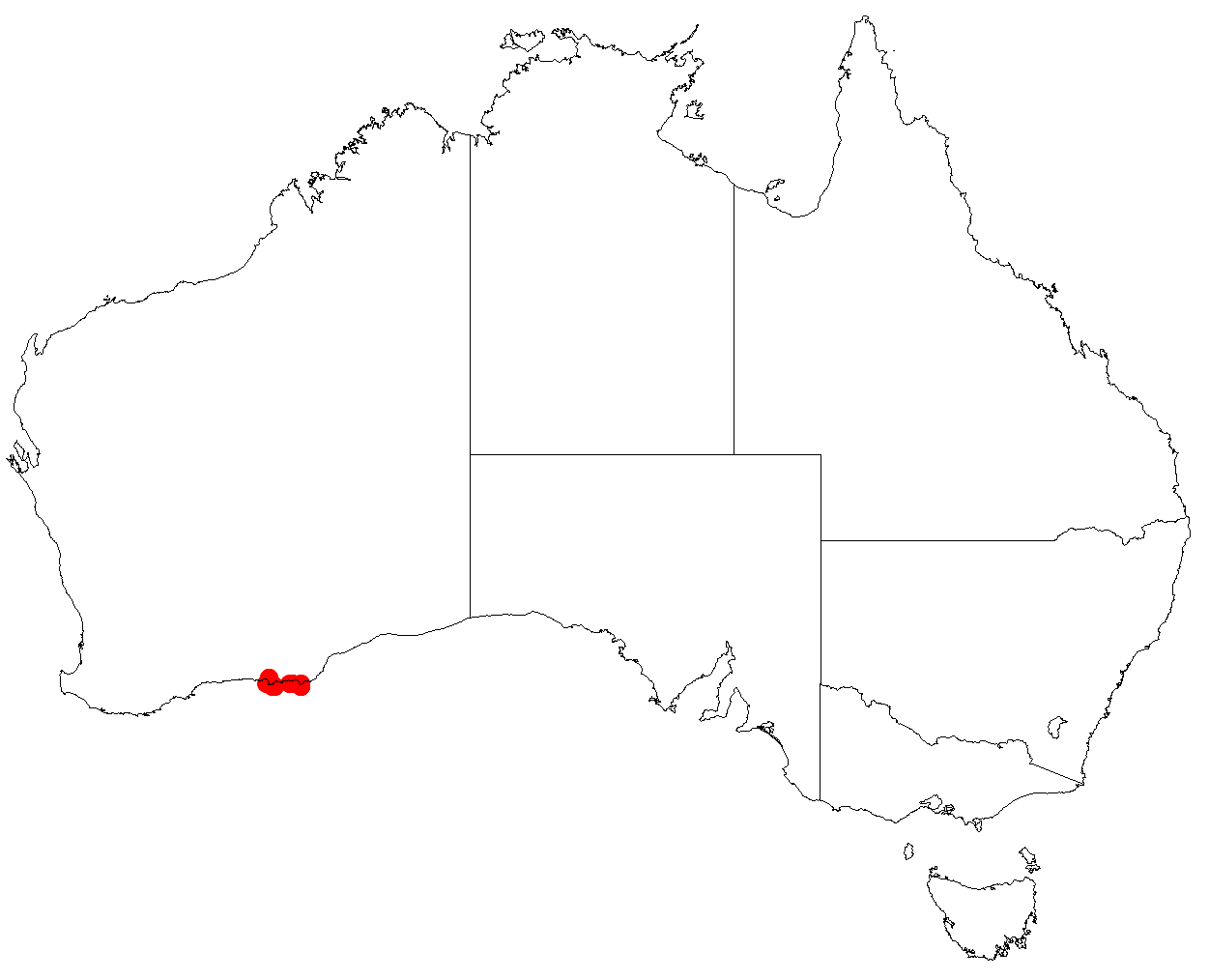
- Occurrence data from AVH

Synonyms
- Styphelia interrupta (R.Br.) Spreng.

Species of shrub

Leucopogon interruptus is a species of flowering plant in the family Ericaceae and is endemic to the southwest of Western Australia. It is a spreading, glabrous shrub with oval to oblong leaves crowded at the ends of branches, and many small, white, tube-shaped flowers that are bearded inside.

== Description ==
Leucopogon interruptus is a spreading shrub that typically grows to a height of up to 2 m (6 ft 7 in) and has erect branches. Its leaves are sessile, egg-shaped with the narrower end towards the base and less than 13 mm (0.51 in) long. The leaves are mostly crowded at the ends of each year's growth, and are oval to oblong, mostly 0.9–2.5 mm (0.035–0.098 in) long with a fine, sharp point on the rounded tip. The flowers are arranged in interrupted spikes on the ends of branches with broad bracts and bracteoles less than half as long as the sepals. The sepals are less than 2 mm (0.079 in) long and the petals white, forming a tube shorter than the sepals, with bearded lobes about as long as the petal tube.

== Taxonomy ==
Leucopogon interruptus was first formally described in 1810 by Robert Brown in his Prodromus Florae Novae Hollandiae et Insulae Van Diemen. The specific epithet (interruptus) means "separated", referring to gaps in the flower spikes.

== Distribution ==
This leucopogon grows in grey sand over granite in the Esperance Plains bioregion of south-western Western Australia.
