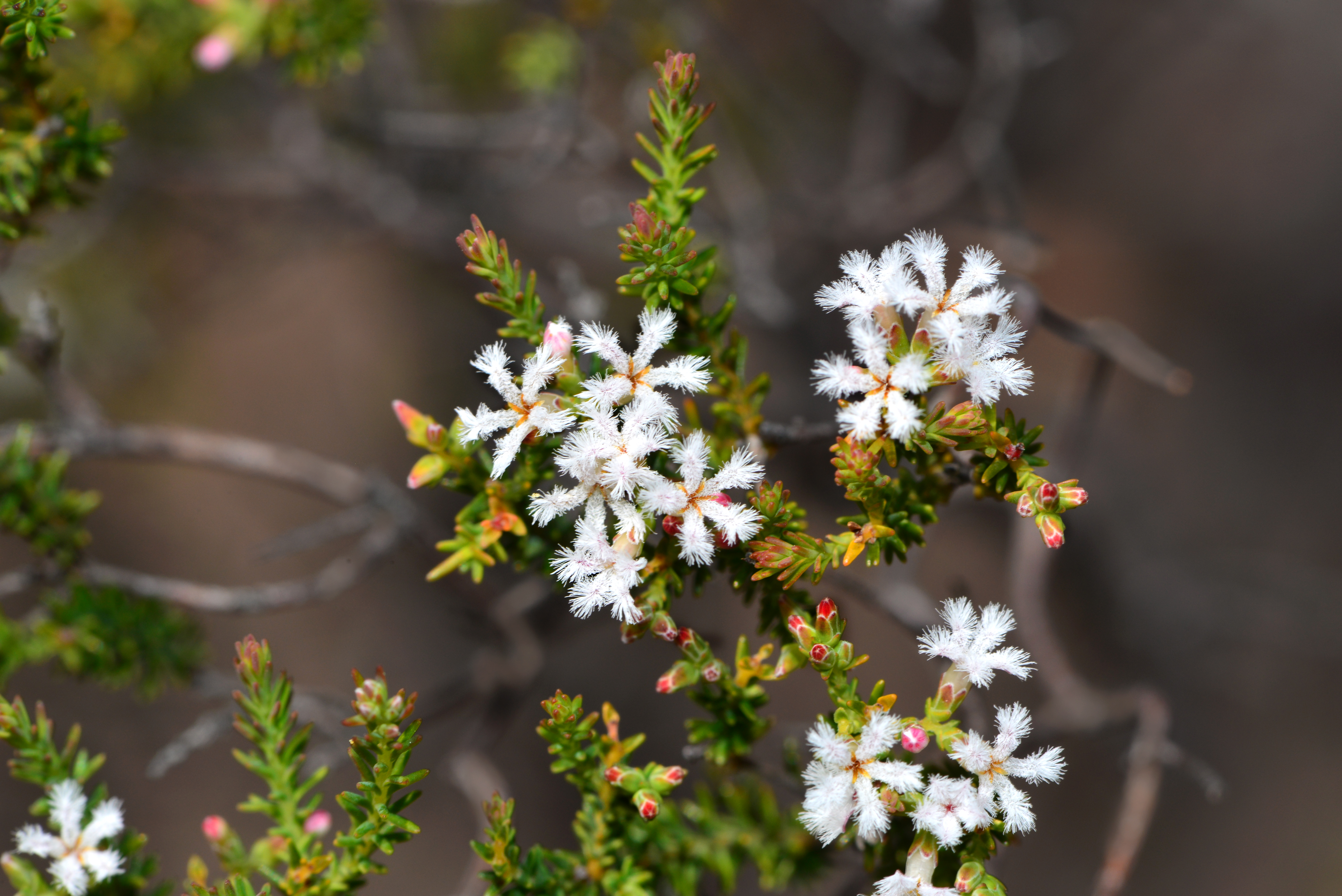

Scientific classification
- Kingdom: Plantae
- Clade: Tracheophytes
- Clade: Angiosperms
- Clade: Eudicots
- Clade: Asterids
- Order: Ericales
- Family: Ericaceae
- Genus: Leucopogon
- Species: L. gracillimus

Binomial name
- Leucopogon gracillimus DC.
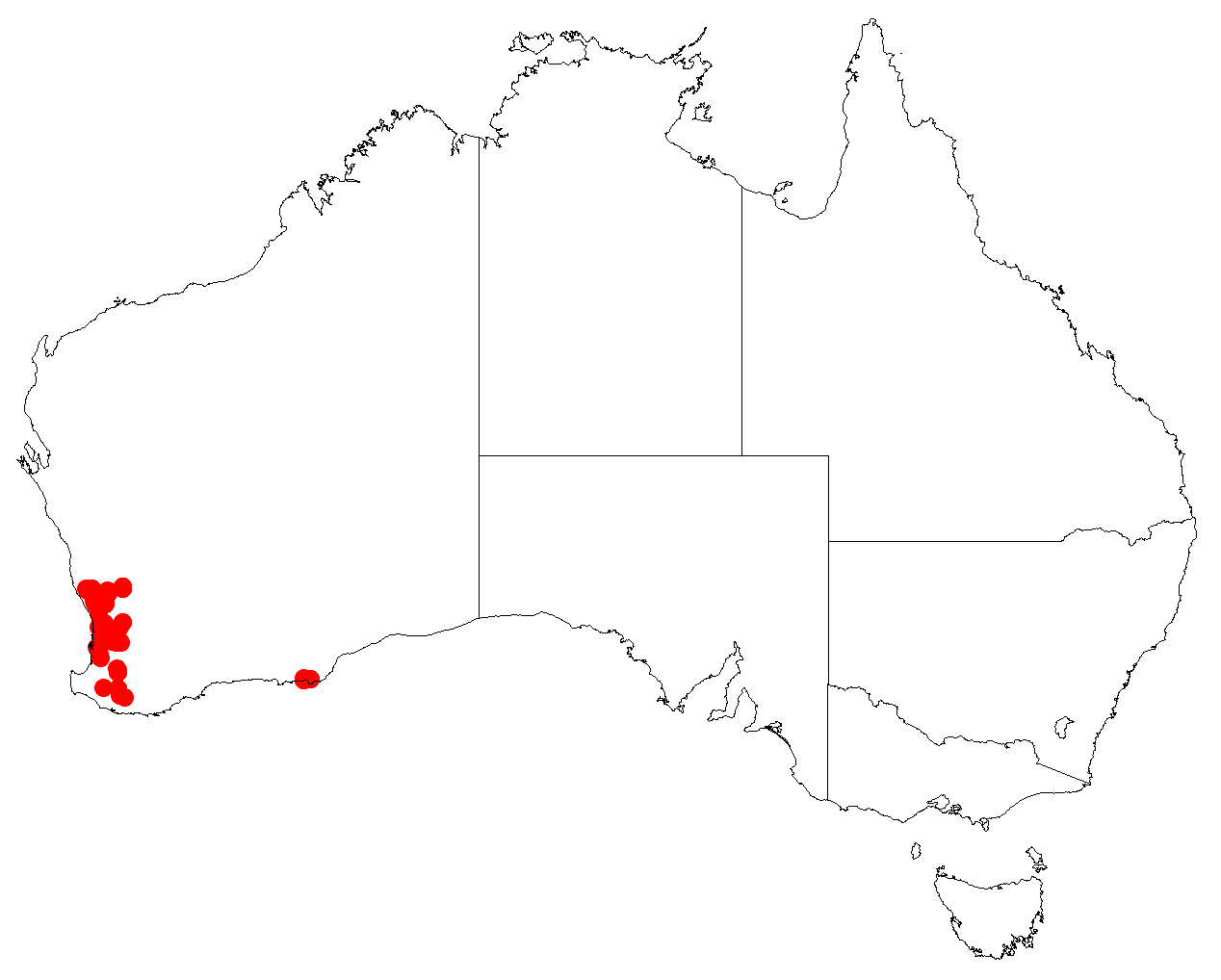
- Occurrence data from AVH

Synonyms
- Styphelia gracillima (DC.) F.Muell.

= Leucopogon gracillimus =

Species of plant

Leucopogon gracillimus is a shrub in the family Ericaceae. It is native to Western Australia.

== Description ==
Leucopogon gracillimus is an erect slender shrub, growing to heights of from 0.2 m to 1.5 m high. Its white flowers are seen from May to September.

== Distribution and habitat ==
It is found in the IBRA Regions of: Geraldton Sandplains, Jarrah Forest, and the Swan Coastal Plain, growing on sandy and gravelly soils, on plains, low ridges, seasonally wet flats, and outcrops.

== Taxonomy ==
It was first described in 1839 by Augustin Pyramus de Candolle. The specific epithet, gracillimus, derives from the Latin adjective, gracilis ("slender") and describes the plant as being very slender.
