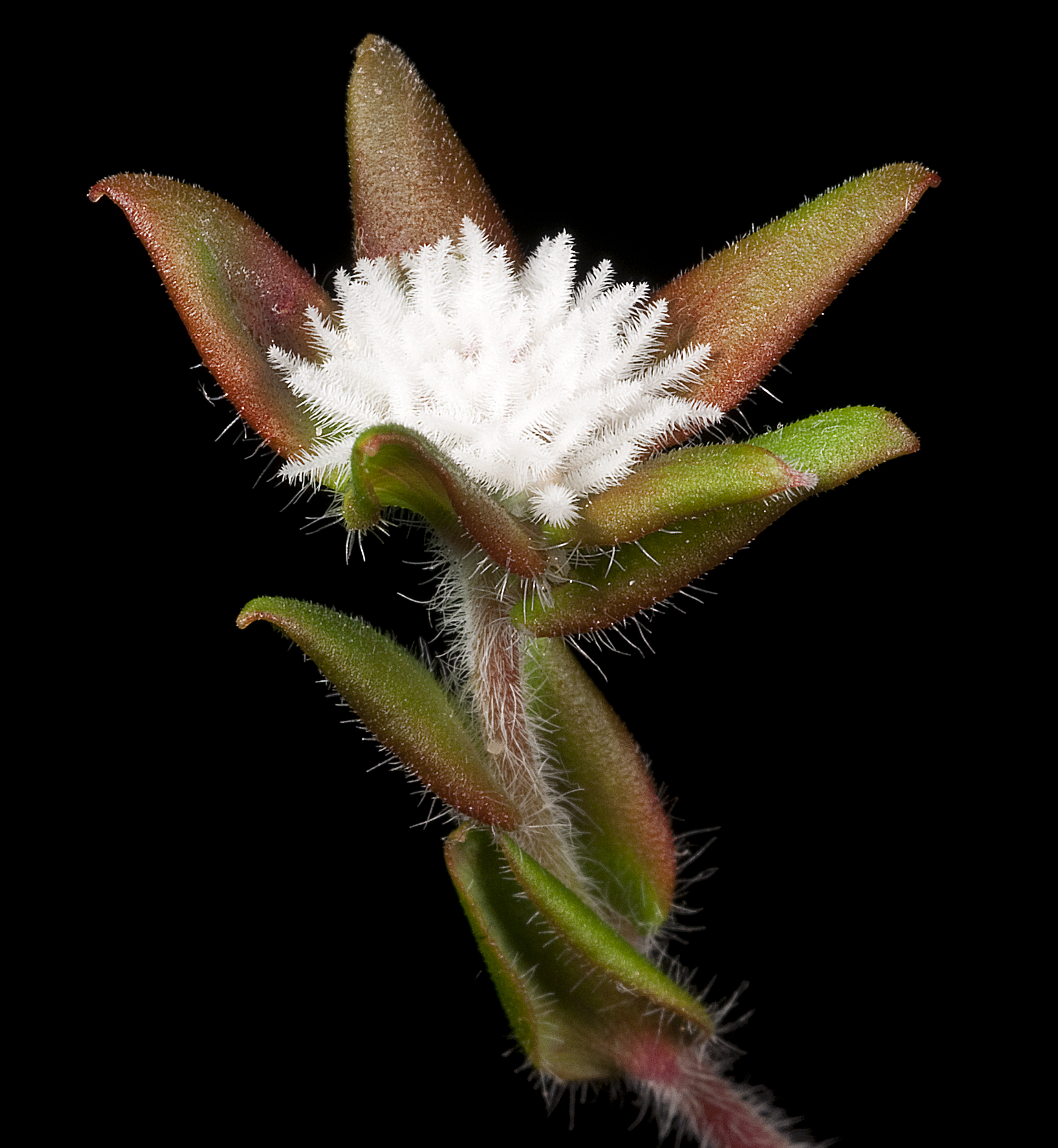

Conservation status
- Priority Two — Poorly Known Taxa (DEC)

Scientific classification
- Kingdom: Plantae
- Clade: Tracheophytes
- Clade: Angiosperms
- Clade: Eudicots
- Clade: Asterids
- Order: Ericales
- Family: Ericaceae
- Genus: Leucopogon
- Species: L. plumuliflorus

Binomial name
- Leucopogon plumuliflorus (F.Muell.) F.Muell. ex Benth.
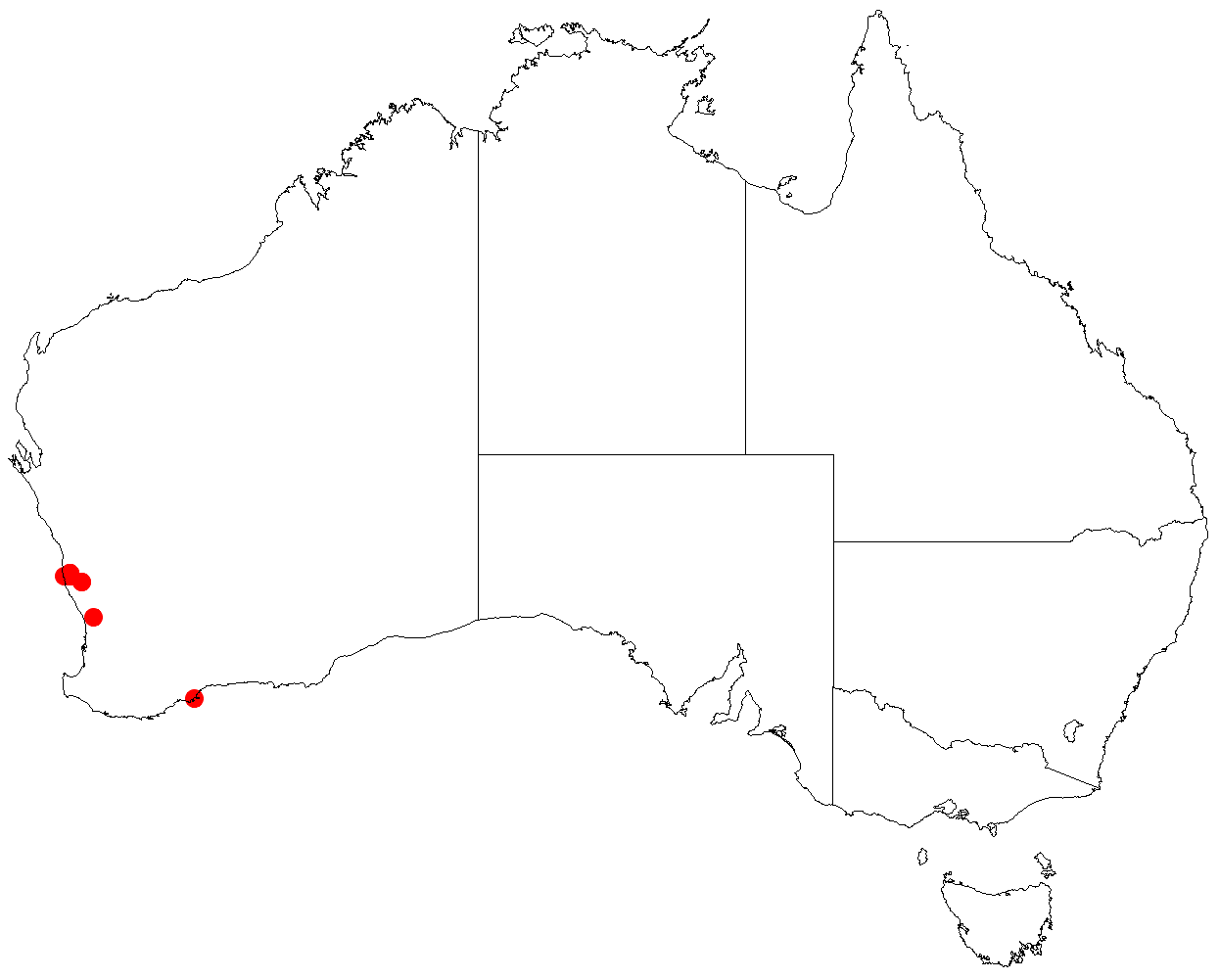
- Occurrence data from AVH

Synonyms
- Leucopogon plumuliflorus F.Muell. nom. inval., pro syn.; Styphelia plumuliflora F.Muell.

= Leucopogon plumuliflorus =

Species of plant

Leucopogon plumuliflorus is a species of flowering plant in the heath family Ericaceae and is endemic to the south-west of Western Australia. It is a weakly erect shrub with egg-shaped leaves and spikes of white or pinkish-white, tube-shaped flowers.

== Description ==
Leucopogon plumuliflorus is a slender, weakly erect, multi-stemmed shrub that typically grows to a height of 30–60 cm (12–24 in), its branches and leaves more or less softly-hairy. The leaves are egg-shaped with a heart-shaped base, less than 13 mm (0.51 in) long and convex, with the edges turned down. The flowers are arranged in spike-like heads on the ends of branches, with small bracts and hairy, egg-shaped bracteoles 1.6 mm (0.063 in) long. The sepals are linear to lance-shaped, 5.3 mm (0.21 in) long, the petals white or pinkish-white, 3.2 mm (0.13 in) and joined at the base, the petal lobes shorter than the petal tube. Flowering occurs from April or from July to November and the fruit is a drupe.

== Taxonomy ==
Leucopogon plumuliflorus was first formally described in 1867 by Ferdinand von Mueller who gave it the name Styphelia plumuliflora in Fragmenta Phytographiae Australiae from specimens collected by James Drummond. In 1868, George Bentham transferred the species to Leucopogon as L. pumuliflorus in Flora Australiensis. The specific epithet (plumuliflorus) means "little feather-flowered", referring to the sepals.

== Distribution and habitat ==
This leucopogon grows on lateritic sandy soils, amongst boulders and on hillslopes in the Geraldton Sandplains bioregion of south-western Western Australia.

== Conservation status ==
Leucopogon plumuliflorus is listed as "Priority Two" by the Western Australian Government Department of Biodiversity, Conservation and Attractions, meaning that it is poorly known and from only one or a few locations.
