= Leucopogon bracteolaris =

Conservation status
- Priority Two — Poorly Known Taxa (DEC)

Scientific classification
- Kingdom: Plantae
- Clade: Tracheophytes
- Clade: Angiosperms
- Clade: Eudicots
- Clade: Asterids
- Order: Ericales
- Family: Ericaceae
- Genus: Leucopogon
- Species: L. bracteolaris

Binomial name
- Leucopogon bracteolaris Benth.
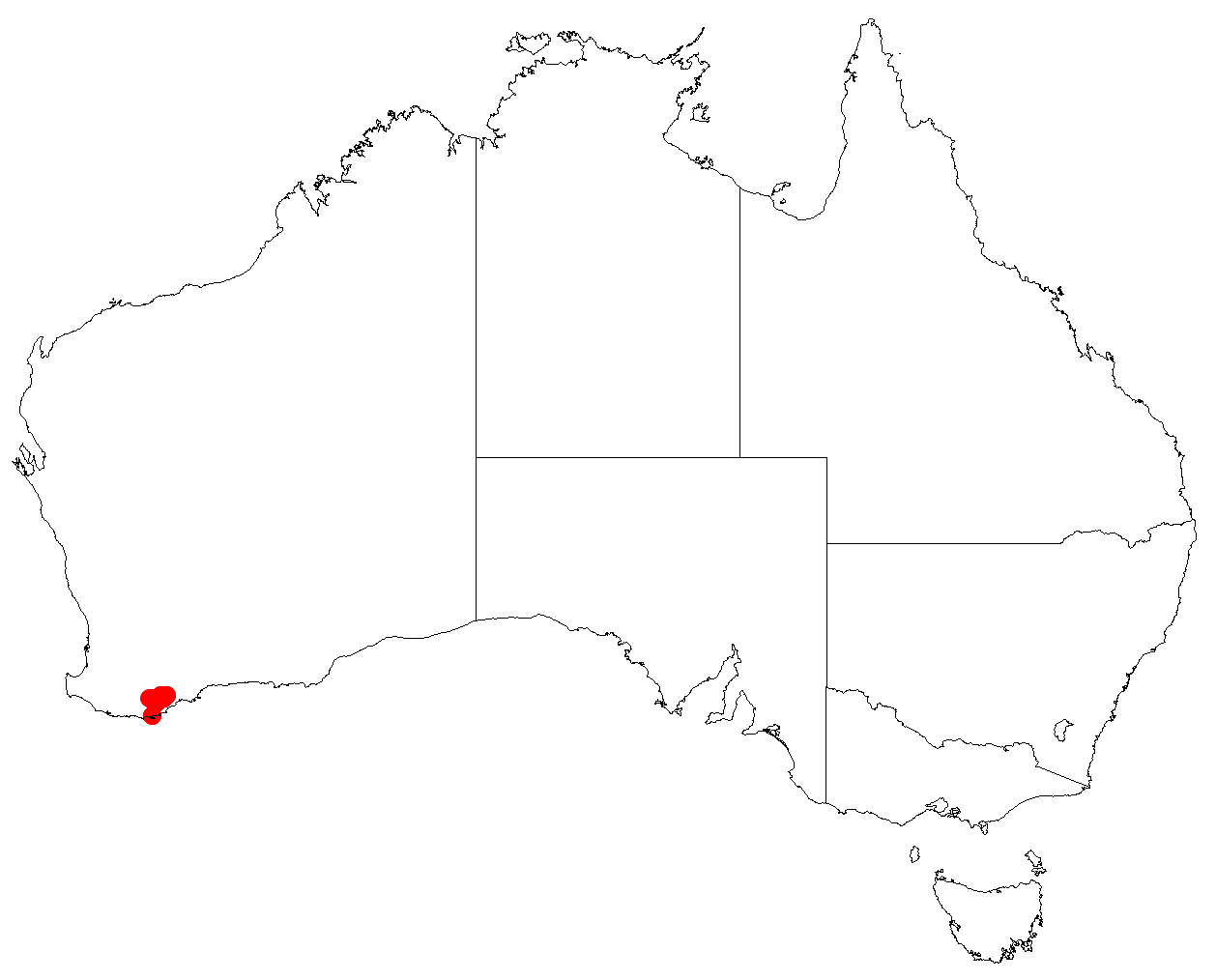
- Occurrence data from AVH

Synonyms
- Styphelia bracteolaris (Benth.) F.Muell.

Species of plant

Leucopogon bracteolaris is a species of flowering plant in the heath family Ericaceae and is endemic to the south-west of Western Australia. It is an erect shrub with egg-shaped to broadly lance-shaped leaves with the narrower end towards the base, about 4 mm (0.16 in) long. The leaves sometimes have a stem-clasping base, and are covered with fine hairs. The flowers are arranged in large, cylindrical spikes on the ends of branches with leaf-like, lance-shaped bracts and bracteoles almost as long as the sepals. The sepals are about 2 mm (0.079 in) long and lance-shaped, the petal tube is slightly longer than the sepals, and the petal lobes are longer than the petal tube.

It was first formally described in 1868 by George Bentham in Flora Australiensis. The specific epithet (bracteolaris) means "having bracteoles".

This leucopogon occurs in the Esperance plains and Jarrah Forest bioregions of the south-west of Western Australia and is listed as "Priority Two" by the Western Australian Government Department of Biodiversity, Conservation and Attractions, meaning that it is poorly known and from only one or a few locations.
