= Leucopogon tenuis =

Scientific classification
- Kingdom: Plantae
- Clade: Tracheophytes
- Clade: Angiosperms
- Clade: Eudicots
- Clade: Asterids
- Order: Ericales
- Family: Ericaceae
- Genus: Leucopogon
- Species: L. tenuis

Binomial name
- Leucopogon tenuis DC.
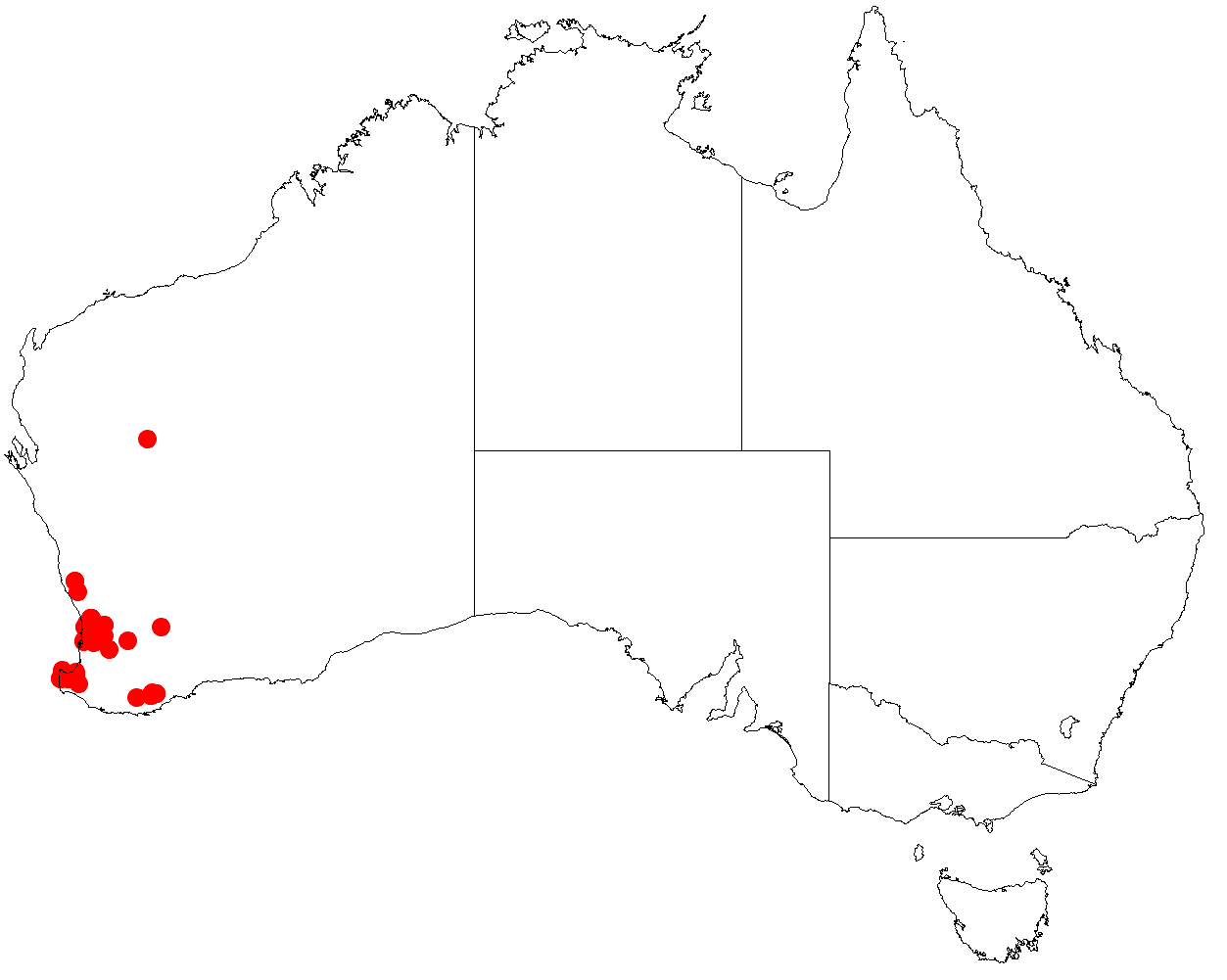
- Occurrence data from AVH

Synonyms
- Styphelia tenuis (DC.) F.Muell.

Species of shrub

Leucopogon tenuis is a species of flowering plant in the heath family Ericaceae and is endemic to the southwest of Western Australia. It is an erect shrub with slender, wand-like branches, linear or narrowly lance-shaped leaves and white, tube-shaped flowers arranged in cylindrical spikes on the ends of branches.

== Description ==
Leucopogon tenuis is an erect, glabrous shrub that typically grows to a height of 25–70 cm (9.8–27.6 in) and has slender, wand-like branches. Its leaves are linear to narrowly lance-shaped, less than 12 mm (0.47 in) long on a short petiole. The flowers are arranged in cylindrical, many-flowered spikes on the ends of branches with lance-shaped, leaf-like bracts and bracteoles less than half as long as the sepals. The sepals are about 2.6 mm (0.10 in) long, narrow and pointed, and the petals white and joined at the base, forming a tube but with lobes that are much longer than the petal tube. Flowering occurs from March or June to November.

== Taxonomy ==
Leucopogon tenuis was first formally described in 1839 by Augustin Pyramus de Candolle in his Prodromus Systematis Naturalis Regni Vegetabilis from specimens collected by James Drummond in the Swan River Colony. The specific epithet (tenuis) means "thin" or "delicate".

== Distribution and habitat ==
This leucopogon grows on ridges, in swamps and on flats in the Jarrah Forest, Swan Coastal Plain and Warren bioregions in the south-west of Western Australia.

== Conservation status ==
Leucopogon tenuis is listed as "not threatened" by the Western Australian Government Department of Biodiversity, Conservation and Attractions.
