= Leucopogon fimbriatus =

Scientific classification
- Kingdom: Plantae
- Clade: Tracheophytes
- Clade: Angiosperms
- Clade: Eudicots
- Clade: Asterids
- Order: Ericales
- Family: Ericaceae
- Genus: Leucopogon
- Species: L. fimbriatus

Binomial name
- Leucopogon fimbriatus Stschegl.
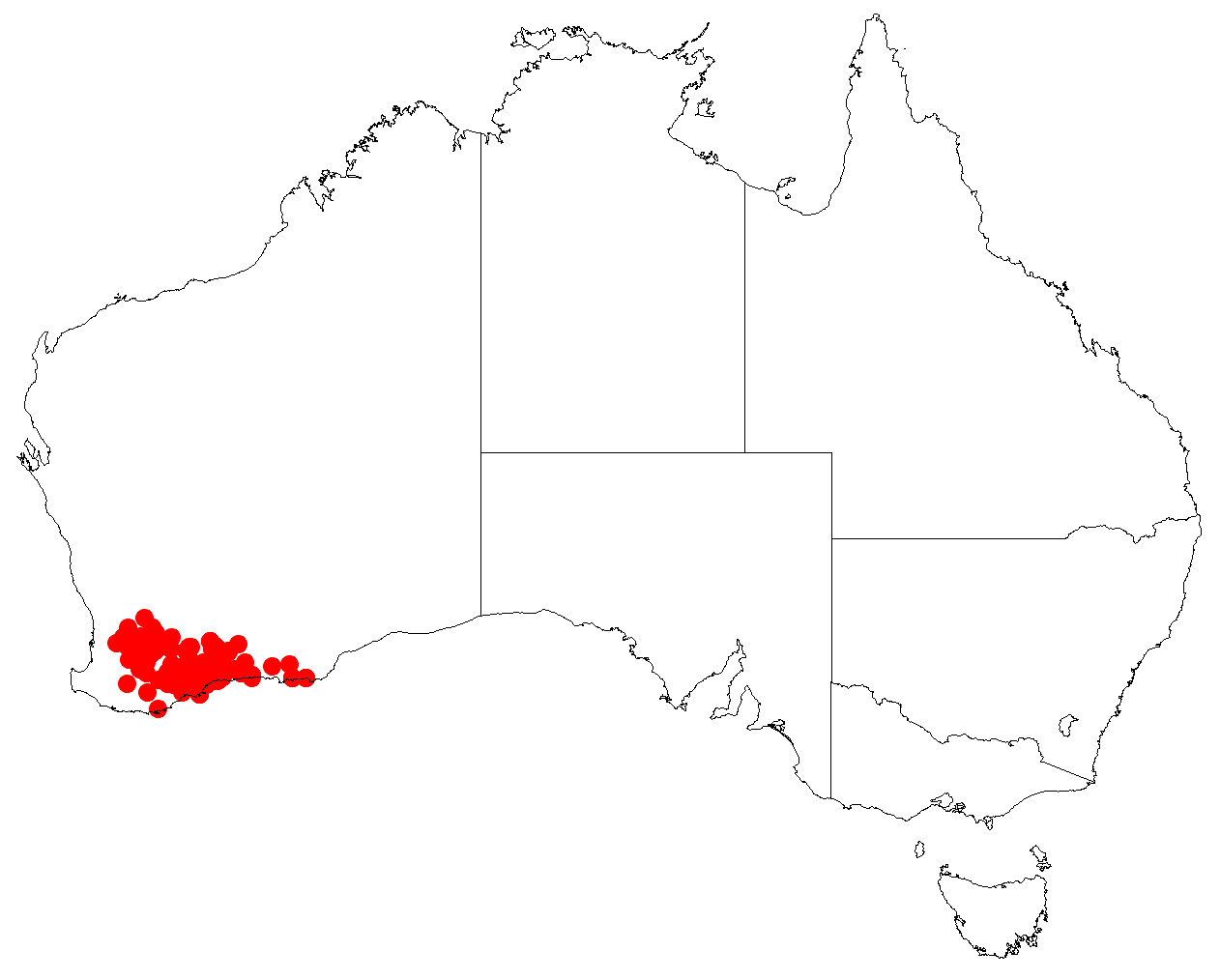
- Occurrence data from AVH

Synonyms
- Styphelia fimbriata (Stschegl.) F.Muell.; Styphelia brachycephala auct. non (DC.) F.Muell.: Mueller, F.J.H. von (1867), Fragmenta Phytographiae Australiae

Species of plant

Leucopogon fimbriatus is a species of flowering plant in the heath family Ericaceae and is endemic to the south-west of Western Australia. It is a bushy, erect or sprawling shrub with overlapping egg-shaped or oblong leaves and spikes of tube-shaped white flowers on the ends of branches.

== Description ==
Leucopogon fimbriatus is a bushy, erect or sprawling, densely-branched shrub that typically grows to a height of 0.15–1 m (5.9 in – 3 ft 3.4 in), its branches covered with soft hairs. The leaves overlap each other and are erect, egg-shaped or oblong, and usually less than 2.1 mm (0.083 in) long. The flowers are arranged on the ends of branches in dense spikes of a few flowers with leaf-like bracts and broad, keeled bracteoles at the base. The sepals are about 2 mm (0.079 in) long and the petals white, about 4 mm (0.16 in) long, the lobes longer than the petal tube.

== Taxonomy ==
Leucopogon fimbriatus was first formally described in 1859 by Sergei Sergeyevich Sheglejev in the Bulletin de la Société impériale des naturalistes de Moscou from specimens collected by James Drummond. The specific epithet (fimbriatus) means "fringed", referring to the leaves.

== Distribution and habitat ==
This leucopogon often grows in sandy soil and occurs in the Avon Wheatbelt, Coolgardie, Esperance Plains, Jarrah Forest and Mallee bioregions of south-western Western Australia.

== Conservation status ==
Leucopogon fimbriatus is listed as "not threatened" by the Government of Western Australia Department of Biodiversity, Conservation and Attractions.
