= Leucopogon prolatus =

Scientific classification
- Kingdom: Plantae
- Clade: Tracheophytes
- Clade: Angiosperms
- Clade: Eudicots
- Clade: Asterids
- Order: Ericales
- Family: Ericaceae
- Genus: Leucopogon
- Species: L. prolatus

Binomial name
- Leucopogon prolatus Hislop
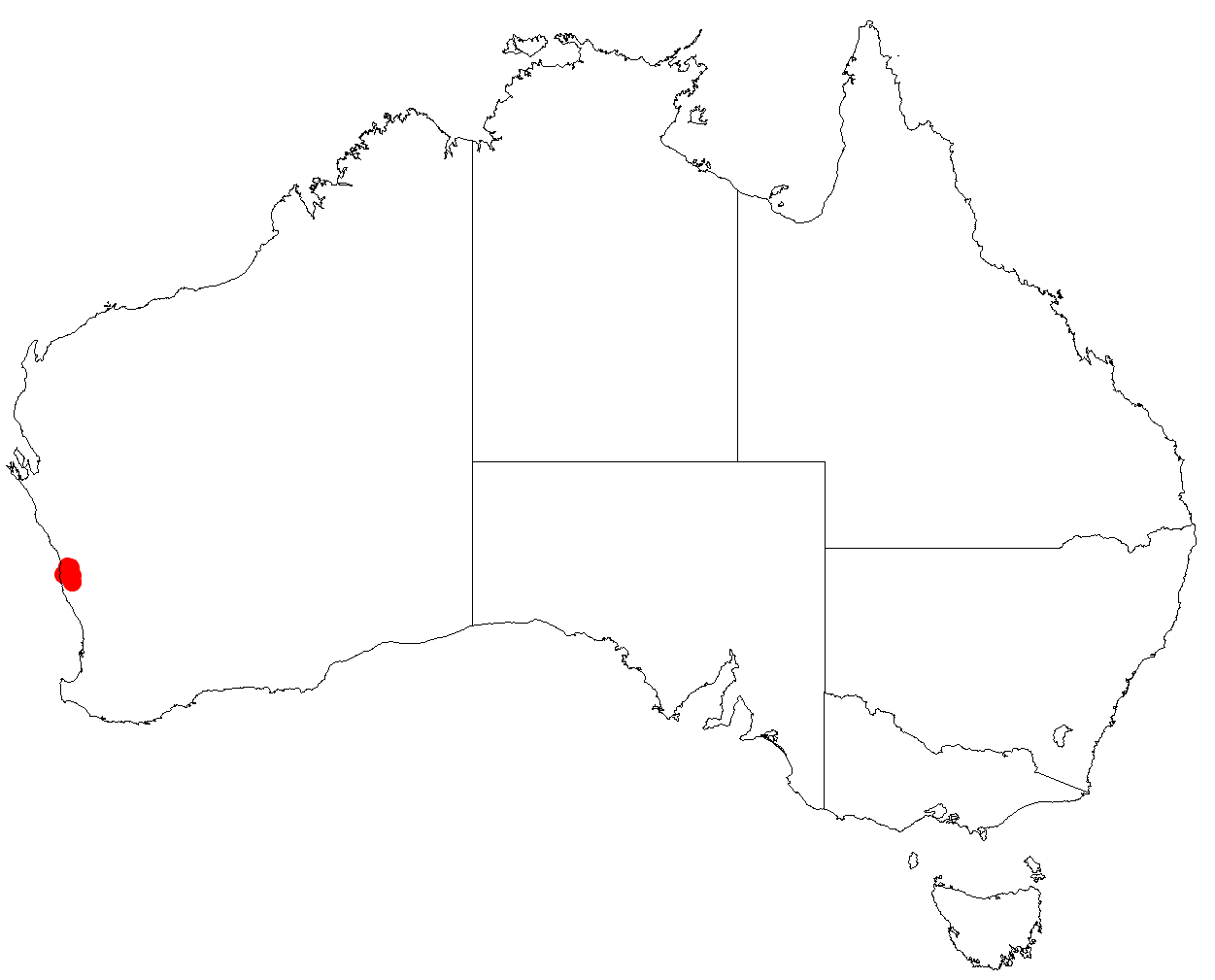
- Occurrence data from AVH

Species of plant

Leucopogon prolatus is a species of flowering plant in the heath family Ericaceae and is endemic to the south-west of Western Australia. It is an erect, open shrub with a single stem at ground level, egg-shaped to elliptic leaves and erect clusters of 3 to 14 white flowers on the ends of branches and short side-branches.

== Description ==
Leucopogon prolatus is an erect, open shrub that typically grows up to 90 cm (35 in) high, 70 cm (28 in) wide, and has a single stem at ground level. The leaves are spirally arranged, egg-shaped to elliptic, 2.8–7.0 mm (0.11–0.28 in) long and 0.8–2.2 mm (0.031–0.087 in) wide on short petiole. Both surfaces of the leaves are more or less glabrous, the lower surface with 7 to 11 main veins. The flowers are arranged in groups of 3 to 14 on the ends of branches or on short side-branches, with narrowly egg-shaped to narrowly elliptic bracts and egg-shaped bracteoles 1.3–2.2 mm (0.051–0.087 in) long. The sepals are narrowly egg-shaped, 2.3–3.2 mm (0.091–0.126 in) long, and the petals white and joined at the base to form a tube 1.5–2.2 mm (0.059–0.087 in) long and shorter than the sepals, the lobes 2.1–3.2 mm (0.083–0.126 in) long and densely bearded on the inner surface. Flowering occurs in many months and the fruit is a narrowly elliptic drupe 2.1–2.6 mm (0.083–0.102 in) long.

== Taxonomy and naming ==
Leucopogon prolatus was first formally described in 2016 by Michael Clyde Hislop in the journal Nuytsia from specimens collected by Jocelyn M. Powell near Eneabba in 1979. The specific epithet (prolatus) means "lengthened" or "extended", referring to the leaves, that are longer than those of the similar L. inflexus.

== Distribution and habitat ==
This leucopogon grows in heathland and low, open woodland in sandy soil and occurs from near Eneabba to near Warradarge and Stockyard Gully in the Geraldton Sandplains bioregion of Western Australia.

== Conservation status ==
Leucopogon prolatus is listed as "not threatened" by the Western Australian Government Department of Biodiversity, Conservation and Attractions.
