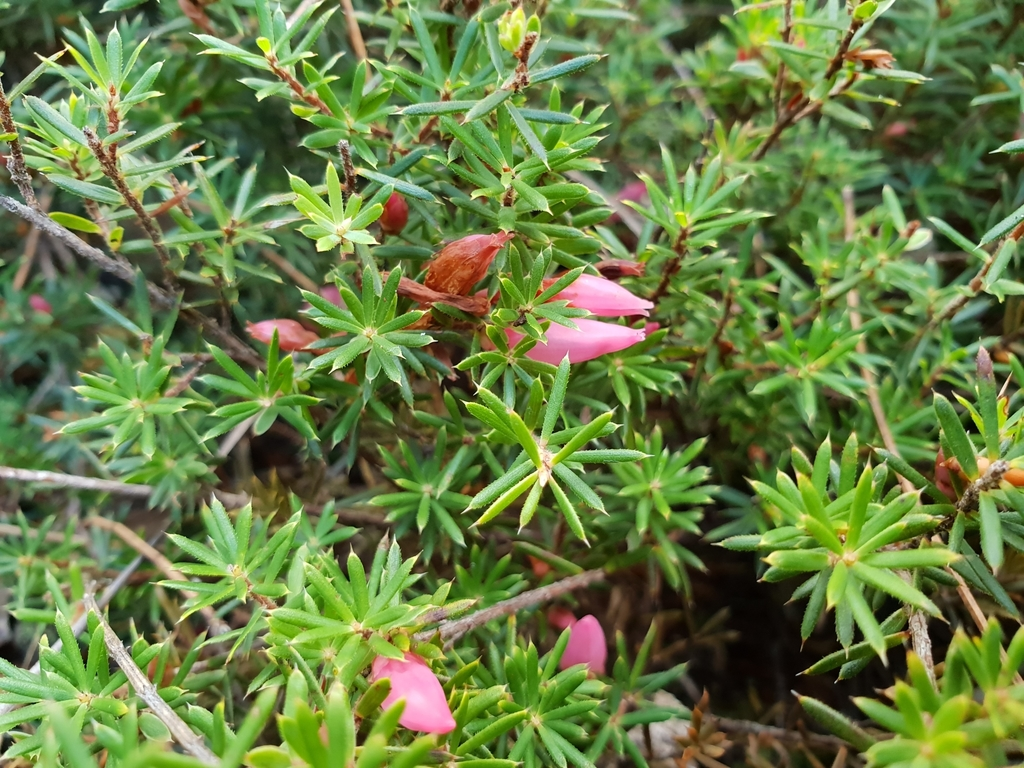
- In Yakamia

Scientific classification
- Kingdom: Plantae
- Clade: Tracheophytes
- Clade: Angiosperms
- Clade: Eudicots
- Clade: Asterids
- Order: Ericales
- Family: Ericaceae
- Genus: Styphelia
- Species: S. erectifolia

Binomial name
- Styphelia erectifolia Hislop, Crayn & Puente-Lel.

Synonyms
- Astroloma hirsutum Stschegl.

= Styphelia erectifolia =

Species of plant

Styphelia erectifolia is a species of flowering plant in the heath family Ericaceae and is endemic to the south-west of Western Australia. It is a shrub with often wand-like, erect or ascending, usually softly-hairy branches and a thick, woody trunk. The leaves are linear, tapering to a short point, the edges turned down or rolled under and usually less than 12 mm (0.47 in) long. The flowers are red, and nearly sessile, with bracteoles about 2 mm (0.079 in) long at the base. The sepals are about 6.5 mm (0.26 in) long, the petal tube 8.6–11 mm (0.34–0.43 in) long with lobes 4 mm (0.16 in) long and bearded inside.

This species was first formally described by Sergei Sergeyevich Sheglejev who gave it the name Astroloma hirsutum in the Bulletin de la Société Impériale des Naturalistes de Moscou from specimens collected by James Drummond. In 2020, Michael Clyde Hislop, Crayn and Caroline Puente-Lelievre transferred it to the genus Styphelia, but since there was another species Styphelia hirsuta (now known as Leucopogon hirsutus), they gave it the name S. erectifolia in Australian Systematic Botany. The specific epithet (erectifolia) means "upright leaved".

Styphelia erectifolia is found in the Jarrah Forest, Swan Coastal Plain and Warren bioregions of south-western Western Australia and listed as "not threatened" by the Western Australian Government Department of Biodiversity, Conservation and Attractions.
