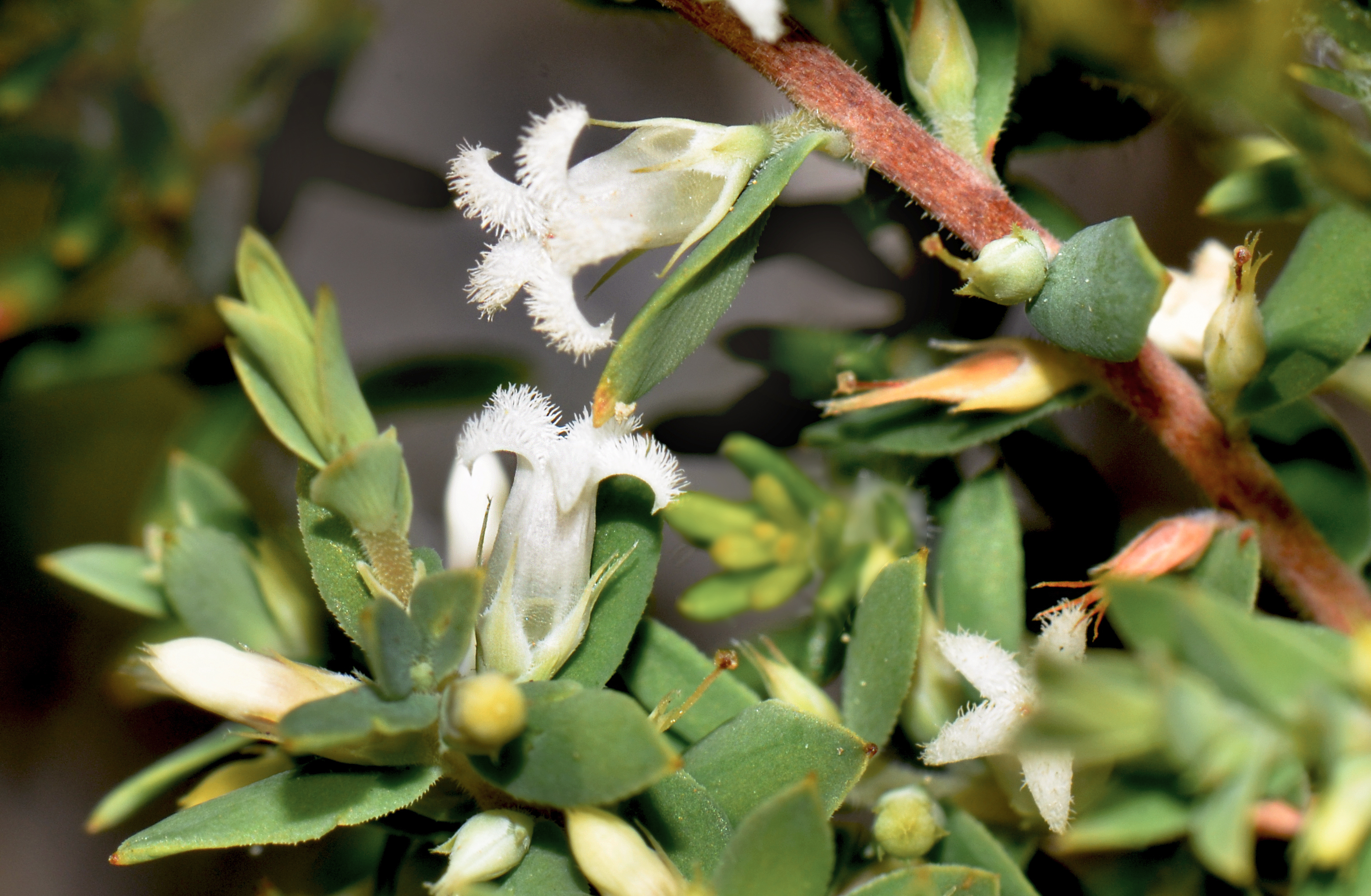

Conservation status
- Declared rare (DEC)

Scientific classification
- Kingdom: Plantae
- Clade: Tracheophytes
- Clade: Angiosperms
- Clade: Eudicots
- Clade: Asterids
- Order: Ericales
- Family: Ericaceae
- Genus: Styphelia
- Species: S. capillaris

Binomial name
- Styphelia capillaris Hislop & Puente-Lel.

= Styphelia capillaris =

Species of plant

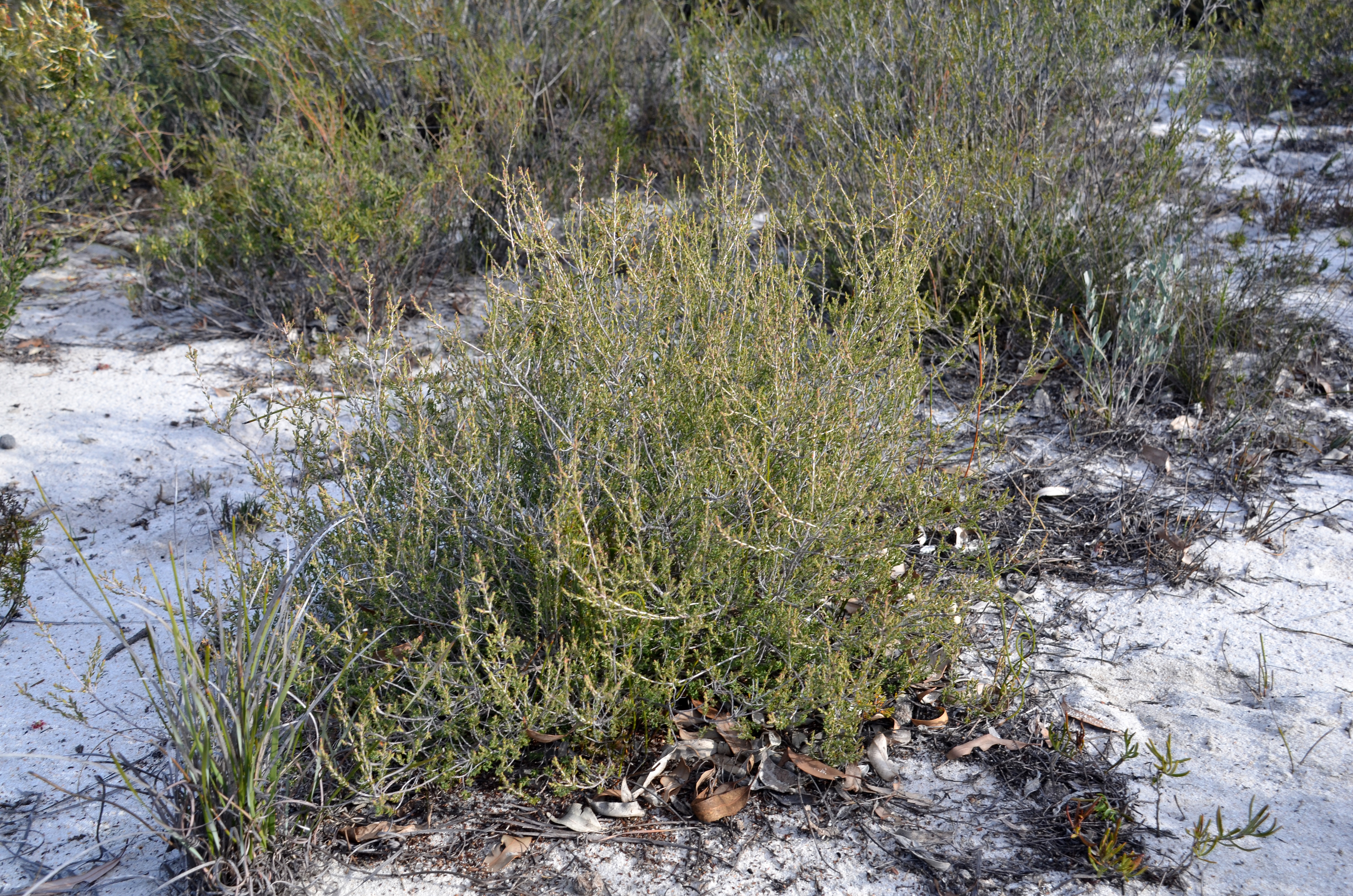
Habit

Styphelia capillaris, commonly known as Horts' styphelia, is a species of flowering plant in the heath family Ericaceae and is endemic to a small area of south-western Western Australia. It is a dense, spreading shrub with narrowly egg-shaped to narrowly elliptic leaves and white flowers arranged singly or in pairs in leaf axils.

== Description ==
Styphelia capillaris is a dense, spreading shrub that typically grows up to 0.8 m (2 ft 7 in) high and 1.5 m (4 ft 11 in) wide, its young branchlets hairy. The leaves are narrowly egg-shaped to narrowly elliptic, 2.0–4.2 mm (0.079–0.165 in) long, 1.2–2.2 mm (0.047–0.087 in) wide on a petiole 0.1–0.3 mm (0.0039–0.0118 in) long. The flowers are arranged singly or in pairs in leaf axils with egg-shaped bracteoles 1.2–1.5 mm (0.047–0.059 in) long and 0.5–0.6 mm (0.020–0.024 in) long at the base. The flowers are erect, the sepals narrowly egg-shaped, 2.0–2.7 mm (0.079–0.106 in) long 0.6–0.8 mm (0.024–0.031 in) wide. The petals are white, forming a tube 1.5–1.2 mm (0.059–0.047 in) long with lobes 1.8–2.3 mm (0.071–0.091 in) long and bearded on the inside. Flowering mainly occurs from October to December and the fruit is flattened, narrowly egg-shaped to narrowly elliptic, 4–5 mm (0.16–0.20 in) long and 1.6–1.8 mm (0.063–0.071 in) wide.

== Taxonomy ==
Styphelia capillaris was first formally described in 2020 by Michael Clyde Hislop and Caroline Puente-Lelievre in the journal Nuytsia from specimens collected south-west of York in 1999. The specific epithet (capillaris) means "hair-like" or "thread-like", referring to the tips of the sepals.

== Distribution and habitat ==
Horts' styphelia grows in heath and woodland on sand in a small area south-west of York, on the eastern Darling Range, in the Jarrah Forest bioregion of south-western Western Australia.

== Conservation status ==
Styphelia capillaris is listed as "Threatened Flora (Declared Rare Flora — Extant)" by the Department of Biodiversity, Conservation and Attractions.
