= Styphelia pubescens =

Scientific classification
- Kingdom: Plantae
- Clade: Tracheophytes
- Clade: Angiosperms
- Clade: Eudicots
- Clade: Asterids
- Order: Ericales
- Family: Ericaceae
- Genus: Styphelia
- Species: S. pubescens

Binomial name
- Styphelia pubescens (S.Moore) Hislop, Crayn & Puente-Lel.
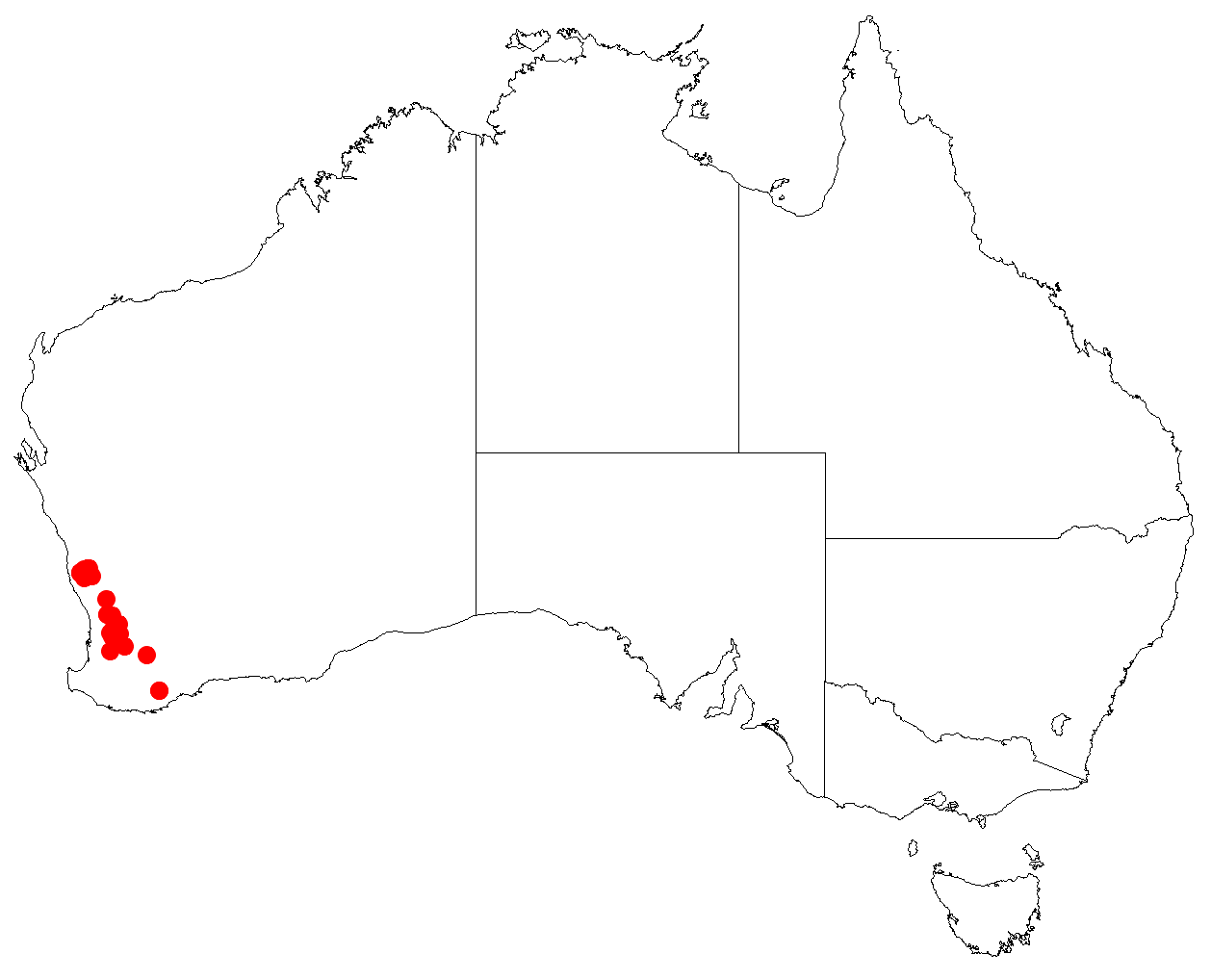
- Occurrence data from AVH

Synonyms
- Leucopogon pubescens S.Moore

Species of plant

Styphelia pubescens is a species of flowering plant in the heath family Ericaceae and is endemic to the south-west of Western Australia. The species was first formally described in 1920 by Spencer Le Marchant Moore who gave it the name Leucopogon pubescens in the Journal of the Linnean Society, Botany, from specimens collected by Frederick Stoward near Ongerup. In 2020, Michael Hislop, Darren Crayn and Caroline Puente-Lelievre transferred the species to Styphelia as S. pubescens in Australian Systematic Botany. The specific epithet (pubescens) means "covered with soft, fine hairs". Styphelia pubescens is found in the Avon Wheatbelt, Geraldton Sandplains, Jarrah Forest and Swan Coastal Plain bioregions of south-western Western Australia and is listed as "not threatened" by the Western Australian Government Department of Biodiversity, Conservation and Attractions.
