= Styphelia disjuncta =

Conservation status
- Declared rare (DEC)

Scientific classification
- Kingdom: Plantae
- Clade: Tracheophytes
- Clade: Angiosperms
- Clade: Eudicots
- Clade: Asterids
- Order: Ericales
- Family: Ericaceae
- Genus: Styphelia
- Species: S. disjuncta

Binomial name
- Styphelia disjuncta Hislop & Puente-Lel.

Species of plant

Styphelia disjuncta is a species of flowering plant in the heath family Ericaceae and is endemic to a small area in the south-west of Western Australia. It is an erect shrub with egg-shaped to narrowly egg-shaped leaves, and white, tube-shaped flowers arranged singly in leaf axils.

== Description ==
Styphelia disjuncta is an erect shrub that typically grows up to 60 cm (24 in) high and wide, its young branchlets densely hairy. The leaves are erect, egg-shaped to narrowly egg-shaped, 3.0–6.8 mm (0.12–0.27 in) long and 1.2–2.4 mm (0.047–0.094 in) wide on a petiole 0.3–0.5 mm (0.012–0.020 in) long. There is a sharp point on the end of the leaves and the lower surface is a slightly lighter shade of green. The flowers are arranged singly in leaf axils with egg-shaped bracts 1.3–1.8 mm (0.051–0.071 in) long and egg-shaped bracteoles 2.0–2.6 mm (0.079–0.102 in) long and 1.7–1.8 mm (0.067–0.071 in) long at the base. The sepals are narrowly egg-shaped, 4.2–5.3 mm (0.17–0.21 in) long and 1.6–2.0 mm (0.063–0.079 in) wide, the petals white, forming a tube 3.3–4.2 mm (0.13–0.17 in) long with lobes 3.2–4.0 mm (0.13–0.16 in) long. Flowering occurs from June to early September and the fruit is oval, 3.3–3.5 mm (0.13–0.14 in) long and 1.8–2.2 mm (0.071–0.087 in) wide.

== Taxonomy ==
Styphelia disjuncta was first formally described in 2019 by Michael Clyde Hislop and Caroline Puente-Lelievre in the journal Nuytsia from specimens collected by Hislop west of Lake Grace in 2001. The specific epithet (disjuncta) means "separate or distinct", referring to the geographical disjunction between the northern and southern populations of this species.

== Distribution and habitat ==
This styphelia grows in sand or sandy loam in the Dumbleyung and Ongerup areas in heath or open mallee woodland in the Esperance Plains and Mallee bioregions of south-western Western Australia.

== Conservation status ==
Styphelia disjuncta is listed as "critically endangered" under the Australian Government Environment Protection and Biodiversity Conservation Act 1999 and as "Threatened" by the Western Australian Government Department of Biodiversity, Conservation and Attractions, meaning that it is in danger of extinction.
