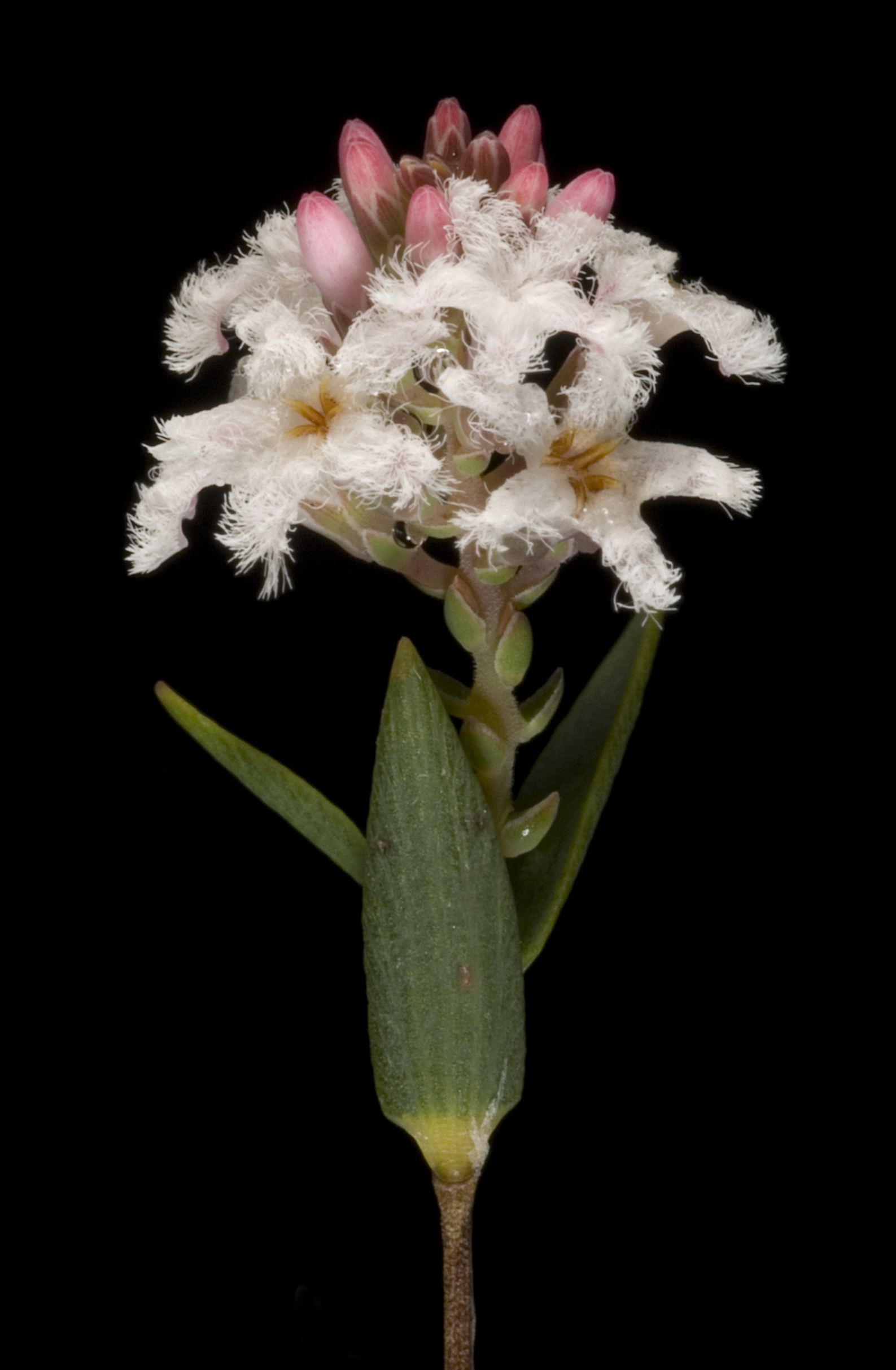

Scientific classification
- Kingdom: Plantae
- Clade: Tracheophytes
- Clade: Angiosperms
- Clade: Eudicots
- Clade: Asterids
- Order: Ericales
- Family: Ericaceae
- Genus: Leucopogon
- Species: L. tenuicaulis

Binomial name
- Leucopogon tenuicaulis J.M.Powell ex Hislop
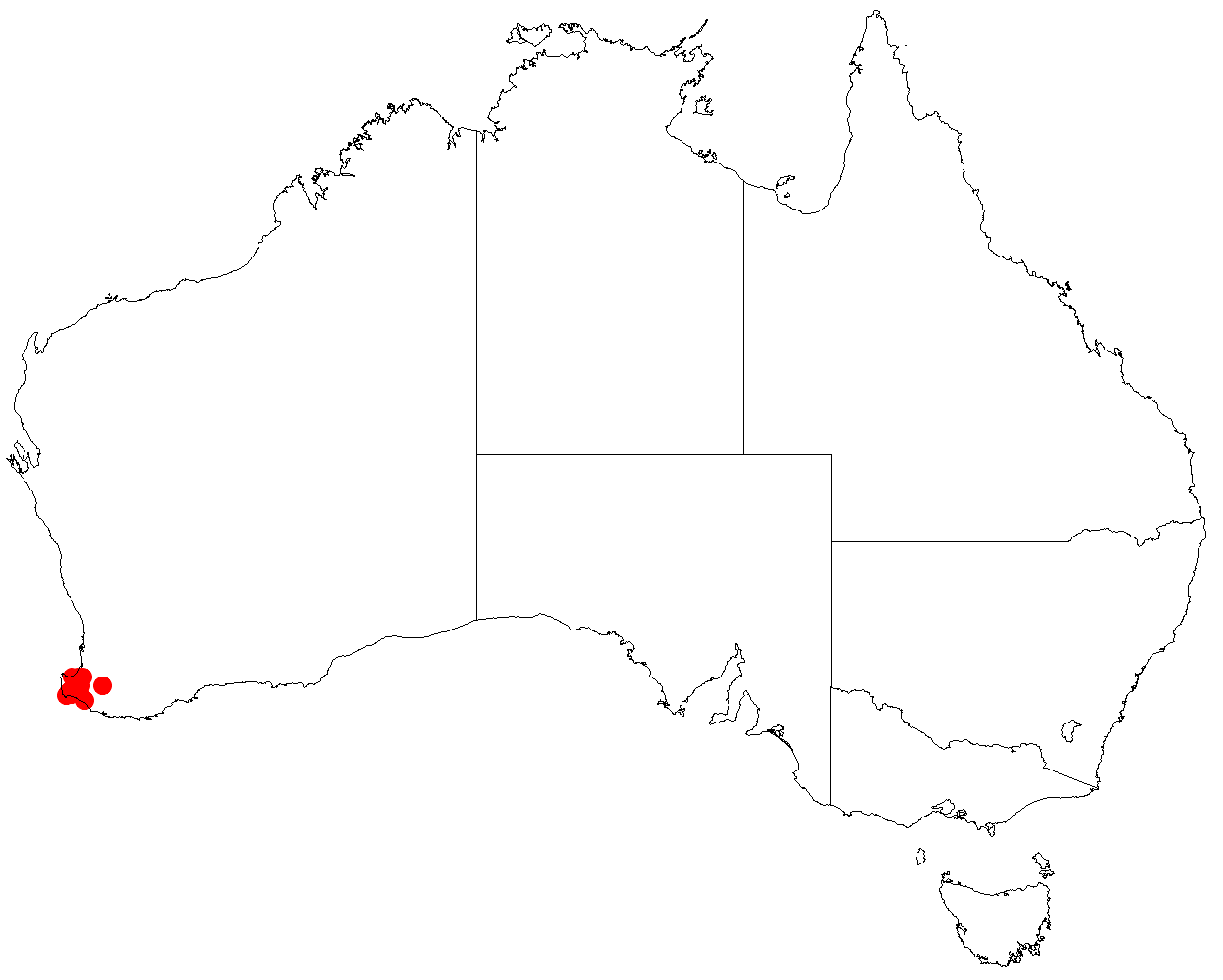
- Occurrence data from AVH

= Leucopogon tenuicaulis =

Species of shrub

Leucopogon tenuicaulis is a species of flowering plant in the heath family Ericaceae and is endemic to the far southwest of Western Australia. It is an erect or sprawling shrub with thin stems, upright triangular to narrowly egg-shaped or narrowly elliptic leaves and erect, white or pale pink, tube-shaped flowers arranged in large groups on the ends of branches and in upper leaf axils.

== Description ==
Leucopogon tenuicaulis is a slender, erect to sprawling shrub that typically grows up to 50 cm (20 in) high and wide, and has a single stem at the base. Its young branchlets are thin, glabrous and reddish- or yellowish-brown. The leaves are more or less erect, narrowly egg-shaped or narrowly elliptic, 5–22 mm (0.20–0.87 in) long 1.7–5.2 mm (0.067–0.205 in) wide and more or less stem-clasping on a brownish petiole 0.4–1.1 mm (0.016–0.043 in) long. Both sides of the leaves are glabrous and there are usually five to seven indistinct veins visible on the lower surface. The flowers are erect, and arranged on the ends of the branches and in upper leaf axils in groups of 11 to 28. There are egg-shaped bracts 0.9–1.3 mm (0.035–0.051 in) long and egg-shaped bracteoles 0.6–1.1 mm (0.024–0.043 in) long at the base of the flowers. The sepals are egg-shaped or narrowly egg-shaped, 1.2–2.1 mm (0.047–0.083 in) long, the petals white or pale pink, and joined at the base, forming a narrowly bell-shaped or cylindrical tube 0.3–2.0 mm (0.012–0.079 in) long. The petal lobes are 1.4–2.0 mm (0.055–0.079 in) long and densely bearded inside. Flowering mainly occurs from August to December and the fruit is an oval drupe 1.8–2.1 mm (0.071–0.083 in) long.

== Taxonomy ==
Leucopogon tenuicaulis was first formally described in 2009 by Michael Hislop in the journal Nuytsia from an unpublished description by Jocelyn Powell of specimens collected in 1993 near Nannup by Alex George. The specific epithet, (tenuicaulis) means "a thin stem".

== Distribution and habitat ==
This leucopogon grows in winter-wet heath and woodland on the flats to the north, north-east and east of Augusta in the Jarrah Forest, Swan Coastal Plain and Warren bioregions in the far south-west of Western Australia.

== Conservation status ==
Leucopogon tenuicaulis is listed as "not threatened" by the Western Australian Government Department of Biodiversity, Conservation and Attractions.
