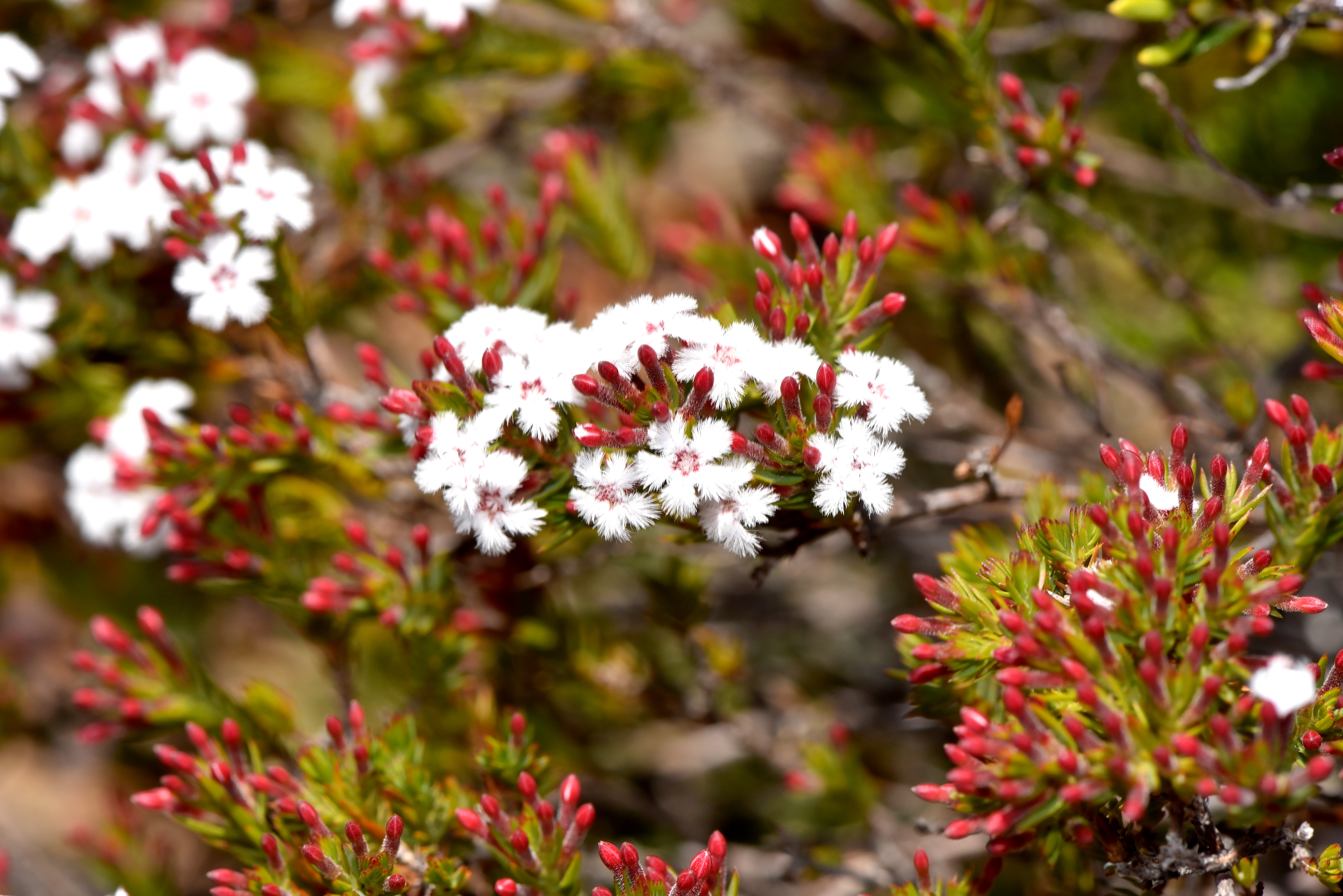

Conservation status
- Priority Three — Poorly Known Taxa (DEC)

Scientific classification
- Kingdom: Plantae
- Clade: Tracheophytes
- Clade: Angiosperms
- Clade: Eudicots
- Clade: Asterids
- Order: Ericales
- Family: Ericaceae
- Genus: Styphelia
- Species: S. williamsiorum

Binomial name
- Styphelia williamsiorum Hislop & Puente-Lel.

= Styphelia williamsiorum =

Species of shrub

Styphelia williamsiorum is a species of flowering plant in the heath family Ericaceae and is endemic to a small area in the south-west of Western Australia. It is a low, compact shrub with decussate, narrowly egg-shaped leaves, and deep purple, tube-shaped flowers with hairy lobes.

== Description ==
Styphelia williamsiorum is a low, compact shrub that typically grows up to 30 cm (12 in) high and 40 cm (16 in) side, its young branchlets hairy. The leaves are decussate, pressed against the stems, narrowly egg-shaped, 3.0–7.0 mm (0.12–0.28 in) long and 0.5–1.8 mm (0.020–0.071 in) wide. The flowers are arranged singly in leaf axils with elliptic to egg-shaped bracts 0.3–0.5 mm (0.012–0.020 in) long and bracteoles 1.0–1.4 mm (0.039–0.055 in) long at the base. The sepals are narrowly egg-shaped, 1.7–2.4 mm (0.067–0.094 in) long. The petals are deep purple, joined at the base, forming a tube 3.3–5.8 mm (0.13–0.23 in) long with the lobes curved back, 1.3–2.2 mm (0.051–0.087 in) long and densely hairy on the inside. Flowering occurs between mid-October and mid-December and the fruit is narrowly elliptic, 2.0–2.2 mm (0.079–0.087 in) long and 0.5–0.6 mm (0.020–0.024 in) long.

== Taxonomy ==
Styphelia williamsiorum was first formally described in 2017 by Michael Clyde Hislop and Caroline Puente-Lelièvre in the journal Nuytsia. The specific epithet (williamsiorum) honours Don and Joy Williams of Badgingarra.

== Distribution and habitat ==
This species occurs in the Geraldton Sandplains bioregion of south-western Western Australia from south of Eneabba to Badgingarra and as far east as the Alexander Morrison National Park, where it grows in shallow sandy soil in low heath.

== Conservation status ==
Styphelia williamsiorum is listed as "Priority Three" by the Government of Western Australia Department of Biodiversity, Conservation and Attractions, meaning that it is poorly known and known from only a few locations but is not under imminent threat.
