= Styphelia blakei =

Scientific classification
- Kingdom: Plantae
- Clade: Tracheophytes
- Clade: Angiosperms
- Clade: Eudicots
- Clade: Asterids
- Order: Ericales
- Family: Ericaceae
- Genus: Styphelia
- Species: S. blakei

Binomial name
- Styphelia blakei (Pedley) Hislop, Crayn & Puente-Lel.
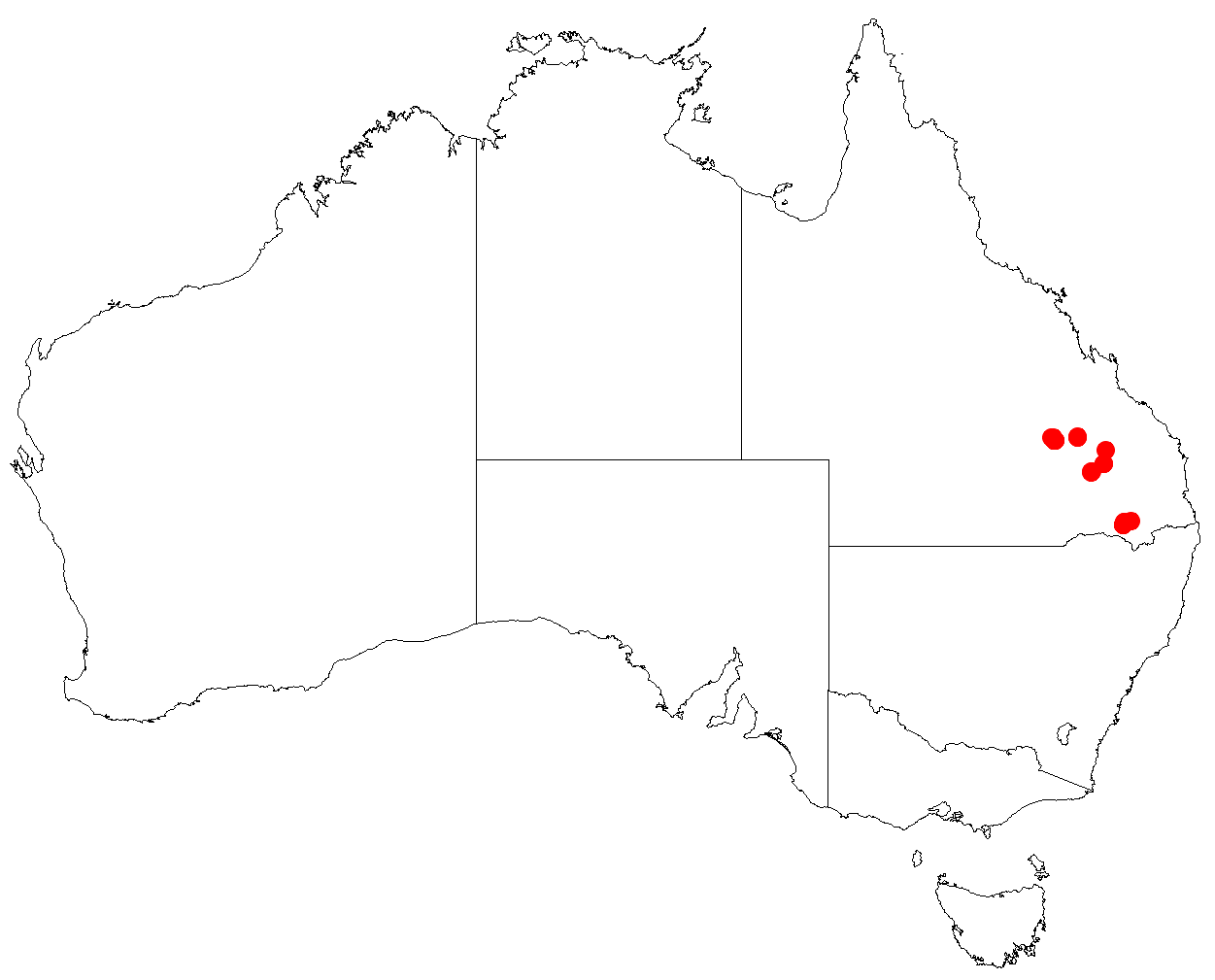
- Occurrence data from AVH

Species of shrub

Styphelia blakei is a species of flowering plant in the heath family Ericaceae and is endemic to inland southern Queensland. It is a sometimes prostrate, twiggy shrub with hairy branches, egg-shaped leaves with the narrower end towards the base, and small white flowers.

== Description ==
Styphelia blakei is a sometimes prostrate shrub with twiggy, softly-hairy branchlets, that typically grows to a height of up to 75 cm (30 in). Its leaves are egg-shaped with the narrower end towards the base, 2–3.6 mm (0.079–0.142 in) long, 1–2 mm (0.039–0.079 in) wide and sessile. The leaves are slightly concave, slightly turned downwards and slightly softly-hairy on the lower surface. The flowers are arranged singly in leaf axils on short side-branches and are more or less sessile, with bracts and longer bracteoles about 1.5 mm (0.059 in) long. The sepals are 2.8 mm (0.11 in) long and the petals are white and form a tube about 1.7 mm (0.067 in) long with lobes about 1.3 mm (0.051 in) long and hairy near the ends. The fruit is an elliptic drupe about 3 mm (0.12 in) long.

== Taxonomy ==
This species was first formally described in 1990 by Leslie Pedley in the journal Austrobaileya from specimens collected in the Carnarvon Range by Clifford Gittins in 1960. In 2020, Michael Hislop, Daren Crayn and Caroline Puente-Lelievre transferred the species to Styphelia as S. blakei in the Australian Systematic Botany. The specific epithet (blakei) honours Stanley Thatcher Blake.

== Distribution and habitat ==
Styphelia blakei grows on shallow sandy soil in inland southern Queensland.
