= Styphelia longissima =

Conservation status
- Declared rare (DEC)

Scientific classification
- Kingdom: Plantae
- Clade: Tracheophytes
- Clade: Angiosperms
- Clade: Eudicots
- Clade: Asterids
- Order: Ericales
- Family: Ericaceae
- Genus: Styphelia
- Species: S. longissima

Binomial name
- Styphelia longissima Hislop & Puente-Lel.

Species of shrub

Styphelia longissima is a species of flowering plant in the heath family Ericaceae and is endemic to a few places in the south-west of Western Australia. It is an erect shrub with hairy young branchlets, stem-clasping, sharply-pointed, narrowly egg-shaped to narrowly elliptic leaves, and white, tube-shaped flowers.

== Description ==
Styphelia longissima is an erect shrub with hairy young branchlets, that typically grows up to 70 cm (28 in) high and 70 cm (28 in) wide. Its leaves are stem-clasping, narrowly egg-shaped to narrowly elliptic, 7–13 mm (0.28–0.51 in) long and 2.0–3.8 mm (0.079–0.150 in) wide on a petiole 0.8–1.5 mm (0.031–0.059 in) long. The end of the leaves is sharply-pointed and the edges usually have hairs 0.5–1.0 mm (0.020–0.039 in) long. The flowers are arranged singly in leaf axils and are erect and sessile with egg-shaped to elliptic bracts 1.8–2.5 mm (0.071–0.098 in) long and bracteoles 2.4–3.2 mm (0.094–0.126 in) long and 1.5–2.0 mm (0.059–0.079 in) wide. The sepals are narrowly egg-shaped to narrowly elliptic, 5.0–6.8 mm (0.20–0.27 in) long and 1.4–1.8 mm (0.055–0.071 in) wide and straw-coloured. The petals are white and joined at the base to form a tube 4.4–4.8 mm (0.17–0.19 in) long and 2.5–3.0 mm (0.098–0.118 in) wide, with lobes that are turned back and 3.2–4.0 mm (0.13–0.16 in) long. Flowering occurs between May and July.

== Taxonomy ==
Styphelia longissima was first formally described in 2017 by Michael Hislop and Caroline Puente-Lelievre in the journal Nuytsia from specimens collected north of Eneabba in 2004. The specific epithet (longissima) means "very long", referring to the point on the end of the leaf, and the hairs on the edges of the leaves and ovary.

== Distribution and habitat ==
This styphelia grows in heath and open, low woodland on yellow sand in a small area near Eneabba in the Avon Wheatbelt and Geraldton Sandplains bioregions of south-western Western Australia.

== Conservation status ==
Styphelia longissima is listed as "Threatened Flora (Declared Rare Flora — Extant)" by the Western Australian Government Department of Biodiversity, Conservation and Attractions.
