= Leucopogon canaliculatus =

Scientific classification
- Kingdom: Plantae
- Clade: Tracheophytes
- Clade: Angiosperms
- Clade: Eudicots
- Clade: Asterids
- Order: Ericales
- Family: Ericaceae
- Genus: Leucopogon
- Species: L. canaliculatus

Binomial name
- Leucopogon canaliculatus Hislop
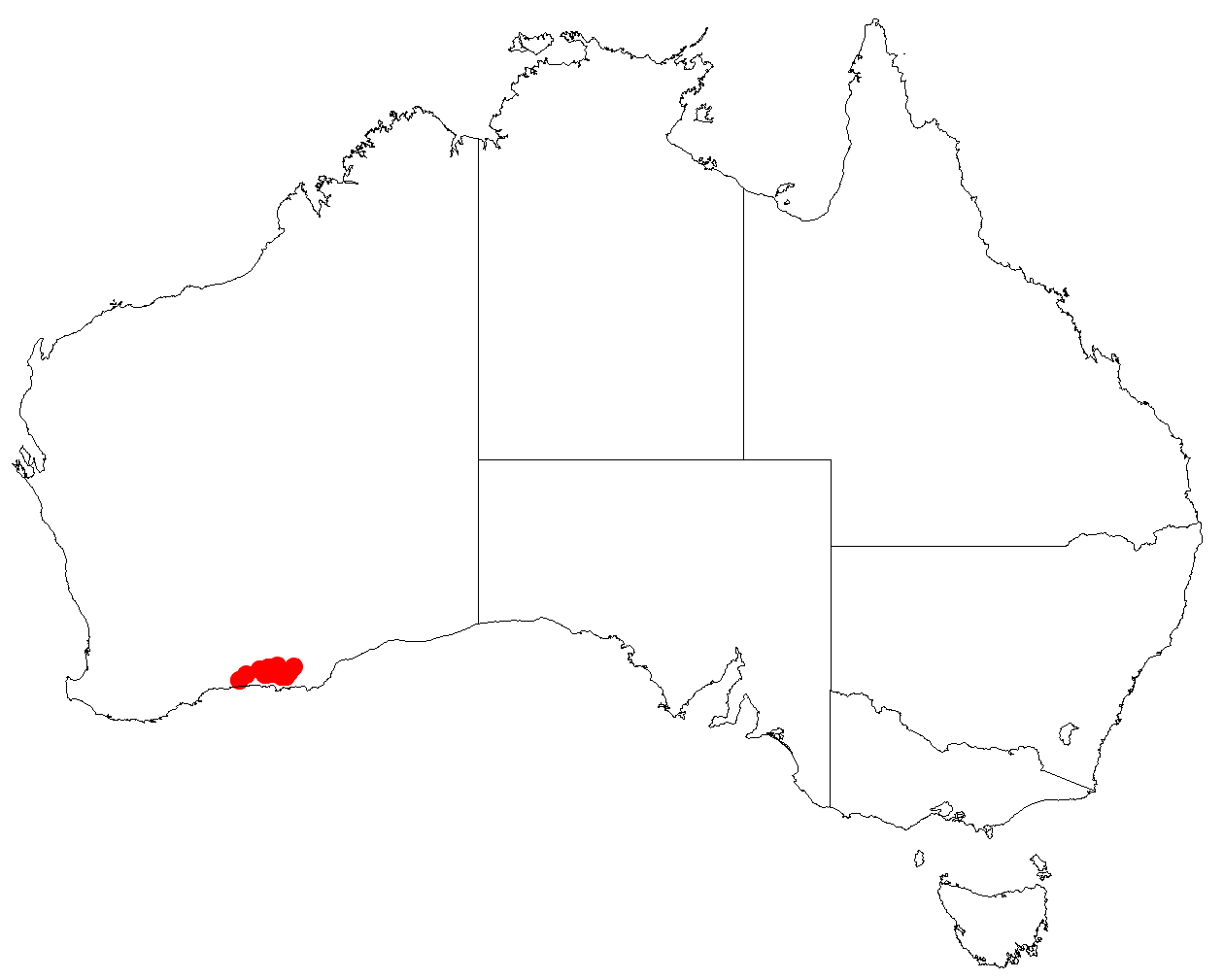
- Occurrence data from AVH

Species of plant

Leucopogon canaliculatus is a species of flowering plant in the heath family Ericaceae and is endemic to the south-west of Western Australia. It is an erect shrub with more or less glabrous branchlets, linear leaves and white flowers arranged in clusters at the ends of branches.

== Description ==
Leucopogon canaliculatus is an erect shrub that typically grows up to about 100 cm (39 in) high and 100 cm (39 in) wide. The leaves are spirally arranged and point upwards, more or less glabrous, linear, 5–13 mm (0.20–0.51 in) long and 0.9–1.6 mm (0.035–0.063 in) wide on a petiole 0.7–1.3 mm (0.028–0.051 in) long. The edges of the leaves are rolled under, obscuring most of the lower surface and forming a longitudinal groove. The flowers are arranged in groups of seven to seventeen 9–18 mm (0.35–0.71 in) long on the ends of branches, with egg-shaped bracts 1.1–1.7 mm (0.043–0.067 in) long and similar bracteoles. The sepals are egg-shaped, 1.9–2.5 mm (0.075–0.098 in) long and usually tinged with purple near the tip. The petals are white and joined at the base to form a bell-shaped tube 1.3–1.9 mm (0.051–0.075 in) long, the lobes 1.7–2.6 mm (0.067–0.102 in) long. Flowering occurs from March to July and the fruit is a flattened spherical, glabrous drupe 1.3–1.8 mm (0.051–0.071 in) long and wide.

== Taxonomy and naming ==
Leucopogon canaliculatus was first formally described in 2009 by Michael Clyde Hislop in the journal Nuytsia from specimens collected north of Scaddan in 2002. The specific epithet (canaliculatus) means "channelled", referring to the groove on the lower surface of the leaves.

== Distribution and habitat ==
This leucopogon usually grows in mallee woodland and heath in a narrow band from near Grass Patch to Kau Rock Nature Reserve north of Condingup in the Esperance plains and Mallee bioregions of south-western Western Australia.

== Conservation status ==
Leucopogon canaliculatus is classified as "not threatened" by the Western Australian Government Department of Biodiversity, Conservation and Attractions.
