= Leucopogon navicularis =

Conservation status
- Priority One — Poorly Known Taxa (DEC)

Scientific classification
- Kingdom: Plantae
- Clade: Tracheophytes
- Clade: Angiosperms
- Clade: Eudicots
- Clade: Asterids
- Order: Ericales
- Family: Ericaceae
- Genus: Leucopogon
- Species: L. navicularis

Binomial name
- Leucopogon navicularis Hislop
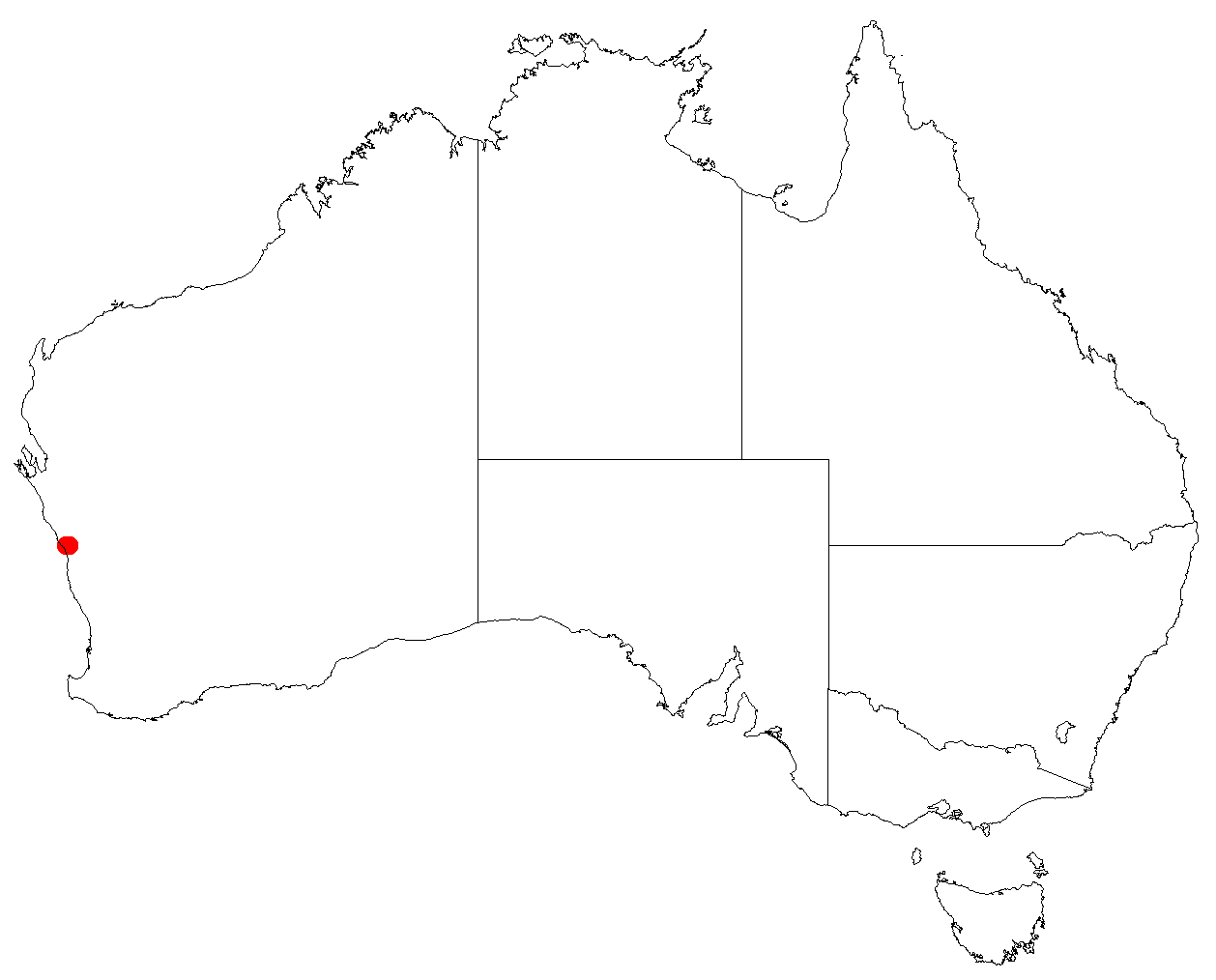
- Occurrence data from AVH

Species of plant

Leucopogon navicularis is a species of flowering plant in the heath family Ericaceae and is endemic to the southwest of Western Australia. It is an erect, compact shrub with hairy young branchlets, narrowly elliptic to narrowly egg-shaped leaves and erect, compact clusters of 4 to 12 white, bell-shaped flowers in upper leaf axils or on the ends of branches.

== Description ==
Leucopogon navicularis is an erect, compact shrub that typically grows up to about 60 cm (24 in) high and 40 cm (16 in) wide, its young branchlets densely covered with straight hairs. The leaves are spirally arranged, narrowly elliptic to narrowly egg-shaped, about 4–10 mm (0.16–0.39 in) long and 1.2–2.8 mm (0.047–0.110 in) wide on a cream-coloured or pale brown petiole up to 1.5 mm (0.059 in) long. The upper surface of the leaves is covered with short, white hairs and the lower surface is glabrous. The flowers are arranged in compact clusters of 4 to 12 at the ends of branchlets or in upper leaf axils, with narrowly egg-shaped bracts 1.0–2.2 mm (0.039–0.087 in) long, and egg-shaped bracteoles 0.8–1.4 mm (0.031–0.055 in) long, the sepals egg-shaped and 1.9–2.2 mm (0.075–0.087 in) long. The petals are white, joined at the base to form a bell-shaped tube 1.0–1.3 mm (0.039–0.051 in) long, the lobes widely spreading, curved backwards, 2.5–3.1 mm (0.098–0.122 in) long and densely bearded inside. Flowering mainly occurs from spring to early summer and the fruit is a narrowly elliptic drupe 2.5–2.8 mm (0.098–0.110 in) long.

== Taxonomy and naming ==
Leucopogon navicularis was first formally described in 2012 by Michael Clyde Hislop in the journal Nuytsia from specimens he collected near Dongara in 2011. The specific epithet (navicularis) means "boat-shaped", referring to the leaves.

== Distribution and habitat ==
This leucopogon grows in disturbed heath and occurs in a small area north-west of Dongara in the Geraldton Sandplains bioregion of southwestern Western Australia.

== Conservation status ==
Leucopogon navicularis is listed as "Priority One" by the Government of Western Australia Department of Biodiversity, Conservation and Attractions, meaning that it is known from only one or a few locations which are potentially at risk.
