= Leucopogon extremus =

Conservation status
- Priority Two — Poorly Known Taxa (DEC)

Scientific classification
- Kingdom: Plantae
- Clade: Tracheophytes
- Clade: Angiosperms
- Clade: Eudicots
- Clade: Asterids
- Order: Ericales
- Family: Ericaceae
- Genus: Leucopogon
- Species: L. extremus

Binomial name
- Leucopogon extremus Hislop & Puente-Lel.
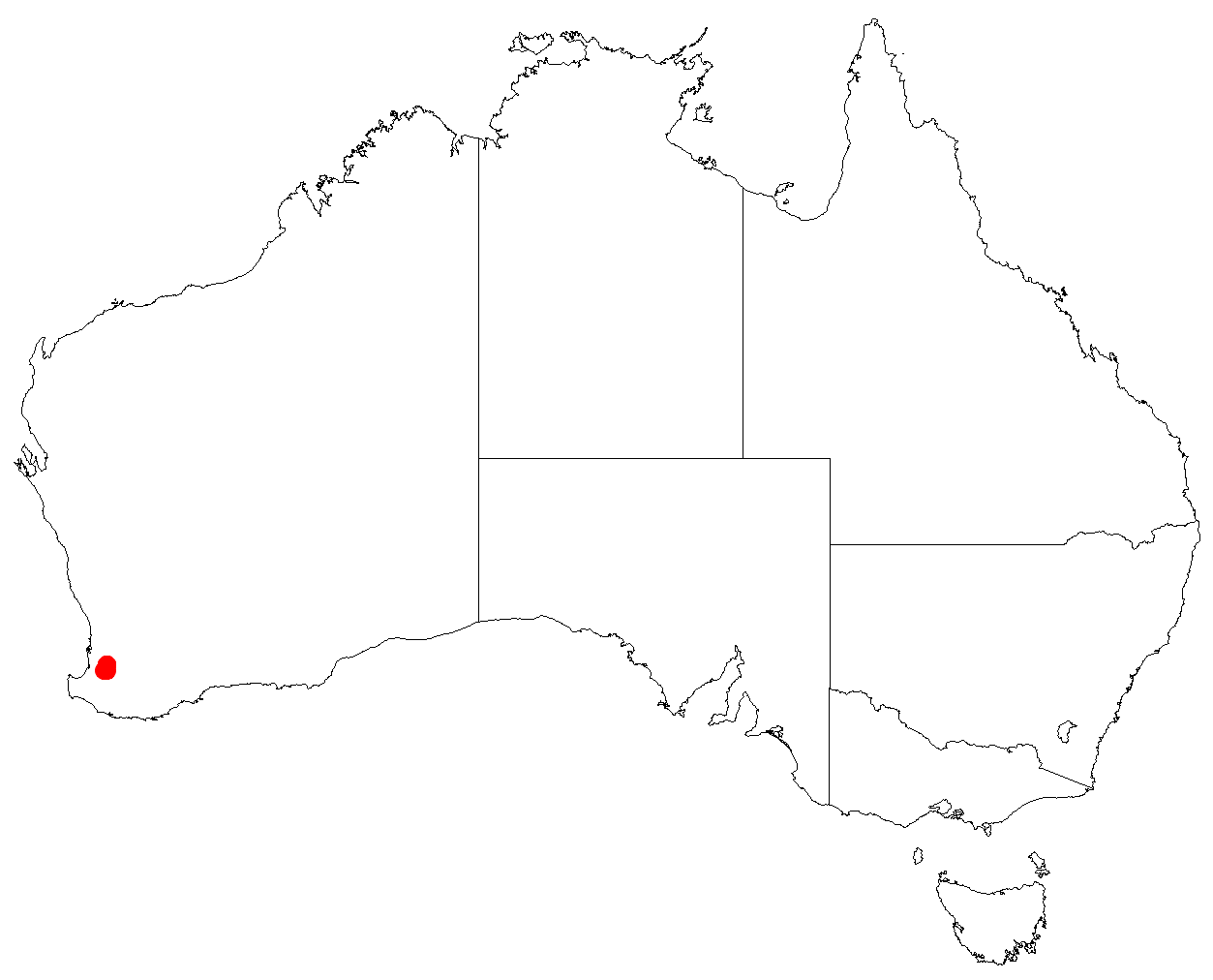
- Occurrence data from AVH

Species of plant

Leucopogon extremus is a species of flowering plant in the heath family Ericaceae and is endemic to a restricted part of the Jarrah Forest bioregion in the south-west of Western Australia. It is a shrub with "remarkably anomalous morphology. The species was first formally described in 2012 by Michael Clyde Hislop and Caroline Puente-Lelièvre from specimens collected north-west of Collie in 2006. The specific epithet (extremus) refers to the "remarkably aberrant morphology" of the species. It is listed as "Priority Two" by the Western Australian Government Department of Biodiversity, Conservation and Attractions, meaning that it is poorly known and from only one or a few locations.
