= Leucopogon corymbiformis =

Scientific classification
- Kingdom: Plantae
- Clade: Tracheophytes
- Clade: Angiosperms
- Clade: Eudicots
- Clade: Asterids
- Order: Ericales
- Family: Ericaceae
- Genus: Leucopogon
- Species: L. corymbiformis

Binomial name
- Leucopogon corymbiformis Hislop

Species of plant

Leucopogon corymbiformis is a species of flowering plant in the heath family Ericaceae and is endemic to the south-west of Western Australia. It is an erect shrub with glabrous branchlets, narrowly elliptic to egg-shaped leaves with the narrower end towards the base, and white, bell-shaped flowers arranged in leaf axils and at the ends of branches.

== Description ==
Leucopogon corymbiformis is an erect shrub that typically grows up to about 70 cm (28 in) high and wide with a single stem at the base. The leaves are spirally arranged and point upwards, more or less glabrous, narrowly elliptic to egg-shaped with the narrower end towards the base, 3.0–7.5 mm (0.12–0.30 in) long and 1.0–1.8 mm (0.039–0.071 in) wide on a petiole 0.3–0.8 mm (0.012–0.031 in) long. The flowers are arranged in groups of three to twelve 4–9 mm (0.16–0.35 in) long on the ends of branches and in upper leaf axils, with narrow egg-shaped bracts 1.1–1.7 mm (0.043–0.067 in) long and egg-shaped bracteoles 1.1–1.5 mm (0.043–0.059 in) long. The sepals are egg-shaped, 1.6–2.5 mm (0.063–0.098 in) long and tinged with purple near the tip. The petals are white and joined at the base to form a bell-shaped tube 1.2–1.6 mm (0.047–0.063 in) long, the lobes 1.8–2.4 mm (0.071–0.094 in) long. Flowering occurs from July to September and the fruit is a cylindrical or oval drupe 2.5–3.0 mm (0.098–0.118 in) long.

== Taxonomy and naming ==
Leucopogon corymbiformis was first formally described in 2014 by Michael Clyde Hislop in the journal Nuytsia from specimens he collected in Cape Arid National Park in 2012. The specific epithet (corymbiformis) means "corymb-shaped".

== Distribution and habitat ==
This leucopogon grows in woodland or heath and occurs in two disjunct areas 20–30 km (12–19 mi) north of Esperance and in Cape Arid National Park, in the south-west of Western Australia.

== Conservation status ==
Leucopogon corymbiformis is classified as "Priority Two" by the Western Australian Government Department of Biodiversity, Conservation and Attractions, meaning that it is poorly known and from only one or a few locations.
