= Styphelia cernua =

Conservation status
- Priority Two — Poorly Known Taxa (DEC)

Scientific classification
- Kingdom: Plantae
- Clade: Tracheophytes
- Clade: Angiosperms
- Clade: Eudicots
- Clade: Asterids
- Order: Ericales
- Family: Ericaceae
- Genus: Styphelia
- Species: S. cernua

Binomial name
- Styphelia cernua Hislop & Puente-Lel.

Species of plant

Styphelia cernua is a species of flowering plant in the heath family Ericaceae and is endemic to a small area of Western Australia. It is an erect shrub with narrowly egg-shaped leaves with the narrower end towards the base, and white flowers arranged singly or in pairs in leaf axils.

== Description ==
Styphelia cernua is an erect shrub that typically grows up to 1.7 m (5 ft 7 in) high and 1.5 m (4 ft 11 in) wide, its young branchlets hairy. The leaves are directed upwards and are narrowly egg-shaped with the narrower end towards the base, 9.0–18.0 mm (0.35–0.71 in) long and 2.0–3.2 mm (0.079–0.126 in) wide on a petiole 1.0–1.7 mm (0.039–0.067 in) long. There is a sharp point on the end of the leaves and the lower surface is a lighter shade of green. The flowers are usually arranged singly in leaf axils with elliptic to more or less round bracts 1.3–2.1 mm (0.051–0.083 in) long and bracteoles 2.6–3.5 mm (0.10–0.14 in) long and 2.0–2.7 mm (0.079–0.106 in) long at the base. The sepals are narrowly egg-shaped, 5.6–6.5 mm (0.22–0.26 in) long and 2.5–2.8 mm (0.098–0.110 in) wide, the petals white, forming a tube 4.5–5.8 mm (0.18–0.23 in) long with lobes 2.6–2.7 mm (0.10–0.11 in) long. Flowering occurs from June to August and the fruit is elliptic, 6.2–7.0 mm (0.24–0.28 in) long and 4.0–4.5 mm (0.16–0.18 in) wide.

== Taxonomy ==
Styphelia cernua was first formally described in 2019 by Michael Clyde Hislop and Caroline Puente-Lelievre in the journal Nuytsia from specimens collected near Port Gregory in 2010. The specific epithet (cernua) means "slightly drooping", comparing the flowers to the erect flowers of other species in its group.

== Distribution and habitat ==
This styphelia grows in low, open woodland or heath in and around Kalbarri National Park, in the Geraldton Sandplains bioregion of south-western Western Australia.

== Conservation status ==
Styphelia cernua is listed as "Priority Two" by the Western Australian Government Department of Biodiversity, Conservation and Attractions, meaning that it is poorly known and from only one or a few locations.
