= Styphelia filifolia =

Conservation status
- Priority Three — Poorly Known Taxa (DEC)

Scientific classification
- Kingdom: Plantae
- Clade: Tracheophytes
- Clade: Angiosperms
- Clade: Eudicots
- Clade: Asterids
- Order: Ericales
- Family: Ericaceae
- Genus: Styphelia
- Species: S. filifolia

Binomial name
- Styphelia filifolia Hislop & Puente-Lel.

Species of plant

Styphelia filifolia is a species of flowering plant in the heath family Ericaceae and is endemic to the south-west of Western Australia. It is an erect shrub with erect, linear leaves, and white, tube-shaped flowers arranged singly, or in groups of up to four in leaf axils.

== Description ==
Styphelia filifolia is an erect shrub that typically grows up to 90 cm (35 in) high and 70 cm (28 in) wide, its young branchlets usually more or less glabrous. The leaves are erect, mostly linear with the edges rolled under, 12–27 mm (0.47–1.06 in) long and 0.6–2.2 mm (0.024–0.087 in) wide on a petiole 0.4–1.2 mm (0.016–0.047 in) long. Both surfaces are glabrous, the upper surface dark green and the lower surface a much lighter shade of green. The flowers are arranged singly or in groups of up to 4 in leaf axils, with egg-shaped to round bracts 0.8–1.2 mm (0.031–0.047 in) long and egg-shaped bracteoles 1.0–1.3 mm (0.039–0.051 in) long and 1.2–1.7 mm (0.047–0.067 in) long at the base. The sepals are egg-shaped or narrowly egg-shaped, 2.0–3.0 mm (0.079–0.118 in) long and 1.0–1.5 mm (0.039–0.059 in) wide, the petals white, forming a bell-shaped tube 1.7–2.5 mm (0.067–0.098 in) long with lobes 2.5–3.5 mm (0.098–0.138 in) long. Flowering mainly occurs from March to May and the fruit is an asymmetrical drupe, 4.8–8.0 mm (0.19–0.31 in) long and 4.0–6.8 mm (0.16–0.27 in) wide.

== Taxonomy ==
Styphelia filifolia was first formally described in 2017 by Michael Clyde Hislop and Caroline Puente-Lelievre in the journal Nuytsia from specimens collected by Hislop in Murdoch in 2001. The specific epithet (filifolia) means "thread-leaved", referring to the shape of the leaves.

== Distribution and habitat ==
This styphelia usually grows woodland and low-lying places, and occurs from north of Eneabba to the Harvey area, in the Geraldton Sandplains and Swan Coastal Plain bioregions of south-western Western Australia.

== Conservation status ==
Styphelia filifolia is listed as "Priority Three" by the Government of Western Australia Department of Parks and Wildlife meaning that it is poorly known and known from only a few locations but is not under imminent threat.
