= Leucopogon validus =

Conservation status
- Priority One — Poorly Known Taxa (DEC)

Scientific classification
- Kingdom: Plantae
- Clade: Tracheophytes
- Clade: Angiosperms
- Clade: Eudicots
- Clade: Asterids
- Order: Ericales
- Family: Ericaceae
- Genus: Leucopogon
- Species: L. validus

Binomial name
- Leucopogon validus Hislop & A.R.Chapm.
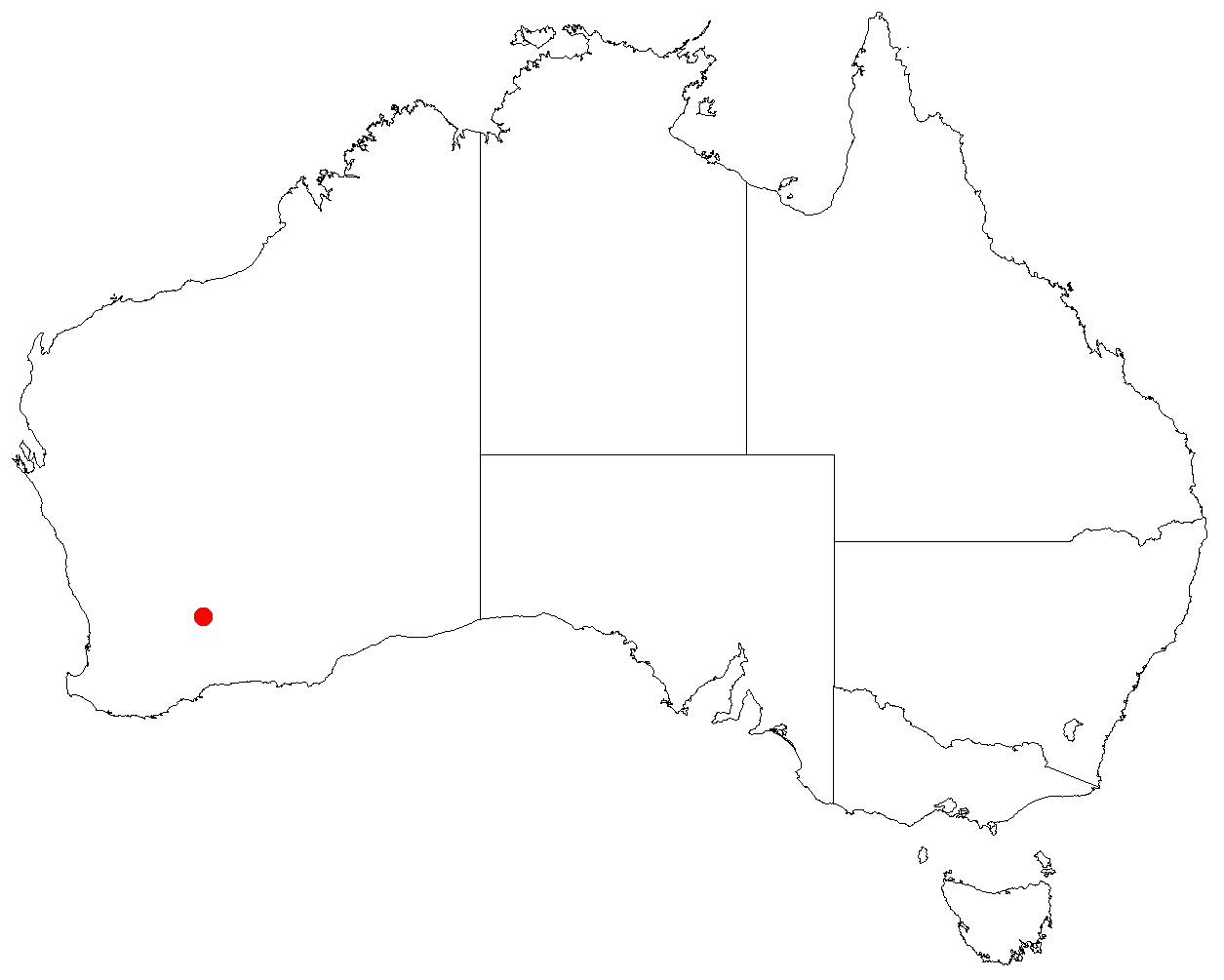
- Occurrence data from AVH

Species of plant

Leucopogon validus is a species of flowering plant in the heath family Ericaceae and is endemic to a restricted part of the south-west of Western Australia. It is a robust shrub with glabrous branchlets, narrowly elliptic leaves and white, bell-shaped flowers arranged in six to twelve upper leaf axils and on the ends of branches.

== Description ==
Leucopogon validus is a robust shrub that typically grows to about 120 cm (47 in) and wide and forms a lignotuber. Its young branchlets are light brown and glabrous, becoming grey as they age. The leaves are spirally arranged, upwards-pointing, narrowly elliptic, 9–16 mm (0.35–0.63 in) long and 2.0–3.5 mm (0.079–0.138 in) wide on a petiole 1.4–2.5 mm (0.055–0.098 in) long. The upper surface of the leaves is concave, slightly shiny and dark green, the lower surface paler. The flowers are arranged in leaf axils and on the ends of branches in groups of six to twelve 5–15 mm (0.20–0.59 in) long with broadly egg-shaped bracts 1.0–1.5 mm (0.039–0.059 in) long and bracteoles 1.8–2.2 mm (0.071–0.087 in) long. The sepals are egg-shaped, 2.5–3.4 mm (0.098–0.134 in) long and have hairy edges. The petals are white and joined at the base to form a broadly bell-shaped tube 1.6–2.0 mm (0.063–0.079 in) long and 1.7–2.2 mm (0.067–0.087 in) wide, the lobes 2.8–4.0 mm (0.11–0.16 in) long and densely bearded inside. Flowering occurs from June to September.

== Taxonomy and naming ==
Leucopogon validus was first formally described in 2007 by Michael Clyde Hislop and Alex R. Chapman in the journal Nuytsia from specimens collected in the Parker Range south-east of Southern Cross in 2003. The specific epithet (validus) means "strong" or "robust", referring to the habit and toughness of the plant.

== Distribution and habitat ==
This leucopogon is only known from the Parker Range in the Avon Wheatbelt bioregion of south-west Western Australia, where it grows in open shrubland on breakaways.

== Conservation status ==
Leucopogon validus is listed as "Priority One" by the Government of Western Australia Department of Biodiversity, Conservation and Attractions, meaning that it is known from only one or a few locations that are potentially at risk.
