= Leucopogon nitidus =

Conservation status
- Declared rare (DEC)

Scientific classification
- Kingdom: Plantae
- Clade: Tracheophytes
- Clade: Angiosperms
- Clade: Eudicots
- Clade: Asterids
- Order: Ericales
- Family: Ericaceae
- Genus: Leucopogon
- Species: L. nitidus

Binomial name
- Leucopogon nitidus Hislop
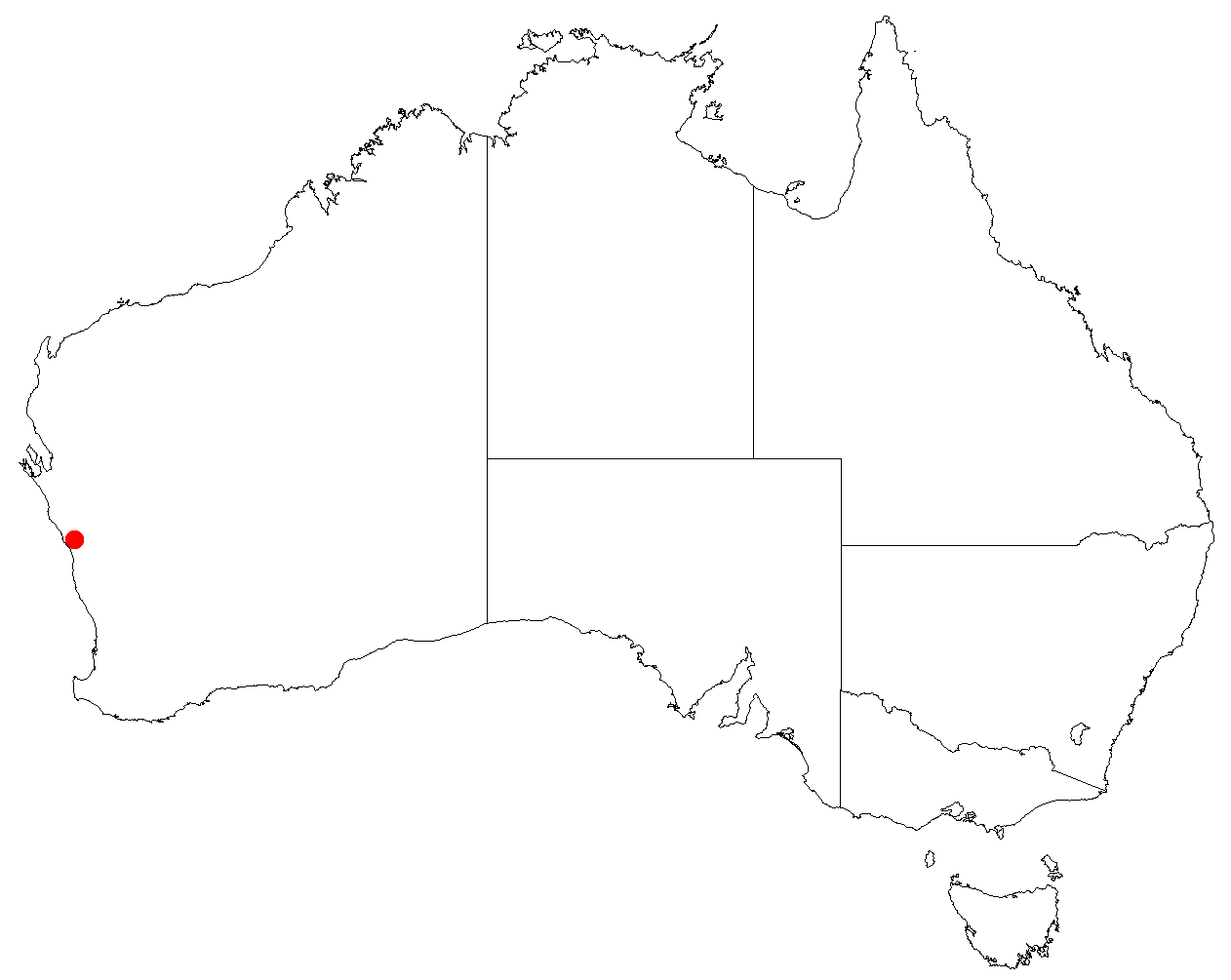
- Occurrence data from AVH

Species of plant

Leucopogon nitidus is a species of flowering plant in the heath family Ericaceae and is endemic to a small area in Western Australia. It is an erect, open shrub with hairy young branchlets, linear or very narrowly elliptic leaves and erect, compact clusters of 3 to 8 white flowers on the ends of branches and in upper leaf axils.

== Description ==
Leucopogon nitidus is an erect, open shrub that typically grows up to about 50 cm (20 in) high and wide, its young branchlets mainly covered with straight hairs. The leaves are usually spirally arranged, linear to narrowly elliptic, 3.2–8.4 mm (0.13–0.33 in) long and 0.5–0.8 mm (0.020–0.031 in) wide on an indistinct yellowish petiole 0.1–0.3 mm (0.0039–0.0118 in) long. Both surfaces of the leaves are shiny, the upper surface with a few hairs and the lower surface with two longitudinal grooves. The flowers are arranged in groups of 3 to 8 on the ends of branchlets and in upper leaf axils, with narrowly egg-shaped bracts 1.9–2.6 mm (0.075–0.102 in) long, and egg-shaped bracteoles 1.2–1.5 mm (0.047–0.059 in) long. The sepals are egg-shaped, 2.0–2.4 mm (0.079–0.094 in) long, and the petals white 2.5–2.9 mm (0.098–0.114 in) long and joined at the base to form a short tube, the lobes widely spreading and densely bearded inside. The fruit is a more or less cylindrical drupe 2.1–2.3 mm (0.083–0.091 in) long.

== Taxonomy and naming ==
Leucopogon nitidus was first formally described in 2012 by Michael Clyde Hislop in the journal Nuytsia from specimens he collected near Kojarena in 2008. The specific epithet (nitidus) means "shining" or "bright", referring to the leaves.

== Distribution and habitat ==
This leucopogon grows in heathland in shallow sandy soil occurs in a small area east of Geraldton in the Geraldton Sandplains bioregion of Western Australia.

== Conservation status ==
Leucopogon nitidus is listed as "Threatened" by the Western Australian Government Department of Biodiversity, Conservation and Attractions, meaning that it is in danger of extinction.
