= Leucopogon audax =

Conservation status
- Priority Two — Poorly Known Taxa (DEC)

Scientific classification
- Kingdom: Plantae
- Clade: Tracheophytes
- Clade: Angiosperms
- Clade: Eudicots
- Clade: Asterids
- Order: Ericales
- Family: Ericaceae
- Genus: Leucopogon
- Species: L. audax

Binomial name
- Leucopogon audax Hislop
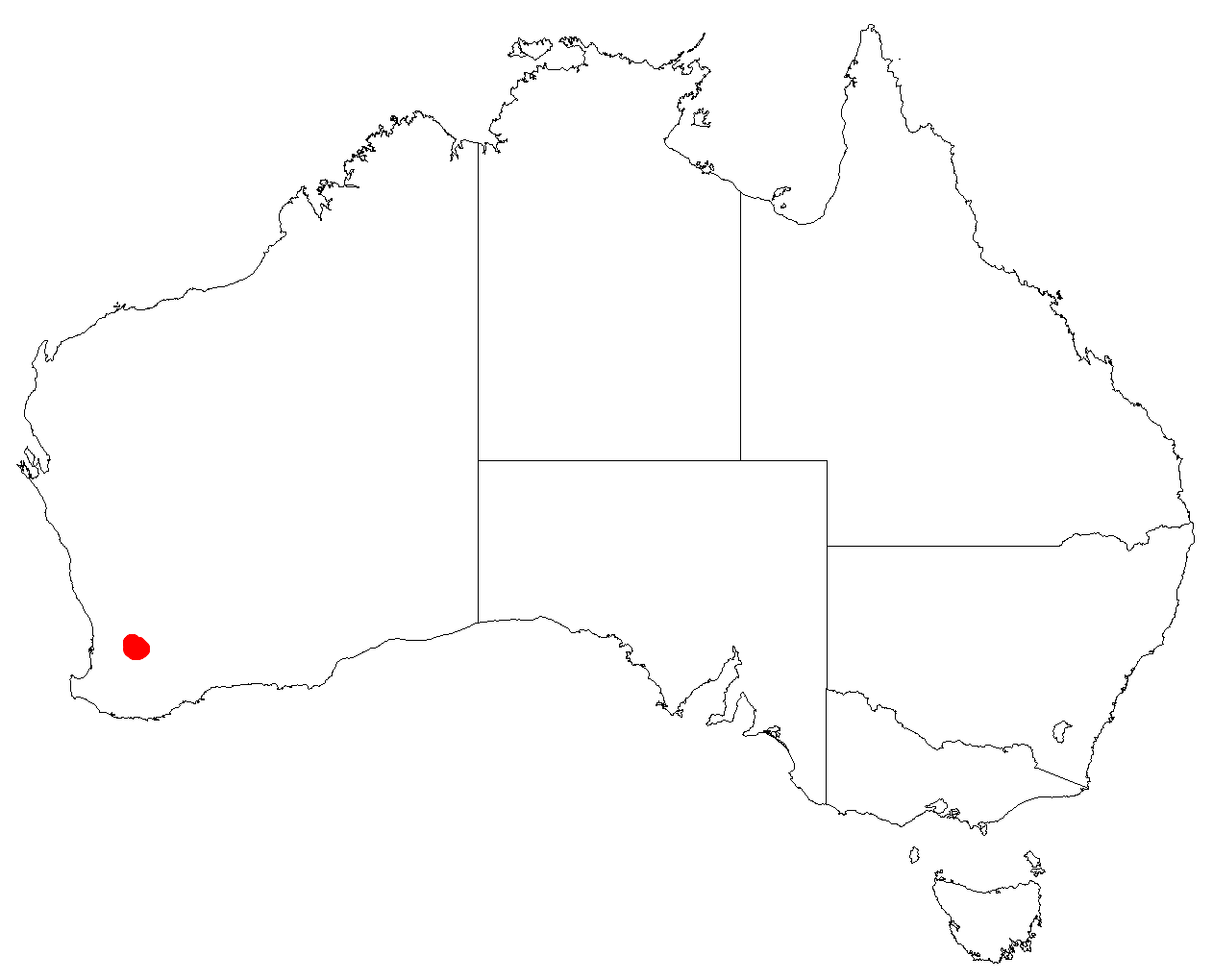
- Occurrence data from AVH

Species of plant

Leucopogon audax is a species of flowering plant in the heath family Ericaceae and is endemic to a restricted area of the south-west of Western Australia. It is an erect, open, single-stemmed shrub with hairy branchlets, egg-shaped leaves and white flowers sometimes tinged with pink, in groups in upper leaf axils or on the ends of branches.

== Description ==
Leucopogon audax is an erect, open shrub that typically grows up to about 1.5 m (4 ft 11 in) high and 1.2 m (3 ft 11 in) wide, with a single stem at the base, its young branchlets densely hairy. The leaves are directed upwards, egg-shaped or narrowly egg-shaped, 3.5–14 mm (0.14–0.55 in) long and 2.2–4.7 mm (0.087–0.185 in) wide on a petiole up to 0.7 mm (0.028 in) long. The upper surface of the leaves is concave, both surfaces usually densely hairy. The flowers are arranged in groups of three to thirteen at the ends of branchlets, or in upper leaf axils, with egg-shaped bracts 2.0–2.8 mm (0.079–0.110 in) long and similar bracteoles, the sepals egg-shaped or narrowly so, 3.0–4.0 mm (0.12–0.16 in) long, tinged with purple and hairy. The petals are white and joined at the base to form a bell-shaped tube shorter than the sepals, the lobes are white, sometimes tinged with pink, and 3.5–4.4 mm (0.14–0.17 in) long. Flowering mainly occurs from August to October and the fruit is a hairy, cylindrical drupe 3.7–4.4 mm (0.15–0.17 in) long.

== Taxonomy and naming ==
Leucopogon audax was first formally described in 2014 by Michael Clyde Hislop in the journal Nuytsia from specimens he collected east of Pingelly in 2010. The specific epithet (audax) means "bold", referring to the habit of the plant and its large flowers.

== Distribution and habitat ==
This leucopogon mainly grows in heath or open woodland in a restricted area in the Brookton-Pingelly in the Avon Wheatbelt biogeographic region of south-western Western Australia.

== Conservation status ==
Leucopogon audax is classified as "Priority Two" by the Western Australian Government Department of Biodiversity, Conservation and Attractions, meaning that it is poorly known and from only one or a few locations.
