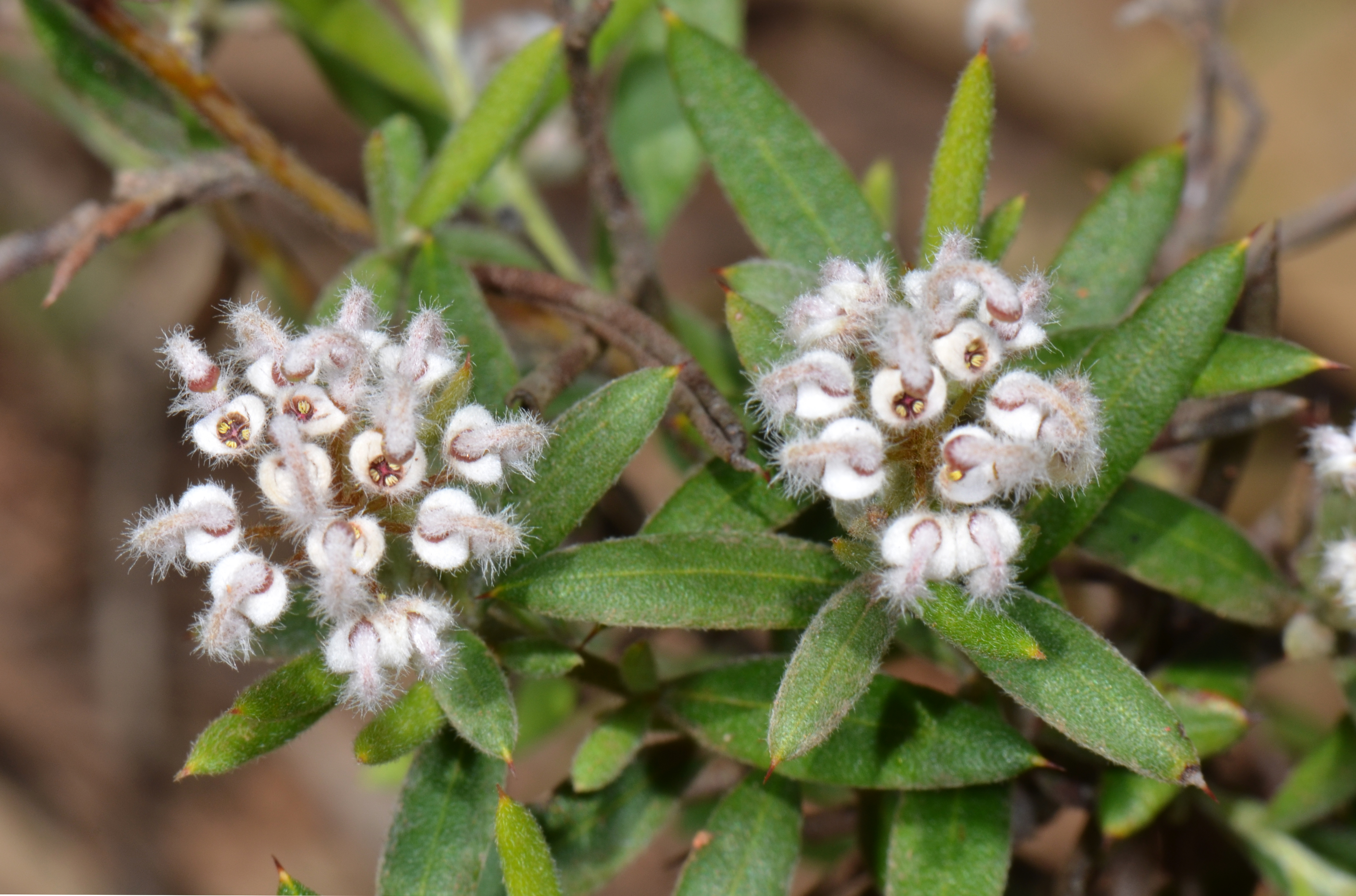

Conservation status
- Priority Two — Poorly Known Taxa (DEC)

Scientific classification
- Kingdom: Plantae
- Clade: Embryophytes
- Clade: Tracheophytes
- Clade: Angiosperms
- Clade: Eudicots
- Order: Proteales
- Family: Proteaceae
- Genus: Grevillea
- Species: G. hislopii

Binomial name
- Grevillea hislopii Olde & Marriott

= Grevillea hislopii =

Species of shrub endemic to Western Australia

Grevillea hislopii is a species of flowering plant in the family Proteaceae and is endemic to a restricted area of the south-west of Western Australia. It is a dense, single-stemmed shrub with linear to narrow elliptic leaves and clusters of hairy, whitish-grey flowers.

== Description ==
Grevillea hislopii is a dense, single-stemmed shrub that typically grows to up to 1.4 m (4 ft 7 in) high and 1.2 m (3 ft 11 in) wide. Its adult leaves are linear to narrowly elliptic, 10–30 mm (0.39–1.18 in) long and 1.2–6 mm (0.047–0.236 in) wide on a petiole up to 1 mm (0.039 in) long and with a small point up to 1.5 mm (0.059 in) long on the tip. The lower surface of the leaves is densely hairy. The flowers are arranged in leaf axils or on the ends of branchlets in clusters on a rachis 0.5–1 mm (0.020–0.039 in) long, each flower on a pedicel 1.5–2.5 mm (0.059–0.098 in) long. The flowers are greyish-white, hairy and slightly rust-coloured, the style white and slightly pink with a green tip, the pistil 6 mm (0.24 in) long. Flowering occurs in spring and the fruit is an oval follicle 7.5–12 mm (0.30–0.47 in) long.

== Taxonomy ==
Grevillea hislopii was first formally described in 2008 by Peter M. Olde and Neil R. Marriott in the journal Nuytsia from specimens they collected near Perth in 2002. The specific epithet (hislopii) honours Michael Clyde Hislop.

== Distribution and habitat ==
This grevillea grows in open woodland near creeks and drainage lines in a small area west of York in the Jarrah Forest bioregion of south-western Western Australia.

== Conservation status ==
Grevillea hislopii is listed as 'Priority Two' by the Western Australian Government Department of Biodiversity, Conservation and Attractions, meaning that it is poorly known and from only one or a few locations.

== See also ==
- List of Grevillea species
