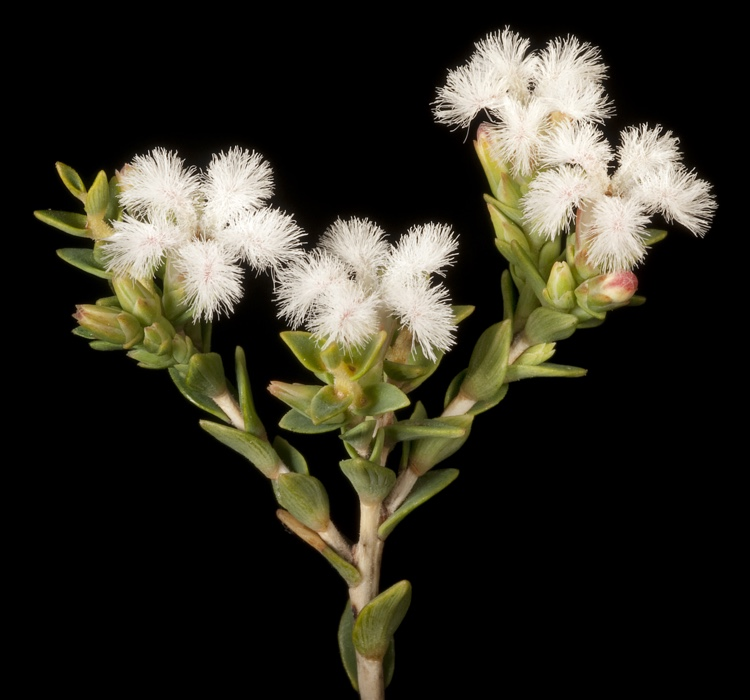

Scientific classification
- Kingdom: Plantae
- Clade: Tracheophytes
- Clade: Angiosperms
- Clade: Eudicots
- Clade: Asterids
- Order: Ericales
- Family: Ericaceae
- Genus: Leucopogon
- Species: L. inflexus

Binomial name
- Leucopogon inflexus Hislop
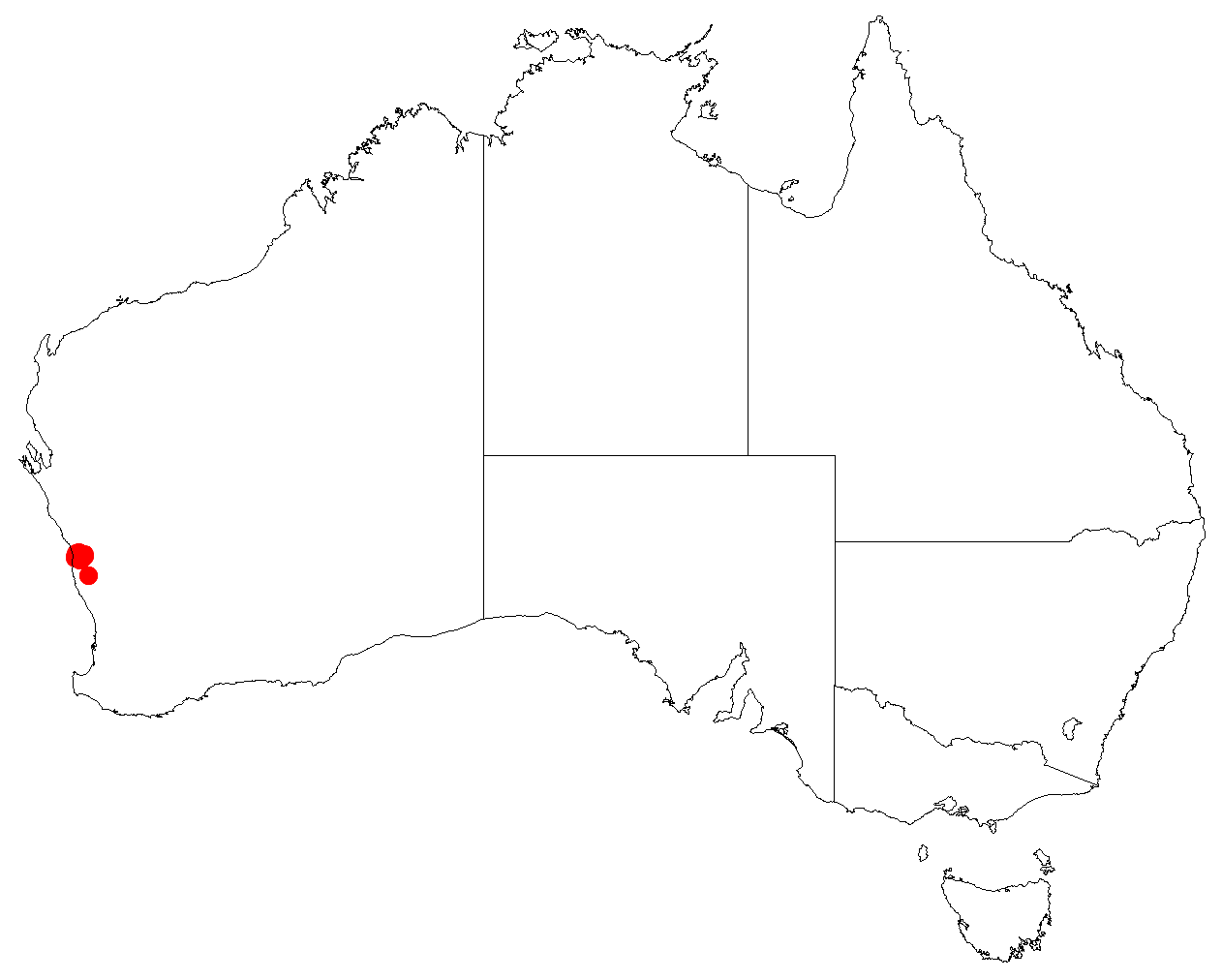
- Occurrence data from AVH

= Leucopogon inflexus =

Species of flowering plant

Leucopogon inflexus is a species of flowering plant in the heath family Ericaceae and is endemic to the south-west of Western Australia. It is an erect, open shrub with more or less glabrous young branchlets, spirally arranged, erect, egg-shaped to more or less round leaves, and white, bell-shaped, densely bearded flowers.

== Description ==
Leucopogon inflexus is an erect, open shrub that typically grows up to about 80 cm (31 in) high and 60 cm (24 in) wide, usually with a single stem at the base, its young branchlets more or less glabrous. The leaves are spirally arranged and point upwards, egg-shaped to more or less round, 1.2–3.3 mm (0.047–0.130 in) long, 1.2–3.8 mm (0.047–0.150 in) wide and more or less sessile or on a petiole up to 0.5 mm (0.020 in) long. The flowers are arranged singly or in groups of up to 3 on the ends of branches or short side branchlets, with leaf-like bracts and egg-shaped bracteoles 1.5–2.0 mm (0.059–0.079 in) long and 0.9–1.1 mm (0.035–0.043 in) wide. The flowers are erect, the sepals narrowly egg-shaped, 2.2–3.0 mm (0.087–0.118 in) long and often tinged with purple, the petals white and joined at the base to form a bell-shaped tube 1.3–1.8 mm (0.051–0.071 in) long, the lobes 2.0–2.5 mm (0.079–0.098 in) long, densely bearded, and sometimes flushed with pink. Flowering in many months and the fruit is a narrowly elliptic drupe 2.2–2.7 mm (0.087–0.106 in) long.

== Taxonomy ==
Leucopogon inflexus was first formally described in 2016 by Michael Hislop in the journal Nuytsia from specimens collected near Eneabba in 2006. The specific epithet (inflexus) means "bent backwards", referring to the leaf tips of dried specimens.

== Distribution and habitat ==
This leucopogon grows in heath and low woodland between Dongara, Eneabba and the Arrino district in the Geraldton Sandplains bioregion of south-western Western Australia.

== Conservation status ==
Leucopogon inflexus is listed as "not threatened" by the Government of Western Australia Department of Biodiversity, Conservation and Attractions.
