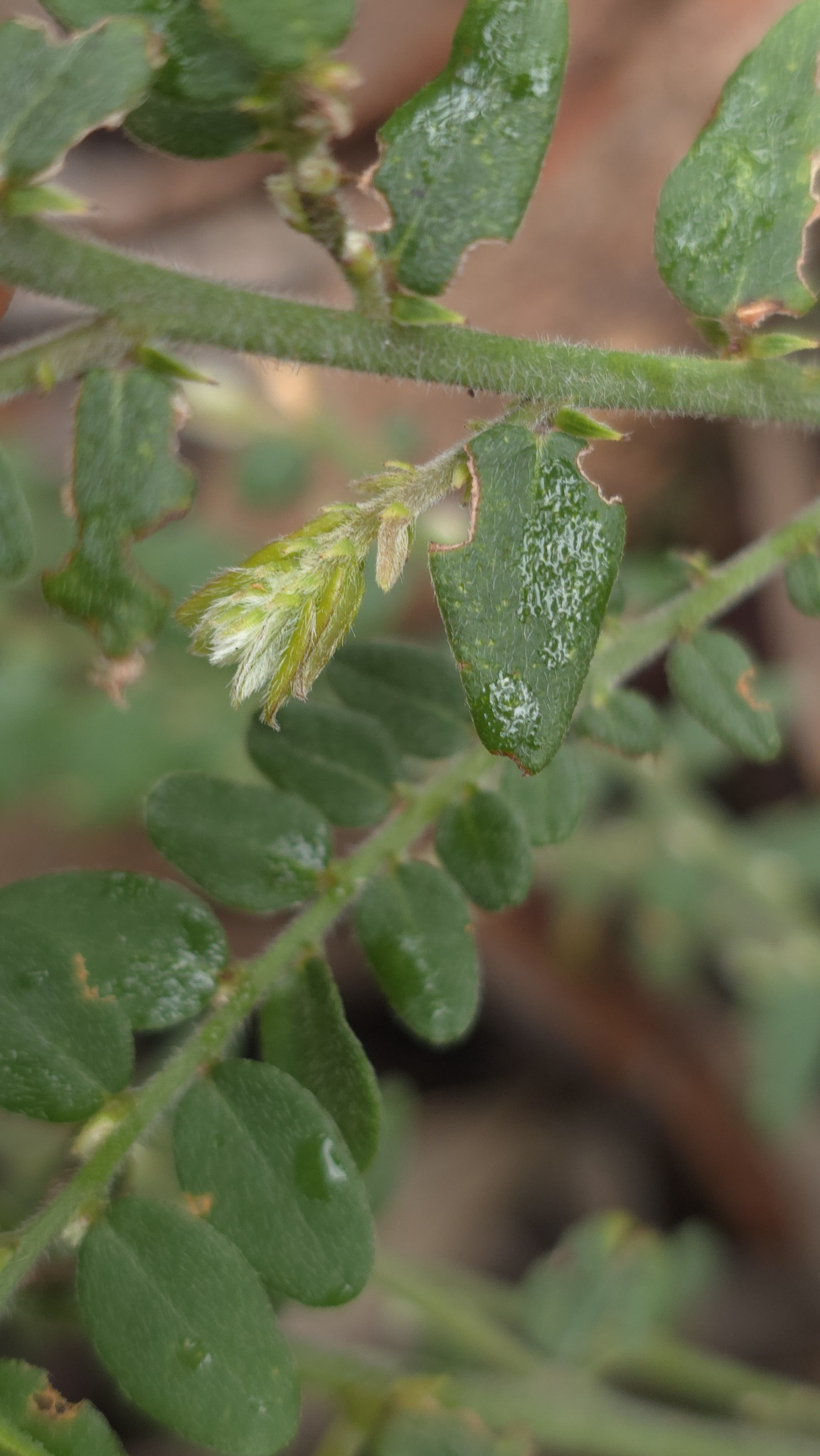

Scientific classification
- Kingdom: Plantae
- Clade: Tracheophytes
- Clade: Angiosperms
- Clade: Eudicots
- Clade: Asterids
- Order: Ericales
- Family: Ericaceae
- Genus: Leucopogon
- Species: L. hirsutus

Binomial name
- Leucopogon hirsutus Sond.
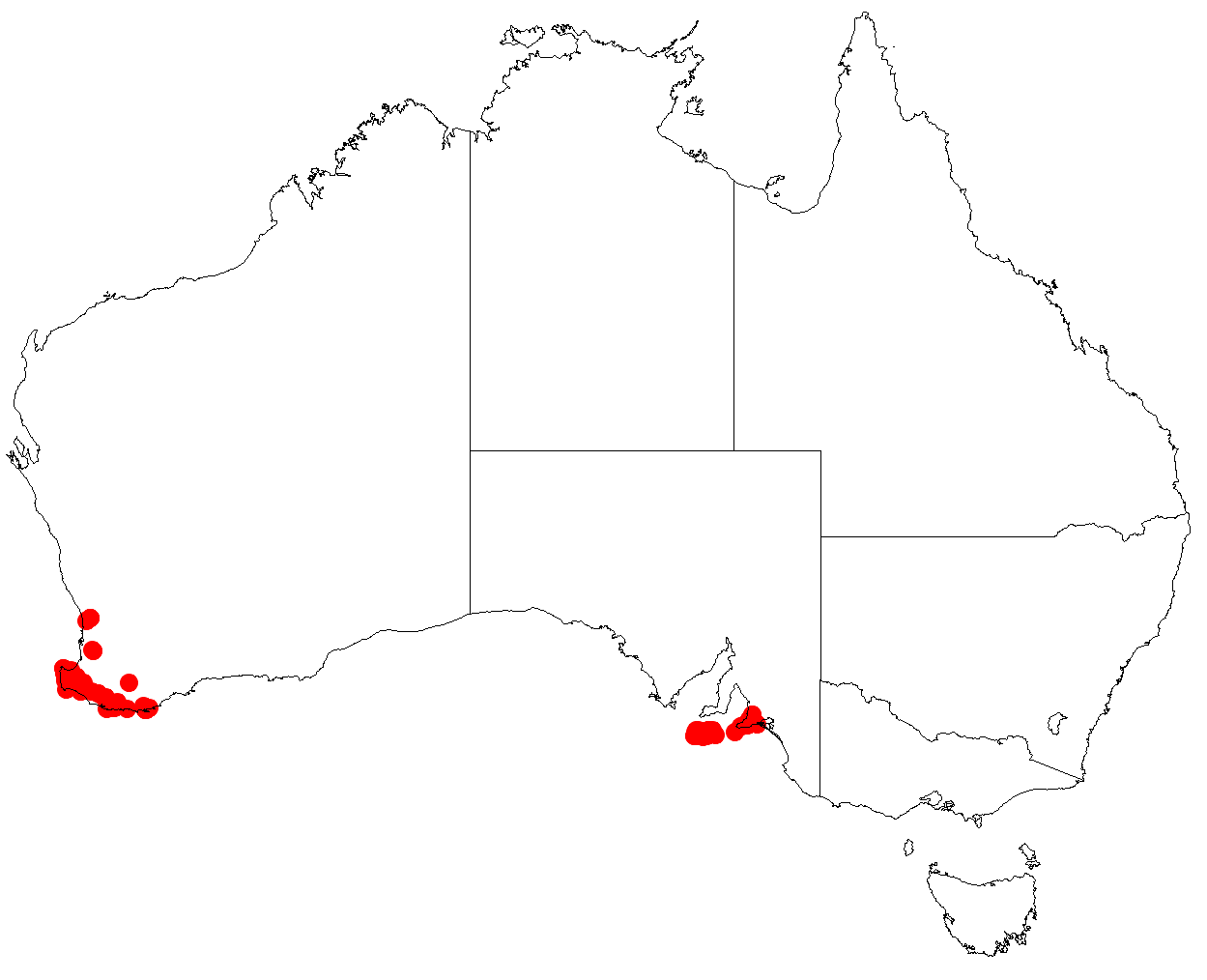
- Occurrence data from AVH

Synonyms
- Styphelia hirsuta (Sond.) F.Muell.

= Leucopogon hirsutus =

Species of plant

Leucopogon hirsutus is a species of flowering plant in the heath family Ericaceae and is endemic to southern continental Australia. It is a low-lying or straggling shrub with elliptic to oblong leaves and inconspicuous, white, bell-shaped flowers.

== Description ==
Leucopogon hirsutus is a low-lying or straggling shrub that typically grows to 5–75 cm (2.0–29.5 in) and has intertwining branches. Its leaves are elliptic to oblong, 3–9.5 mm (0.12–0.37 in) long and 1.5–3.9 mm (0.059–0.154 in) wide on a petiole up to 1.2 mm (0.047 in) long. The flowers are inconspicuous and drooping, arranged singly or in groups of 2 to 6 in upper leaf axils and on the ends of the branches with bracts 0.65–1.3 mm (0.026–0.051 in) long and bracteoles 0.7–1 mm (0.028–0.039 in) long and 0.4–0.9 mm (0.016–0.035 in) wide. The sepals are 1.0–1.5 mm (0.039–0.059 in) long, the petals forming a broadly bell-shaped tube 0.5–0.7 mm (0.020–0.028 in) long with lobes 1.0–1.4 mm (0.039–0.055 in) long and curved backwards. Flowering occurs from August to October and the fruit is a drupe 1.8–2.2 mm (0.071–0.087 in) long.

== Taxonomy and naming ==
Leucopogon hirsutus was first formally described in 1845 by Otto Wilhelm Sonder in Johann Georg Christian Lehmann's Plantae Preissianae. The specific epithet (hirsutus) means "hirsute", referring to the stems and leaves.

== Distribution and habitat ==
This leucopogon occurs in swampy places and on the edge of creeks in the Avon Wheatbelt, Jarrah Forest, Swan Coastal Plain, and Warren bioregions of south-western Western Australia and the southern Mount Lofty Ranges and Kangaroo Island of South Australia.

== Conservation status ==
Leucopogon hirsutus is listed as "not threatened" by the Government of Western Australia Department of Biodiversity, Conservation and Attractions.
