= Michael Clyde Hislop =

Australian botanist

Michael Clyde Hislop (born 1955) is an Australian botanist based in Perth at the Western Australian Herbarium.

== Career ==
Hislop specialises in the curation, identification and taxonomy of plants, particularly the genus Styphelia which he recircumscribed with two other researchers. He has also helped to identify and name numerous species found in the Pilbara, Goldfields and South-West of Western Australia.

Grevillea hislopii was named in his honour.
