= Leucopogon stokesii =

Conservation status
- Declared rare (DEC)

Scientific classification
- Kingdom: Plantae
- Clade: Tracheophytes
- Clade: Angiosperms
- Clade: Eudicots
- Clade: Asterids
- Order: Ericales
- Family: Ericaceae
- Genus: Leucopogon
- Species: L. stokesii

Binomial name
- Leucopogon stokesii Hislop
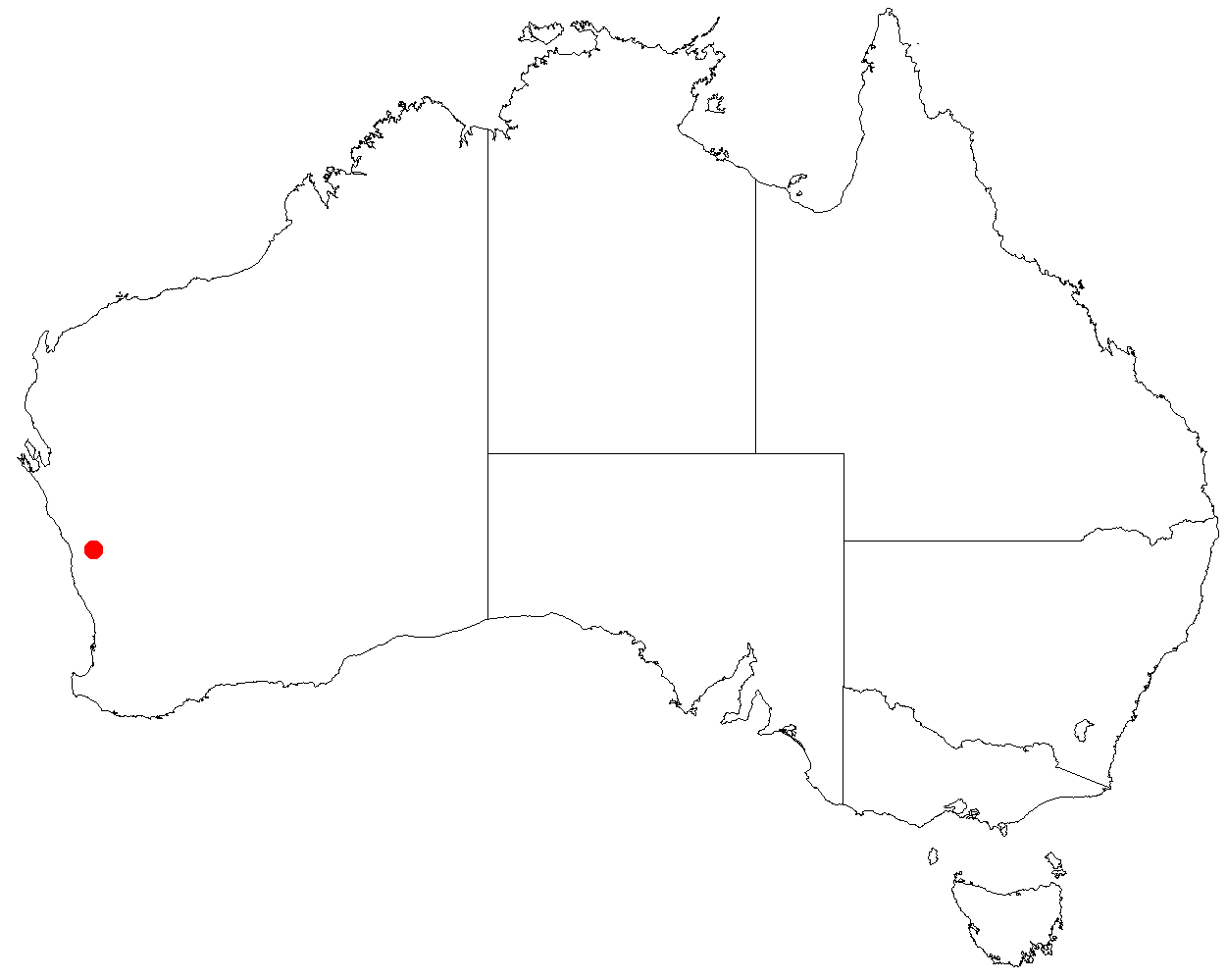
- Occurrence data from AVH

Species of plant

Leucopogon stokesii is a species of flowering plant in the heath family Ericaceae and is endemic to a small area in the south-west of Western Australia. It is an erect, open shrub with hairy young branchlets, narrowly elliptic leaves and erect, dense clusters of 5 to 10 bell-shaped white flowers on the ends of branches.

== Description ==
Leucopogon stokesii is an erect, open shrub that typically grows up to about 1.6 m (5 ft 3 in) high and 1.5 m (4 ft 11 in) wide, its young branchlets mainly covered with straight hairs. The leaves are spirally arranged, narrowly elliptic, 3.2–7.2 mm (0.13–0.28 in) long and 0.8–1.8 mm (0.031–0.071 in) wide on a creamy yellow to pale brown petiole 0.4–1.1 mm (0.016–0.043 in) long. Both surfaces of the leaves are glabrous, the upper surface glaucous and the lower surface darker and shiny. The flowers are arranged in groups of 5 to 10 on the ends of branchlets with narrowly egg-shaped bracts 1.4–3.1 mm (0.055–0.122 in) long, and egg-shaped bracteoles 1.2–1.5 mm (0.047–0.059 in) long. The sepals are egg-shaped, 2.0–2.9 mm (0.079–0.114 in) long, and the petals white and joined at the base to form a bell-shaped tube 1.3–1.8 mm (0.051–0.071 in) long, the lobes 2.4–3.0 mm (0.094–0.118 in) long, usually flushed with pink, widely spreading and densely bearded inside. The fruit is an oblong or elliptic drupe 1.8–2.5 mm (0.071–0.098 in) long.

== Taxonomy and naming ==
Leucopogon stokesii was first formally described in 2012 by Michael Clyde Hislop in the journal Nuytsia from specimens collected near Arrino in 2009. The specific epithet (stokesii) honours Dennis Stokes, on whose property this species occurs.

== Distribution and habitat ==
This leucopogon grows in dense heath on and near breakaways in a small area near Three Springs in the Avon Wheatbelt bioregion in the south-west of Western Australia.

== Conservation status ==
Leucopogon stokesii is listed as "Threatened" by the Western Australian Government Department of Biodiversity, Conservation and Attractions, meaning that it is in danger of extinction.
