= Leucopogon grammatus =

Conservation status
- Priority Three — Poorly Known Taxa (DEC)

Scientific classification
- Kingdom: Plantae
- Clade: Tracheophytes
- Clade: Angiosperms
- Clade: Eudicots
- Clade: Asterids
- Order: Ericales
- Family: Ericaceae
- Genus: Leucopogon
- Species: L. grammatus

Binomial name
- Leucopogon grammatus Hislop
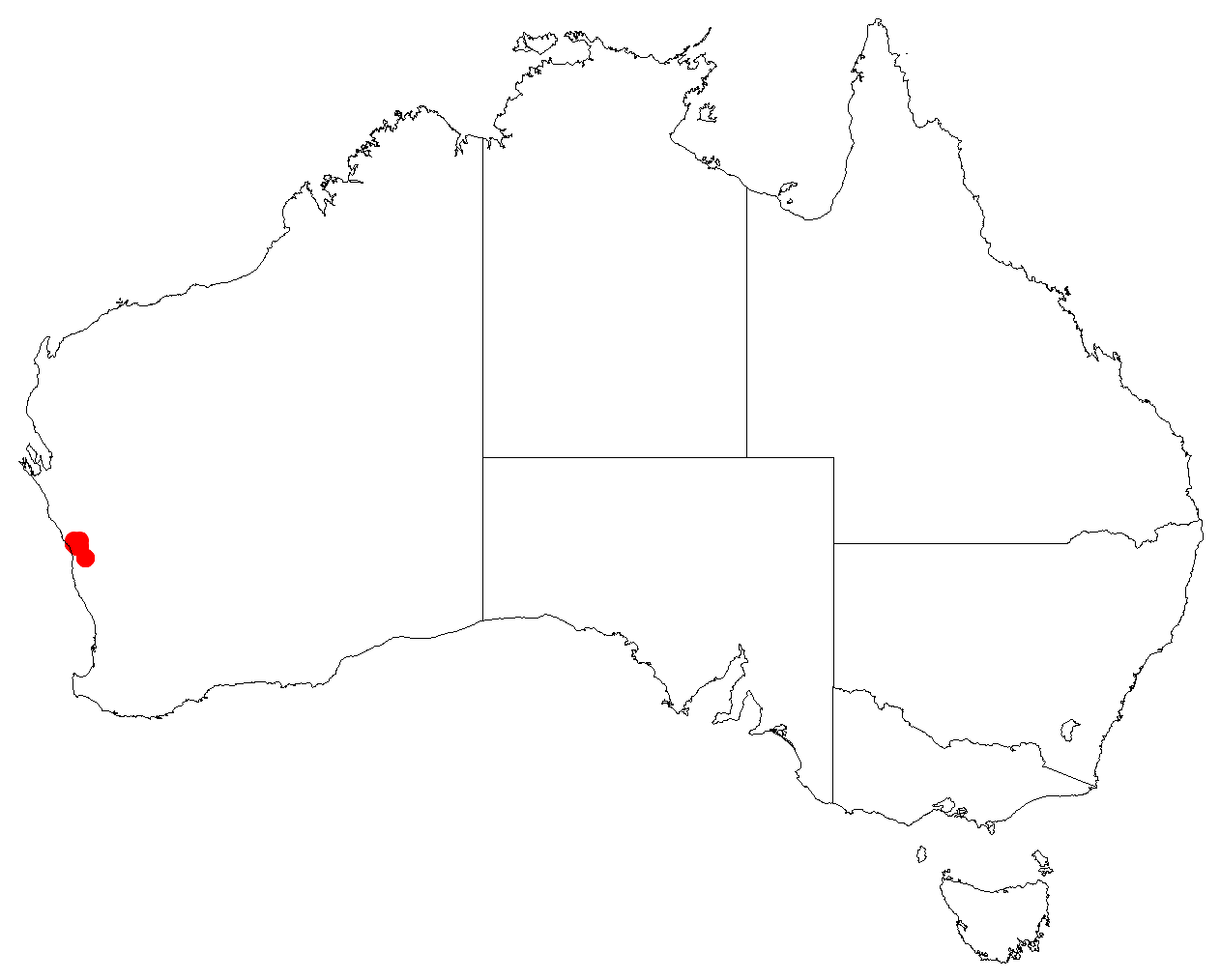
- Occurrence data from AVH

Species of flowering plant

Leucopogon grammatus is a species of flowering plant in the heath family Ericaceae and is endemic to the south-west of Western Australia. It is an erect shrub with hairy young branchlets, spirally arranged, erect, egg-shaped leaves, and white, bell-shaped to broadly bell-shaped flowers.

== Description ==
Leucopogon grammatus is an erect shrub that typically grows up to about 100 cm (39 in) high and 80 cm (31 in) wide, usually with a single stem at the base, its young branchlets densely covered with curly hairs. The leaves are spirally arranged and point upwards to pressed against the stem, egg-shaped to narrowly egg-shaped, 1.2–3.2 mm (0.047–0.126 in) long and 0.6–1.5 mm (0.024–0.059 in) wide on a short, indistinct petiole. The flowers are arranged in groups of 3 to 15, 2.5–7 mm (0.098–0.276 in) long mostly on the ends of branches, with leaf-like bracts and egg-shaped bracteoles 1.3–2.1 mm (0.051–0.083 in) long and 0.7–1.2 mm (0.028–0.047 in) wide. The flowers are erect, the sepals egg-shaped, 1.8–2.5 mm (0.071–0.098 in) long and sometimes tinged with pink, the petals white and joined at the base to form a bell-shaped to narrowly bell-shaped tube 0.9–1.4 mm (0.035–0.055 in) long, the lobes 2.1–2.8 mm (0.083–0.110 in) long. Flowering mainly occurs from June to August and the fruit is a narrowly elliptic drupe 1.7–2.3 mm (0.067–0.091 in) long.

== Taxonomy ==
Leucopogon grammatus was first formally described in 2016 by Michael Hislop in the journal Nuytsia from specimens he collected near Three Springs in 2006. The specific epithet (grammatus) means "striped with raised lines", referring to the lower leaf surface.

== Distribution and habitat ==
This leucopogon grows in low heath between Walkaway and the Arrino district in the Geraldton Sandplains bioregion of south-western Western Australia.

== Conservation status ==
Leucopogon grammatus is listed as "Priority Three" by the Government of Western Australia Department of Biodiversity, Conservation and Attractions, meaning that it is poorly known and known from only a few locations but is not under imminent threat.
