= List of heritage places in the Shire of Three Springs =

List of heritage sites in Western Australia

As of 2026, 47 places are heritage-listed in the Shire of Three Springs, of which one is on the State Register of Heritage Places, which is maintained by the Heritage Council of Western Australia.

== List ==
=== State Register of Heritage Places ===
The Western Australian State Register of Heritage Places, as of 2026, lists the following state registered place within the Shire of Three Springs:

| Place name | Place # | Street name | Suburb or town | Co-ordinates | Built | State registered | Notes & former names | Photo |
|---|---|---|---|---|---|---|---|---|
| Duffy's Store & Billiard Saloon (former) | 5261 | The Midlands Road | Three Springs | 29.534296°S 115.762536°E | 1910 | 24 March 2005 | Ryan's Store (former) | |

=== Shire of Three Springs heritage-listed places ===
The following places are heritage listed in the Shire of Three Springs but are not State registered:

| Place name | Place # | Street # | Street name | Suburb or town | Notes & former names | Photo |
|---|---|---|---|---|---|---|
| ES & A Bank & Quarters (former) | 2555 | | Railway Road | Three Springs | English, Scottish and Australian Bank Ltd | |
| Old Shops | 2556 | | Railway Road | Three Springs | | |
| Commercial Hotel | 2557 | Corner | Railway Road & Station Street | Three Springs | | |
| Three Springs Shire Office | 5256 | | Railway Road | Three Springs | | |
| Three Springs Shire Hall | 5257 | Corner | Railway Road & Hall Street | Three Springs | Three Springs Tourist and Promotional Centre | |
| Three Springs General Store | 5258 | Corner | Railway Road & Maley Street | Three Springs | North Midlands Farmers' Co-operative Store | |
| Three Springs Post Office | 5259 | Corner | Railway Road & Maley Street | Three Springs | | |
| Shop | 5260 | | Railway Road | Three Springs | Drapery and Pharmacy (former) | |
| National Bank Building | 5262 | | Railway Road | Three Springs | | |
| Supermarket | 5263 | | Railway Road | Three Springs | B&G Store | |
| Sweetman's Garage | 5264 | Corner | Thomas Street & Railway Road | Three Springs | | |
| Three Springs War Memorial | 5265 | | Railway Road Opp Maley Street | Three Springs | | |
| Community Recreation Centre | 5266 | | Hall Street | Three Springs | | |
| Three Springs Olympic Pool | 5267 | North West Corner | Hall & Mayrhofer Streets | Three Springs | | |
| Three Springs Anglican Methodist Church (former) | 5268 | | Carter Street | Three Springs | Three Springs Anglican Uniting Church, Trinity Church | |
| St Paul's Catholic Church, Presbytery & School | 5269 | Corner | Touche & Williamson Streets | Three Springs | | |
| Dudawa Water Reserve | 5270 | | | Dudawa | | |
| Lady Brand Lodge | 5272 | | Carter Street | Three Springs | | |
| Nurses Quarters (former) | 5274 | Corner | Carter & Thomas Streets | Three Springs | | |
| North Midlands District Hospital | 5275 | | Thomas Street | Three Springs | | |
| Child Health Centre | 5276 | | Mayrhofer Street | Three Springs | | |
| Three Springs Primary School | 5277 | | Carter Street | Three Springs | Kadathinni School | |
| CBH Silos | 5278 | | Slaughter Street | Three Springs | Co-operative Bulk Handling Silos | |
| Kia-Ora | 5279 | 47 | Railway Road | Three Springs | | |
| Residence (Shire Residence) | 5280 | 37 | Carter Street | Three Springs | | |
| Residence | 5281 | Corner | Glyde Road & Slaughter Street | Three Springs | | |
| Residence | 5282 | 41 | Slaughter Street | Three Springs | | |
| Residence | 5283 | 51 | Williamson Street | Three Springs | | |
| Residence | 5284 | 81 | Williamson Street | Three Springs | | |
| The Oaks | 5285 | | Three Springs-Morawa Road | Three Springs | | |
| Caldow's House | 5286 | | Three Springs-Morawa Road | Three Springs | | |
| Well Site | 5287 | | Three Springs-Morawa Road | Three Springs | | |
| Three Springs Talc Mine | 5288 | | Three Springs-Perenjori Road | Three Springs | | |
| Three Springs Cemetery | 5289 | | Three Springs-Perenjori Road | Three Springs | | |
| Parakalia | 5290 | | Three Springs-Eneabba Road | Three Springs | | |
| Earra Homestead | 5291 | | Midlands Road | Three Springs | | |
| Arrino Townsite (Site) | 5292 | | Midlands Road | Arrino | | |
| Arrino Silos | 5293 | | Midlands Road | Arrino | | |
| Arrino General Store | 5294 | | Midlands Road | Arrino Townsite | | |
| Dudawa School & Quarters | 5296 | | Dudawa Road | Dudawa | Dudawa School & Water Reserve | |
| Three Springs Veterinary Centre | 10887 | Corner | Carter & Thomas Streets | Three Springs | | |
| Yarra Yarra Lakes Railway Bridge | 15605 | | Millendon-Narngulu Railway South of | Three Springs | | |
| Three Springs Police Station | 17333 | | Carter & Maley Streets | Three Springs | | |
| St Paul's Catholic Church | 24411 | Corner | Touche Street & Williamson Street | Three Springs | | |
| St Paul's School | 24443 | | Touche Street | Three Springs | | |
| Catholic Presbytery | 24514 | | Williamson Street | Three Springs | | |
