= Luzenac Group =

The Luzenac Group is a talc mining company headquartered in Neuilly sur Seine, France. The company is the world's largest producer of talc, with mines and processing plants located in Europe, North America, Australia, and East Asia. The Luzenac Group was a wholly owned subsidiary of the Rio Tinto Group from 1988 until August 2011, when it was sold to Imerys.

== Mines ==
- Three Springs Mine - Three Springs, Western Australia
