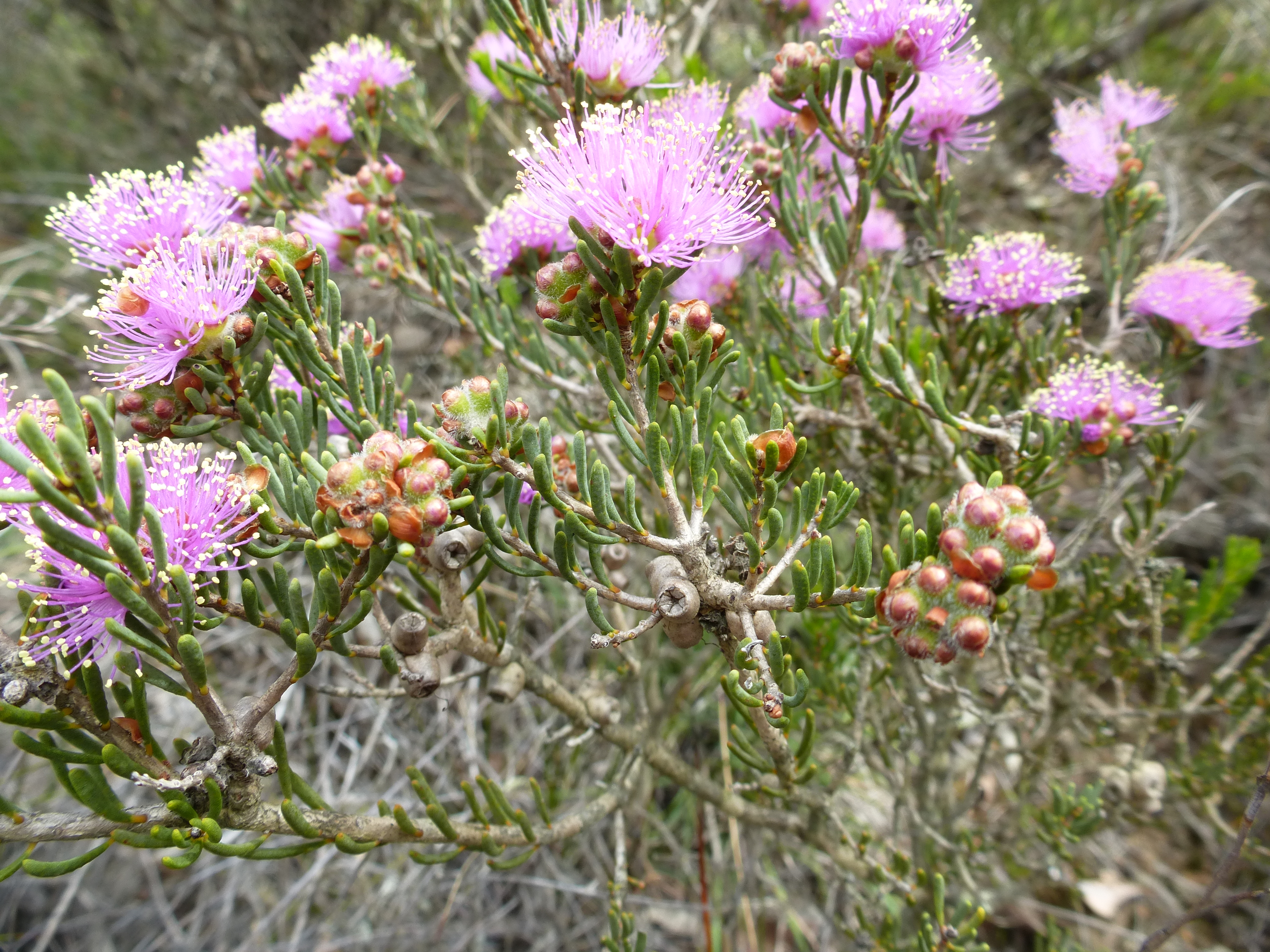

Scientific classification
- Kingdom: Plantae
- Clade: Tracheophytes
- Clade: Angiosperms
- Clade: Eudicots
- Clade: Rosids
- Order: Myrtales
- Family: Myrtaceae
- Genus: Melaleuca
- Species: M. carrii

Binomial name
- Melaleuca carrii Craven

= Melaleuca carrii =

Species of shrub

Melaleuca carrii is a plant in the myrtle family, Myrtaceae and is endemic to the south-west of Western Australia. It is a small shrub similar to Melaleuca pentagona, with "pom-pom" heads of pinkish flowers and sharply pointed leaves but it is generally smaller, lacks a groove in its leaves and retains its petals on the flowers for longer than that species.

== Description ==
Melaleuca carrii is a small shrub growing to a height of 2 m (7 ft) with bark that is fibrous and grooved. Its leaves are arranged alternately, 6.5–27 mm (0.3–1 in) long and usually 0.6–1.1 mm (0.02–0.04 in) wide, usually glabrous, cylinder-shaped and tapering to a point.

The flowers are a shade of pink to purple and are arranged in heads on the ends of branches which continue to grow after flowering, sometimes also in the upper leaf axils. The heads are up to 18 mm (0.7 in) in diameter and contain 5 to 12 groups of flowers in threes. The petals are 0.7–1.5 mm (0.03–0.06 in) long and fall off as the flower ages. The stamens are arranged in bundles of five around the flower, usually with 4 to 6 stamens in each bundle. The flowering season is mainly in spring but has been recorded as early as April. The fruit are woody capsules, 2–3 mm (0.08–0.1 in) long forming roughly spherical clusters around the stem.

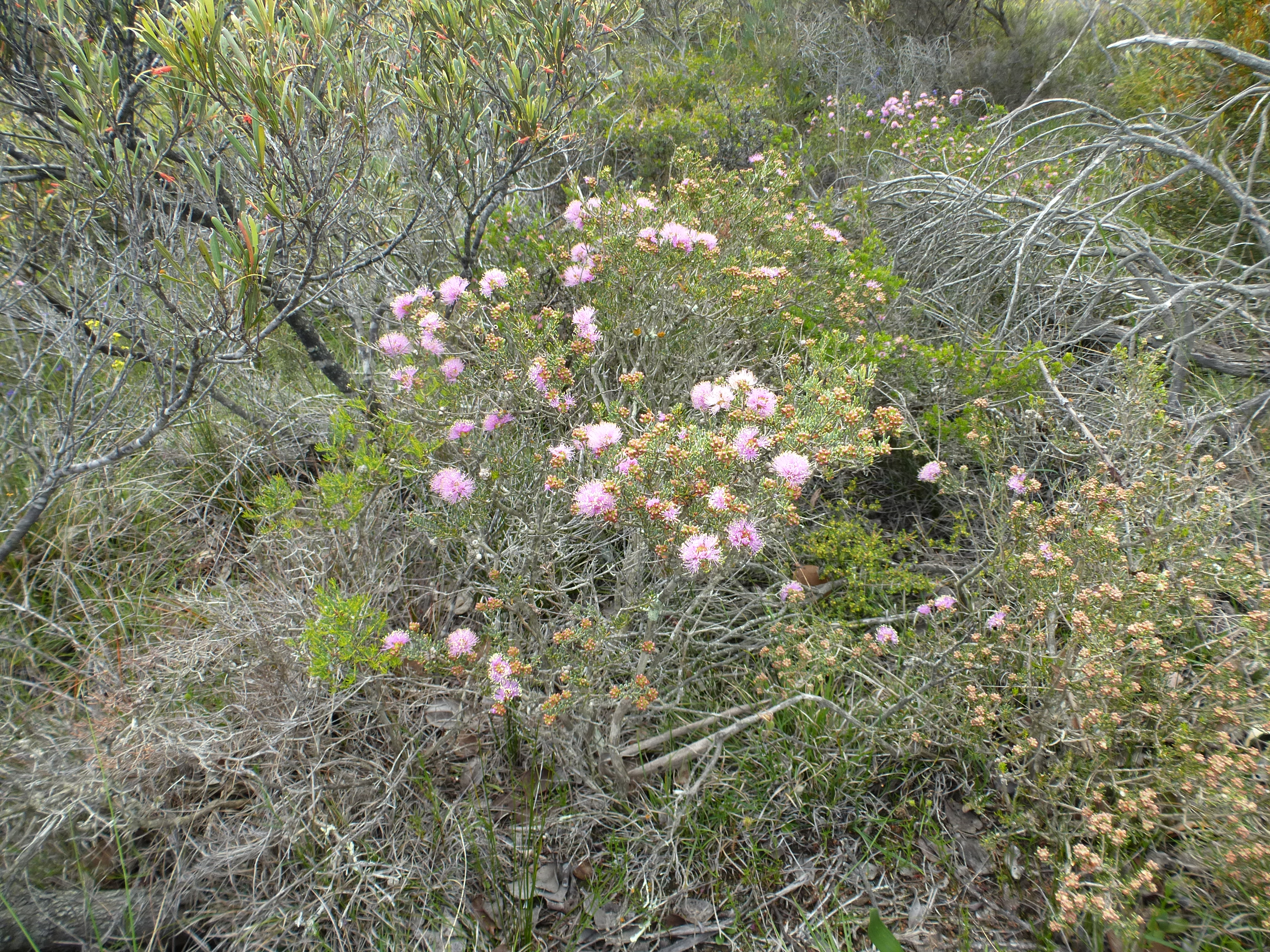
Habit about 90km west of Esperance

== Taxonomy and naming ==
Melaleuca carrii was first formally described in 1999 by Lyndley Craven and Brendan Lepschi in Australian Systematic Botany from a specimen found east of Newdegate. The specific epithet (carrii) honours Denis John Carr, a botanist at the Australian National University.

== Distribution and habitat ==
This melaleuca occurs in and between the Eneabba, Three Springs, Jerramungup and Esperance districts in the Avon Wheatbelt, Coolgardie, Esperance Plains, Geraldton Sandplains, Jarrah Forest, Mallee and Swan Coastal Plain biogeographic regions. It grows in heath, shrub and woodland on sand, loam and clay over granite, often on the edge of swampy areas. It also occurs along railway lines

== Conservation status ==
Melaleuca carrii is listed as not threatened by the Government of Western Australia Department of Parks and Wildlife.
