= Grevillea makinsonii =

Conservation status
- Vulnerable (IUCN 3.1)

- Priority Three — Poorly Known Taxa (DEC)

Scientific classification
- Kingdom: Plantae
- Clade: Embryophytes
- Clade: Tracheophytes
- Clade: Angiosperms
- Clade: Eudicots
- Order: Proteales
- Family: Proteaceae
- Genus: Grevillea
- Species: G. makinsonii

Binomial name
- Grevillea makinsonii McGill.

Species of shrub endemic to Western Australia

Grevillea makinsonii is a species of flowering plant in the family Proteaceae and is endemic to the south-west of Western Australia. It is an erect shrub with egg-shaped to more or less spatula-shaped leaves, and clusters of cream-coloured to pale yellow flowers.

== Description ==
Grevillea makinsonii is an erect shrub that typically grows to a height of 0.6–1.6 m (2 ft 0 in – 5 ft 3 in) high. The leaves are egg-shaped with the narrower end towards the base to more or less spatula-shaped, 10–30 mm (0.39–1.18 in) long and 3–8 mm (0.12–0.31 in) wide. The flowers are arranged in conical clusters 30–60 mm (1.2–2.4 in) long and are glabrous and cream-coloured to pale yellow, the pistil 5.5–6 mm (0.22–0.24 in) long. Flowering occurs from July to October, and the fruit is a wrinkled, oval follicle about 6 mm (0.24 in) long.

== Taxonomy ==
Grevillea makinsonii was first formally described in 1986 by Donald McGillivray in his book New Names in Grevillea (Proteaceae) from specimens collected near Arrino in 1969. The specific epithet (makinsonii) honours Robert Owen Makinson.

== Distribution and habitat ==
This grevillea grows in heath on sandplains in the area around Arrino, Three Springs and Eneabba in the Avon Wheatbelt, Geraldton Sandplains bioregions of south-western Western Australia.

== Conservation status ==
Grevillea makinsonii is listed as priority three by the Government of Western Australia Department of Biodiversity, Conservation and Attractions, meaning that it is poorly known and known from only a few locations but is not under imminent threat.

== See also ==
- List of Grevillea species
