= Arrowsmith River =

River in Western Australia

Coordinates: 29°36′6″S 115°6′55″E

Location
- Country: Australia

Physical characteristics
- Source
  - location: Arrino
  - elevation: 250 metres (820 ft)
- Mouth
  - location: Arrowsmith Lake
- Length: 85 km (53 mi)
- Basin size: 1,833 km^{2} (708 sq mi)
- Discharge
  - average: 5,212 ML/a (5.833 cu ft/s)

The Arrowsmith River lies within the Mid West region of Western Australia.

The explorer George Grey found the river on 11 April 1839, on his second expedition along the west coast. He named it after the distinguished English cartographer John Arrowsmith.

The river commences just south of Arrino and north-west of Three Springs near the Midlands Road and flows in a westerly direction for a length of 85 kilometres (53 mi) to the coast and terminates in Arrowsmith Lake, 9 kilometres (6 mi) inland from Cliff Head.

The river drops a total of 219 metres (719 ft) in elevation over the course of its length.

Flooding in surrounding areas occurred in 1932 following a torrential downpour that caused the river and surrounding creeks to rise and flood a few hours later.

The salinity levels in the river are often higher than 1000 mg/L due to brackish run-off water, but the potential bore yields of the catchment are quite high.
