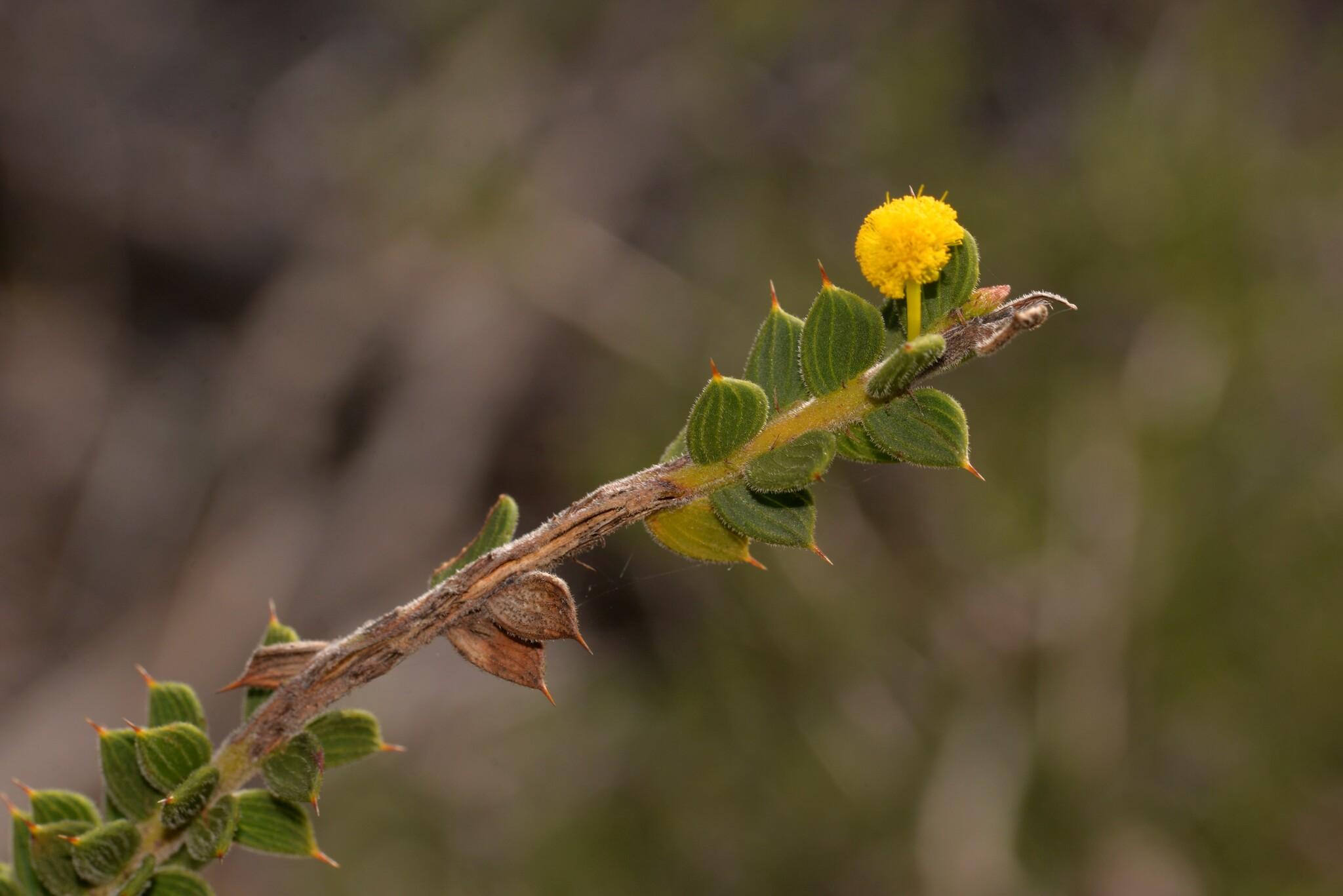

Scientific classification
- Kingdom: Plantae
- Clade: Tracheophytes
- Clade: Angiosperms
- Clade: Eudicots
- Clade: Rosids
- Order: Fabales
- Family: Fabaceae
- Subfamily: Caesalpinioideae
- Clade: Mimosoid clade
- Genus: Acacia
- Subgenus: Acacia subg. Plurinerves
- Species: A. comans

Binomial name
- Acacia comans W.Fitzg.
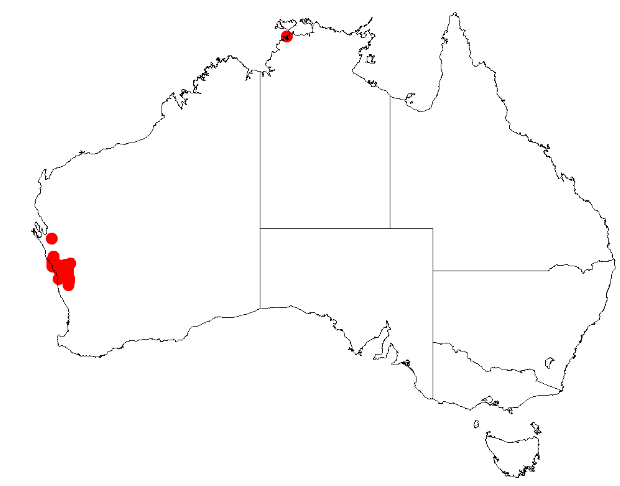
- Occurrence data from AVH

Synonyms
- Racosperma comans (W.Fitzg.) Pedley

= Acacia comans =

Species of legume

Acacia comans is a species of flowering plant in the family Fabaceae and is endemic to an area along the west coast Western Australia. It is a spreading shrub with hairy branchlets, sessile, widely elliptic to oblong phyllodes, usually spherical heads of yellow flowers, and linear leathery pods.

== Description ==
Acacia comans is a spreading shrub that typically grows to a height of 0.3–2 m (1 ft 0 in – 6 ft 7 in) and has terete, slightly ribbed branchlets that are densely covered with straight, spreading hairs. Its phyllodes are sessile, widely elliptic to oblong, 3.5–9 mm (0.14–0.35 in) long, 1.5–5 mm (0.059–0.197 in) wide and sharply pointed with three or four main veins and a gland 1.5–3.5 mm (0.059–0.138 in) above the base of the phyllodes. There are needle-shaped stipules 1.5–2.3 mm (0.059–0.091 in) at the base of the phyllodes. The flowers are borne in one or two spherical heads in axils on peduncles 5–15 mm (0.20–0.59 in) long, each head 4.0–4.5 mm (0.16–0.18 in) in diameter with 25 to 36 yellow flowers. Flowering occurs from June to September and the pods are linear, leathery, up to 45 mm (1.8 in) long and 4–5 mm (0.16–0.20 in) wide and raised over the seeds. The seeds are mottled brown, oval to more or less circular, about 3 mm (0.12 in) long with a helmet-shaped aril.

== Taxonomy ==
Acacia comans was first formally described in 1904 by William Vincent Fitzgerald in the Journal of the West Australian Natural History Society from specimens he collected near Arrino in 1903. The specific epithet (comans) means 'hairy'.

== Distribution ==
This species of wattle occurs from near Geraldton in the north to around Coorow in the south where it grows on sandplains in sandy soils in the Avon Wheatbelt, Geraldton Sandplains and Yalgoo bioregions in the west of Western Australia.

== Conservation status ==
"Acacia comans" is listed as "not threatened" by the Government of Western Australia Department of Biodiversity, Conservation and Attractions.

== See also ==
- List of Acacia species
