= Three Springs Mine =

Mine in Western Australia

- Location in Australia
- Location: Three Springs, Western Australia, Australia; 29°30′45″S 115°51′36″E
- Products: Talc
- Production: 240,000 tonnes
- Financial year: 2004
- Company: Imerys
- Acquired: 2011

Three Springs Mine is a talc open cut mine located outside of Three Springs, Western Australia. It is owned by Imerys.

== History ==
The deposit was discovered during a well sinking operation in the 1940s. it was initially worked initially as an underground mine until 1961 when Western Mining Corporation (WMC) acquired a 50% shareholding and an open cut mine was established. WMC took full ownership in 1987.

In August 2001, Rio Tinto acquired the mine. In 2011 Rio Tinto sold it to Imerys.

It is the oldest and most productive talc mine in the Southern Hemisphere, and the second-most productive talc mine in the world, with annual production in 2004 of 240,000 tonnes.
