= Arrino, Western Australia =

Arrino
- Town
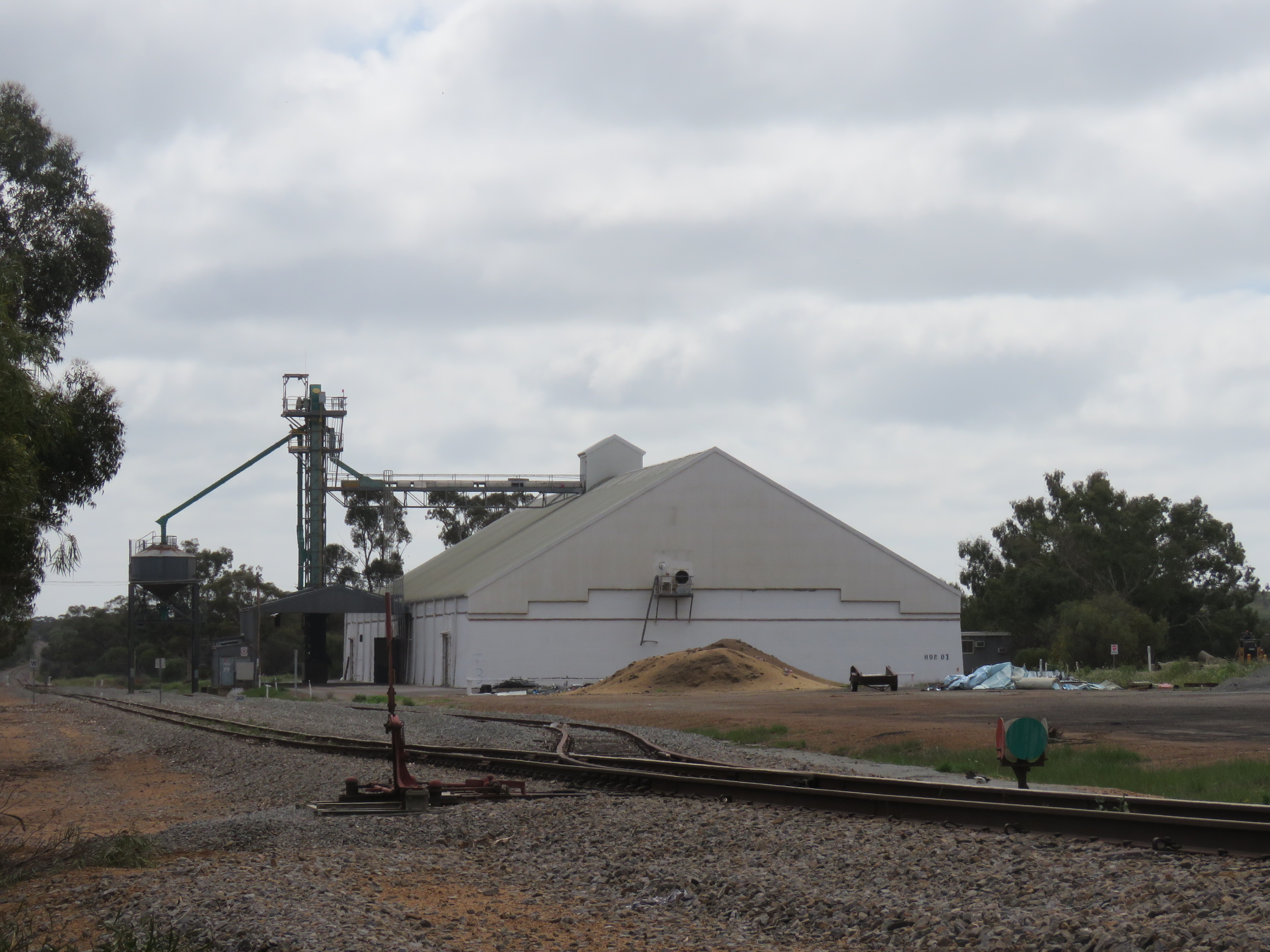
- The Arrino grain receival point in August 2022

- Interactive map of Arrino
- Coordinates: 29°26′20″S 115°37′41″E
- Country: Australia
- State: Western Australia
- LGA: Shire of Three Springs
- Location: 333 km (207 mi) N of Perth; 17 km (11 mi) NW of Three Springs; 45 km (28 mi) SW of Morawa
- Established: 1904

Government
  - State electorate: Moore
  - Federal division: Durack

Area
  - Total: 399.4 km^{2} (154.2 sq mi)
- Elevation: 263 m (863 ft)

Population
  - Total: 48 (SAL 2021)
- Postcode: 6519

Arrino is a small town in the Mid West region of Western Australia. The town is located between Mingenew and Three Springs on the Midlands Road.

The name of the town is Aboriginal in origin; it is the name of the local springs, thought to mean "place of many granite hills". The name first appeared in charts in 1859 and was also the name of a property established by an early settler, NW Cooke, in 1876. The townsite was gazetted in 1904.

Plans for a school and quarters to be built were drawn up in 1905 with an estimated cost of £325.

Flooding occurred at Arrino in 1932 following a torrential downpour that caused the Arrowsmith River and surrounding creeks to rise and flood a few hours later. A section of the railway between Arrino and Three Springs was washed away as a result, closing the line for several days. Later the same year massive bushfires swept across the surrounding areas destroying crops and bushland; about 10,000 acres (4,000 ha) of countryside were burnt out. More fires were started the following year (1933), resulting in another 2,000 acres (810 ha) of farmland being lost to the flames.

The main industry in town is wheat farming, with the town being a Cooperative Bulk Handling receival site.
