= Three Springs, Western Australia =

Three Springs
- Town
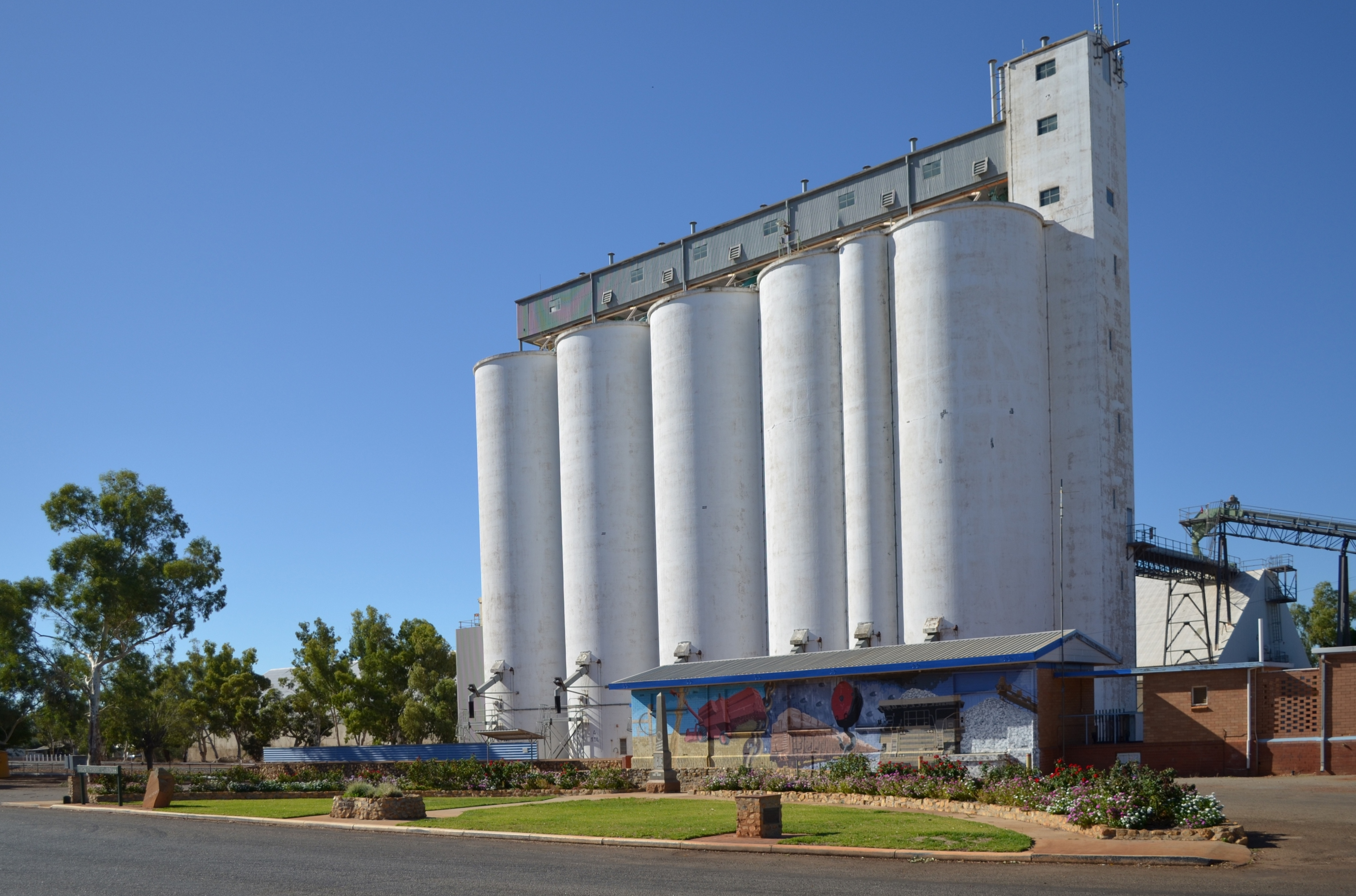
- Three Springs railway station and grain silo, 2013.

- Interactive map of Three Springs
- Coordinates: 29°32′00″S 115°45′42″E
- Country: Australia
- State: Western Australia
- LGA: Shire of Three Springs
- Location: 313 km (194 mi) N of Perth; 172 km (107 mi) SE of Geraldton; 20 km (12 mi) N of Carnamah
- Established: 1906

Government
  - State electorate: Moore
  - Federal division: Durack

Area
  - Total: 1.2 km^{2} (0.46 sq mi)
- Elevation: 257 m (843 ft)

Population
  - Total: 356 (SAL 2021)
- Postcode: 6519
- Mean max temp: 27 °C (81 °F)
- Mean min temp: 12.6 °C (54.7 °F)
- Annual rainfall: 376 mm (14.8 in)

Three Springs is a town located 313 kilometres (194 mi) north of Perth, Western Australia on the Midlands Road, which until the opening of the Brand Highway in 1975 was the main road route from Perth to the state's north. The town is the seat of the Shire of Three Springs. Its economy is based on agriculture (mainly broad acre grain cropping and sheep farming) and mining.

== History ==
The first Europeans to pass near the Three Springs area were government Assistant Surveyor Augustus Charles Gregory and Francis Thomas Gregory (both attached to the department of the Surveyor-General) and their brother Henry Churchman Gregory, on a public-private funded expedition to search for new agricultural land beyond the settled areas. On 14 September 1846, they camped at Eneabba Springs, 40 kilometres (25 mi) southwest of Three Springs, while returning to Perth from the Irwin River. In 1867, government Assistant Surveyor Charles Cooke Hunt, while undertaking a road survey recorded the words "Three Springs" at the site of the current town after some nearby springs. The name began to appear on official maps from then on and land in this region was soon taken up as pastoral leases.

In 1895, the Midland Railway was built under a land grant scheme from Midland Junction to Walkaway. Under the land grant scheme the railway consortium was able to select land within 40 miles (64 km) of the new railway. Three Springs was a siding on the line. In 1907 the government declared a townsite adjacent to the railway siding, gazetted as Kadathinni in 1908. It was also intended to change the name of the station when the townsite was named, but this was overlooked, and it remained Three Springs. The townsite was also locally known as Three Springs, and in 1946 the name was officially changed to Three Springs to conform with local usage.

In 1932, the Wheat Pool of Western Australia announced that the town would have two grain elevators, each fitted with an engine, installed at the railway siding.

== Flora ==
The shrub Banksia trifontinalis (Three Springs Dryandra) is named after the town, in the vicinity of which it was first collected.

== Economy ==
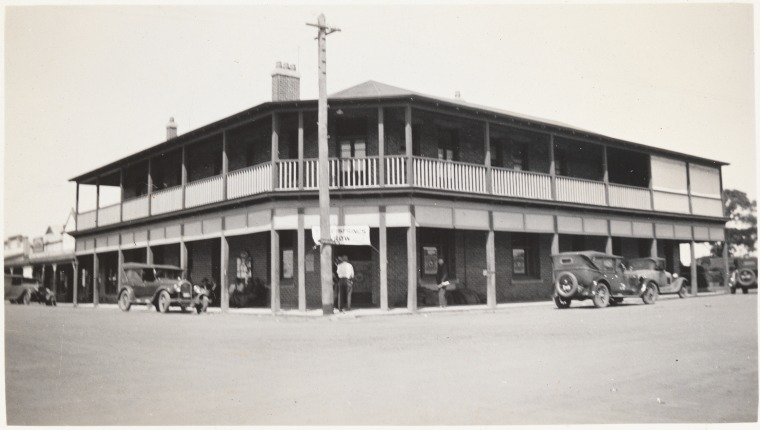
Commercial Hotel, ca.1925

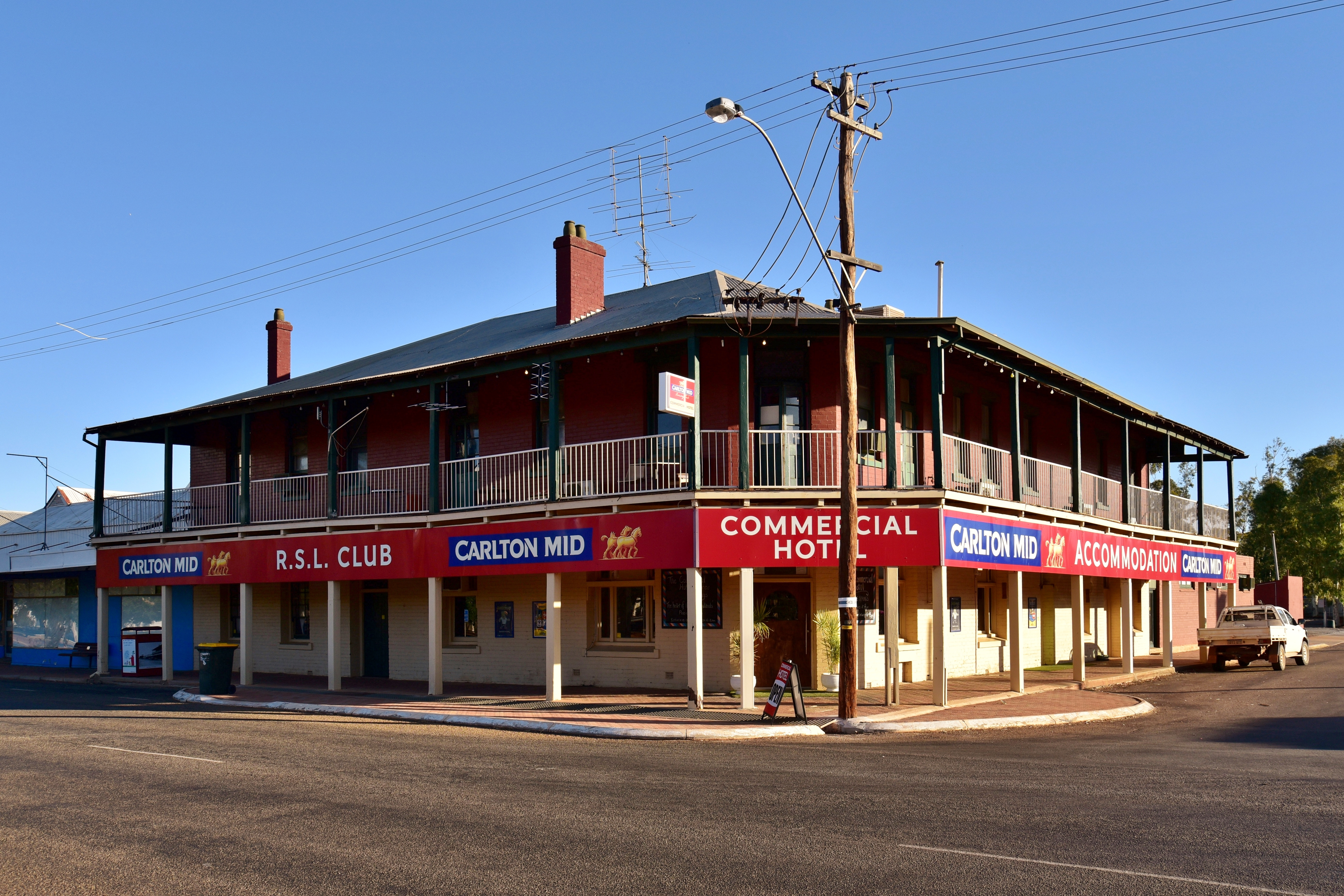
Commercial Hotel, 2018

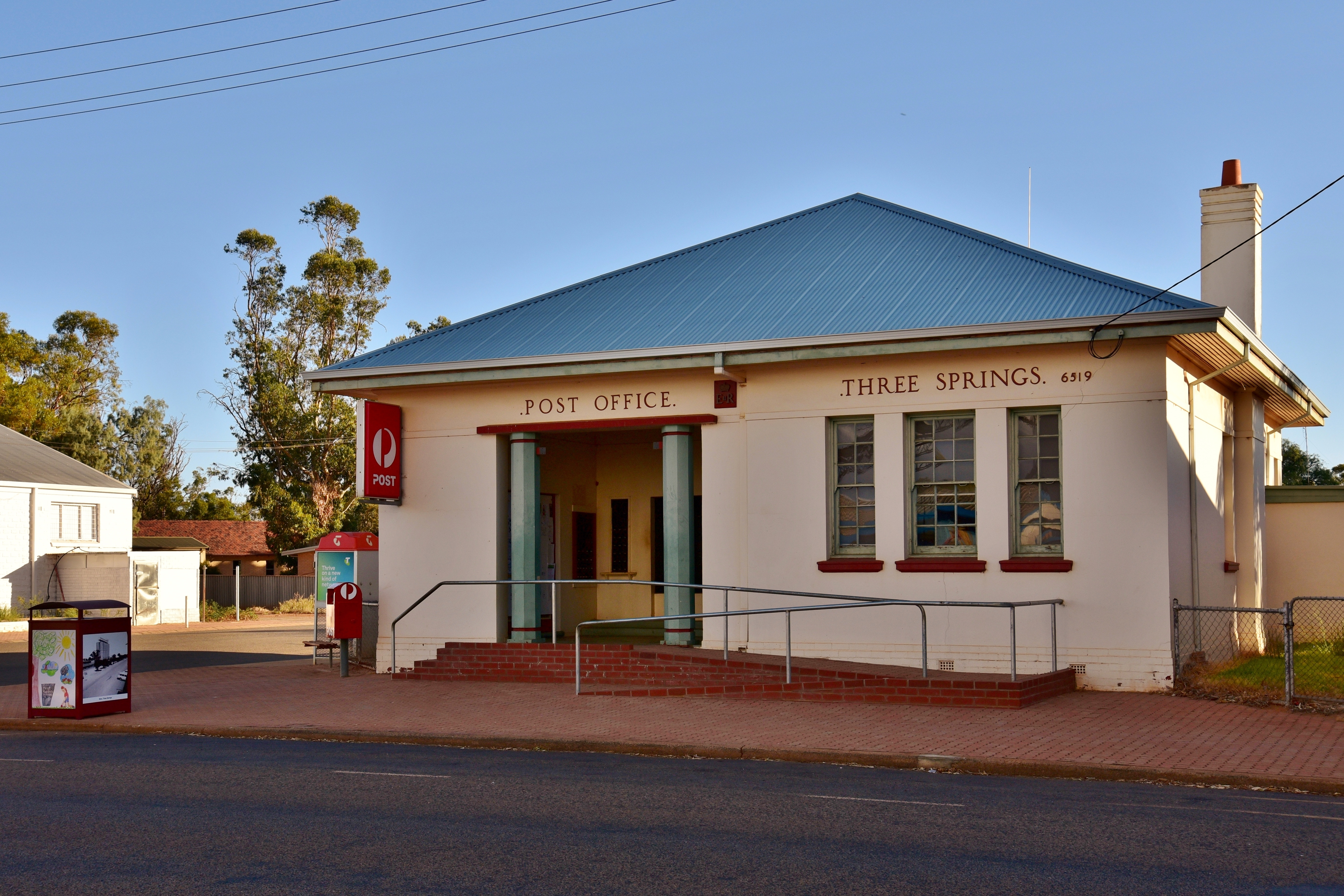
Post Office, 2018

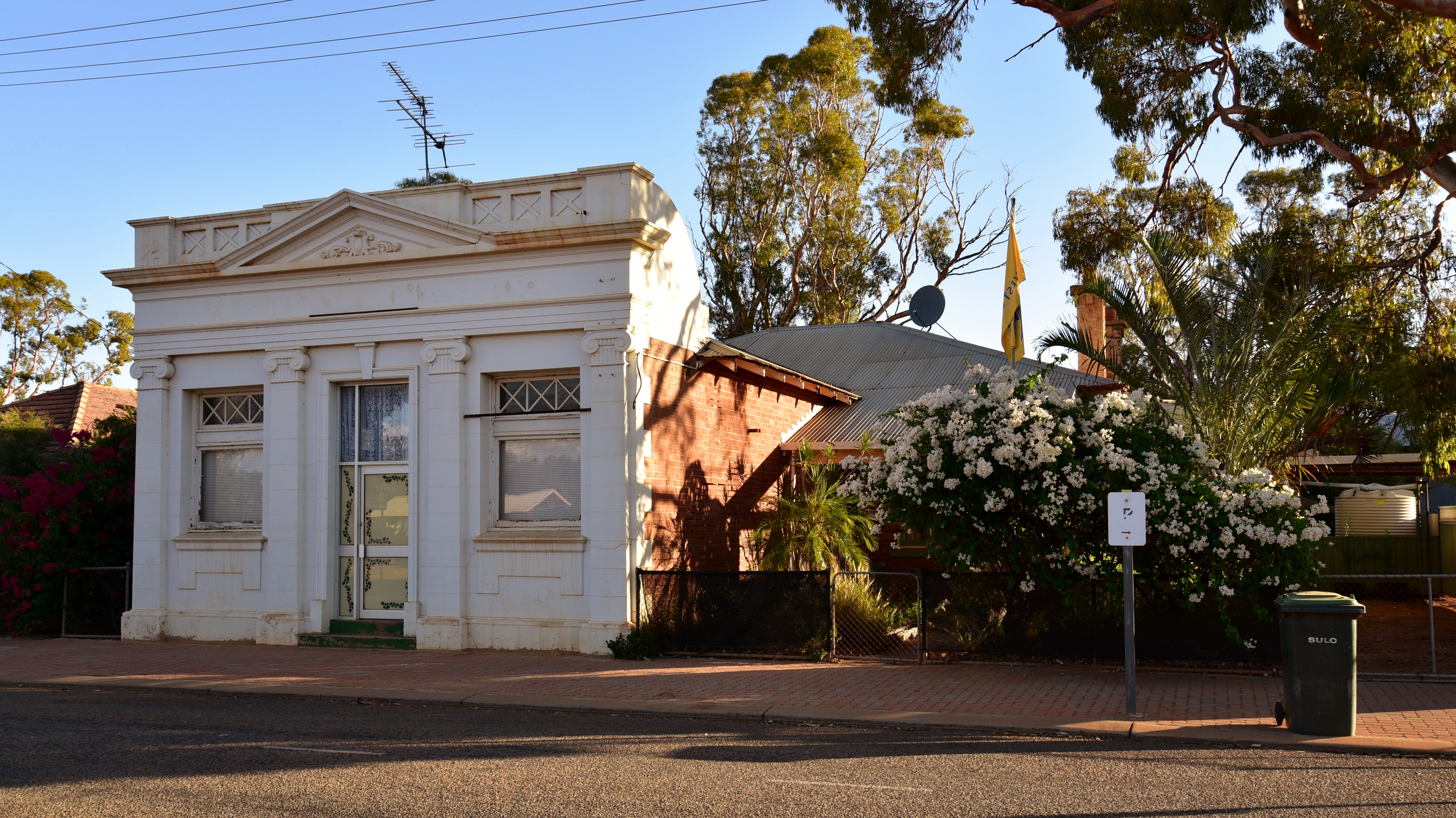
Former English, Scottish and Australian Bank, 2018

Three Springs' economy is built on mining and agriculture, including broad acre grain cropping and sheep farming, as well as cattle, pigs and wildflower intensive farming.

Imerys, a French industrial minerals company, operates the world's second largest talc mine just outside the Three Springs townsite. Up until 2004, the talc was railed to Geraldton for export. As a result of contamination from iron ore at the port rail unload facility, since 2004 it has been transported by road.

== Notable residents ==
- James Gardiner (1861–1928), politician
- Patrick Lynch (1867–1944), politician
