= Common hovea =

Common hovea is a common name for several plants native to Australia and may refer to:

- Hovea linearis
- Hovea trisperma, endemic to Western Australia
