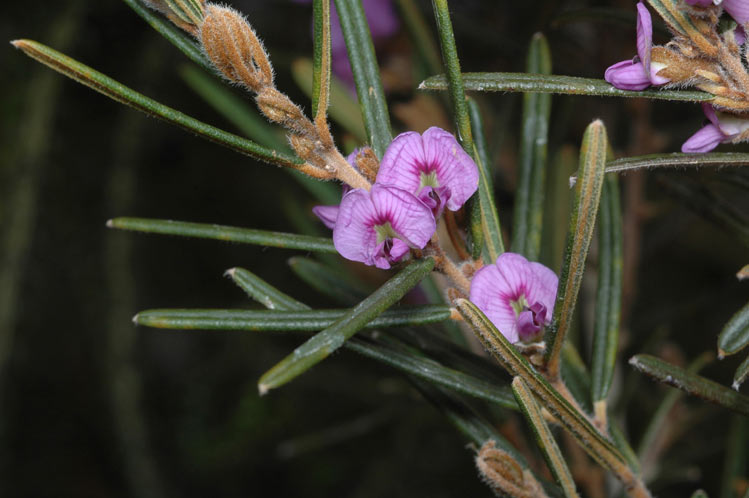
- Subspecies asperifolia in the ANBG

Scientific classification
- Kingdom: Plantae
- Clade: Embryophytes
- Clade: Tracheophytes
- Clade: Angiosperms
- Clade: Eudicots
- Clade: Rosids
- Order: Fabales
- Family: Fabaceae
- Subfamily: Faboideae
- Genus: Hovea
- Species: H. asperifolia

Binomial name
- Hovea asperifolia I.Thomps.

= Hovea asperifolia =

Species of legume

Hovea asperifolia is a species of flowering plant in the family Fabaceae, and is endemic to south-eastern continental Australia. It is a shrub with hairy branchlets, narrowly oblong to narrowly linear leaves with stipules at the base, and mauve, pea-like flowers.

== Description ==
Hovea asperifolia is a shrub that typically grows to a height of up to 3 m (9.8 ft), its branchlets densely covered with white to grey or black hairs. The leaves are narrowly oblong to narrowly linear, 10–100 mm (0.39–3.94 in) long, 2.5–9 mm (0.098–0.354 in) wide on a petiole 2–4 mm (0.079–0.157 in) long with densely hairy stipules 0.5–2 mm (0.020–0.079 in) long at the base. The leaves are usually more or less glabrous, flat to arched either side of the mid-vein, and rough on the upper surface. The flowers are usually arranged in pairs in leaf axils, each flower on a hairy pedicel 1–2 mm (0.039–0.079 in) long with hairy bracts and bracteoles 1.5–4 mm (0.059–0.157 in) long at the base. The sepals are 3–5.5 mm (0.12–0.22 in) long, the upper pair joined and 2–3 mm (0.079–0.118 in) wide, the three lower lobes 1.0–2.5 mm (0.039–0.098 in) long. The standard petal is pale to deep mauve, sometimes with a yellow centre, and 7–10 mm (0.28–0.39 in) long, 7–12 mm (0.28–0.47 in) wide. The wings are 6.5–9.5 mm (0.26–0.37 in) long and the keel 4.5–6.0 mm (0.18–0.24 in) long. Flowering occurs from August to November and the fruit is a pod 8–15 mm (0.31–0.59 in) long.

== Taxonomy and naming ==
Hovea asperifolia was first formally described in 2001 by Ian R. Thompson in Australian Systematic Botany from specimens collected near Powelltown in 1983. Hovea asperifolia was previously included in H. pannosa.

In the same journal article, Thompson described two subspecies and the names are accepted by the Australian Plant Census:

- Hovea asperifolia I.Thomps. subsp. asperifolia has leaves up to 9 mm (0.35 in) wide and the standard petal has a yellow base.
- Hovea asperifolia subsp. spinosissima I.Thomps. has leaves up to 4 mm (0.16 in) wide and the standard petal is entirely mauve.

== Distribution and habitat ==
This species of pea grows in forest in hilly to mountainous country in south-eastern New South Wales, the Australian Capital Territory and eastern Victoria. Subspecies spinosissima is restricted to the ranges near Daylesford and Euroa in central Victoria.
