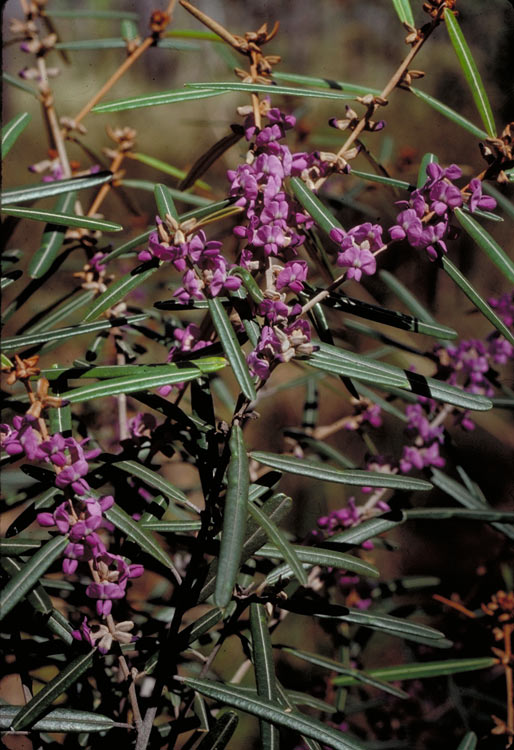

Scientific classification
- Kingdom: Plantae
- Clade: Tracheophytes
- Clade: Angiosperms
- Clade: Eudicots
- Clade: Rosids
- Order: Fabales
- Family: Fabaceae
- Subfamily: Faboideae
- Genus: Hovea
- Species: H. nitida

Binomial name
- Hovea nitida I.Thomps.

= Hovea nitida =

Species of legume

Hovea nitida, commonly known as purple bush pea or long-leaved hovea, is a species of flowering plant in the family Fabaceae and is endemic to Queensland, Australia. It is a shrub covered with brown, coiled hairs, very narrowly elliptic to strap-shaped leaves, mauve flowers and a sessile pod.

== Description ==
Hovea nitida is a shrub that typically grows to a height of up to 3 m (9.8 ft) and is covered with brown to grey-brown, coiled hairs. The leaves are very narrowly elliptic or strap-shaped, 50–70 mm (2.0–2.8 in) long and 6–8 mm (0.24–0.31 in) wide on a petiole 3–4 mm (0.12–0.16 in) long. There are stipules 0.7–1.2 mm (0.028–0.047 in) long at the base of the petioles. The flowers are usually sessile and arranged in pairs, each flower on a pedicel 2–4 mm (0.079–0.157 in) long, with a bracts and bracteoles 1.2–1.8 mm (0.047–0.071 in) long at the base. The sepals are 3.5–4.8 mm (0.14–0.19 in) long and joined at the base, forming a tube 2.0–2.5 mm (0.079–0.098 in) long, the upper lip about 4.0 mm (0.16 in) wide. The petals are mauve, the standard petal 7–8 mm (0.28–0.31 in) long with a central greenish yellow "flare", the wings 2.5–3.0 mm (0.098–0.118 in) wide. Flowering occurs in August and September and the pods are sessile and sparsely hairy, the seed with an aril 5.0–5.5 mm (0.20–0.22 in) long.

== Taxonomy ==
Hovea nitida was first formally described in 2001 by Ian R. Thompson in Australian Systematic Botany from specimens collected in the Chilverton area, between Atherton and Ravenshoe by Donald Bruce Foreman in 1987. The specific epithet (nitida) means 'shining' or 'bright'.

== Distribution and habitat ==
This species of pea grows in rocky sites, often near streams near rainforest or in forest.

== Conservation status ==
Hovea nitida is listed as of "least concern" under the Queensland Government Nature Conservation Act 1992.
