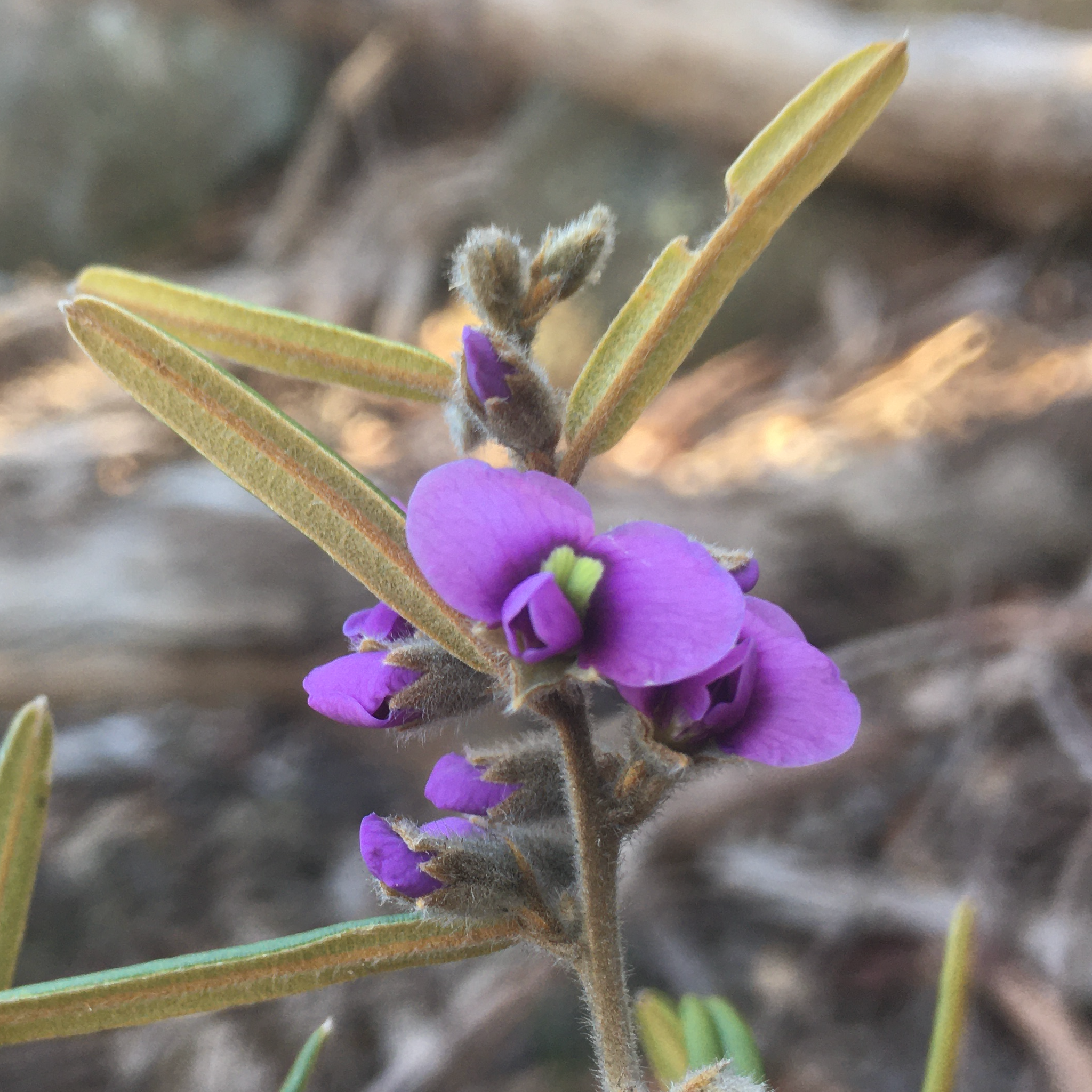
- Near Stanthorpe

Scientific classification
- Kingdom: Plantae
- Clade: Tracheophytes
- Clade: Angiosperms
- Clade: Eudicots
- Clade: Rosids
- Order: Fabales
- Family: Fabaceae
- Subfamily: Faboideae
- Genus: Hovea
- Species: H. graniticola

Binomial name
- Hovea graniticola I.Thomps.

= Hovea graniticola =

Species of legume

Hovea graniticola is a species of flowering plant in the family Fabaceae and is endemic to eastern Australia. It is a shrub with its branchlets covered with curly brownish to grey hairs, narrowly oblong to almost linear leaves with stipules at the base, and mauve, pea-like flowers.

== Description ==
Hovea graniticola is a shrub that typically grows to a height of up to 2.5 m (8 ft 2 in), its branchlets covered with brownish to grey, curly and straight hairs up to 1 mm (0.039 in) long. The leaves are very narrowly oblong to linear, mostly 25–50 mm (0.98–1.97 in) long, 2.5–6 mm (0.098–0.236 in) wide on a petiole 2.0–3.5 mm (0.079–0.138 in) long with stipules 2–5 mm (0.079–0.197 in) long at the base. The edges of the leaves are turned down or rolled under and arched on both sides of the midvein. The upper surface of the leaves is glabrous and the lower surface is densely covered with curly orangish hairs and longer spreading hairs. The flowers are usually arranged in leaf axils in pairs, each flower on a pedicel 2–3 mm (0.079–0.118 in) long, the sepals 4.5–6 mm (0.18–0.24 in) long. Flowering occurs from August to September and the fruit is a pod about 10 mm (0.39 in) long and wide.

== Taxonomy and naming ==
Hovea graniticola was first formally described in 2001 by Ian R. Thompson in Australian Systematic Botany from specimens collected by James Henderson Ross near Jollys Falls, west of The Summit in 1986. The specific epithet (graniticola) means "granite-dwelling".

== Distribution and habitat ==
This species of pea grows in forest on soil derived from granite, from south-east Queensland to near Tamworth in New South Wales.
