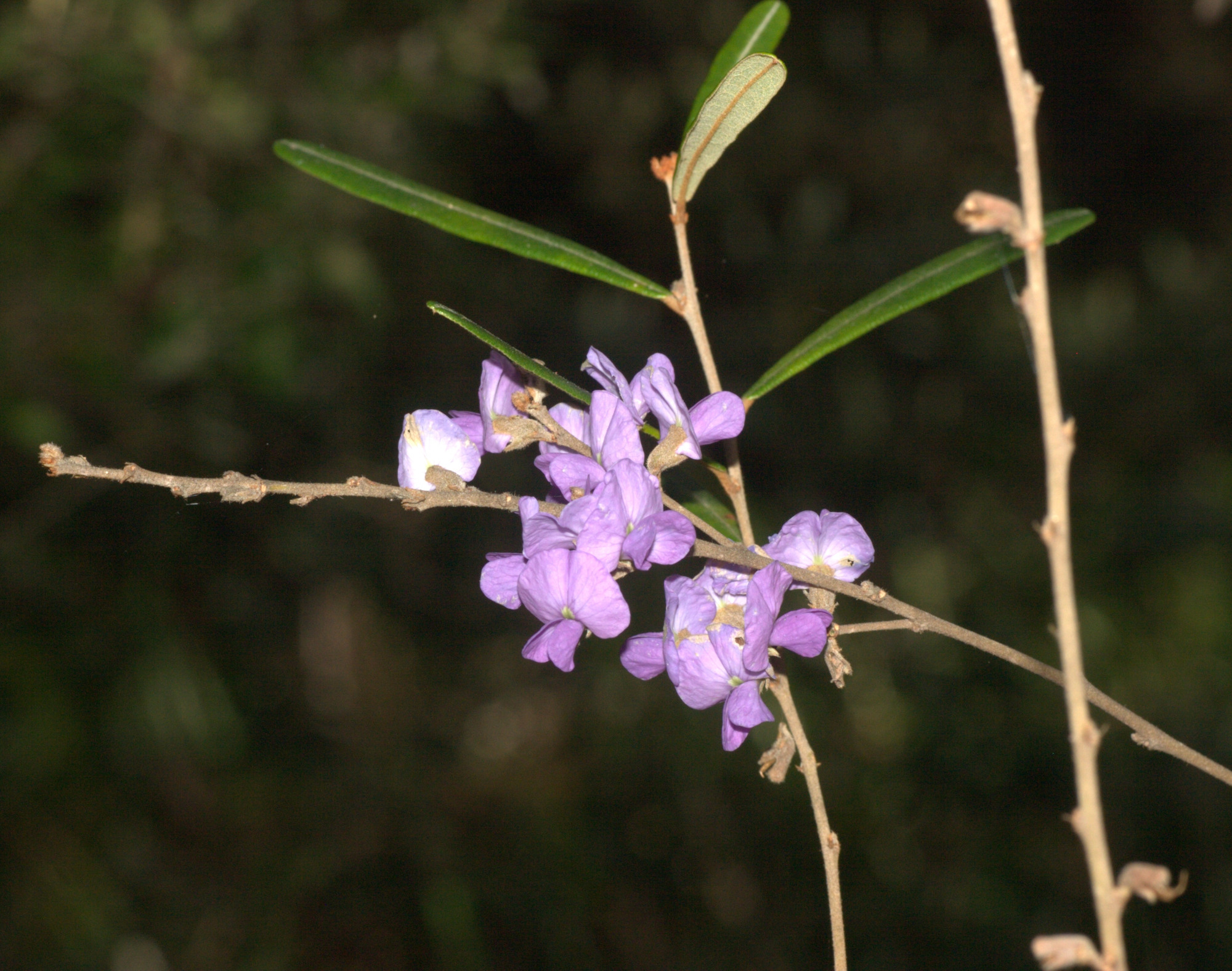

Scientific classification
- Kingdom: Plantae
- Clade: Tracheophytes
- Clade: Angiosperms
- Clade: Eudicots
- Clade: Rosids
- Order: Fabales
- Family: Fabaceae
- Subfamily: Faboideae
- Genus: Hovea
- Species: H. clavata

Binomial name
- Hovea clavata I.Thomps.

= Hovea clavata =

Species of legume

Hovea clavata, is a species of flowering plant in the family Fabaceae and is endemic to Queensland, Australia. It is a shrub with very narrowly elliptic, lance-shaped or strap-like leaves, groups of usually two violet-purple flowers and hairy, sessile pods.

== Description ==
Hovea clavata is a shrub that typically grows to a height of up to 2 m (6 ft 7 in), and is covered with coiled, crumpled or straight grey to tan-grey hairs. The leaves are very narrowly elliptic, lance-shaped with the narrower end towards the base, or strap-like 2.5–8 mm (0.098–0.315 in) long and 4–8 mm (0.16–0.31 in) wide, the edges turned under, the upper surface with slightly raised veins and hairs along the midrib. There are stipules 1–2 mm (0.039–0.079 in) long at the base of the leaves. Usually two flowers are borne in sessile pairs, each flower on a pedicel 1.5–2.5 mm (0.059–0.098 in) long with a bract and egg-shaped to narrowly egg-shaped bracteoles 1.5–2.0 mm (0.059–0.079 in) long at the base. The sepals are 4.5–5.5 mm (0.18–0.22 in) long, forming a tube 2.5–2.8 mm (0.098–0.110 in) long, the upper lip 3–4 mm (0.12–0.16 in) wide. The standard petal is 9.5–10.5 mm (0.37–0.41 in) long, violet-purple with a central greenish "flare" in the centre, and the wing 3.4–4.5 mm (0.13–0.18 in) wide. Flowering occurs form May to July and the fruit is a hairy, sessile pod.

== Taxonomy and naming ==
Hovea clavata was first formally described in 2001 by Ian R. Thompson and the description was published in Australian Systematic Botany from specimens collected by Lawrie Johnson 5 km (3.1 mi) along Five Rocks Road, east of the Byfield-Yeppoon road in 1981. The specific epithet (clavata) means 'club-shaped'.

== Distribution and habitat ==
This species grows in sandy in heathland in south-eastern Queensland between Shoalwater Bay and Maryborough.

== Conservation status ==
Hovea clavata is listed as of "least concern" under the Queensland Government Nature Conservation Act 1992.
