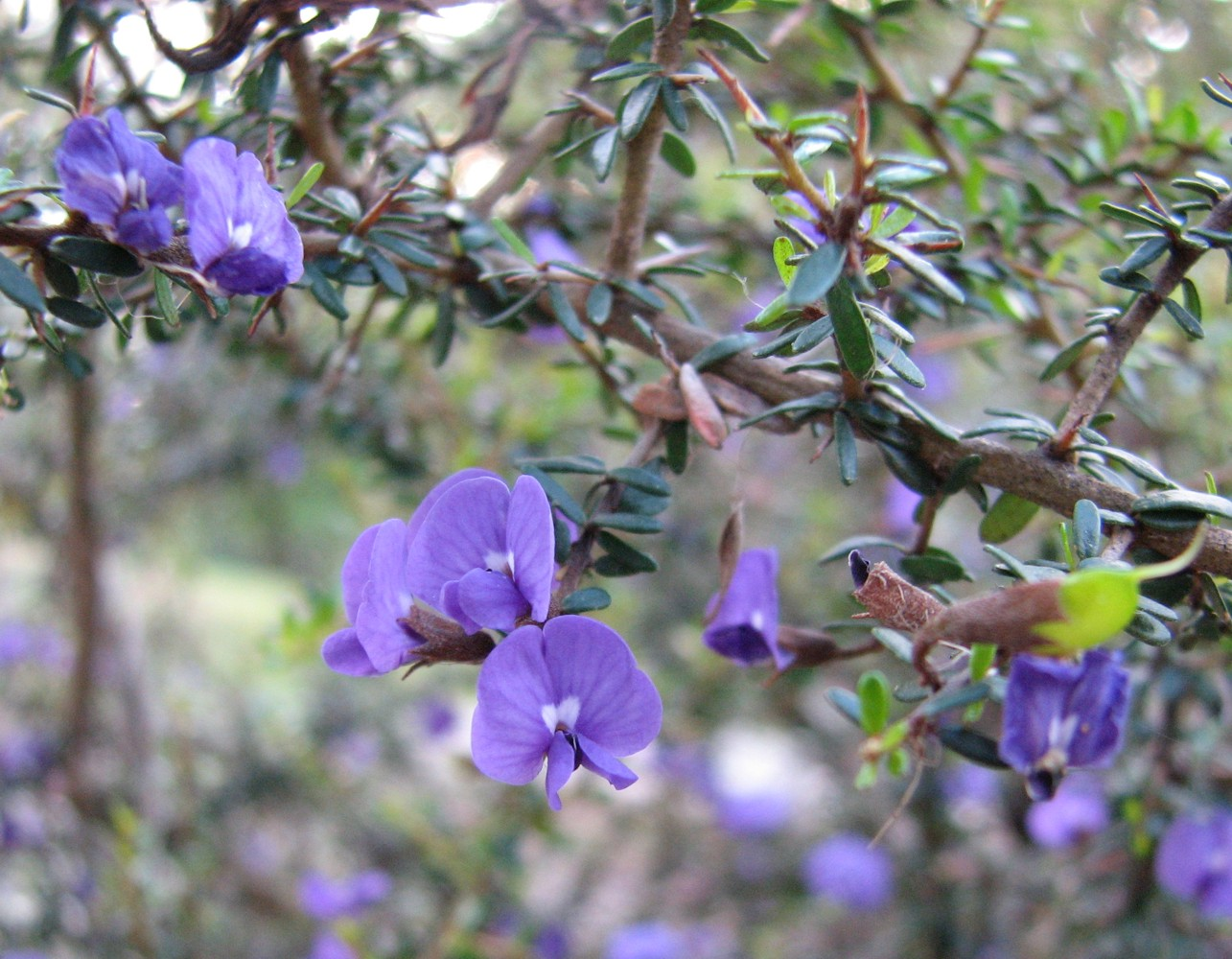
- Hovea acanthoclada

Scientific classification
- Kingdom: Plantae
- Clade: Tracheophytes
- Clade: Angiosperms
- Clade: Eudicots
- Clade: Rosids
- Order: Fabales
- Family: Fabaceae
- Subfamily: Faboideae
- Tribe: Brongniartieae
- Genus: Hovea; R.Br.

Species
- See text.
- Range of Hovea

Synonyms
- Phusicarpos Poir.; Plagiolobium Sweet; Platychilum Laun.; Poiretia Sm. nom. illeg., nom. rej.

= Hovea =

Genus of legumes

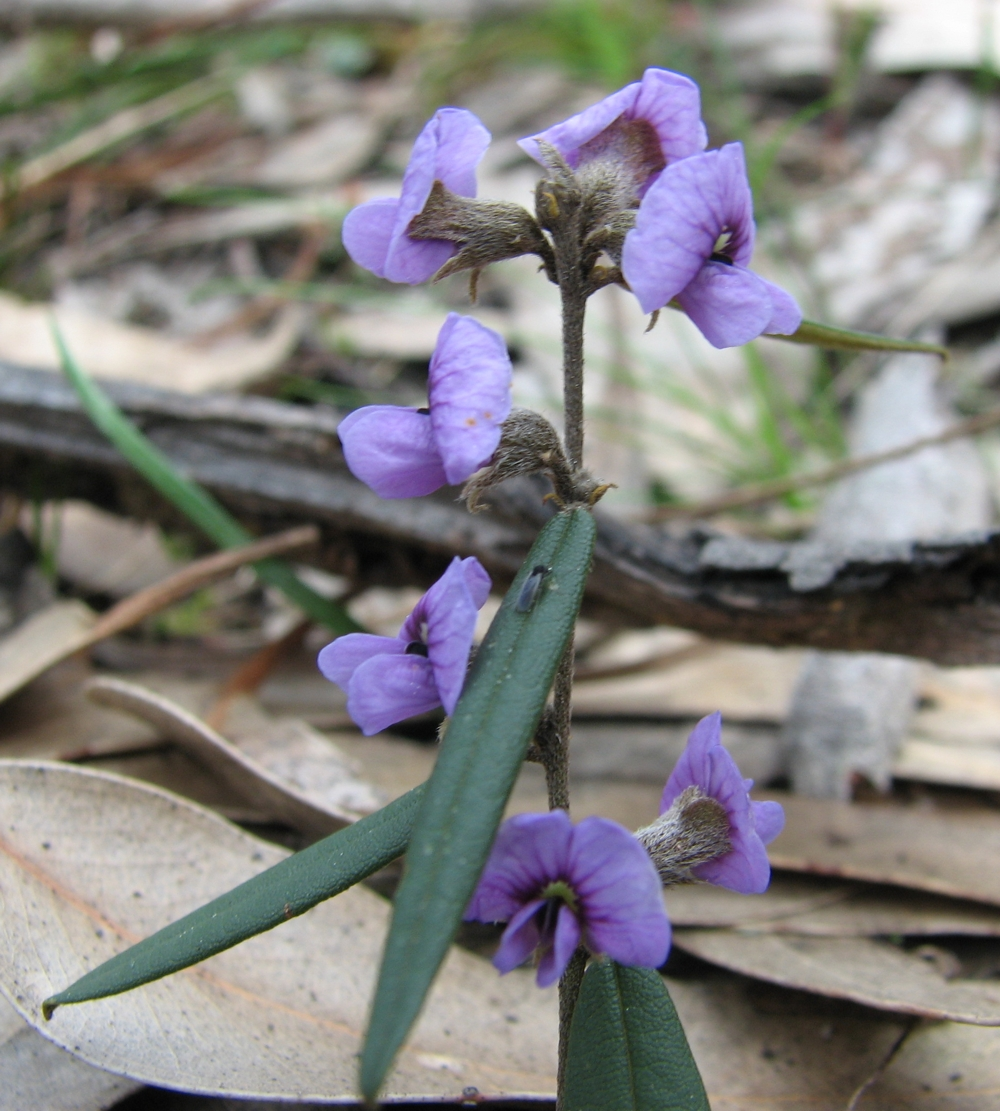
Hovea linearis

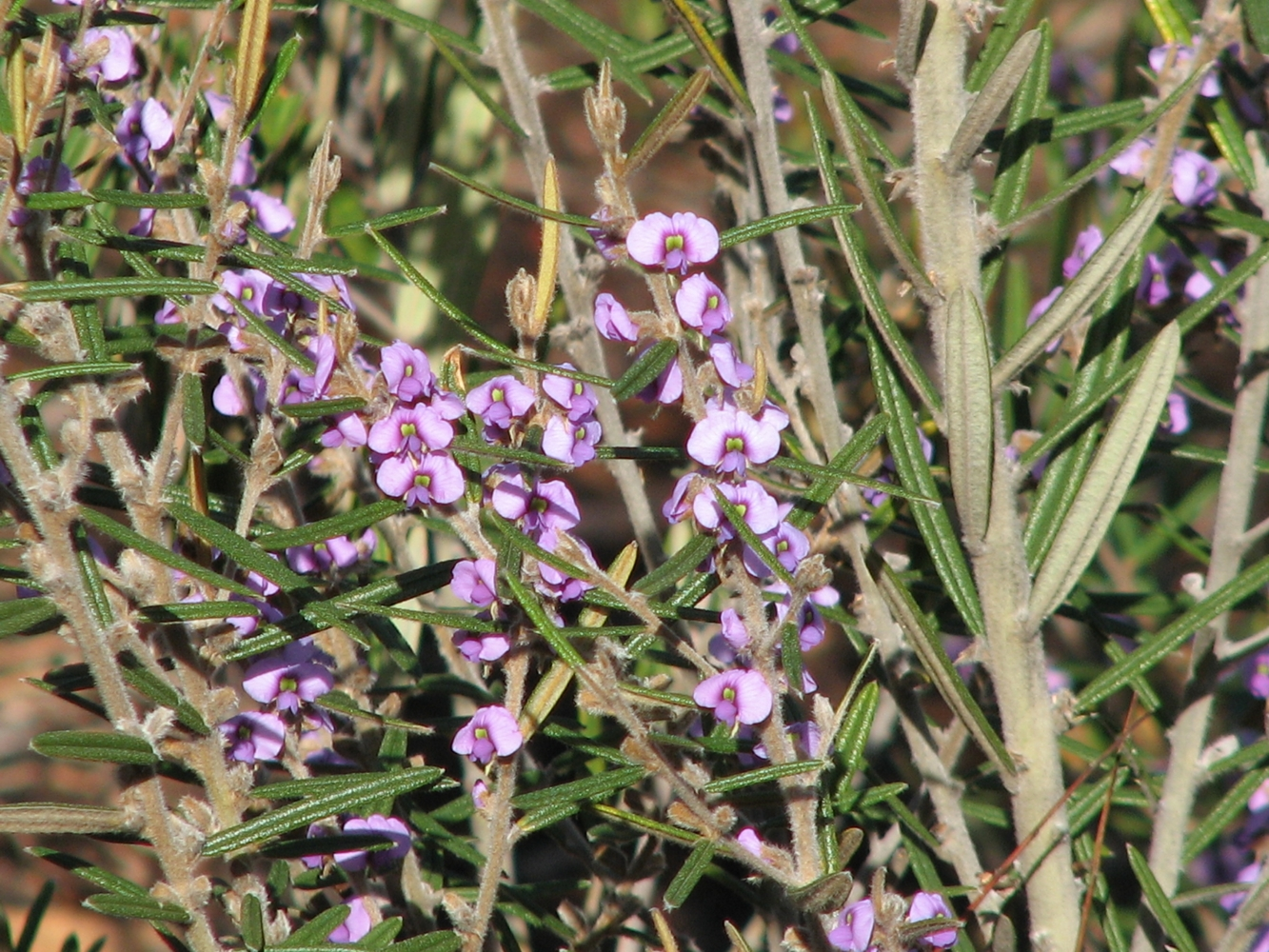
Hovea pannosa

Hovea is a genus of about forty species of flowering plants in the family Fabaceae, and is endemic to Australia. Plants in this genus are sub-shrubs, shrubs or small trees with simple leaves and purple, blue or mauve flowers with a white centre. The fruit is a pod containing brown to blackish seeds. Species of Hovea occur in all Australian states, the Australian Capital Territory and the Northern Territory.

== Description ==
Plants in the genus Hovea are sub-shrubs, shrubs or sometimes small trees. The leaves are arranged alternately and are simple, usually with stipules at the base and sometimes with prickly edges. The flowers are arranged in leaf axils with bracts, and two bracteoles at the base of the sepals. The upper two sepal lobes are usually joined to form a broad "lip". The petals are purple, blue or mauve, rarely white, and the standard petal is circular to oblate, longer than the wings and keel. The ten stamens are joined into a sheath open on the upper side, and differ in length. There are usually only two ovules in the ovary and the fruit is a spherical to oval pod. The seeds are usually 4–6 mm (0.16–0.24 in) long and brown to black with an aril.

== Taxonomy ==
The genus Hovea was first formally described in 1812 by Robert Brown in Aiton's Hortus Kewensis, and the first species he described were H. linearis and H. longifolia. The genus name honours the Polish botanist and plant collector, Anton Pantaleon Hove.

== Distribution ==
Species of Hovea occur in all states and mainland territories of Australia.

== Species list ==
The following is a list of species of Hovea accepted by the Australian Plant Census as at June 2021:

- Hovea acanthoclada (Turcz.) F. Muell. – thorny hovea (W.A.)
- Hovea acutifolia A.Cunn. ex G.Don – northern hovea (Qld., N.S.W.)
- Hovea angustissima I.Thomps. (Qld.)
- Hovea apiculata A.Cunn. ex G.Don (Qld., N.S.W.)
- Hovea arnhemica J.H.Ross (N.T.)
- Hovea asperifolia I.Thomps. (N.S.W., A.C.T., Vic.)
- Hovea chorizemifolia DC. – holly-leaved hovea (W.A.)
- Hovea clavata I.Thomps. (Qld.)
- Hovea corrickiae J.H.Ross (Vic., Tas.)
- Hovea cymbiformis I.Thomps. (N.S.W.)
- Hovea densivellosa I.Thomps. (Qld.)
- Hovea elliptica (Sm.) DC. – tree hovea, karri blue bush (W.A.)
- Hovea graniticola I.Thomps. (N.S.W., Qld.)
- Hovea heterophylla A.Cunn. ex Hook. f. (Qld., N.S.W., A.C.T., Vic., Tas.)
- Hovea impressinerva I.Thomps. (Qld., N.S.W.)
- Hovea lanceolata Sims (Qld., N.S.W.)
- Hovea linearis (Sm.) R.Br. (S.A., Qld., N.S.W.)
- Hovea longifolia R.Br. – rusty pods (N.S.W.)
- Hovea longipes Benth. (Qld., N.S.W.)
- Hovea lorata I.Thomps. (Qld., N.S.W.)
- Hovea magnibractea I.Thomps. (Vic., Tas.)
- Hovea montana (Hook.f.) J.H.Ross – alpine hovea, mountain hovea, alpine rusty-pods (N.S.W., A.C.T., Vic., Tas.)
- Hovea nana I.Thomps. & J.H.Ross (Qld.)
- Hovea nitida I.Thomps. (Qld.)
- Hovea pannosa A.Cunn. ex Hook.f. (N.S.W., Vic.)
- Hovea parvicalyx I.Thomps. (Qld.)
- Hovea pedunculata I.Thomps. & J.H.Ross (Qld., N.S.W.)
- Hovea planifolia (Domin) J.H.Ross (Qld.)
- Hovea pungens Benth. – devil's pins (W.A.)
- Hovea purpurea Sweet (S.A., N.S.W., Vic.)
- Hovea ramulosa A.Cunn. ex Lindl. (Qld., N.S.W.)
- Hovea rosmarinifolia A.Cunn. – mountain beauty (N.S.W., Vic.)
- Hovea similis I.Thomps. (Qld., N.S.W.)
- Hovea speciosa I.Thomps. (N.S.W.)
- Hovea stricta Meissner (W.A.)
- Hovea tasmanica I.Thomps. & J.H.Ross (Tas.)
- Hovea tholiformis I.Thomps. (Qld.)
- Hovea trisperma Benth. – common hovea (W.A.)
