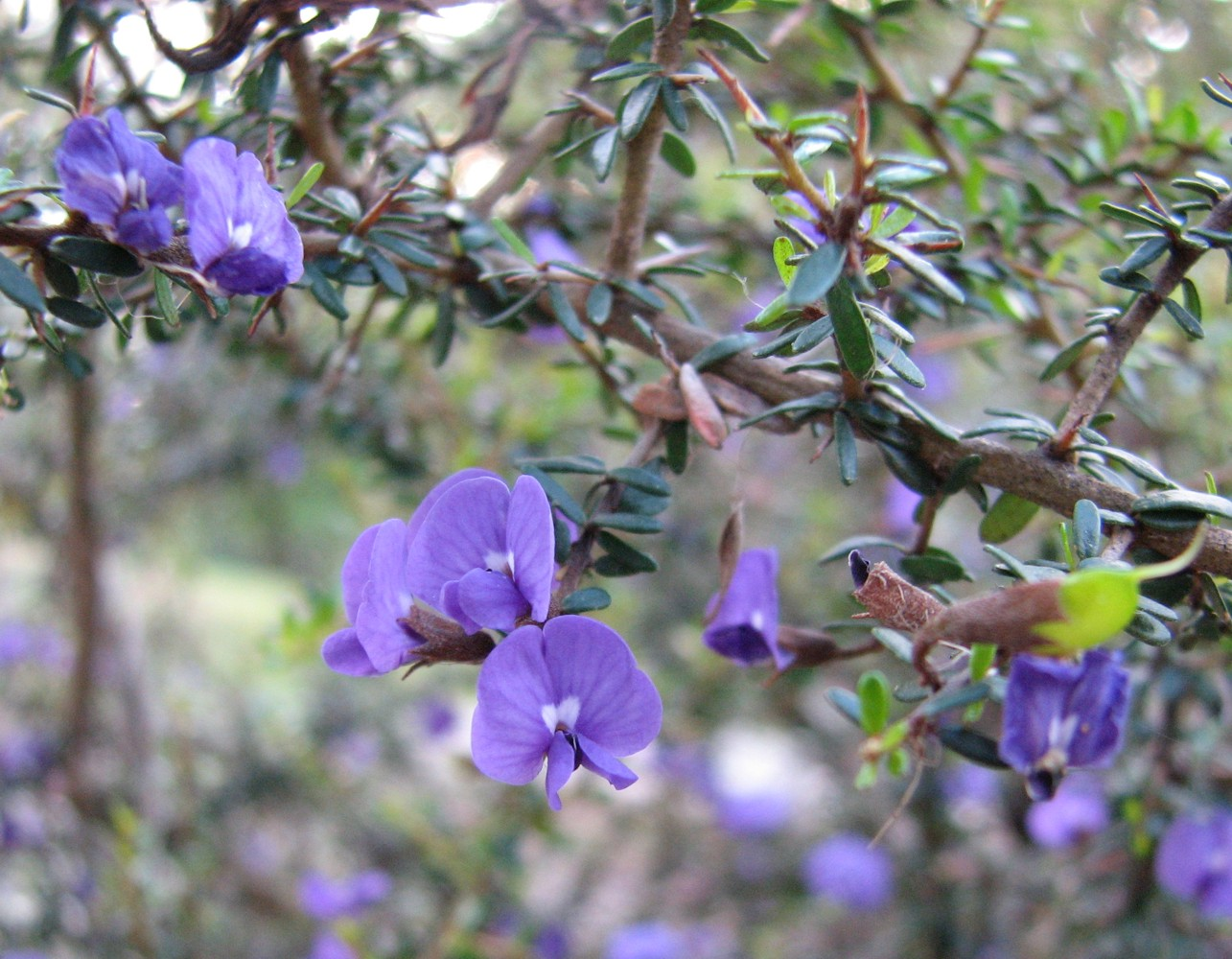

Scientific classification
- Kingdom: Plantae
- Clade: Embryophytes
- Clade: Tracheophytes
- Clade: Angiosperms
- Clade: Eudicots
- Clade: Rosids
- Order: Fabales
- Family: Fabaceae
- Subfamily: Faboideae
- Genus: Hovea
- Species: H. acanthoclada

Binomial name
- Hovea acanthoclada (Turcz.) F.Muell.

Synonyms
- Daviesia acanthoclada Turcz.

= Hovea acanthoclada =

Species of legume

Hovea acanthoclada, commonly known as thorny hovea, is a flowering plant in the family Fabaceae. It is an upright, prickly shrub with small dark green leaves and purple-blue pea flowers in winter and spring. It is endemic to the south-west of Western Australia.

== Description ==
Hovea acanthoclada is an upright or prostrate scrambling, stiff shrub to 1.5 m (4 ft 11 in) high, with needle-shaped, hairy stems. The leaves are oblong, whorled, flat, hairy, 2–5.5 mm (0.079–0.217 in) long and 2–2.6 mm (0.079–0.102 in) wide, margins toothed or lobed, pedicel 2–2.6 mm (0.079–0.102 in) long and hairy. The bracteoles 0.7–1.2 mm (0.028–0.047 in) long and hairy, calyx 4–5.6 mm (0.16–0.22 in) long with simple hairs. The corolla colours vary, mostly blue or violet with occasional markings, standard petal 8–9.5 mm (0.31–0.37 in) long and smooth, wings 7.5–8 mm (0.30–0.31 in) long, keel 5.5–7 mm (0.22–0.28 in) long. Flowering occurs from July to October and the fruit is a dry, smooth pod, 6–7 mm (0.24–0.28 in) long and 9–10 mm (0.35–0.39 in) wide.

== Taxonomy and naming ==
This species was first formally described in 1853 by Nikolai Turczaninow who gave it the name Daviesia acanthoclada in the Bulletin de la Société Impériale des Naturalistes de Moscou from specimens collected by James Drummond. In 1853, Ferdinand von Mueller transferred the species to Hovea as H. acanthoclada in his Fragmenta Phytographiae Australiae. The specific epithet (acanthoclada) means 'spiny-branched'.

== Distribution and habitat ==
Thorny hovea grows in lateritic soils in the south-west near Ravensthorpe and gravelly locations near Kalgoorlie.
