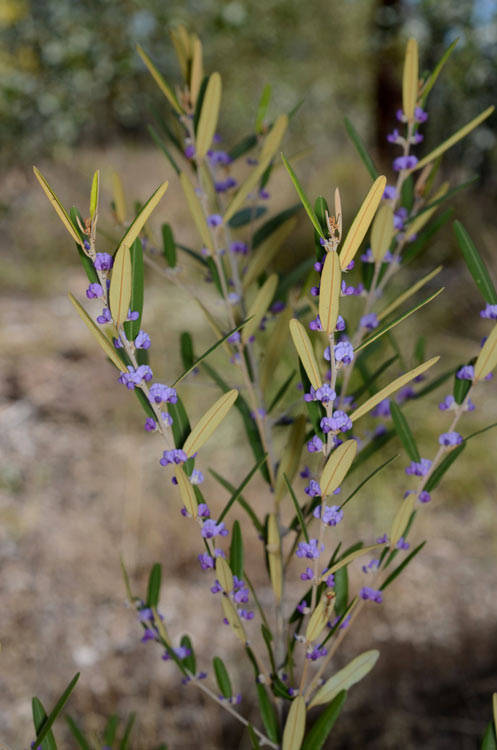
- In Carnarvon National Park

Scientific classification
- Kingdom: Plantae
- Clade: Tracheophytes
- Clade: Angiosperms
- Clade: Eudicots
- Clade: Rosids
- Order: Fabales
- Family: Fabaceae
- Subfamily: Faboideae
- Genus: Hovea
- Species: H. parvicalyx

Binomial name
- Hovea parvicalyx I.Thomps.

Synonyms
- Hovea longifolia subvar. apiculata (G.Don) Domin

= Hovea parvicalyx =

Species of legume

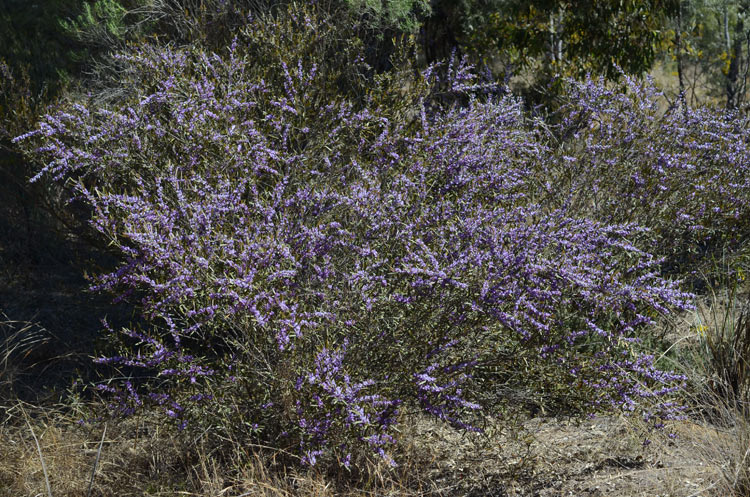
Habit

Hovea parvicalyx is a species of flowering plant in the family Fabaceae and is endemic to Queensland, Australia. It is a shrub covered with white to grey, coiled hairs, very narrowly elliptic to narrowly elliptic or strap-shaped leaves, mauve flowers and a sessile, densely hairy pod.

== Description ==
Hovea parvicalyx is a shrub that typically grows to a height of up to 2.5 m (8 ft 2 in) and is covered with white to grey, coiled hairs. The leaves are very narrowly elliptic to narrowly elliptic, lance-shaped with the narrower end towards the base or strap-shaped, 35–75 mm (1.4–3.0 in) long and 6–14 mm (0.24–0.55 in) wide on a petiole 4–9 mm (0.16–0.35 in) long. There are stipules 0.5–1.0 mm (0.020–0.039 in) long at the base of the petioles. The flowers are mostly borne in groups of two or three on a peduncle 1–2.5 mm (0.039–0.098 in) long, each flower on a pedicel 1–2.5 mm (0.039–0.098 in) long, with egg-shaped bracts and bracteoles 1.0–1.5 mm (0.039–0.059 in) long at the base. The sepals are 2.5–4 mm (0.098–0.157 in) long and joined at the base, forming a tube 1.5–2.5 mm (0.059–0.098 in) long, the upper lip about 3 mm (0.12 in) wide. The petals are mauve, the standard petal 5–7.5 mm (0.20–0.30 in) long with a central white "flare", the wings 2.9–3.5 mm (0.11–0.14 in) wide. Flowering occurs from June to August and the pods are sessile and densely hairy, the seed with an aril 3.6 mm (0.14 in) long.

== Taxonomy ==
Hovea parvicalyx was first formally described in 2001 by Ian R. Thompson in Australian Systematic Botany from specimens collected 8.7 km (5.4 mi) north-west of the Jeannie River in 1984.

== Distribution and habitat ==
This species of pea grows in sand, on sandstone outcrops or in gravelly soils, in forest and woodland in far northern and eastern Queensland from near the Starcke National Park to the Roma district.

== Conservation status ==
Hovea parvicalyx is listed as of "least concern" under the Queensland Government Nature Conservation Act 1992.
