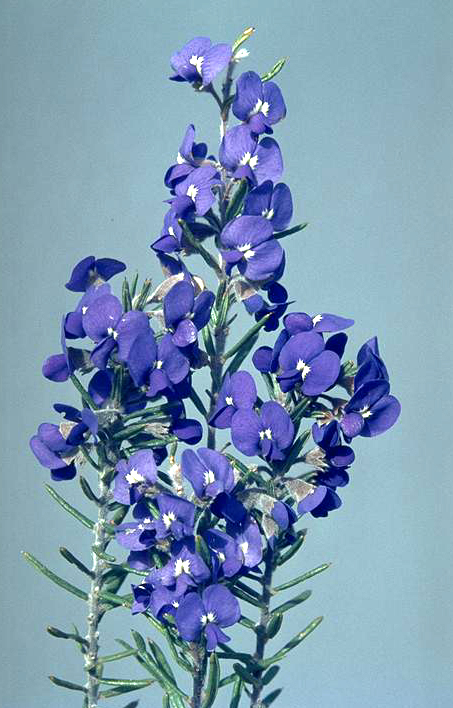

Scientific classification
- Kingdom: Plantae
- Clade: Tracheophytes
- Clade: Angiosperms
- Clade: Eudicots
- Clade: Rosids
- Order: Fabales
- Family: Fabaceae
- Subfamily: Faboideae
- Genus: Hovea
- Species: H. stricta

Binomial name
- Hovea stricta Meisn.

= Hovea stricta =

Species of legume

Hovea stricta is a flowering plant in the family Fabaceae and is endemic to the south-west of Western Australia. It is a small, upright shrub with mostly purple flowers, green needle-shaped leaves and flowering occurs in winter and spring.

== Description ==
Hovea stricta is an erect, spindly shrub typically growing to a height of 0.2 to 1 metre (1 to 3 ft) and branched singly or with numerous stems. The stems are needle-shaped, partly spikey and hairy, branchlets thickly covered with hairs. The leaves are simple, flat, arranged alternately, 15–42 mm (0.59–1.65 in) long and 2–7 mm (0.079–0.276 in) wide, hairy, with curved margins on a hairy pedicel 3 mm (0.12 in) long. The purple-blue flowers are borne in leaf axils, either singly or in small clusters on hairy pedicels 0.4–1 cm (0.16–0.39 in) long. The standard petal is 14.5–17 mm (0.57–0.67 in) long and 11.8–17.3 mm (0.46–0.68 in) wide, the wings are 11.5–13.5 mm (0.45–0.53 in) long and 5.6 mm (0.22 in) wide, and the keel 7–7.7 mm (0.28–0.30 in) long and 2.4–2.9 mm (0.094–0.114 in) wide and has a whitish centre flare. Flowering occurs from June to October and the fruit is an oval, smooth pod, 0.9–1.1 cm (0.35–0.43 in) long and 0.9–1 cm (0.35–0.39 in) wide.

== Taxonomy ==
Hovea stricta was first formally described in 1844 by the botanist Carl Meisner and the description was published in the Leguminosae section of Lehmann's work Plantae Preissianae. The specific epithet (stricta) means "erect".

== Distribution and habitat ==
This hovea occurs on low hills, breakaways and flat plains along the coastal areas of the South West, Peel and Wheatbelt regions of Western Australia where it grows in sandy lateritic soils, heath and sand plains.
