= Hovea corrickiae =

Scientific classification
- Kingdom: Plantae
- Clade: Tracheophytes
- Clade: Angiosperms
- Clade: Eudicots
- Clade: Rosids
- Order: Fabales
- Family: Fabaceae
- Subfamily: Faboideae
- Genus: Hovea
- Species: H. corrickiae

Binomial name
- Hovea corrickiae J.H.Ross

Species of legume

Hovea corrickiae is a species of flowering plant in the family Fabaceae and is endemic to south-eastern Australia. It is a shrub or slender tree with densely hairy branchlets, narrowly egg-shaped or elliptic, dark green leaves with stipules at the base, and mostly pale to deep mauve, pea-like flowers.

== Description ==
Hovea corrickiae is a slender shrub or tree that typically grows to a height of up to 5 m (16 ft), its branchlets densely hairy. The leaves are narrowly egg-shaped to elliptic, mostly 30–114 mm (1.2–4.5 in) long and 7–20 mm (0.28–0.79 in) wide with stipules up to 1.2 mm (0.047 in) long at the base. The upper surface of the leaves is glossy dark green, the lower surface densely hairy. The flowers are usually arranged in pairs or threes, each flower on a pedicel 5.0–9.5 mm (0.20–0.37 in) long with bracteoles at the base of the sepals and bracts 1–2 mm (0.039–0.079 in) long below. The sepals are joined at the base, the two upper lobes 6.0–6.5 mm (0.24–0.26 in) long, the three lower lobes 2.5–3.5 mm (0.098–0.138 in) long. The standard petal is white or pale to deep mauve and 9.5–10.5 mm (0.37–0.41 in) long, 11–13 mm (0.43–0.51 in) wide, the wings, 8.5–10 mm (0.33–0.39 in) long and the keel 5.7–6.5 mm (0.22–0.26 in) long. Flowering occurs from September to October and the fruit is an oval or elliptic pod 10–20 mm (0.39–0.79 in) long.

== Taxonomy and naming ==
Hovea corrickiae was first formally described in 1990 by James Henderson Ross in the journal Muelleria from specimens collected in the Western Grampians by Margaret Georgina Corrick in 1983. The specific epithet (corrickiae) honours the collector of the type specimens.

== Distribution and habitat ==
This species of pea grows in open forest with a dense shrub layer and occurs in scattered populations in north-eastern Tasmania and in high rainfall areas in and near the Grampians in Victoria.
