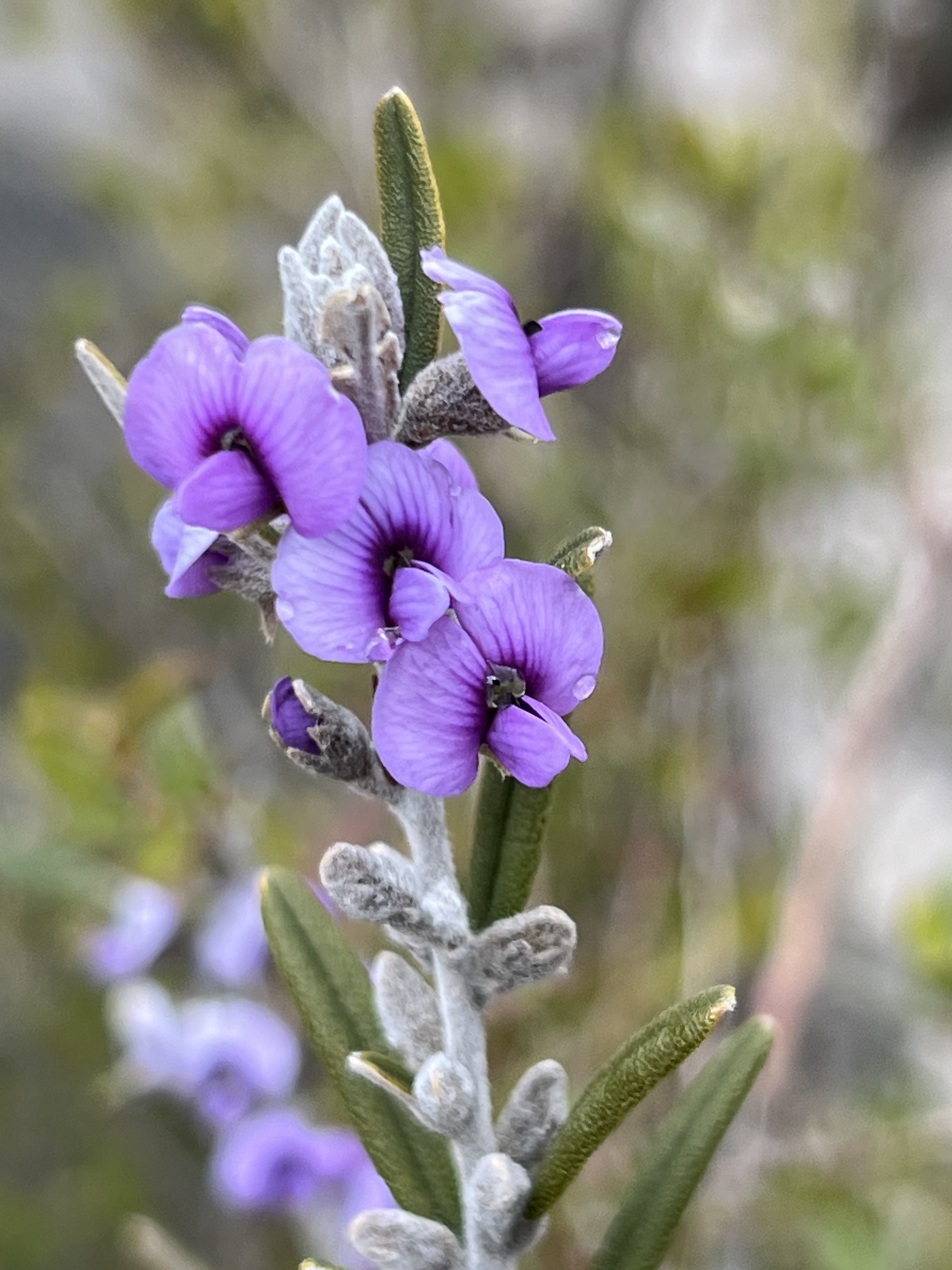

Scientific classification
- Kingdom: Plantae
- Clade: Tracheophytes
- Clade: Angiosperms
- Clade: Eudicots
- Clade: Rosids
- Order: Fabales
- Family: Fabaceae
- Subfamily: Faboideae
- Genus: Hovea
- Species: H. rosmarinifolia

Binomial name
- Hovea rosmarinifolia A.Cunn.

Synonyms
- Hovea longifolia var. ramulosa (Lindl.) Domin; Hovea rosmarinifolia A.Cunn. var. rosmarinifolia

= Hovea rosmarinifolia =

Mountain beauty

Species of legume

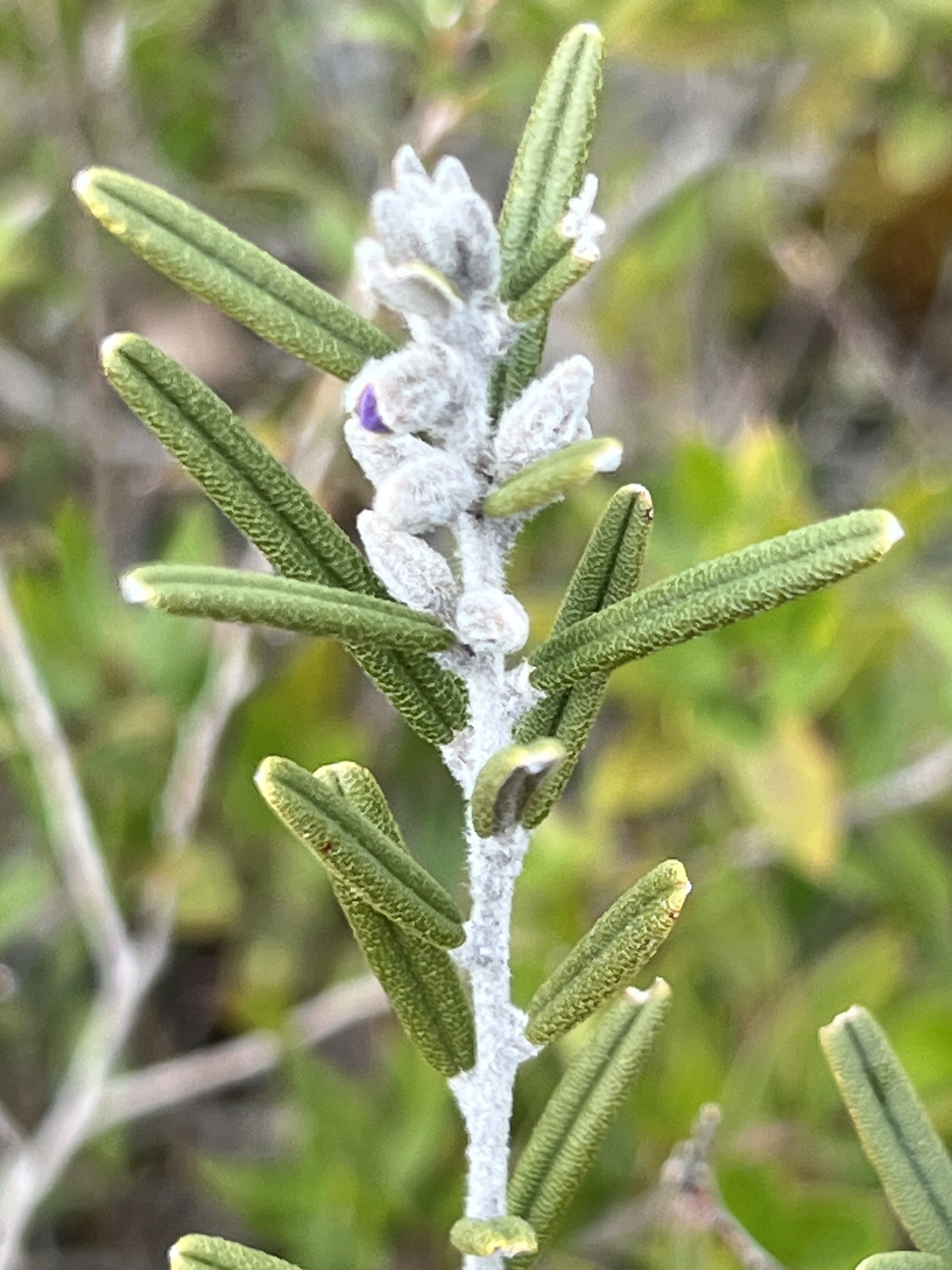
Foliage

Hovea rosmarinifolia, commonly known as mountain beauty or rosemary hovea is a shrub in the family Fabaceae, native to Australia. A small shrub bearing attractive blue-purple or mauve pea flowers from August to November.

== Description ==
Hovea rosmarinifolia is a shrub to 1.5 m (4.9 ft) high. The stems and branches are thickly covered in brownish coloured soft hairs that may be wrinkled, curly or straight. Leaves are long and narrow 1–4 cm (0.4–2 in) long and 1.2–4 mm (0.047–0.16 in) wide either rounded or squared at the apex. The leaves are a deep green above, paler on the underside and arch downward on either side of the midrib. The surface is either smooth or sparsely covered in rough hairs with a network of prominent raised veins. The leaf underside has curled or wrinkled brownish hairs completely covering the leaf blade. The leaf stipules are narrowly egg-shaped, generally hairy and 0.5–1.2 mm (0.020–0.047 in) long. The sessile inflorescence consists of 1 or 2 mauve flowers on a stalk 0.5–2 mm (0.020–0.079 in) long. The flower bracts are egg-shaped to narrowly egg-shaped 1–1.5 mm (0.039–0.059 in) long. The sepals are 3–4 mm (0.12–0.16 in) long, the mauve petals at the back of the flower 5–7 mm (0.20–0.28 in) long and similarly as wide. The mauve keel is shorter than the petals of the flower. Flowers appear from August to November followed by egg-shaped seed pods 5–7 mm (0.20–0.28 in) long that are densely covered in rusty coloured soft hairs.

== Taxonomy and naming ==
Hovea rosmarinifolia was first formally described by Allan Cunningham in 1825 and published in Geographical Memoirs of New South Wales. The specific epithet (rosmarinifolia) is derived from the Latin words rosmarinus meaning "rosemary" and folium meaning "leaf".

== Distribution and habitat ==
Rosemary hovea grows from Lithgow, Cowra and north to Gilgandra in New South Wales. An understory shrub growing in scrubland or sheltered gullies on poor free draining sandy soils. Also grows in scattered locations in Victoria and the Australian Capital Territory.

== Conservation status ==
Hovea rosmarinifolia is believed to be confined in Victoria to the dry rocky woodlands of Mount Difficult in the Grampians and is classified as "vulnerable" due to its restricted distribution.
