= Hovea nana =

Scientific classification
- Kingdom: Plantae
- Clade: Tracheophytes
- Clade: Angiosperms
- Clade: Eudicots
- Clade: Rosids
- Order: Fabales
- Family: Fabaceae
- Subfamily: Faboideae
- Genus: Hovea
- Species: H. nana

Binomial name
- Hovea nana I.Thomps. & J.H.Ross

Species of legume

Hovea nana is a species of flowering plant in the family Fabaceae and is endemic to Queensland, Australia. It is a subshrub with trailing stems, very narrowly elliptic to strap-shaped leaves, mauve flowers and a sessile pod.

== Description ==
Hovea nana is a subshrub with trailing stems and that typically grows to a height of up to 50 cm (20 in), many parts covered with grey hairs. The leaves are very narrowly elliptic or strap-shaped to linear, 15–45 mm (0.59–1.77 in) long and 2–3.3 mm (0.079–0.130 in) wide with stipules 1–2 mm (0.039–0.079 in) long at the base. The flowers are usually arranged in pairs, each flower on a pedicel 1.5–1.8 mm (0.059–0.071 in) long, with a narrowly egg-shaped bracts and bracteoles 1–2 mm (0.039–0.079 in) long at the base. The sepals are 4.5–5.2 mm (0.18–0.20 in) long and joined at the base, forming a tube 2.2–2.5 mm (0.087–0.098 in) long, the upper lip 3.5–4.0 mm (0.14–0.16 in) wide. The petals are mauve, the standard petal about 9 mm (0.35 in) long with a central yellow "flare", the wings 3.0–3.5 mm (0.12–0.14 in) wide. Flowering occurs in most months and the pods are sessile and densely hairy, the seed with an aril 2.8 mm (0.11 in) long.

== Taxonomy ==
Hovea nana was first formally described in 2001 by Ian R. Thompson and James Henderson Ross in Australian Systematic Botany from specimens collected 1 km (0.62 mi) north of Herberton in 1983. The specific epithet (nana) means 'dwarf'.

== Distribution and habitat ==
This species of pea grows on rocky hillsides in woodland near Herberton.

== Conservation status ==
Hovea nana is listed as of "least concern" under the Queensland Government Nature Conservation Act 1992.
