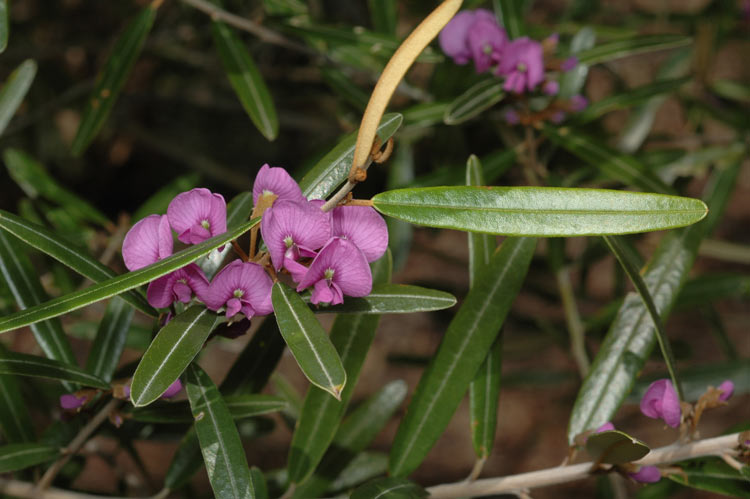
- In the Australian National Botanic Gardens

Scientific classification
- Kingdom: Plantae
- Clade: Tracheophytes
- Clade: Angiosperms
- Clade: Eudicots
- Clade: Rosids
- Order: Fabales
- Family: Fabaceae
- Subfamily: Faboideae
- Genus: Hovea
- Species: H. lorata

Binomial name
- Hovea lorata I.Thomps.

= Hovea lorata =

Species of legume

Hovea lorata, is a species of flowering plant in the family Fabaceae and is endemic to eastern Australia. It is a shrub with lorate (strap-shaped) leaves, and mauve and greenish-yellow, pea-like flowers.

== Description ==
Hovea lorata is a shrub that typically grows to a height of up to 3 m (9.8 ft), with many parts covered with brownish hairs. The leaves are strap-shaped, 25–55 mm (0.98–2.17 in) long and 3.5–8.5 mm (0.14–0.33 in) wide with stipules 0.5–1 mm (0.020–0.039 in) long at the base. The flowers are usually arranged in groups of two or three on a peduncle up to 4.5 mm (0.18 in) long, each flower on a pedicel 2–14 mm (0.079–0.551 in) long. The flowers have egg-shaped bracts 0.7–1.6 mm (0.028–0.063 in) long and slightly larger bracteoles at the base. The sepals are joined at the base, forming a tube 2.2–2.7 mm (0.087–0.106 in) long, the upper lip 2.2–2.8 mm (0.087–0.110 in) wide and the lower lip 3–4 mm (0.12–0.16 in) wide. The petals are mauve, the standard petal 6–8.2 mm (0.24–0.32 in) long, 7–9.7 mm (0.28–0.38 in) wide and mauve with a greenish-yellow base surrounded by a deep mauve border, the wings 5.7–6.3 mm (0.22–0.25 in) long and the keel 5.0–5.6 mm (0.20–0.22 in) long. Flowering occurs from July to October and the fruit is a more or less round pod 10–15 mm (0.39–0.59 in) long and 8–14 mm (0.31–0.55 in) wide.

== Taxonomy and naming ==
Hovea lorata was first formally described in 2001 by Ian R. Thompson in Australian Systematic Botany from specimens collected by James Henderson Ross near Goombungee in 1986.

== Distribution and habitat ==
This species of pea grows in forest and woodland on sandy or rocky soils and occurs from south-eastern Queensland to the Mount Royal Range in New South Wales, with an outlier near Longreach in central Queensland.
