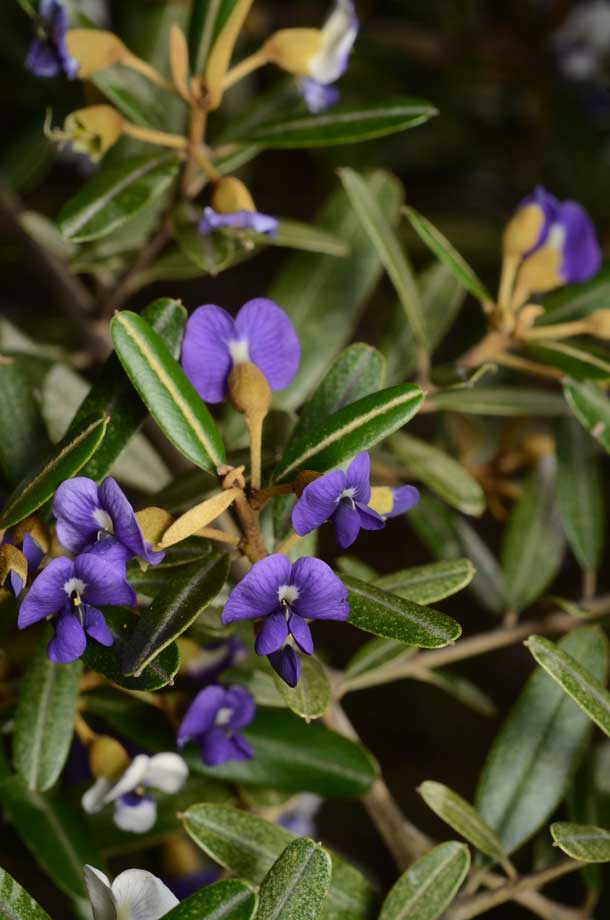
- At Carrabak Conservation Park, near Roma

Scientific classification
- Kingdom: Plantae
- Clade: Tracheophytes
- Clade: Angiosperms
- Clade: Eudicots
- Clade: Rosids
- Order: Fabales
- Family: Fabaceae
- Subfamily: Faboideae
- Genus: Hovea
- Species: H. longipes

Binomial name
- Hovea longipes Benth.

Synonyms
- Hovea leiocarpa Benth.

= Hovea longipes =

Species of legume

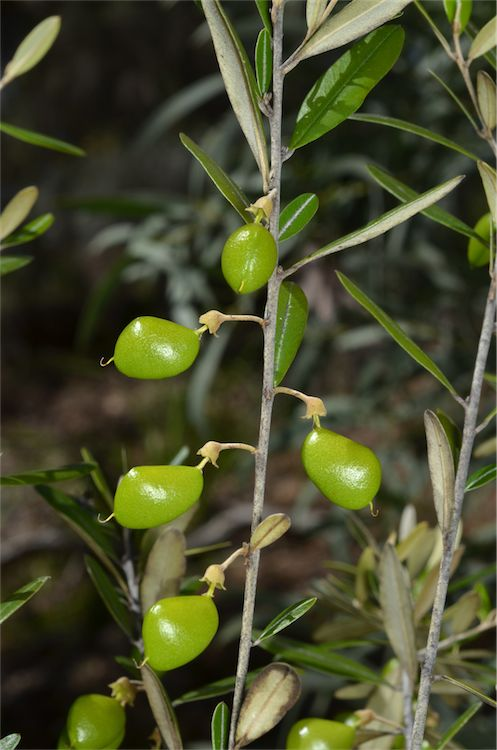
Fruit

Hovea longipes is a species of flowering plant in the family Fabaceae and is endemic to north-eastern Australia. It is a shrub or tree with narrowly elliptic to lance-shaped leaves, and deep indigo-blue and white, pea-like flowers.

== Description ==
Hovea longipes is a shrub or tree that typically grows to a height of up to 5 m (16 ft), with many parts densely covered with yellow, tan or grey hairs, and with red glandular structures near the leaves and bracts. The leaves are narrowly elliptic to lance-shaped, 15–50 mm (0.59–1.97 in) long and 5–20 mm (0.20–0.79 in) wide on a petiole 2–5 mm (0.079–0.197 in) long but without stipules. The flowers are usually arranged in groups of 2 or 3, each flower sessile or on a pedicel 3–10 mm (0.12–0.39 in) long with narrowly oblong bracts and bracteoles 0.5–1 mm (0.020–0.039 in) long at the base. The flowers are deep indigo-blue, the standard petal 5–10 mm (0.20–0.39 in) long and 5–11 mm (0.20–0.43 in) wide with a white centre. The wings are 6–8 mm (0.24–0.31 in) long and the keel 5–6 mm (0.20–0.24 in) long. Flowering occurs from March to September and the fruit is an irregular spherical pod 10–15 mm (0.39–0.59 in) long and wide.

== Taxonomy and naming ==
Hovea longipes was first formally described in 1837 by George Bentham in Stephan Endlicher's Enumeratio plantarum quas in Novae Hollandiae ora austro-occidentali ad fluvium Cygnorum et in sinu Regis Georgii collegit Carolus Liber Baro de Hügel.

== Distribution and habitat ==
This species of pea grows in rainforest, scrub and woodland on sandy soils from near the Iron Range National Park in north Queensland to Lake Glenbawn in north-eastern New South Wales.
