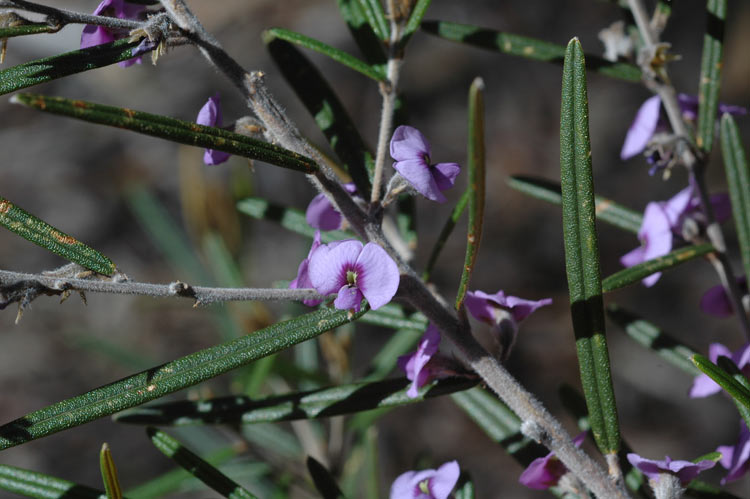

Scientific classification
- Kingdom: Plantae
- Clade: Embryophytes
- Clade: Tracheophytes
- Clade: Angiosperms
- Clade: Eudicots
- Clade: Rosids
- Order: Fabales
- Family: Fabaceae
- Subfamily: Faboideae
- Genus: Hovea
- Species: H. similis

Binomial name
- Hovea similis I.Thomps.

= Hovea similis =

Species of legume

Hovea similis is a species of flowering plant in the family Fabaceae. It is endemic to Australia, in the states of New South Wales and Queensland. It is a shrub or small tree with hairy foliage and mauve and yellowish-green pea-like flowers.

== Description ==
Hovea similis is a shrub or small tree that typically grows to a height of up to 4 m (13 ft), its foliage and most external surfaces are covered with brownish to grey hairs. The leaves are strap-like to elliptic-strap shaped, 2.5–8 cm (0.98–3.15 in) long, 4–9 mm (0.16–0.35 in) wide, flat to slightly arched, base pointed or rounded, margins rolled under or bent and the midrib moderately recessed. The leaf upper surface is dull to almost shiny, smooth, veined, rounded to blunt or rarely with a short point at the apex and lance-shaped stipules 1.3–1.8 mm (0.051–0.071 in). The lower surface has dense orange-brown curled hairs with long, interspersed white hairs. The flowers are borne in a group of 1–3, bracteoles 1.2–2.5 mm (0.047–0.098 in) long, narrowly egg-shaped to lance-shaped, calyx 4–5 mm (0.16–0.20 in) long. The floral tube 2.5–2.7 mm (0.098–0.106 in) long, the standard petal is mauve with a yellowish-green base and about 8–11 mm (0.31–0.43 in) wide, wings are 5–7.5 mm (0.20–0.30 in) long and 2–3.5 mm (0.079–0.138 in) wide. Flowering occurs from August to September and the fruit is a pod about 15 mm (0.59 in) long and 10 mm (0.39 in) deep.

== Taxonomy ==
Hovea similis was first formally described in 2001 by Ian R. Thompson in Australian Systematic Botany from specimens collected near the McPherson Range Queensland in 1990.

== Distribution and habitat ==
This species grows in coastal sand and inland in forests near the Queensland border and New South Wales south to Taree.
