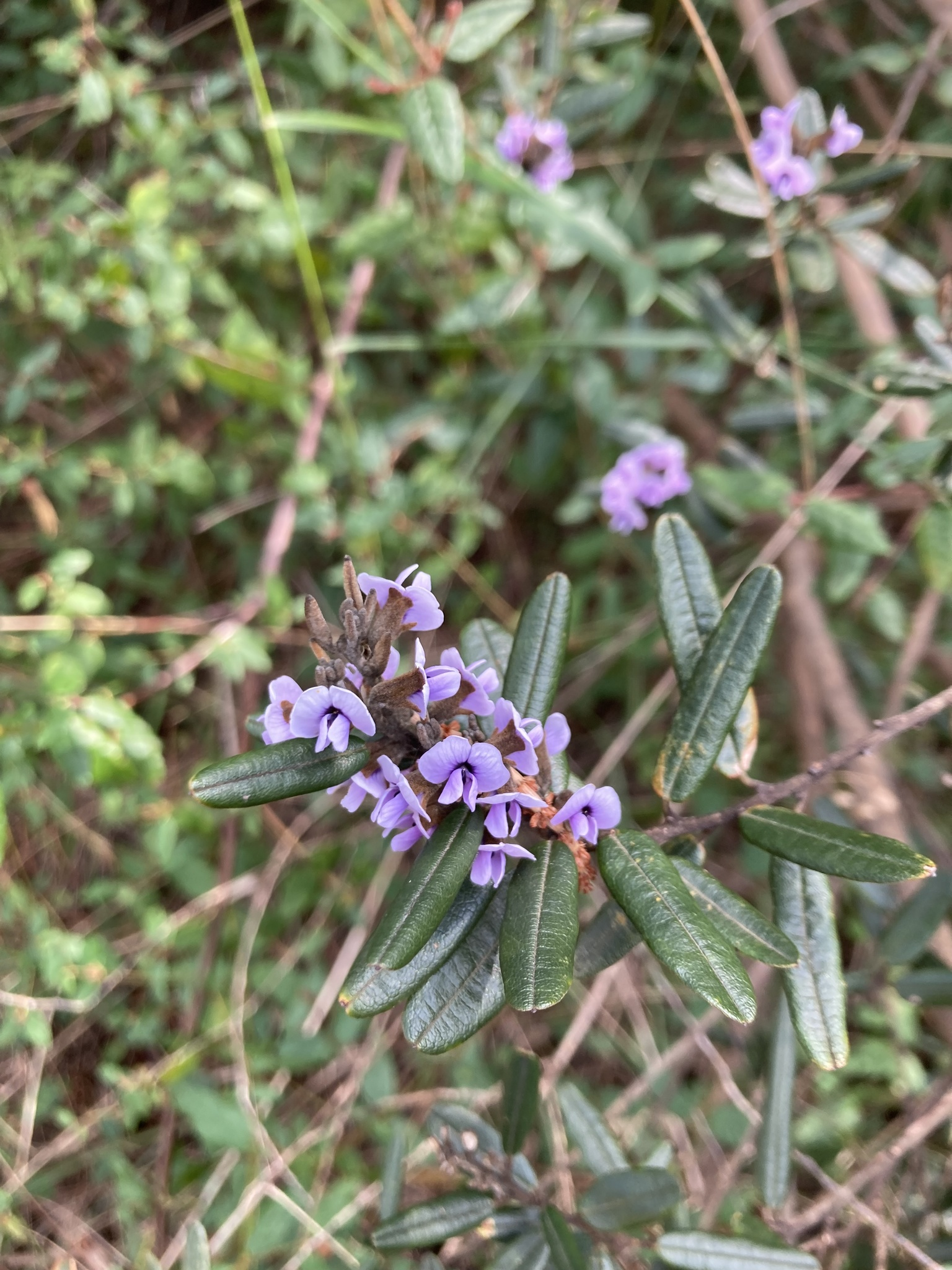
- Near Cataract Gorge

Scientific classification
- Kingdom: Plantae
- Clade: Tracheophytes
- Clade: Angiosperms
- Clade: Eudicots
- Clade: Rosids
- Order: Fabales
- Family: Fabaceae
- Subfamily: Faboideae
- Genus: Hovea
- Species: H. tasmanica

Binomial name
- Hovea tasmanica I.Thomps. & J.H.Ross

= Hovea tasmanica =

Species of flowering plant

Hovea tasmanica is a flowering plant in the family Fabaceae, endemic to Tasmania, Australia. It is a shrub with very narrowly elliptic or narrowly oblong or strap-like leaves, groups of two or three mauve pea flowers, and moderately hairy, sessile pods.

== Description ==
Hovea tasmanica is a shrub that typically grows to a height of up to 3 m (9.8 ft) and is covered with brown to grey, often coiled or curved hairs. The leaves are very narrowly elliptic or narrowly oblong to strap-shaped, 15–50 mm (0.59–1.97 in) long and 4–9 mm (0.16–0.35 in) wide on a petiole 3–5 mm (0.12–0.20 in) long. There are stipules 0.5–1.0 mm (0.020–0.039 in) long at the base of the petioles. The flowers are mostly borne in groups of two or three on a peduncle 0.5–4 mm (0.020–0.157 in) long, each flower on a pedicel 1.5–3 mm (0.059–0.118 in) long, with egg-shaped bracts and bracteoles 0.7–2 mm (0.028–0.079 in) long at the base. The sepals are 4–6 mm (0.16–0.24 in) long and joined at the base, forming a tube 2.5–3.2 mm (0.098–0.126 in) long, the upper lip about 3 mm (0.12 in) wide. The petals are mauve, the standard petal 7.8–9 mm (0.31–0.35 in) long with a central purple "flare", the wings 2.8–3.4 mm (0.11–0.13 in) wide. Flowering occurs in September and October and the pods are sessile and moderately hairy, the seed with an aril about 4 mm (0.16 in) long.

== Taxonomy and naming ==
Hovea tasmanica was first formally described in 2001 by I.R. Thompson and the description was published in Australian Systematic Botany.

== Distribution and habitat ==
This hovea grows on dry rocky ridges of slopes in forest or scrub in central and north-eastern Tasmania.
