= Hovea angustissima =

Scientific classification
- Kingdom: Plantae
- Clade: Tracheophytes
- Clade: Angiosperms
- Clade: Eudicots
- Clade: Rosids
- Order: Fabales
- Family: Fabaceae
- Subfamily: Faboideae
- Genus: Hovea
- Species: H. angustissima

Binomial name
- Hovea angustissima I.Thomps.

Species of legume

Hovea angustissima, is a species of flowering plant in the family Fabaceae. It is a shrub with narrowly linear leaves, groups of two or three violet-purple flowers and hairy pods. It grows in south-eastern Queensland, Australia.

== Description ==
Hovea angustissima is a shrub that typically grows to a height of up to 2 m (6 ft 7 in), and is covered with coiled, grey hairs. The leaves are narrowly linear, 40–90 mm (1.6–3.5 in) long and 1.5–2.5 mm (0.059–0.098 in) wide, the edges rolled under, the upper surface with slightly raised veins and hairs along the midrib. Two or three flowers are borne in sessile groups, each flower on a pedicel 1–2 mm (0.039–0.079 in) long with a bract and narrowly egg-shaped bracteoles 1.0–1.5 mm (0.039–0.059 in) long at the base. The sepals are 3.5–4.0 mm (0.14–0.16 in) long, forming a tube 2.0–2.5 mm (0.079–0.098 in) long, the upper lip about 3 mm (0.12 in) long. The standard petal is 6–7 mm (0.24–0.28 in) long and violet-purple with a central greenish-yellow "flare", and the wing is 2.0–2.5 mm (0.079–0.098 in) wide. Flowering occurs form July to August and the fruit is a hairy, sessile pod.

== Taxonomy and naming ==
Hovea angustissima was first formally described in 2001 by Ian R. Thompson and the description was published in Australian Systematic Botany from specimens collected 15 km (9.3 mi) east-south-east of Inglewood on the Pikedale Road in 1986. The specific epithet (angustissima) means 'very narrow' or 'narrowest'.

== Distribution and habitat ==
This species grows in sandy soils in forest and woodland in south-eastern Queensland between Salvator Rosa National Park and Inglewood.

== Conservation status ==
Hovea angustissima is listed as of "least concern" under the Queensland Government Nature Conservation Act 1992.
