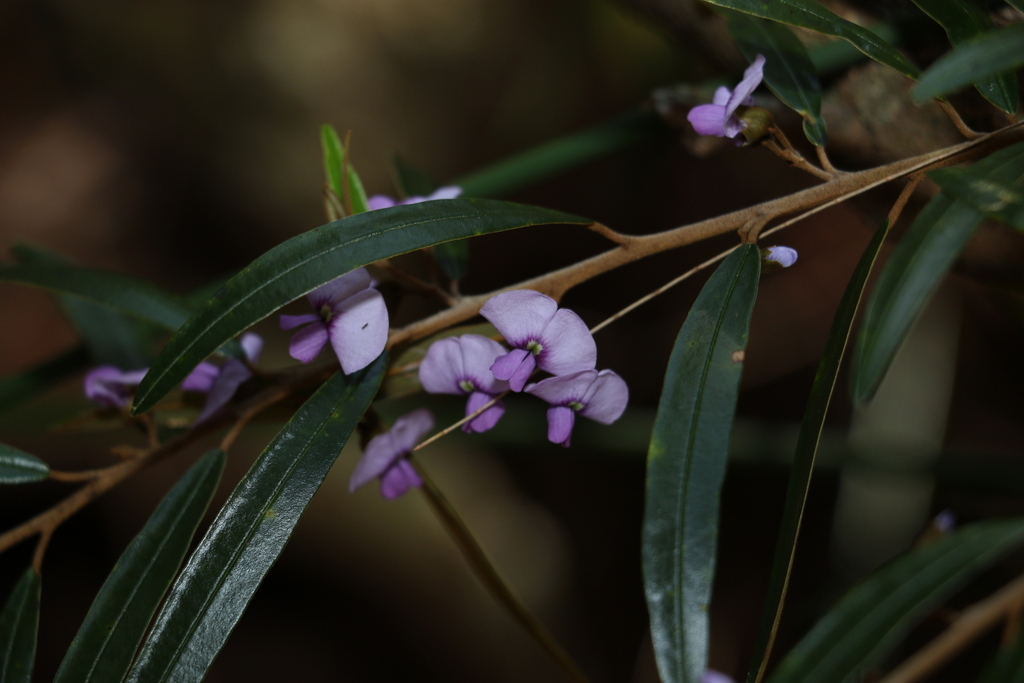
- Near Binna Burra

Scientific classification
- Kingdom: Plantae
- Clade: Tracheophytes
- Clade: Angiosperms
- Clade: Eudicots
- Clade: Rosids
- Order: Fabales
- Family: Fabaceae
- Subfamily: Faboideae
- Genus: Hovea
- Species: H. impressinerva

Binomial name
- Hovea impressinerva I.Thomps.

= Hovea impressinerva =

Species of legume

Hovea impressinerva is a species of flowering plant in the family Fabaceae and is endemic to south-eastern continental Australia. It is a shrub or small tree many parts covered with dense, golden brown hairs, the leaves strap shaped to very narrowly elliptic with stipules at the base, and mauve, pea-like flowers.

== Description ==
Hovea impressinerva is a shrub or small tree that typically grows to a height of up to 4 m (13 ft), many parts densely covered with curled, golden brown hairs. The leaves are strap-shaped to very narrowly elliptic, 30–80 mm (1.2–3.1 in) long, 5–16 mm (0.20–0.63 in) wide on a petiole up to 5.5 mm (0.22 in) long with egg-shaped stipules about 1 mm (0.039 in) long at the base. The upper surface of the leaves is more or less glabrous and glossy green, the lower surface covered with curled, golden hairs on the veins. The flowers are arranged in groups of three on a peduncle 1.5–4.5 mm (0.059–0.177 in) long with oblong to egg-shaped bracts 1–2 mm (0.039–0.079 in) long and oblong to narrowly egg-shaped bracteoles 1.2–2.2 mm (0.047–0.087 in) long at the base. The sepals are 4.5–5.0 mm (0.18–0.20 in) long forming a tube 2.5–2.8 mm (0.098–0.110 in) long. The standard petal is mauve with a greenish yellow centre, and 8–9 mm (0.31–0.35 in) long, 11–12 mm (0.43–0.47 in) wide. The wings are 7–8 mm (0.28–0.31 in) long and 2.5–4.0 mm (0.098–0.157 in) wide, and the keel 5.5–5.0 mm (0.22–0.20 in) long and 2.0–2.7 mm (0.079–0.106 in) wide. Flowering occurs in July and August, and the fruit is a round or broadly elliptic pod 10–17 mm (0.39–0.67 in) long, 9–12 mm (0.35–0.47 in) deep and sessile and covered with brown, crumpled hairs. The seeds are elliptic with a narrowly oblong aril extending for about 90% of the length of the seed.

== Taxonomy and naming ==
Hovea impressinerva was first formally described in 2001 by Ian R. Thompson in Australian Systematic Botany from specimens collected near the Lake Moogerah to Mount Alford road in 1988.

== Distribution and habitat ==
This species of pea grows in forest in far south-eastern Queensland, south and south-west of Brisbane, and on Mount Warning in far north-eastern New South Wales.
