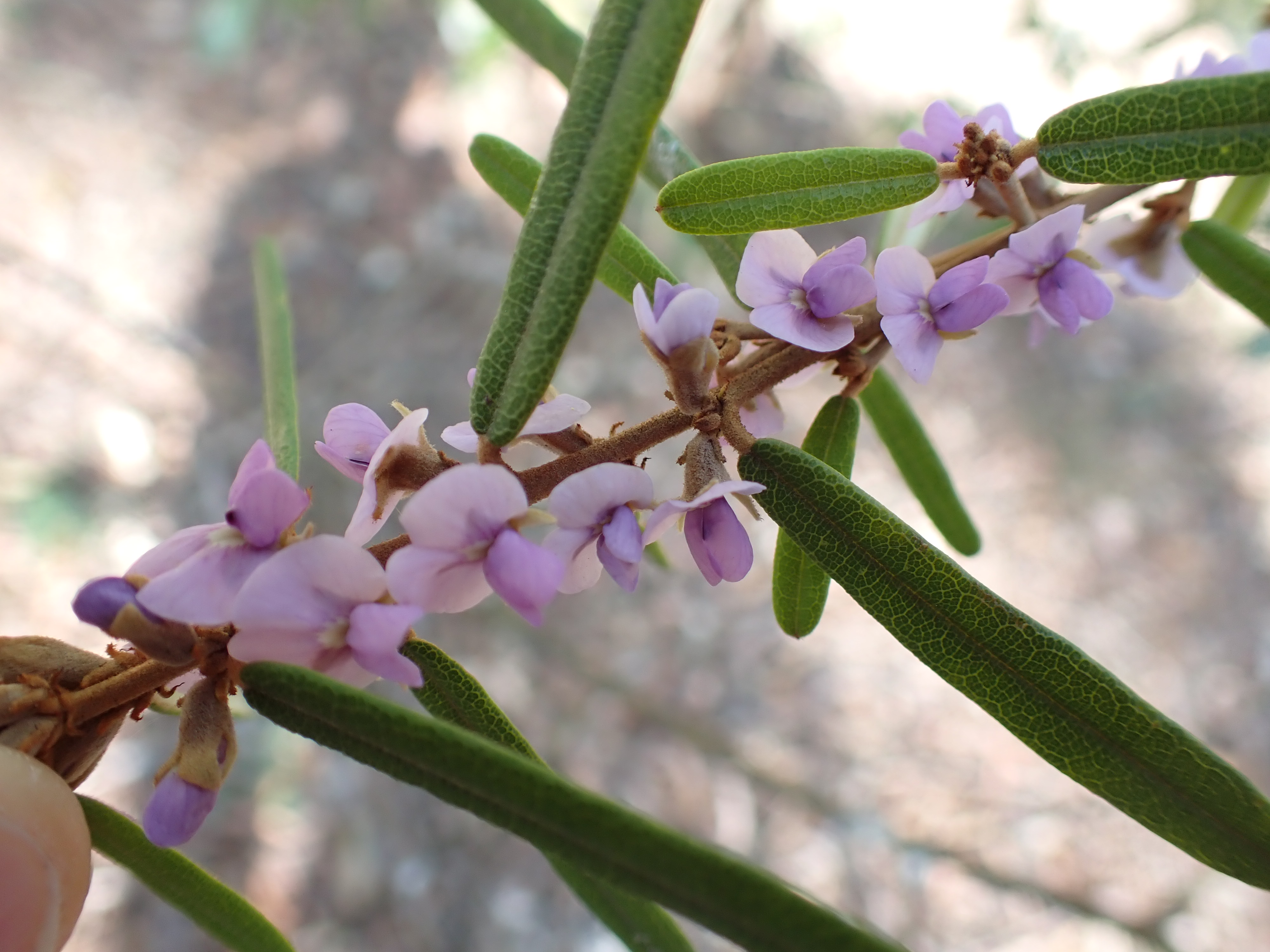
- In Mount Coot-tha Botanic Gardens

Scientific classification
- Kingdom: Plantae
- Clade: Tracheophytes
- Clade: Angiosperms
- Clade: Eudicots
- Clade: Rosids
- Order: Fabales
- Family: Fabaceae
- Subfamily: Faboideae
- Genus: Hovea
- Species: H. densivellosa

Binomial name
- Hovea densivellosa I.Thomps.

= Hovea densivellosa =

Species of legume

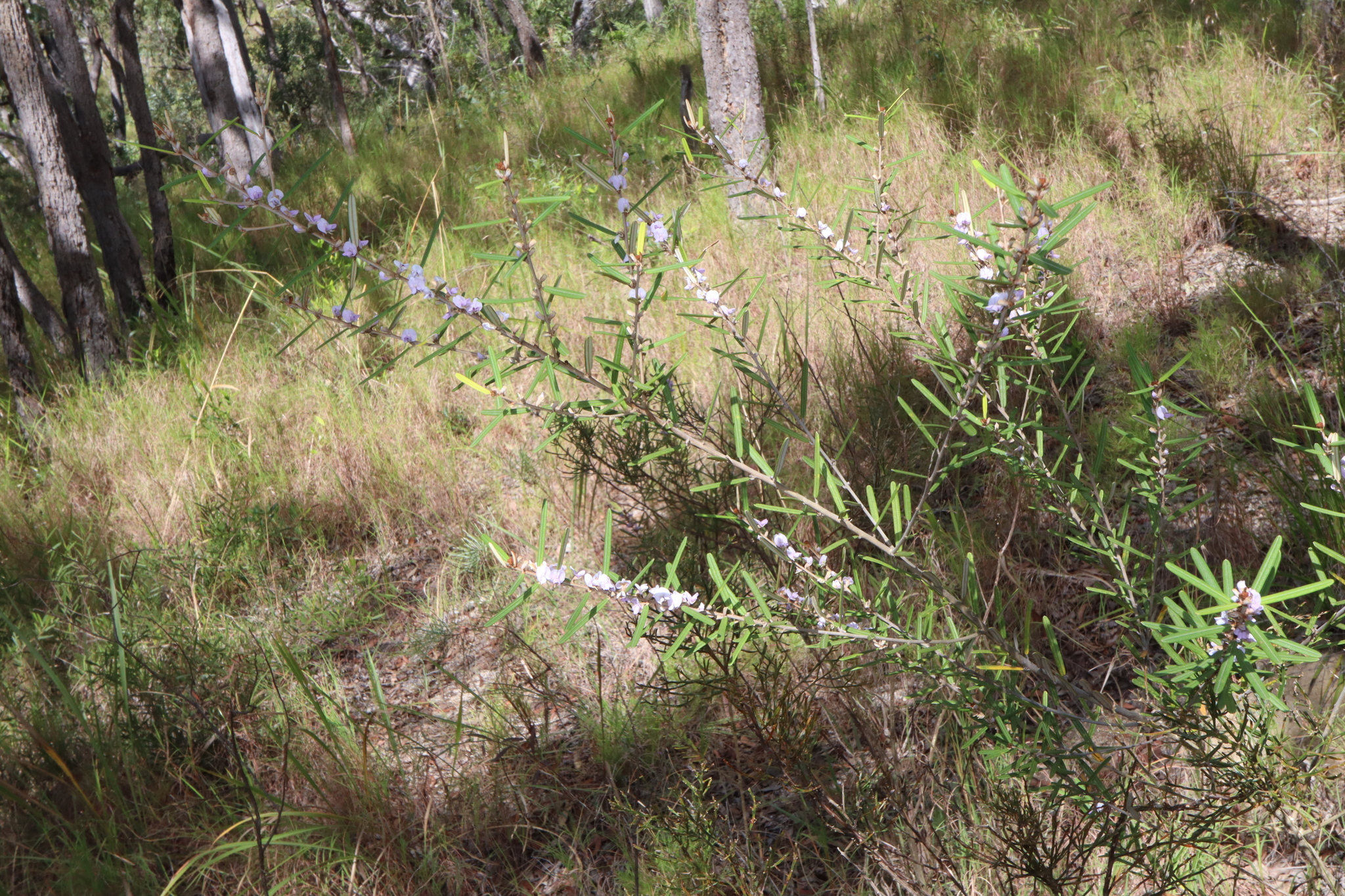
Hovea densivellosa growing near Mareeba Queensland

Hovea densivellosa, is a species of flowering plant in the family Fabaceae and is endemic to Queensland.

== Description ==
Hovea densivellosa is a shrub that grows to a height of up to 2.5 m (8 ft 2 in).

== Taxonomy ==
Hovea densivellosa was first formally described in 2001 by Ian R. Thompson in Australian Systematic Botany from specimens collected in the Hinchinbrook Channel National Park north of Ingham, by Anthony Bean in 1991. The specific epithet (densivellosa) refers to the depth of the indumentum which is particularly apparent on the under side of the leaves.

== Distribution and habitat ==
Hovea densivellosa grows in forest on slopes or flat terrain on granite and occurs predominantly in northern Queensland between the Windsor Tableland north of Cairns and Ingham to the south with other disjunct occurrences.
