= Hovea cymbiformis =

Scientific classification
- Kingdom: Plantae
- Clade: Tracheophytes
- Clade: Angiosperms
- Clade: Eudicots
- Clade: Rosids
- Order: Fabales
- Family: Fabaceae
- Subfamily: Faboideae
- Genus: Hovea
- Species: H. cymbiformis

Binomial name
- Hovea cymbiformis I.Thomps.

Species of legume

Hovea cymbiformis is a species of flowering plant in the family Fabaceae and is endemic to New South Wales. It is a shrub with foliage covered with brownish to grey hairs, narrowly elliptic leaves with stipules at the base, and mauve and yellowish-green, pea-like flowers.

== Description ==
Hovea cymbiformis is a shrub that typically grows to a height of up to 0.5 m (1 ft 8 in), its foliage covered with brownish to grey, curled or coiled hairs. The leaves are narrowly elliptic, 10–40 mm (0.39–1.57 in) long, 3–5 mm (0.12–0.20 in) wide on a petiole 1.5–3 mm (0.059–0.118 in) long with egg-shaped stipules 0.5–1.2 mm (0.020–0.047 in) long at the base. The flowers are usually arranged in pairs on short side-branches and are sessile with bracts and bracteoles 1.0–1.2 mm (0.039–0.047 in) long at the base. The sepals are 3.5–4.5 mm (0.14–0.18 in) long, the upper pair joined and 2.5–3.0 mm (0.098–0.118 in) wide, the three lower lobes 1.2–1.8 mm (0.047–0.071 in) long. The standard petal is mauve with a yellowish-green base and about 7 mm (0.28 in) long, 8–9 mm (0.31–0.35 in) wide and the wings are 6–7 mm (0.24–0.28 in) long. Flowering occurs from August to September and the fruit is a pod about 10 mm (0.39 in) long and wide.

== Taxonomy and naming ==
Hovea cymbiformis was first formally described in 2001 by Ian R. Thompson in Australian Systematic Botany from specimens collected near Attunga in 1997. The specific epithet (cymbiformis) means "boat-shaped".

== Distribution and habitat ==
This species of pea grows in woodland on soil derived from serpentinite, from near Barraba to near Chaffey Dam in north-eastern New South Wales.
