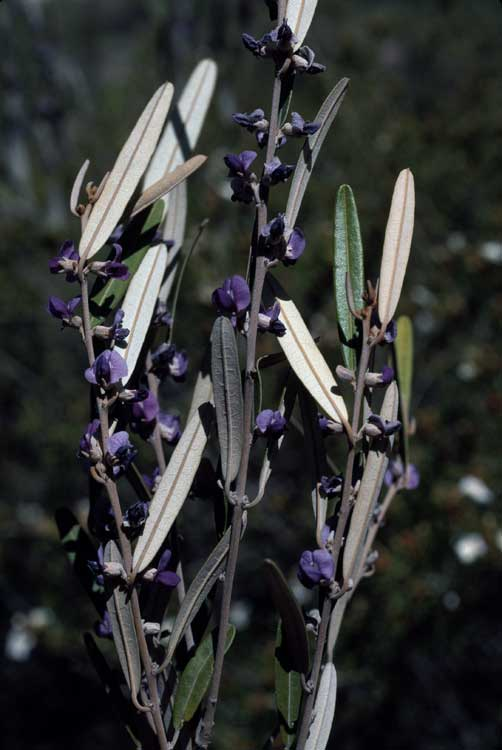

Scientific classification
- Kingdom: Plantae
- Clade: Tracheophytes
- Clade: Angiosperms
- Clade: Eudicots
- Clade: Rosids
- Order: Fabales
- Family: Fabaceae
- Subfamily: Faboideae
- Genus: Hovea
- Species: H. tholiformis

Binomial name
- Hovea tholiformis I.Thomps.

= Hovea tholiformis =

Species of flowering plant

Hovea tholiformis is a flowering plant in the family Fabaceae, endemic to eastern Queensland, Australia. It is a shrub with narrowly elliptic to narrowly oblong or strap-like leaves, groups of two or three mauve pea flowers, and densely hairy, sessile pods.

== Description ==
Hovea tholiformis is a shrub that typically grows to a height of up to 2 m (6 ft 7 in) and is covered with grey, coiled hairs. The leaves are narrowly elliptic or narrowly oblong, narrowly lance-shaped with the narrower end towards the base, to strap-shaped, 30–60 mm (1.2–2.4 in) long and 4–8.5 mm (0.16–0.33 in) wide on a petiole 3–5.5 mm (0.12–0.22 in) long. The upper surface of the leaves is more or less smooth and the edges are curved downwards. There are stipules 0.8–1.0 mm (0.031–0.039 in) long at the base of the petioles. The flowers are mostly borne in groups of two or three on a peduncle 1–2 mm (0.039–0.079 in) long, each flower on a pedicel 1.0–2.5 mm (0.039–0.098 in) long, with egg-shaped bracts and bracteoles 0.8–1.5 mm (0.031–0.059 in) long at the base. The sepals are 3.5–4.8 mm (0.14–0.19 in) long and joined at the base, forming a tube 2.2–2.7 mm (0.087–0.106 in) long, the upper lip about 3 mm (0.12 in) wide. The petals are mauve, the standard petal 7.5–8.3 mm (0.30–0.33 in) long with a central white "flare", the wings 3.0–3.8 mm (0.12–0.15 in) wide. Flowering occurs from June to August and the pods are densely hairy and sessile.

== Taxonomy and naming ==
Hovea tholiformis was first formally described in 2001 by Ian Thompson and the description was published in Australian Systematic Botany.

== Distribution and habitat ==
This hovea grows in sandy soils on rocky outcrops in woodland in eastern Queensland from 100 km (62 mi) west of Ingham to Westmar and Eidsvold.

== Conservation status ==
Hovea tholiformis is listed as of "least concern" under the Queensland Government Nature Conservation Act 1992.
