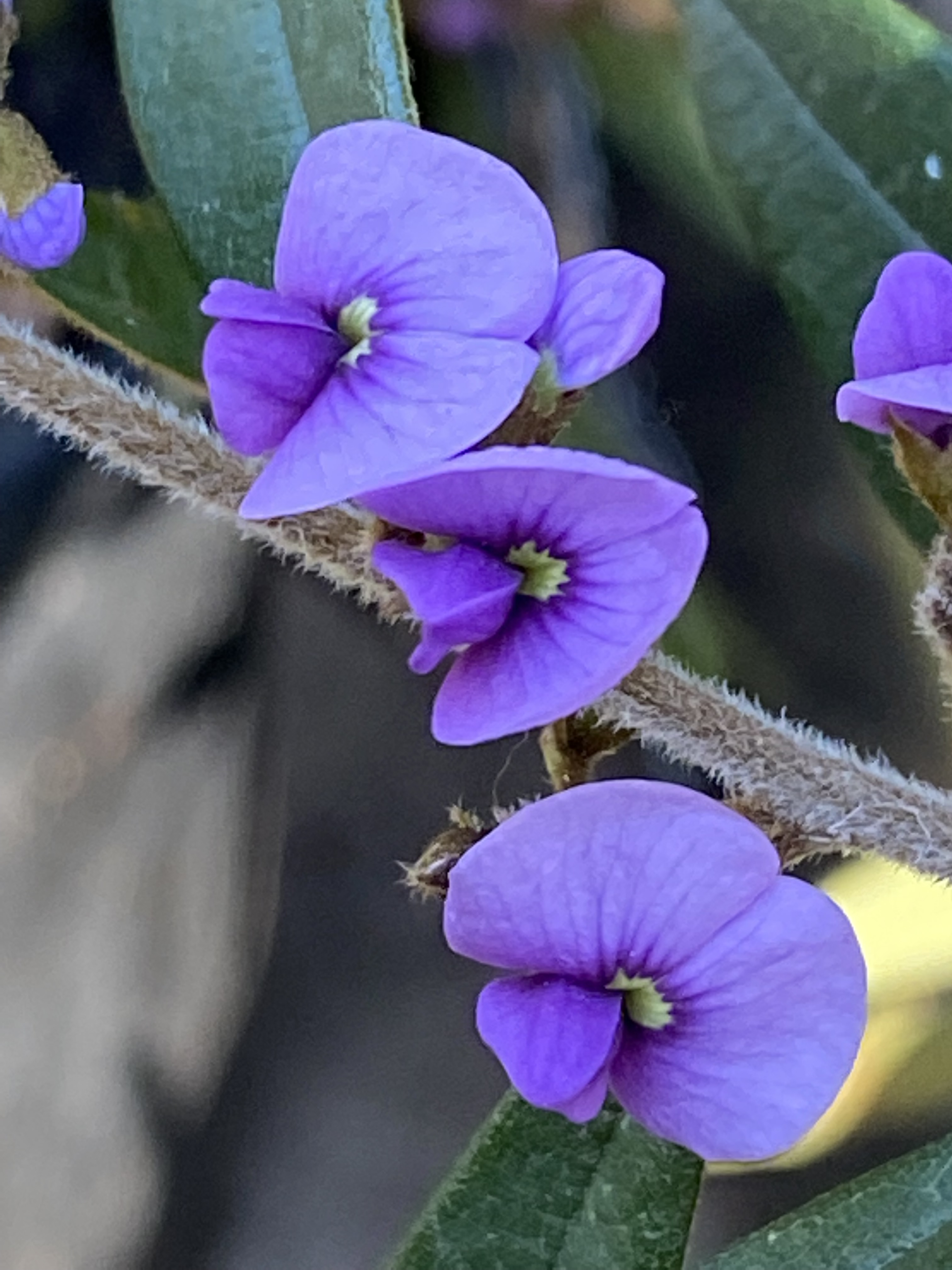

Scientific classification
- Kingdom: Plantae
- Clade: Tracheophytes
- Clade: Angiosperms
- Clade: Eudicots
- Clade: Rosids
- Order: Fabales
- Family: Fabaceae
- Subfamily: Faboideae
- Genus: Hovea
- Species: H. acutifolia

Binomial name
- Hovea acutifolia A.Cunn. ex G.Don

= Hovea acutifolia =

Species of legume

Hovea acutifolia, is a species of flowering plant in the family Fabaceae. It is an upright, small shrub with blue to purple pea flowers, dark green leaves and rusty coloured new growth. It grows in Queensland and New South Wales.

== Description ==
Hovea acutifolia is a bushy, slender shrub up to 4 m (13 ft) high, branches densely covered with a mixture of crinkled, wavy or straight grey to rusty hairs. The leaves are more or less narrow-elliptic, margins slightly turned under, 3–7 cm (1.2–2.8 in) long, 3–12 mm (0.12–0.47 in) wide, upper surface hairless with fine veins, lower surface brownish with soft hairs and tapering at the base and apex. The blue to purple pea inflorescence consists of 1-3 flowers borne in the leaf axils on a peduncle, single flowers on a pedicel 1.5–4 mm (0.059–0.157 in) long, calyx about 4–5 mm (0.16–0.20 in) long with loosely flattened hairs. The standard petal is 8–9 mm (0.31–0.35 in) long usually with yellow-greenish markings, the wings 7.5–9 mm (0.30–0.35 in) long and the keel 5–5.5 mm (0.20–0.22 in) long. Flowering occurs from late winter to early spring and the fruit is a pod about 15 mm (0.59 in) long, and sparsely covered with hairs.

== Taxonomy and naming ==
Hovea acutifolia was first formally described in 1832 by George Don and the description was published in A General History of Dichlamydeous. The specific epithet (acutifolia) means "acute-leaved".

== Distribution and habitat ==
This species grows in damp, protected rainforest margins in New South Wales and Queensland.
