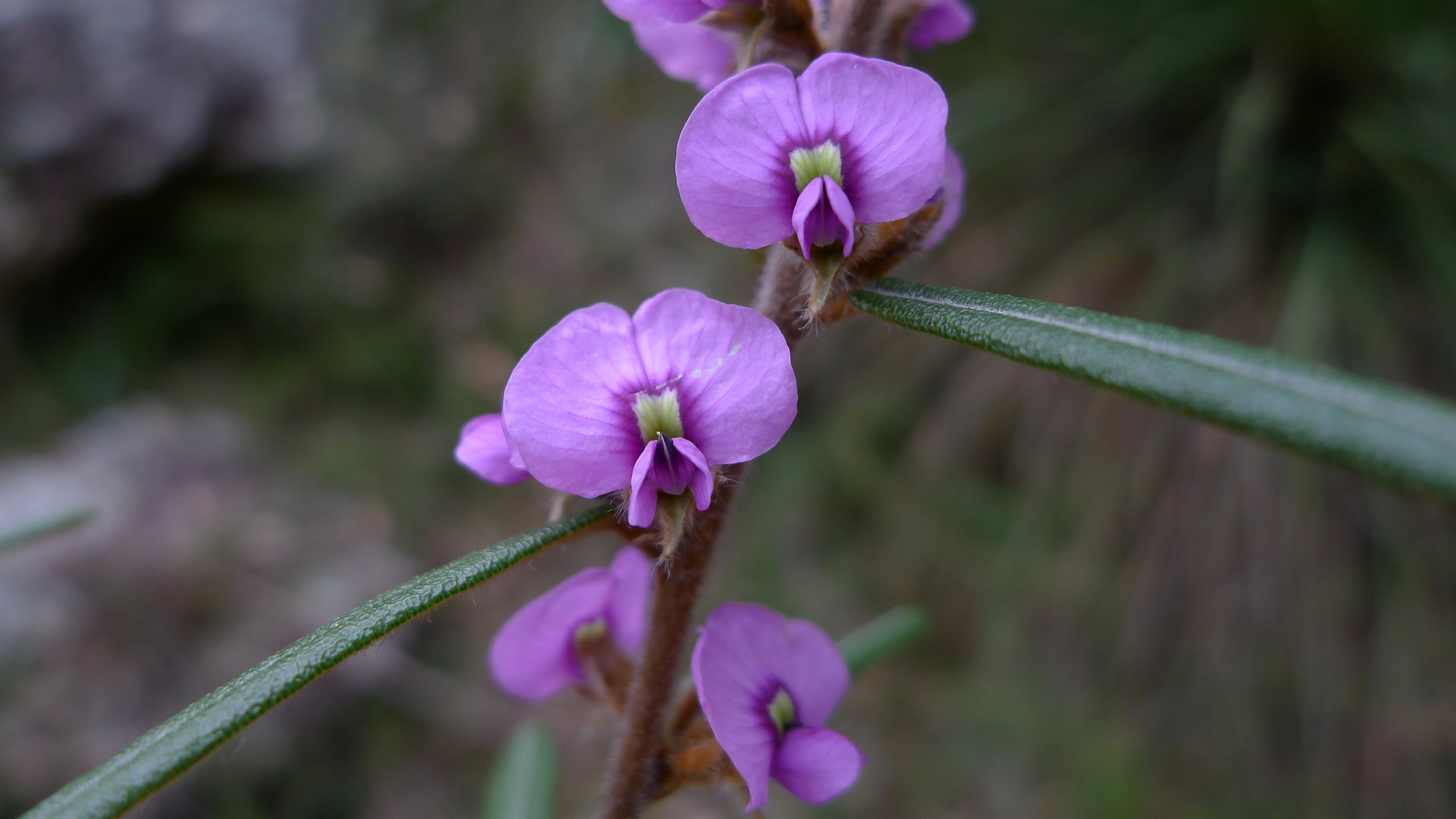

Scientific classification
- Kingdom: Plantae
- Clade: Tracheophytes
- Clade: Angiosperms
- Clade: Eudicots
- Clade: Rosids
- Order: Fabales
- Family: Fabaceae
- Subfamily: Faboideae
- Genus: Hovea
- Species: H. longifolia

Binomial name
- Hovea longifolia R.Br.

= Hovea longifolia =

Rusty pods

Species of shrub

Hovea longifolia, commonly known as rusty pods, is a flowering plant in the family Fabaceae, endemic to eastern Australia. It has purple pea flowers, linear leaves with rusty felt like hairs on the lower surface.

== Description ==
Hovea longifolia is a shrub to 3 m (9.8 ft) high and stems with brownish to grey, short, densely matted, curled or more or less straight hairs. The leaves strap like to linear, 2–8.5 cm (0.79–3.35 in) and 2–9 mm (0.079–0.354 in) wide, flat to slightly arched, blunt to sharp at the base, margins curved or rolled under, apex rounded or nearly pointed on a petiole 2.5–4 mm (0.098–0.157 in) long. The upper surface green, shiny, smooth, hairless except for a dense row of midrib hairs, and the lower surface densely covered in yellow-brown curled, felt like hairs. The inflorescence is a cluster of 1–3 flowers on pedicels 4–6 mm (0.16–0.24 in) long. The purple standard petal is twice the length of the calyx, with darker purple veins and a yellow centre, the wings and keel shorter. Flowering occurs from August to October and the fruit is an oval shaped pod 10–15 mm (0.39–0.59 in) long.

== Taxonomy and naming ==
Hovea longifolia was first formally described in 1812 by Robert Brown and the description was published in Hortus Kewensis. The specific epithet (longifolia) means "long leaved".

== Distribution and habitat ==
Rusty pods grows in shady, moist situations near stream banks and slopes, mostly from Narooma to Judge Dowling Range in New South Wales.
