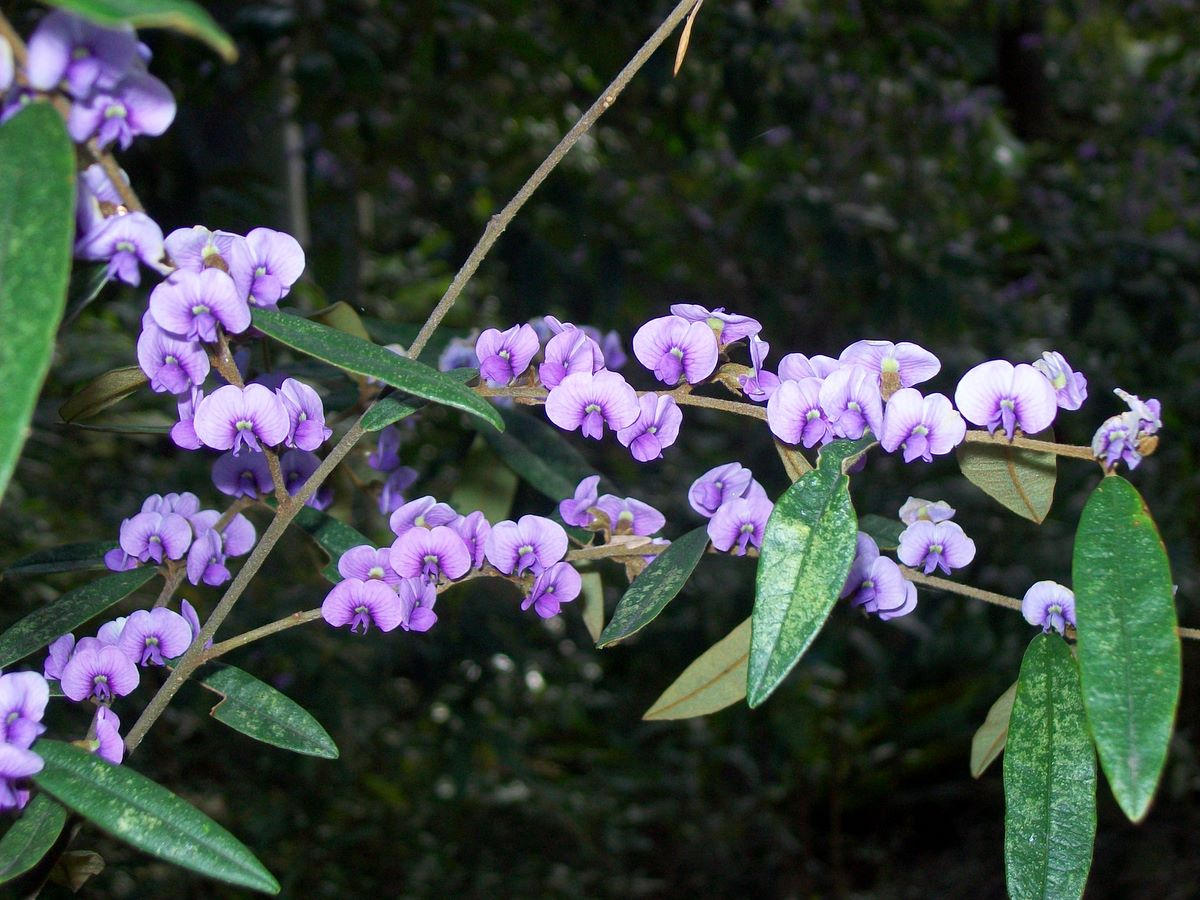

Scientific classification
- Kingdom: Plantae
- Clade: Tracheophytes
- Clade: Angiosperms
- Clade: Eudicots
- Clade: Rosids
- Order: Fabales
- Family: Fabaceae
- Subfamily: Faboideae
- Genus: Hovea
- Species: H. lanceolata

Binomial name
- Hovea lanceolata Sims

Synonyms
- Hovea lanceolata Sims var. lanceolata; Hovea sp. B (aff. lanceolata)

= Hovea lanceolata =

Species of legume

Hovea lanceolata is a flowering plant in the family Fabaceae. It is a small shrub with elliptic leaves and purple pea flowers. It grows in New South Wales and Queensland, Australia.

== Description ==
Hovea lanceolata is shrub to 3 m (9.8 ft) tall, most of the plant has curly, dense greyish brown hairs, occasionally spreading and straight. The leaves are mostly lanceolate in shape, though sometimes elliptic or narrow-oblong, flat margins, rounded at the base to almost pointed, 3.5–9 cm (1.4–3.5 in) long and 7–15 mm (0.28–0.59 in) wide, juvenile leaves longer and broader, apex variable, may be rounded, pointed or notched. The upper surface of the leaves is either green and shiny or greyish and dull, lower leaf surface with coiled grey-brown hairs. At the base of the leaf there are narrow-ovate to lance shaped stipules 1.0–3.2 mm (0.039–0.126 in) long, often tapering gradually to a point at the apex. The inflorescence usually consists of 1-3 blue-purple pea shaped flowers 10–12 mm (0.39–0.47 in) long on a short peduncle mostly 1.5 mm (0.059 in) long. The flowers with bracts are joined about 0.5 mm (0.020 in) from the base of the pedicel, narrowly oval shaped, 1.0–2.5 mm (0.039–0.098 in) long, and overlapping the smaller bracts or nearly so. The standard petal is 8–10 mm (0.31–0.39 in) long usually with yellow-greenish markings 2 mm (0.079 in) wide, the wings 7–7.5 mm (0.28–0.30 in) long and 3–4 mm (0.12–0.16 in) wide and the keel 5–6 mm (0.20–0.24 in) long and 2.4–3 mm (0.094–0.118 in) wide. Flowering occurs in September and October and the fruit is a round pod 10–15 mm (0.39–0.59 in) long and 10–15 mm (0.39–0.59 in) deep, shiny with occasional light coloured hairs.

== Taxonomy and naming ==
Hovea lanceolata was first formally described in 1814 by John Sims and the description was published in the Botanical Magazine. The specific epithet (lanceolata) is in reference to the leaves.

== Distribution and habitat ==
This hovea grows in loam, shaly and shallow soils in forests and woodland in Queensland and north-eastern New South Wales to Cowra.
