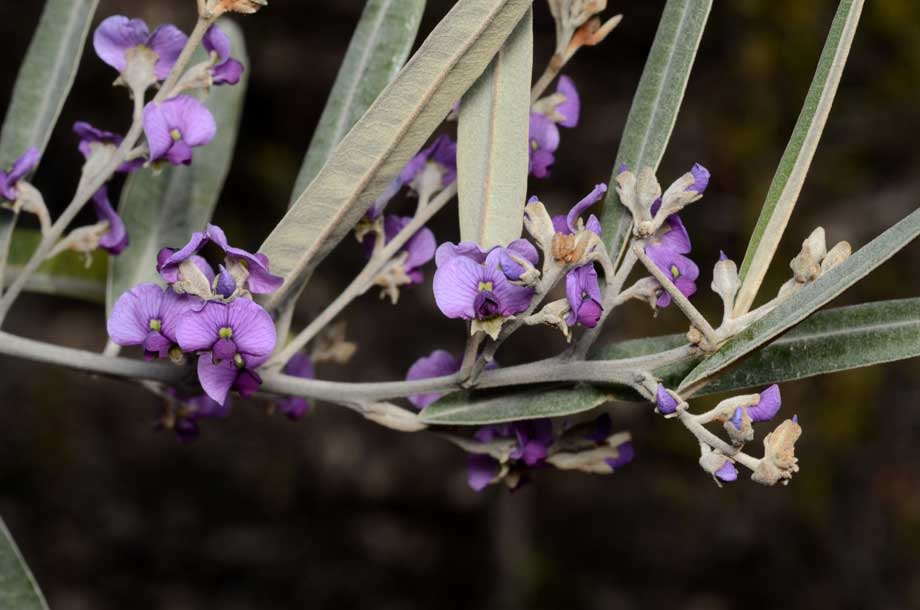
- Near Emmaville

Scientific classification
- Kingdom: Plantae
- Clade: Tracheophytes
- Clade: Angiosperms
- Clade: Eudicots
- Clade: Rosids
- Order: Fabales
- Family: Fabaceae
- Subfamily: Faboideae
- Genus: Hovea
- Species: H. apiculata

Binomial name
- Hovea apiculata A.Cunn. ex G.Don

= Hovea apiculata =

Species of legume

Hovea apiculata, is a species of flowering plant in the family Fabaceae and is endemic to eastern Australia. It is a shrub with white to greyish or light brown hairs, narrowly oblong leaves with stipules at the base, and purplish and deep mauve, pea-like flowers.

== Description ==
Hovea apiculata is a shrub that typically grows to a height of up to 3 m (9.8 ft), its foliage covered with white to grey, sometimes brown hairs. The leaves are narrowly oblong to lorate, 30–90 mm (1.2–3.5 in) long, 5–15 mm (0.20–0.59 in) wide on a petiole 4–9 mm (0.16–0.35 in) long with narrowly egg-shaped stipules 1.5–2.0 mm (0.059–0.079 in) long at the base. The flowers are usually arranged in racemes of four to twelve on a rachis up to 30 mm (1.2 in) long with bracts 0.8–2.8 mm (0.031–0.110 in) long at the base, and slightly shorter bracteoles. The sepals are 3.5–5.5 mm (0.14–0.22 in) long, joined at the base forming a tube 2–3 mm (0.079–0.118 in) long. The standard petal is pinkish-mauve and deep mauve with a greenish yellow centre and 7–11 mm (0.28–0.43 in) long, 8–15 mm (0.31–0.59 in) wide. The wings are 5–7 mm (0.20–0.28 in) long and the keel 4–5 mm (0.16–0.20 in) long. Flowering occurs from July to September and the fruit is a pod 10–15 mm (0.39–0.59 in) long.

== Taxonomy and naming ==
Hovea apiculata was first formally described in 1832 by George Don in his book, A General History of Dichlamydeous, from an unpublished description by Allan Cunningham. The specific epithet (apiculata) means "apiculate".

== Distribution and habitat ==
This species of pea grows in forest and woodland on sandy soils in south-eastern Queensland including in the Expedition National Park, and west of the Great Dividing Range in New South Wales as far south as Dubbo.
