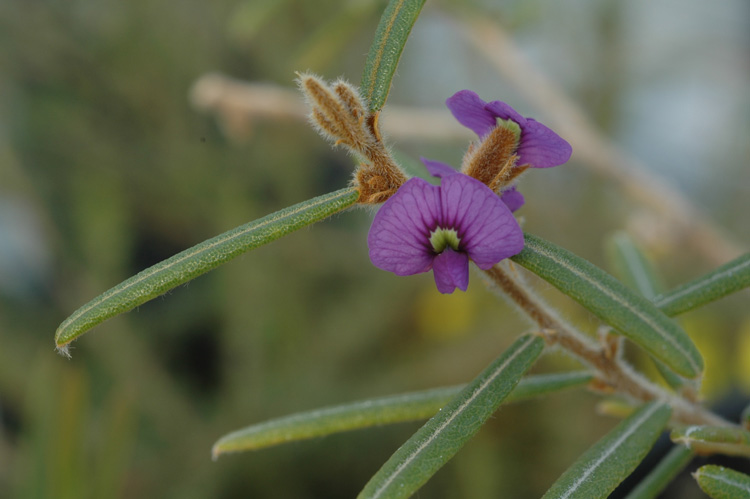

Scientific classification
- Kingdom: Plantae
- Clade: Tracheophytes
- Clade: Angiosperms
- Clade: Eudicots
- Clade: Rosids
- Order: Fabales
- Family: Fabaceae
- Subfamily: Faboideae
- Genus: Hovea
- Species: H. speciosa

Binomial name
- Hovea speciosa I.Thomps

= Hovea speciosa =

Species of flowering plant

Hovea speciosa is a flowering plant in the family Fabaceae, endemic to eastern Australia. It has purple pea flowers, linear leaves with long, rusty hairs on the lower surface. It is endemic to New South Wales.

== Description ==
Hovea speciosa is a shrub to 3 m (9.8 ft) high and stems with brownish to grey, short, densely matted, curled or more or less straight, flattened to nearly spreading hairs. The leaves are variable, they may be strap-like, narrow-elliptic or club-shaped, 2.5–6 cm (0.98–2.36 in) long and 3–7 mm (0.12–0.28 in) wide, midrib slightly recessed, the base rounded or almost pointed, margins rolled or curved under, apex almost pointed, notched or rounded. The upper surface a dull green, smooth except for a few hairs on the midrib, lower surface densely covered in cream, gold or brownish, short or spreading hairs. The inflorescence is a cluster of up to 3 flowers, sessile or nearly so, calyx 5–6 mm (0.20–0.24 in) long, bracteoles lance-shaped. The standard petal is 8–10 mm (0.31–0.39 in) long and 9–12 mm (0.35–0.47 in) wide with a white, centre flare.wings are 6.5–7 mm (0.26–0.28 in) long and 2.5–4 mm (0.098–0.157 in) wide, and the keel 5.5–5.7 mm (0.22–0.22 in) long and 2.2–2.5 mm (0.087–0.098 in) wide. Flowering occurs from August to September and the fruit is a broadly elliptic-shaped pod, 12–14 mm (0.47–0.55 in) long and 9–11 mm (0.35–0.43 in) deep, sessile, outer surface densely covered with long, gold-brownish, slightly flattened hairs.

== Taxonomy and naming ==
Hovea speciosa was first formally described in 2001 by I.R. Thompson and the description was published in Australian Systematic Botany. The specific epithet (speciosa) means "showy".

== Distribution and habitat ==
This hovea grows usually on sandstone in forests from Cowan, south to Nerriga, and the Blue Mountains.
