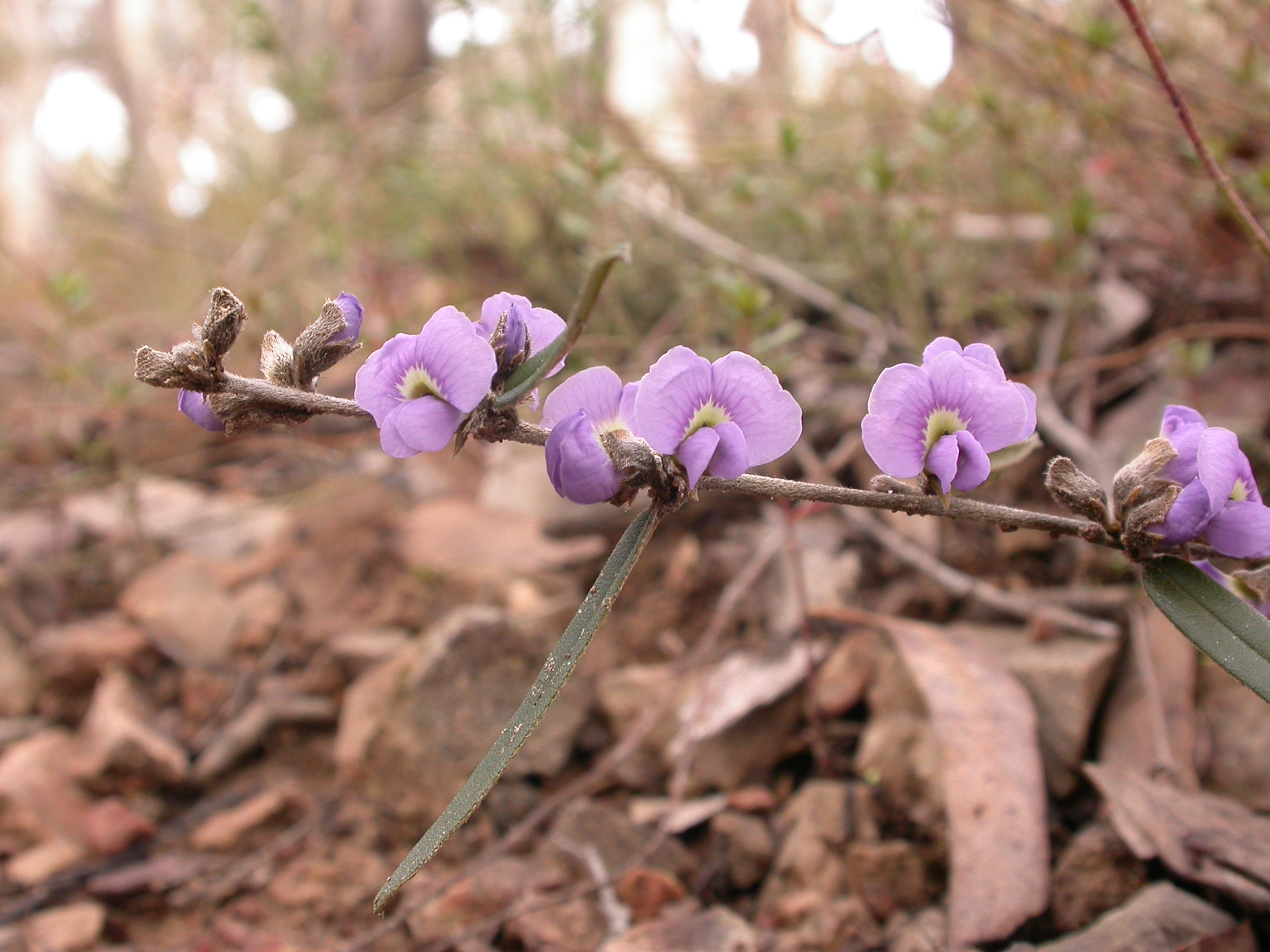

Scientific classification
- Kingdom: Plantae
- Clade: Embryophytes
- Clade: Tracheophytes
- Clade: Angiosperms
- Clade: Eudicots
- Clade: Rosids
- Order: Fabales
- Family: Fabaceae
- Subfamily: Faboideae
- Genus: Hovea
- Species: H. heterophylla

Binomial name
- Hovea heterophylla A.Cunn. ex Hook.f.

Synonyms
- List: Hovea heterophylla f. decipiens'' Domin p.p.; Hovea heterophylla A.Cunn. ex Hook.f. f. heterophylla; Hovea heterophylla f. typica Domin nom. inval.; Hovea linearis (Sm.) R.Br. p.p.; Hovea linearis auct. non (Sm.) R.Br.: Ross, J.H. in Walsh, N.G. & Entwisle, T.J. (ed.); Hovea linearis auct. non (Sm.) R.Br.: Buchanan, A.M. in Buchanan, A.M. (ed.) (1999)

= Hovea heterophylla =

Species of flowering plant

Hovea heterophylla, commonly known as creeping hovea, is a small shrub with linear leaves and purple-violet pea-like flowers. It is found in all Australian states other than Western Australia.

== Description ==
Hovea heterophylla is a small subshrub to 0.5 m (1 ft 8 in) high, stems upright or trailing, mostly emerging from a woody rootstock, and flattened, grey-brown straight hairs. The dark green leaves are variable in shape, lower leaves rounded to elliptic, upper leaves elliptic, linear or lance shaped, mostly −6.5 cm (−2.6 in) long and 1.5–17 mm (0.059–0.669 in) wide. The leaf margins rolled under to curved, hooked at the apex, upper surface hairless, smooth, net-like veins, under surface paler with flattened, dense hairs. The inflorescence has 1-3 pale mauve or purple flowers, standard petal striped with a yellow centre and the keel dark purple, calyx 3.5–5 mm (0.14–0.20 in) long, pedicel 1.5–3 mm (0.059–0.118 in) long. Flowering occurs from October to December and the fruit is a rounded, flattened pod, 9 mm (0.35 in) long with fine, flattened, rigid hairs.

== Taxonomy and naming ==
Hovea heterophylla was first formally described in 1855 by Joseph Dalton Hooker from an unpublished description by Allan Cunningham in The botany of the Antarctic voyage of H.M. Discovery ships Erebus and Terror. III. Flora Tasmaniae. The specific epithet (heterophylla) means "different leaved".

== Distribution and habitat ==
Creeping hovea is a common and widespread species growing in grassy woodland and montane forests on coasts and ranges in New South Wales. It occurs in all states other than Western Australia.
