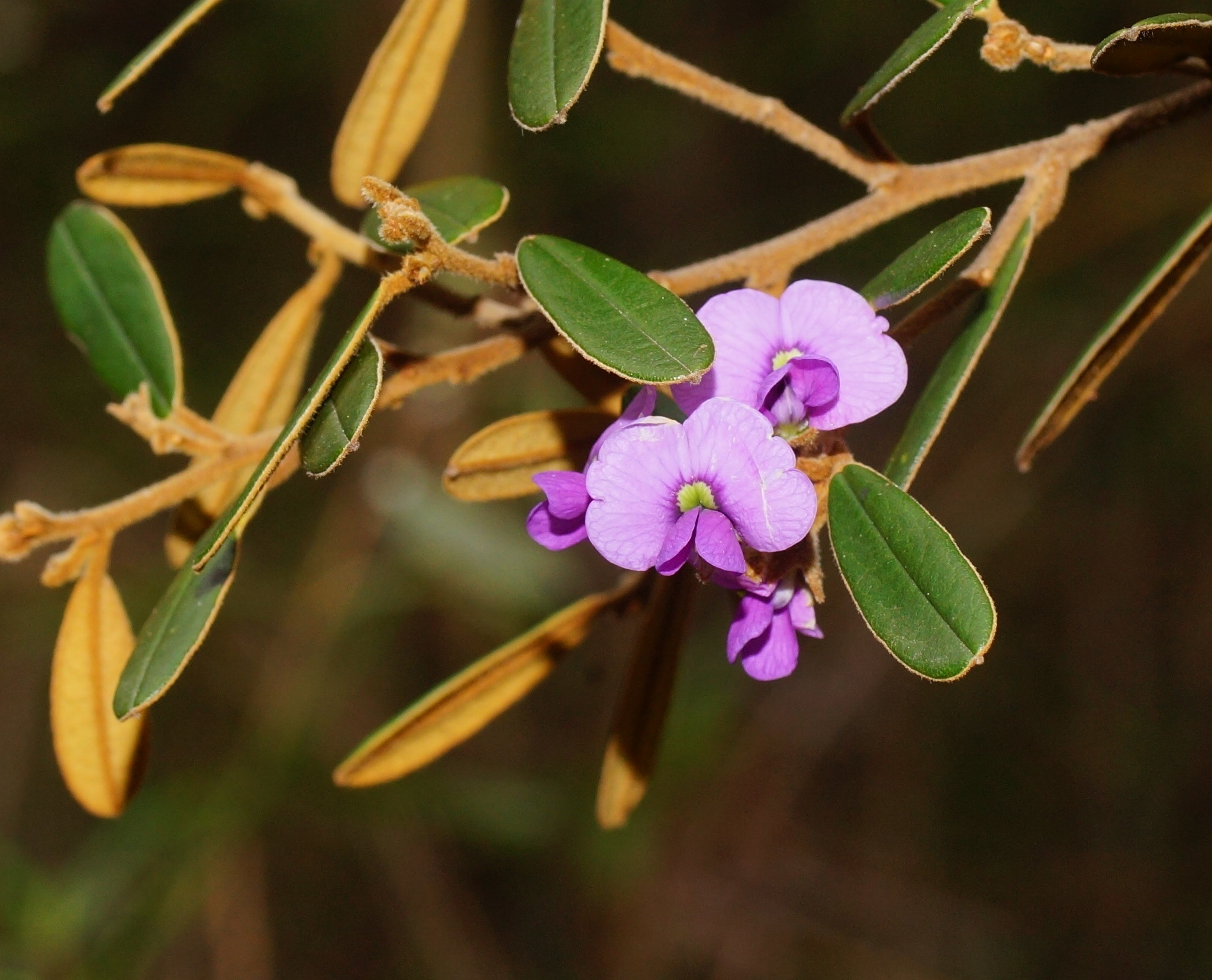
- In Willi Willi National Park

Scientific classification
- Kingdom: Plantae
- Clade: Tracheophytes
- Clade: Angiosperms
- Clade: Eudicots
- Clade: Rosids
- Order: Fabales
- Family: Fabaceae
- Subfamily: Faboideae
- Genus: Hovea
- Species: H. pedunculata

Binomial name
- Hovea pedunculata I.Thomps. & J.H.Ross

= Hovea pedunculata =

Species of legume

Hovea pedunculata, is a species of flowering plant in the family Fabaceae. It is a small shrub with mauve flowers, dark green leaves and rusty coloured new growth. It grows in Queensland and New South Wales.

== Description ==
Hovea pedunculata is a shrub that grows up to 2.5 m (8 ft 2 in) high with branchlets covered in brown-grey hairs. The leaves are narrowly elliptic or slightly oblong to lance-shaped, usually 2.5–5 cm (0.98–1.97 in) long, 6–12 mm (0.24–0.47 in) wide, flat, slightly curved either side of the midrib, margins usually curved under, upper surface smooth, distinctly veined. The lower surface thickly covered in curly to spreading hairs, stipules 4–6 mm (0.16–0.24 in) long, and the petiole 3–6 mm (0.12–0.24 in) long. The mauve-purple flowers are commonly borne in clusters of three, on a pedicel 2–4 mm (0.079–0.157 in) long, peduncle 5–20 mm (0.20–0.79 in) long, sometimes more or less sessile and the calyx 6–7.5 mm (0.24–0.30 in) long. Flowering occurs from August to September and the fruit is a pod somewhat densely covered with hairs.

== Taxonomy and naming ==
Hovea pedunculata was first formally described in 2001 by Ian R. Thompson and James Henderson Ross and the description was published in Australian Systematic Botany. The specific epithet (pedunculata) means "pedunculate".

== Distribution and habitat ==
This hovea grows in dry forests or woodland usually on granite in the Gibraltar Range, near Wauchope and in Queensland.
