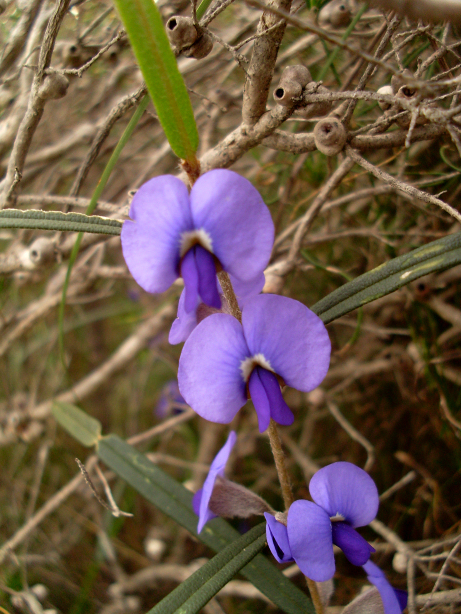

Scientific classification
- Kingdom: Plantae
- Clade: Tracheophytes
- Clade: Angiosperms
- Clade: Eudicots
- Clade: Rosids
- Order: Fabales
- Family: Fabaceae
- Subfamily: Faboideae
- Genus: Hovea
- Species: H. trisperma

Binomial name
- Hovea trisperma Benth.

= Hovea trisperma =

Common hovea

Species of legume

Hovea trisperma, commonly known as common hovea, is a flowering plant in the family Fabaceae. It is a small straggling shrub with purple-blue flowers and is endemic to Western Australia.

== Description ==
Hovea trisperma is a perennial, short stemmed, sprawling, woody shrub to 0.6 m (2 ft 0 in) high and multi-stemmed from the base. The branches thickly or sparsely coved with flattened hairs, often crinkled or twisted. The leaves are variable, they may be elliptic, lance-shaped, oval or linear-oblong and may vary on the one plant, upper leaves 0.8–13 cm (0.31–5.12 in) long and 0.3–6 cm (0.12–2.36 in) wide. The leaves rounded or pointed at the apex, margins may be slightly or distinctly curved under, upper surface smooth or with soft hairs and the petiole 1–3 mm (0.039–0.118 in) long. The inflorescences are borne in leaf axils in a cluster of 1-6 purplish-blue flowers, either sessile or on a short peduncle. Each flower is on a pedicel 1–7 mm (0.039–0.276 in) long that are densely covered with flattened, spreading hairs. The calyx thickly covered with flattened, erect to slightly spreading hairs.The standard petal is 10.8–20.2 mm (0.43–0.80 in) long and 10.5–25 mm (0.41–0.98 in) wide with a white, centre flare. The wings are 9–14.8 mm (0.35–0.58 in) long and 3.1–8 mm (0.12–0.31 in) wide, and the keel 6–11.6 mm (0.24–0.46 in) long and 2.3–4 mm (0.091–0.157 in) wide. Flowering occurs from May to November and the fruit is an oval-shaped pod.

== Taxonomy and naming ==
Hovea trisperma was first formally described in 1837 by George Bentham and the description was published in Enumeratio plantarum quas in Novae Hollandiae ora austro-occidentali ad fluvium Cygnorum et in Sinu Regis Georgii collegit Carolus liber baro de Hügel. The specific epithet (trisperma) means "three seed" referring to the fruit.

== Distribution and habitat ==
Common hovea grows in sandy and clay soils in heath, woodlands and mallee from Perth, south to Busselton, and to the south-west near Albany, and Esperance.
