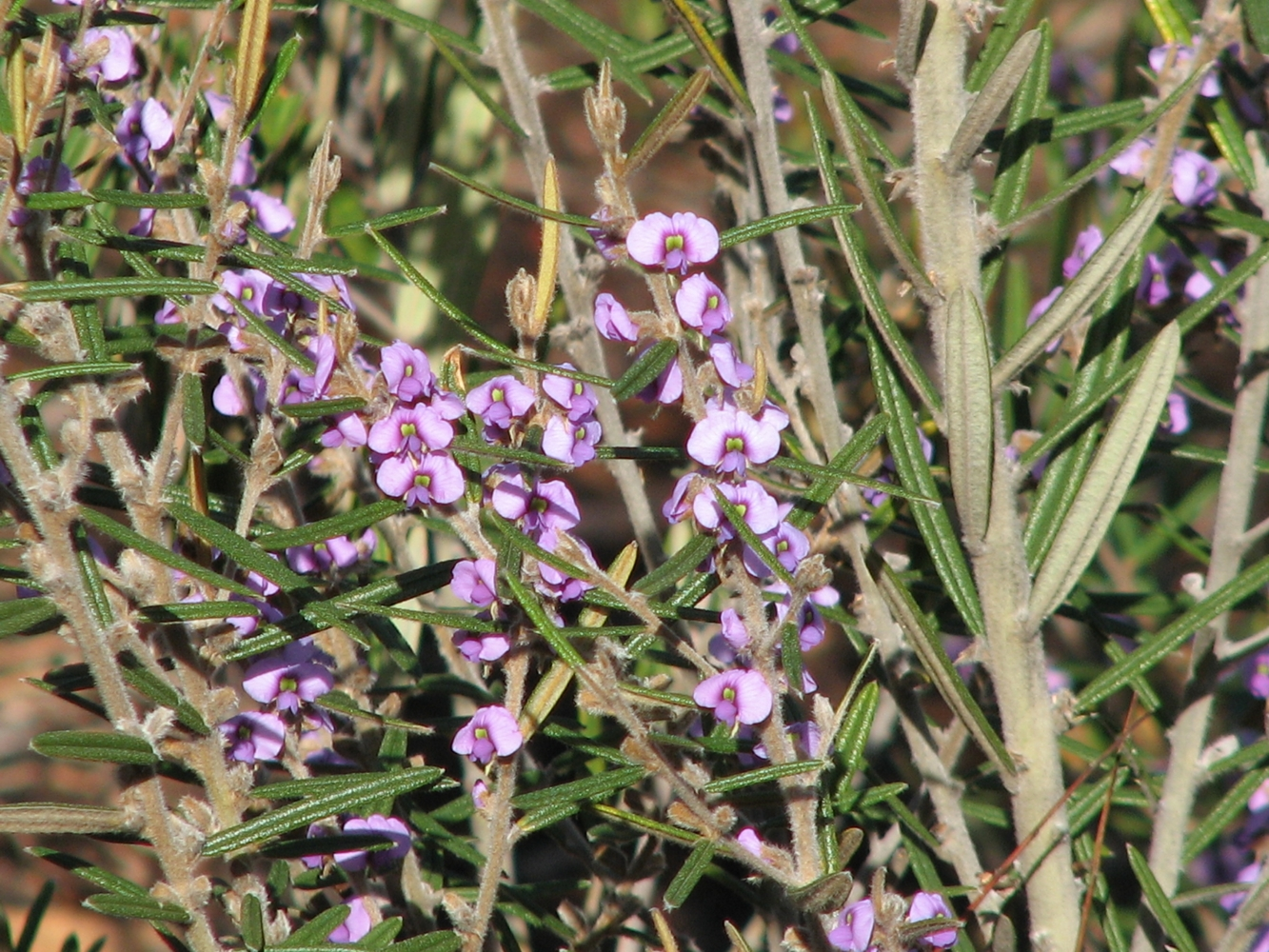

Scientific classification
- Kingdom: Plantae
- Clade: Tracheophytes
- Clade: Angiosperms
- Clade: Eudicots
- Clade: Rosids
- Order: Fabales
- Family: Fabaceae
- Subfamily: Faboideae
- Genus: Hovea
- Species: H. pannosa

Binomial name
- Hovea pannosa A.Cunn. ex Hook.f.

Synonyms
- Hovea longifolia subvar. pannosa (A.Cunn. ex Hook.) Domin; Hovea longifolia var. pannosa (A.Cunn. ex Hook.) Benth. p.p.; Hovea longifolia var. purpurea (Sweet) Domin p.p.; Hovea rosmarinifolia var. villosa J.H.Willis; Hovea villosa Lindl.; Hovea purpurea auct. non Sweet: Lee, A.T. & Thompson, J. (1984)

= Hovea pannosa =

Species of legume

Hovea pannosa is a species of flowering shrub in the family Fabaceae and is endemic to Australia. It is a small, erect shrub with purple pea flowers and stiff green leaves.

== Description ==
Hovea pannosa is a shrub that typically grows to a height of up to 3 m (9.8 ft) and has brown to dark grey hairs on the branchlets and sepals. The leaves are narrow-oval to narrowly elliptic-oblong shaped, stiff, mostly 2.5–5 cm (0.98–1.97 in) long and 4–7 mm (0.16–0.28 in) wide, margins rolled or curved under, upper surface smooth, underside with crumpled or curly rusty felt like hairs, and the petiole 2–4 mm (0.079–0.157 in) long. The purple flowers have darker purple markings and a pale yellowish centre, arranged in groups of 1-3 on a pedicel 2–3 mm (0.079–0.118 in) long that is densely covered with long, soft hairs. The standard petal is 8–10.5 mm (0.31–0.41 in) long, the keels shorter than the wings. Flowering occurs from August to September and the fruit is a sessile pod moderately covered with rusty coloured hairs.

== Taxonomy and naming ==
Hovea pannosa was first formally described in 1851 by Allan Cunningham and the description was published in Botanical Magazine. The specific epithet (pannosa) means "felt-like".

== Distribution ==
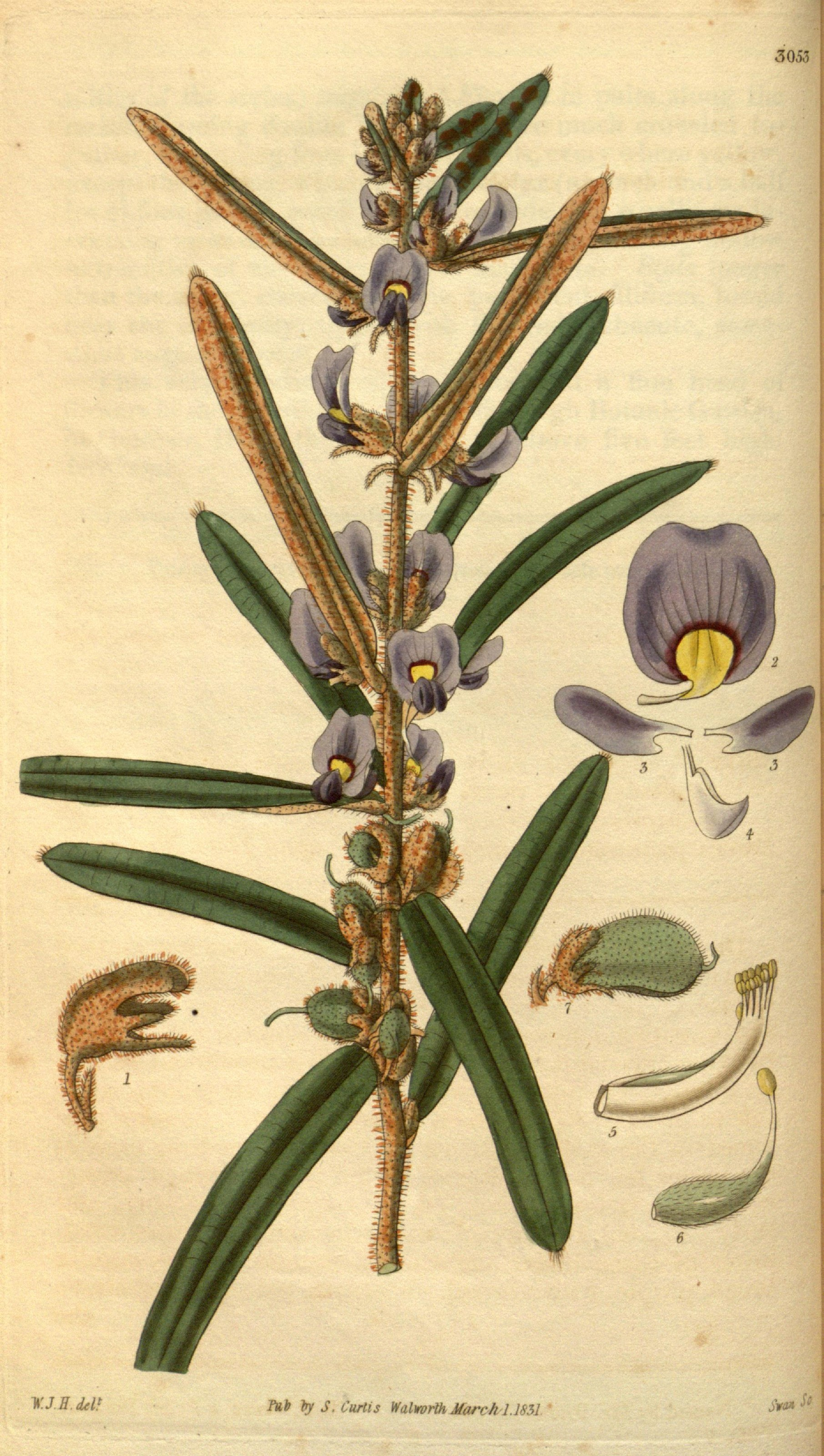
Illustration from 1831

This species grows in dry, rocky, sclerophyll forests south of the Blue Mountains in New South Wales and in the East Gippsland in Victoria.
