= B. concinna =

B. concinna may refer to:

- Baissea concinna, a plant used in traditional African medicine
- Banksia concinna, a Western Australian shrub
- Bilyaxia concinna, a jewel beetle
- Bossiaea concinna, an Australian plant
- Bulbine concinna, a succulent plant
- Buprestis concinna, a jewel beetle
- Bursa concinna, a sea snail
