= Bossiaea laxa =

Conservation status
- Priority Two — Poorly Known Taxa (DEC)

Scientific classification
- Kingdom: Plantae
- Clade: Tracheophytes
- Clade: Angiosperms
- Clade: Eudicots
- Clade: Rosids
- Order: Fabales
- Family: Fabaceae
- Subfamily: Faboideae
- Genus: Bossiaea
- Species: B. laxa

Binomial name
- Bossiaea laxa J.H.Ross

Species of legume

Bossiaea laxa is a species of flowering plant in the family Fabaceae and is endemic to a small area near Norseman in Western Australia. It is a spreading, openly-branched shrub with linear to narrow oblong leaves, and bright yellow and red flowers.

== Description ==
Bossiaea laxa is a spreading, openly-branched shrub that typically grows up to a height of up to 2 m (6 ft 7 in) and has branchlets that are flattened to oval in cross-section. The leaves are linear to narrow oblong, 10–32 mm (0.39–1.26 in) long and 0.7–2.5 mm (0.028–0.098 in) wide on a petiole 0.6–2.0 mm (0.024–0.079 in) long with triangular stipules 1.0–1.5 mm (0.039–0.059 in) long at the base. The flowers are arranged singly or in small groups, each flower on a thread-like pedicel 7–20 mm (0.28–0.79 in) long. There is only a single bracts up to 1 mm (0.039 in) long but that falls off at the bud stage. The five sepals are joined at the base forming a tube 4.6–5.5 mm (0.18–0.22 in) long with lobes 1–2 mm (0.039–0.079 in) long, with oblong bracteoles 1.5–2.4 mm (0.059–0.094 in) long on the pedicel. The standard petal is bright yellow with a faint red base and 12–16 mm (0.47–0.63 in) long, the wings 9.5–13.5 mm (0.37–0.53 in) long, and the keel is pale greenish-yellow and 10.1–14.5 mm (0.40–0.57 in) long. Flowering has been observed in May.

== Taxonomy and naming ==
Bossiaea laxa was first formally described in 2006 by James Henderson Ross in the journal Muelleria from specimens collected in the Cave Hill Reserve north-west of Norseman in 2003. The specific epithet (laxa) means "loose" or "open" referring to the species' growth form.

== Distribution and habitat ==
This bossiaea is only known from the Cave Hill Reserve in the Coolgardie biogeographic region where it grows in woodland.

== Conservation status ==
Bossiaea laxa is classified as "Priority Two" by the Western Australian Government Department of Parks and Wildlife, meaning that it is poorly known and from only one or a few locations.
