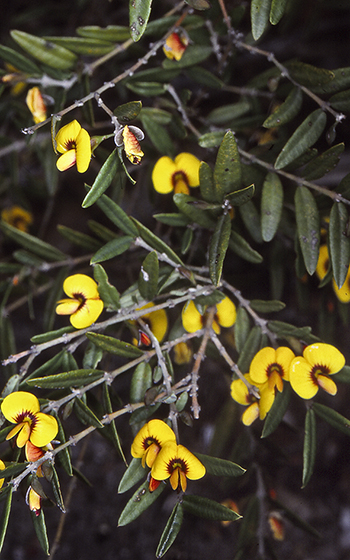

Scientific classification
- Kingdom: Plantae
- Clade: Tracheophytes
- Clade: Angiosperms
- Clade: Eudicots
- Clade: Rosids
- Order: Fabales
- Family: Fabaceae
- Subfamily: Faboideae
- Genus: Bossiaea
- Species: B. kiamensis

Binomial name
- Bossiaea kiamensis Benth.

= Bossiaea kiamensis =

Species of legume

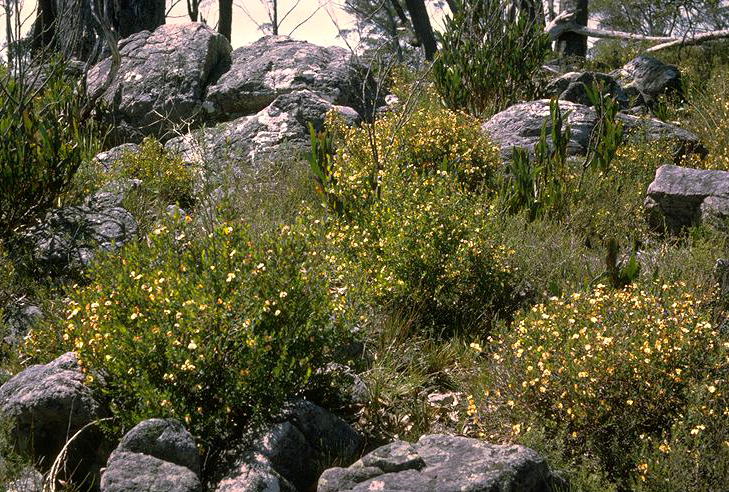
Habit in Budawang National Park

Bossiaea kiamensis is a species of flowering plant in the family Fabaceae and is endemic to the south coast of New South Wales. It is an erect or prostrate shrub with narrow elliptic or narrow oblong leaves and yellow and red to brown flowers.

== Description ==
Bossiaea kiamensis is an erect or prostrate shrub that typically grows to a height of up to 4 m (13 ft) and usually has its young stems covered with white hairs. The leaves are arranged in opposite pairs, narrow elliptic or narrow oblong, 10–35 mm (0.39–1.38 in) long and 2–7 mm (0.079–0.276 in) wide on a petiole 0.8–2 mm (0.031–0.079 in) long with stipules about 2 mm (0.079 in) long at the base. The leaves have a few hairs on the lower surface and the lower surface is paler than the upper surface. The flowers are 10–12 mm (0.39–0.47 in) long, each flower on a pedicel up to about 5 mm (0.20 in) long with several egg-shaped bracts up to 1.0 mm (0.039 in) long. The sepals are 5–6 mm (0.20–0.24 in) long joined at the base with bracteoles on the pedicel. The standard petal is yellow-orange with red markings, the wings purplish-brown with red streaks and the keel red is red to dark brown. Flowering mostly occurs from September to October and the fruit is an egg-shaped pod 10–20 mm (0.39–0.79 in) long.

== Taxonomy and naming ==
Bossiaea kiamensis was first formally described in 1864 by George Bentham in Flora Australiensis from specimens collected near Kiama.

== Distribution and habitat ==
This bossiaea grows on sandstone on the south coast of New South Wales from the Illawarra region to Milton.
