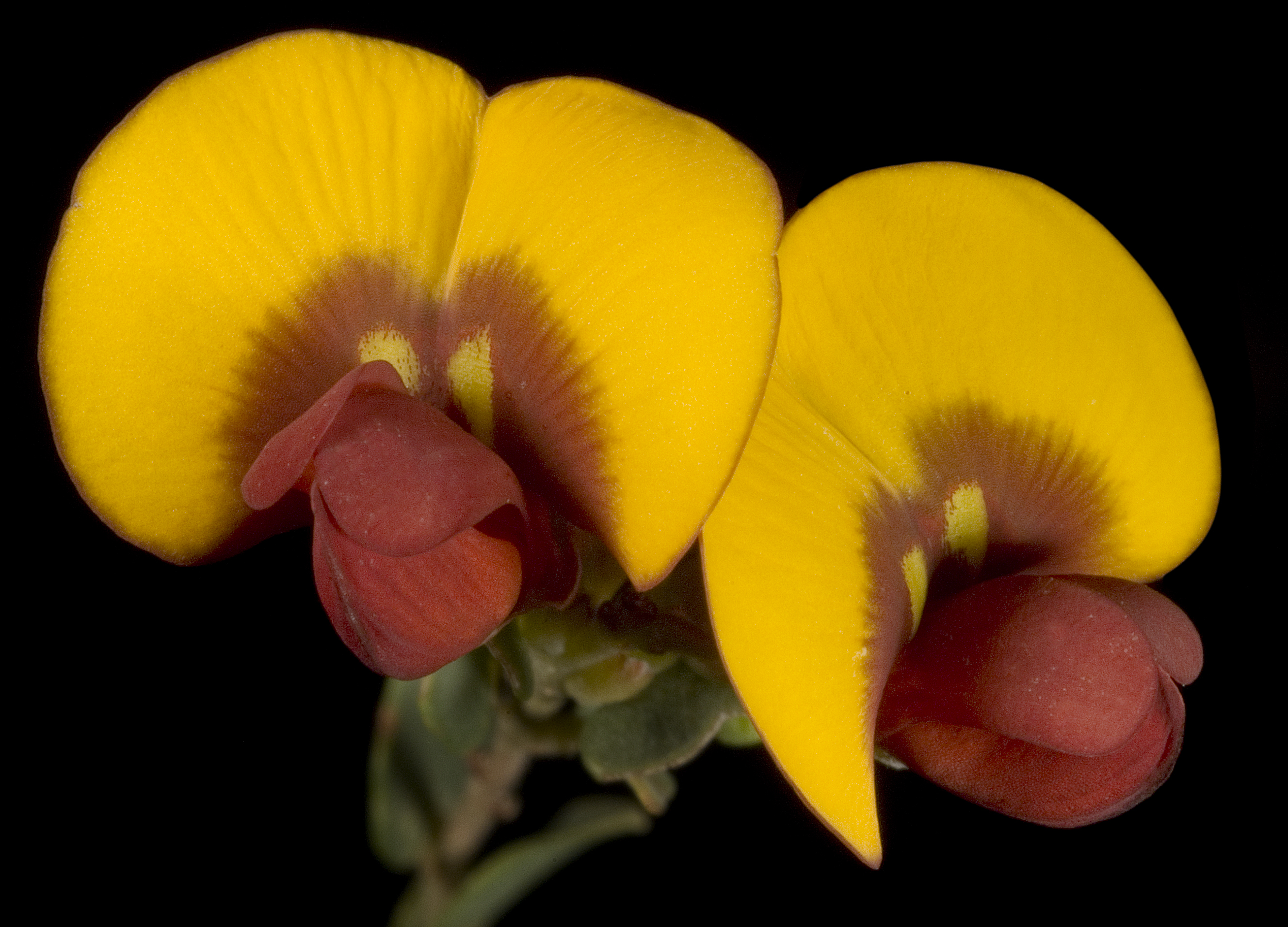

Scientific classification
- Kingdom: Plantae
- Clade: Tracheophytes
- Clade: Angiosperms
- Clade: Eudicots
- Clade: Rosids
- Order: Fabales
- Family: Fabaceae
- Subfamily: Faboideae
- Genus: Bossiaea
- Species: B. pulchella

Binomial name
- Bossiaea pulchella Meisn.

= Bossiaea pulchella =

Species of legume

Bossiaea pulchella is a species of flowering plant in the family Fabaceae and is endemic to the south-west of Western Australia. It is a slender, erect shrub with egg-shaped leaves, and orange-yellow, purplish brown and dark red flowers.

== Description ==
Bossiaea pulchella is a slender, erect shrub that typically grows to a height of up to 1.5 m (4 ft 11 in) with densely hairy branchlets. The leaves are egg-shaped with a heart-shaped base, 3–10 mm (0.12–0.39 in) long and 20–80 mm (0.79–3.15 in) wide on a petiole 0.3–1.5 mm (0.012–0.059 in) long with triangular stipules 0.3–0.6 mm (0.012–0.024 in) long at the base. The flowers are arranged singly on glabrous pedicels 2.0–2.7 mm (0.079–0.106 in) long, with bracts about 2 mm (0.079 in) long attached to the pedicels. There are oblong bracteoles 4.7–7.0 mm (0.19–0.28 in) long on the pedicels. The five sepals are joined at the base, forming a tube 3–4 mm (0.12–0.16 in) long, the lobes 1.0–1.5 mm (0.039–0.059 in) but the two upper lobes broader than the lower lobes. The standard petal is orange-yellow with a purplish-brown base and 10.8–14 mm (0.43–0.55 in) long, the wings 8.7–2.3 mm (0.343–0.091 in) long, and the keel is dark red and 8.0–9.7 mm (0.31–0.38 in) long. Flowering occurs from August to October and the fruit is a pod 10–14 mm (0.39–0.55 in) long.

== Taxonomy and naming ==
Bossiaea pulchella was first formally described in 1844 by Carl Meissner in Lehmann's Plantae Preissianae from specimens collected on the Darling Scarp in 1839. The specific epithet (pulchella) means "small and beautiful".

== Distribution and habitat ==
This bossiaea usually grows in lateritic soil in woodland in the Avon Wheatbelt, Jarrah Forest and Swan Coastal Plain biogeographic regions of south-western Western Australia.

== Conservation status ==
Bossiaea pulchella is classified as "not threatened" by the Western Australian Government Department of Parks and Wildlife.
