= Bossiaea alpina =

Scientific classification
- Kingdom: Plantae
- Clade: Tracheophytes
- Clade: Angiosperms
- Clade: Eudicots
- Clade: Rosids
- Order: Fabales
- Family: Fabaceae
- Subfamily: Faboideae
- Genus: Bossiaea
- Species: B. alpina

Binomial name
- Bossiaea alpina I.Thomps.

Species of flowering plant

Bossiaea alpina is a species of flowering plant in the family Fabaceae and is endemic to a small area in south-eastern Victoria, Australia. It is a diffuse shrub with oblong to elliptic leaves and bright yellow flowers arranged singly on the ends of branchlets.

== Description ==
Bossiaea alpina is a diffuse shrub that typically grows to a height of up to about 50 cm (20 in) and has hairy stems. The leaves are more or less glabrous, oblong to elliptic, folded lengthwise, 1–2 mm (0.039–0.079 in) long and 1–2.5 mm (0.039–0.098 in) wide with triangular stipules 0.7–1.5 mm (0.028–0.059 in) long at the base. The flowers are arranged singly on the ends of branchlets, and are 5–7 mm (0.20–0.28 in) long on a peduncle 1.5–2.5 mm (0.059–0.098 in) long with crowded bracts 2–3 mm (0.079–0.118 in) long. The sepals are about 3.0–3.5 mm (0.12–0.14 in) long with oblong to egg-shaped bracteoles 2–3.5 mm (0.079–0.138 in) long at the base of the sepal tube. The petals are bright yellow, more or less equal in length and the ovary is densely hairy, more or less spherical and about 6 mm (0.24 in) in diameter. Flowering occurs from December to January.

== Taxonomy and naming ==
Bossiaea alpina was first formally described in 2012 by Ian R. Thompson in the journal Muelleria from specimens collected by David Albert Albrecht near Surveyors Creek Camp in 1992. The specific epithet (alpina) refers to the species' alpine and subalpine habitats.

== Distribution and habitat ==
This bossiaea grows in alpine and subalpine heath and woodland in the southern alps of Victoria, including on Lake Mountain, Mount Buller and in the Howill Plains area.
