= Bossiaea armitii =

Scientific classification
- Kingdom: Plantae
- Clade: Tracheophytes
- Clade: Angiosperms
- Clade: Eudicots
- Clade: Rosids
- Order: Fabales
- Family: Fabaceae
- Subfamily: Faboideae
- Genus: Bossiaea
- Species: B. armitii

Binomial name
- Bossiaea armitii F.Muell.
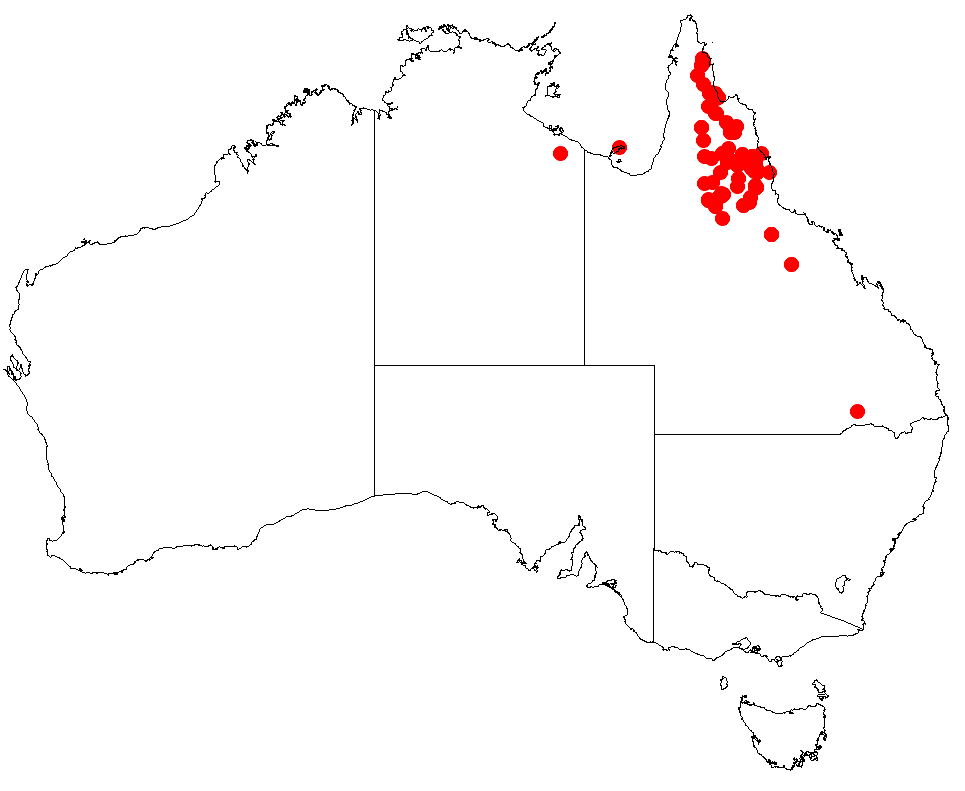
- Occurrence data from the AVH

Species of legume

Bossiaea armitii is an erect, rhizomatous, leafless shrub in the pea family (Fabaceae), and is native to Queensland.

== Description ==
Bossiaea armitii grows to about 3 m, with cladodes up to about 40 mm wide. The inflorescence bearing cladodes are smooth except for hairs on the margin immediately above the axil. Cladodes are green/greyish at flowering. In profile new growth is elliptic. The ovate bracteoles are persistent. It flowers from summer to autumn and the yellow flowers are about 20 mm long. The pods are smooth with minute ridging along the suture.

== Distribution ==
It occurs in far north Queensland to as far south as Charters Towers, and grows in woodland and shrubland, often along rivers and among rocks.

== Taxonomy ==
The species was first described as Bossiaea armitii in 1875 by von Mueller. The accepted description is now that of Holland & Pedley (2010). There are no synonyms. The lectotype is MEL 651099 and isolectotypes are: MEL 651100, MEL 651101.
