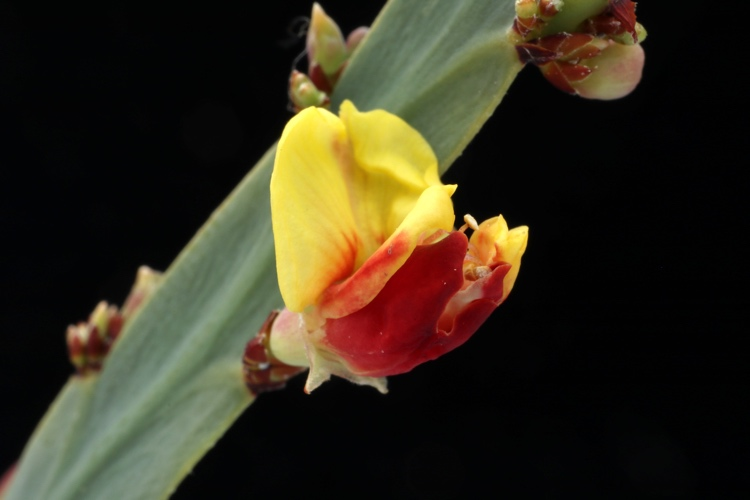
- In the Australian National Botanic Gardens

Conservation status
- Critically endangered (EPBC Act)

Scientific classification
- Kingdom: Plantae
- Clade: Tracheophytes
- Clade: Angiosperms
- Clade: Eudicots
- Clade: Rosids
- Order: Fabales
- Family: Fabaceae
- Subfamily: Faboideae
- Genus: Bossiaea
- Species: B. fragrans

Binomial name
- Bossiaea fragrans K.L.McDougall

= Bossiaea fragrans =

Species of flowering plant

Bossiaea fragrans is a species of flowering plant in the family Fabaceae and is endemic to a small area of New South Wales. It is an erect shrub with flattened cladodes, small, scale-like leaves, and pea-like, yellow and red flowers.

== Description ==
Bossiaea fragrans is an erect shrub that typically grows to a height of 1.0–2.5 m (3 ft 3 in – 8 ft 2 in) with flattened, winged cladodes 8–14 mm (0.31–0.55 in) wide. The leaves are reduced to dark brown scales, 1.5–1.9 mm (0.059–0.075 in) long. The flowers are borne singly or in groups of up to six, each flower on a pedicel 2.5–3 mm (0.098–0.118 in) long with overlapping, narrow egg-shaped bracts up to 1.5 mm (0.059 in) long at the base. The five sepals are 4.5–5.0 mm (0.18–0.20 in) long and joined at the base forming a tube, the two upper lobes about 1.5 mm (0.059 in) wide and the lower three lobes about 1.0 mm (0.039 in) wide. There are also bracteoles but that fall off before the flower opens. The standard petal is yellow with a red base and 10.5–12.0 mm (0.41–0.47 in) long, the wings yellow with a red base and about 10–11 mm (0.39–0.43 in) long and the keel is dark red and 10–11 mm (0.39–0.43 in) wide. Flowering occurs in September and October and the fruit is an oblong pod 24–38 mm (0.94–1.50 in) long.

== Taxonomy and naming ==
Bossiaea fragrans was first formally described in 2009 by Keith Leonard McDougall in the journal Telopea from specimens he collected in the Abercrombie Karst Conservation Area.

== Distribution and habitat ==
This bossiaea is only known from two populations near Abercrombie Caves on the southern tablelands of New South Wales where it grows in woodland.

== Conservation status ==
Bossiaea fragrans is listed as "critically endangered" under the Australian Government Environment Protection and Biodiversity Conservation Act 1999 and the New South Wales Government Biodiversity Conservation Act 2016.
