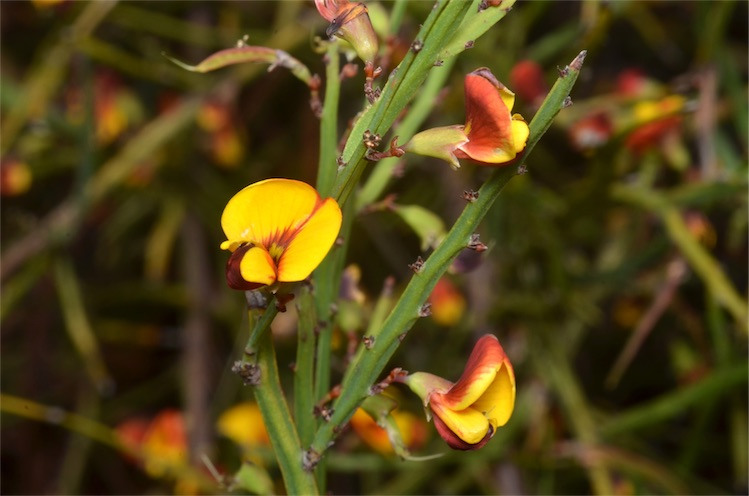
- In the Royal Tasmanian Botanical Gardens

Scientific classification
- Kingdom: Plantae
- Clade: Tracheophytes
- Clade: Angiosperms
- Clade: Eudicots
- Clade: Rosids
- Order: Fabales
- Family: Fabaceae
- Subfamily: Faboideae
- Genus: Bossiaea
- Species: B. riparia

Binomial name
- Bossiaea riparia A.Cunn. ex Benth.
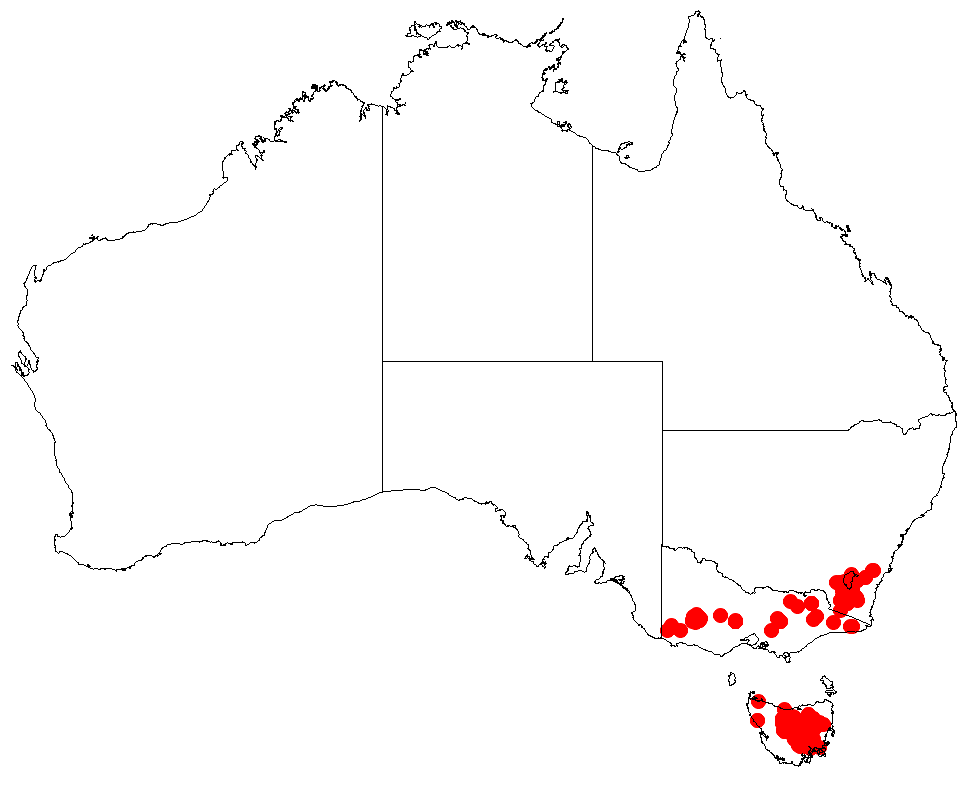
- Occurrence data from AVH

= Bossiaea riparia =

River leafless bossiaea

Species of legume

Bossiaea riparia, commonly known as river leafless bossiaea, is a species of flowering plant in the family Fabaceae and is endemic to south-eastern Australia. It is an erect or low-lying shrub with flattened branches, linear young cladodes, leaves mostly reduced to small scales, and yellow and red flowers.

== Description ==
Bossiaea riparia is an erect or low-lying shrub that typically grows to a height of up to 1 m (3 ft 3 in), and has flattened winged stems, the cladodes 2–4 mm (0.079–0.157 in) wide. The leaves are reduced to small scales about 1 mm (0.039 in) long. The flowers are arranged singly or in small groups in recesses on the side of the cladodes, each flower 6–10 mm (0.24–0.39 in) long on pedicels 2–4 mm (0.079–0.157 in) long with five or six bracts up to 1 mm (0.039 in) long at the base and bracteoles about 1.5 mm (0.059 in) long near the middle of the pedicel. The five sepals are 3–4 mm (0.12–0.16 in) long and joined at the base forming a tube, the upper lobes 0.8–1.3 mm (0.031–0.051 in) long and 1.0–1.5 mm (0.039–0.059 in) wide, the lower lobes shorter and narrower. The standard petal is yellow with a red base and about 12 mm (0.47 in) long, the wings are yellow or brownish-red and 2.0–2.5 mm (0.079–0.098 in) wide, and the keel is red and about 3 mm (0.12 in) wide. Flowering occurs from August to December and the fruit is a narrow oblong or elliptic pod 12–24 mm (0.47–0.94 in) long.

== Taxonomy ==
Bossiaea riparia was first formally described in 1864 by George Bentham in Flora Australiensis from an unpublished description by Allan Cunningham. The specific epithet (riparia) means "frequenting the banks of rivers or streams".

== Distribution and habitat ==
River leafless bossiaea grows in woodland and forest south from the Australian Capital Territory and the Southern Tablelands of New South Wales to scattered locations in Victoria and Tasmania.
