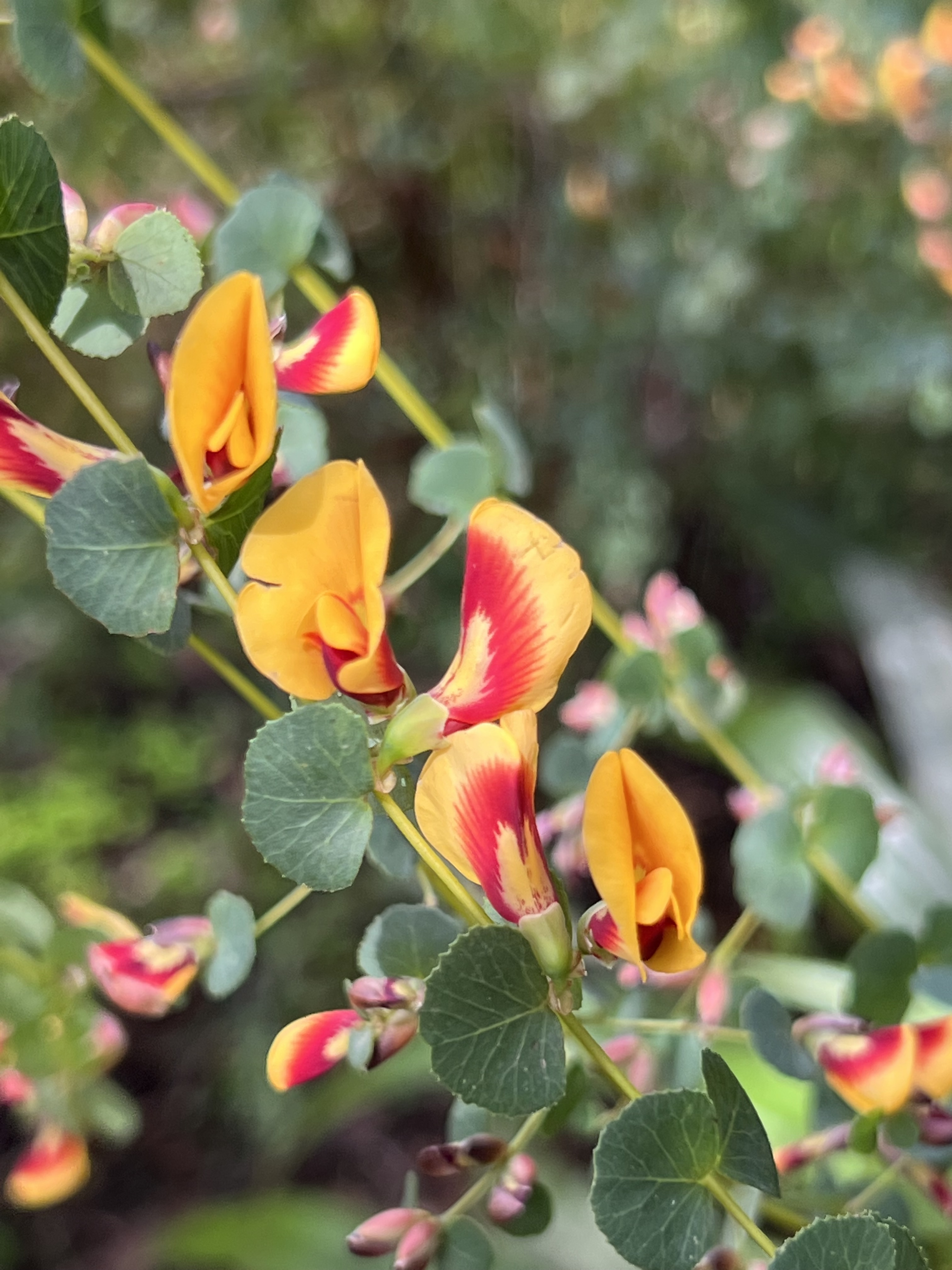

Scientific classification
- Kingdom: Plantae
- Clade: Tracheophytes
- Clade: Angiosperms
- Clade: Eudicots
- Clade: Rosids
- Order: Fabales
- Family: Fabaceae
- Subfamily: Faboideae
- Genus: Bossiaea
- Species: B. webbii

Binomial name
- Bossiaea webbii F.Muell.

= Bossiaea webbii =

Water bush

Species of legume

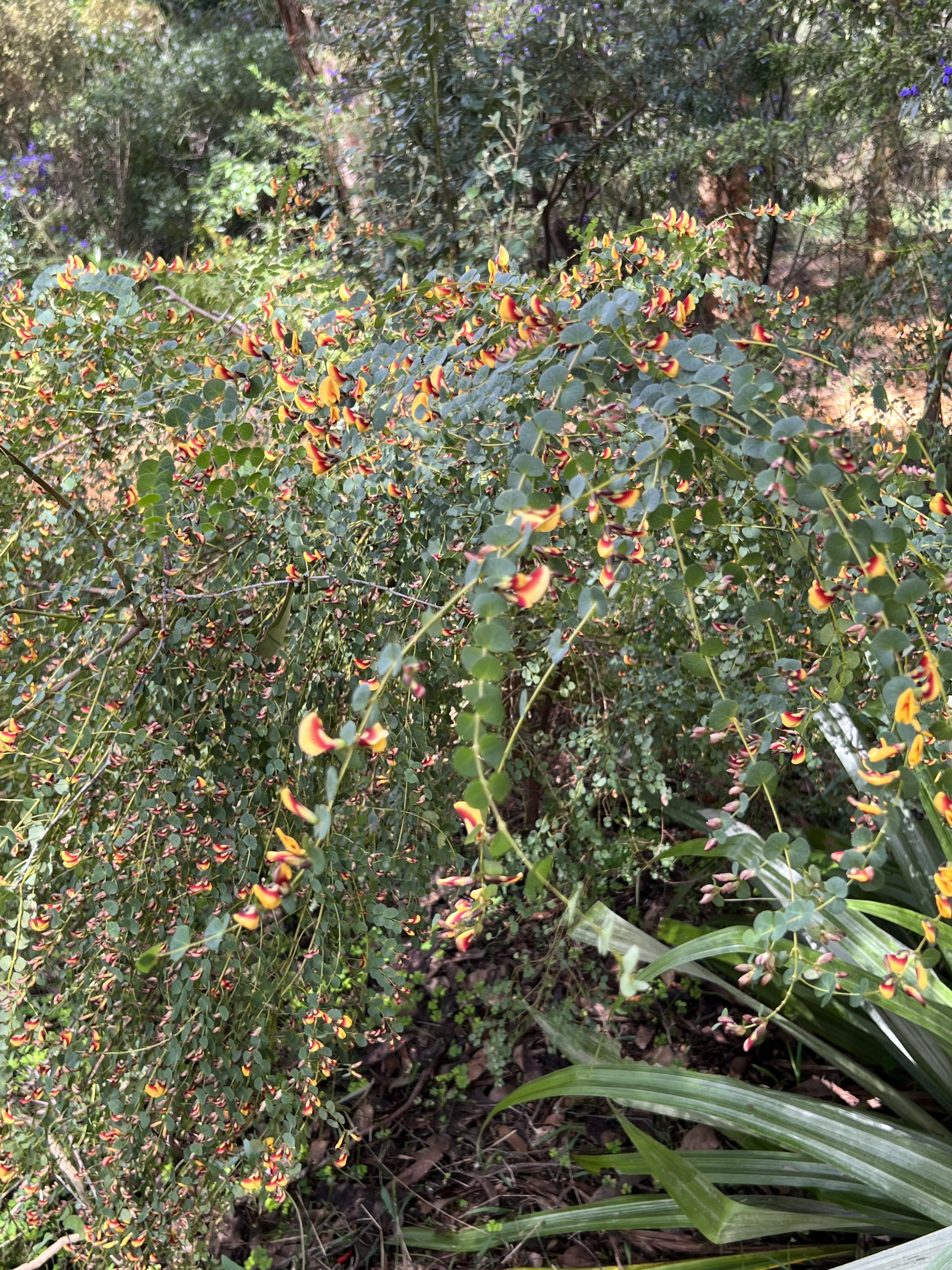
Habit

Bossiaea webbii, commonly known as water bush, is a species of flowering plant in the family Fabaceae and is endemic to the south-west of Western Australia. It is an erect, slender shrub with more or less round to kidney-shaped, minutely-toothed leaves and orange-yellow and red, pea-like flowers.

== Description ==
Bossiaea webbii is an erect, slender shrub that typically grows up to 2.6 m (8 ft 6 in) high, sometimes with arching branches. The leaves are more or less round to kidney-shaped with fine teeth on the edges, 3–18 mm (0.12–0.71 in) long and 5–24 mm (0.20–0.94 in) wide on a petiole 0.7–1.3 mm (0.028–0.051 in) long with triangular stipules 0.5–0.7 mm (0.020–0.028 in) long at the base. The flowers are arranged singly or in pairs, each flower on a pedicel 4.0–4.5 mm (0.16–0.18 in) long, with broadly egg-shaped bracts attached to the pedicel. The five sepals are joined at the base, forming a tube 2.7–4.0 mm (0.11–0.16 in) long, the two upper lobes 1.0–1.9 mm (0.039–0.075 in) long and the lower lobes 0.7–1.2 mm (0.028–0.047 in) long. The standard petal is orange-yellow with a red markings and 12.5–14.5 mm (0.49–0.57 in) long, the wings are pinkish-red and yellow and 9.5–14.2 mm (0.37–0.56 in) long, and the keel greenish-white and pinkish-red and 9.5–12.5 mm (0.37–0.49 in) long. Flowering occurs from July to November and the fruit is a flattened pod 11–21 mm (0.43–0.83 in) long.

== Taxonomy and naming ==
Bossiaea webbii was first formally described in 1882 by Ferdinand von Mueller in The Chemist and Druggist with Australasian Supplement from specimens collected "on the summit of Mount Lindsay, near King George's Sound". The specific epithet (webbii) honours William Webb, who collected the type specimens.

== Distribution and habitat ==
Water bush grows in jarrah, karri and marri forest and in low, heathy woodland in the Jarrah Forest and Warren biogeographic regions of south-western Western Australia.

== Conservation status ==
Bossiaea webbii is classified as "not threatened" by the Western Australian Government Department of Biodiversity, Conservation and Attractions.
