= Bossiaea arenicola =

Scientific classification
- Kingdom: Plantae
- Clade: Tracheophytes
- Clade: Angiosperms
- Clade: Eudicots
- Clade: Rosids
- Order: Fabales
- Family: Fabaceae
- Subfamily: Faboideae
- Genus: Bossiaea
- Species: B. arenicola

Binomial name
- Bossiaea arenicola J.H.Ross
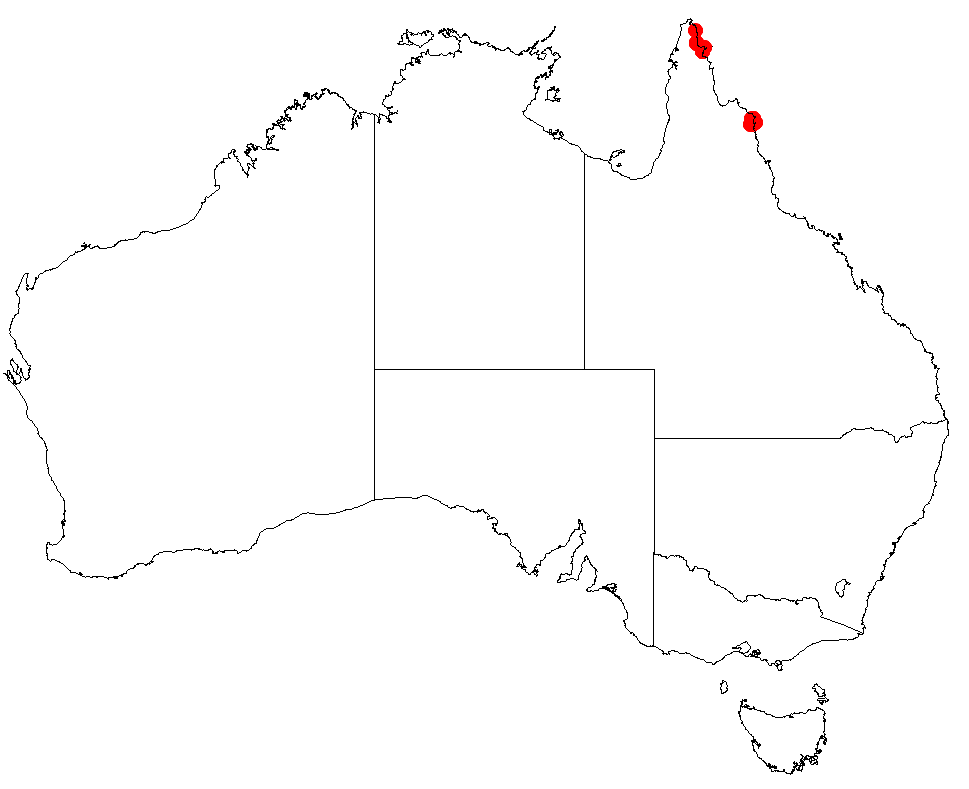
- Occurrence data from the AVH

Synonyms
- Bossiaea sp. 'McIvor River' (J.R.Clarkson 5322)

Species of legume

Bossiaea arenicola is a species of flowering plant in the family Fabaceae and is endemic to a far north Queensland. It is a shrub or small tree with broadly elliptic to more or less round leaves, and yellow and pale greenish flowers.

== Description ==
Bossiaea arenicola is a shrub or tree that typically grows to a height of up to about 8 m (26 ft). The leaves are elliptic to more or less round, 8–15 mm (0.31–0.59 in) long and 17–15 mm (0.67–0.59 in) wide on a petiole 1–2 mm (0.039–0.079 in) long with brown stipules about 1 mm (0.039 in) long at the base. The flowers are borne on short side shoots on a pedicel 1–5 mm (0.039–0.197 in) long with a single bract 1–1.5 mm (0.039–0.059 in) long. The sepals are 4–5 mm (0.16–0.20 in) and joined at the base forming a tube with the two upper lobes triangular 1.5–2.0 mm (0.059–0.079 in) long and the lower three lobes 1.3–2 mm (0.051–0.079 in) long. The standard petal is yellow, up to 13 mm (0.51 in) long, the wings 1–2 mm (0.039–0.079 in) long and the keel pale greenish yellow and about the same length as the standard. Flowering occurs from April to June and the fruit is an oblong to elliptic pod about 20 mm (0.79 in) long.

== Taxonomy ==
Bossiaea arenicola was first formally described in 1991 by James Henderson Ross in the journal Muelleria from specimens collected on the track to the McIvor River on Cape York Peninsula. The specific epithet (arenicola) means "sand inhabitant".

== Distribution and habitat ==
This bossiaea grows on sand dunes in heath and shrubland from the tip of Cape York Peninsula to near Cooktown.
