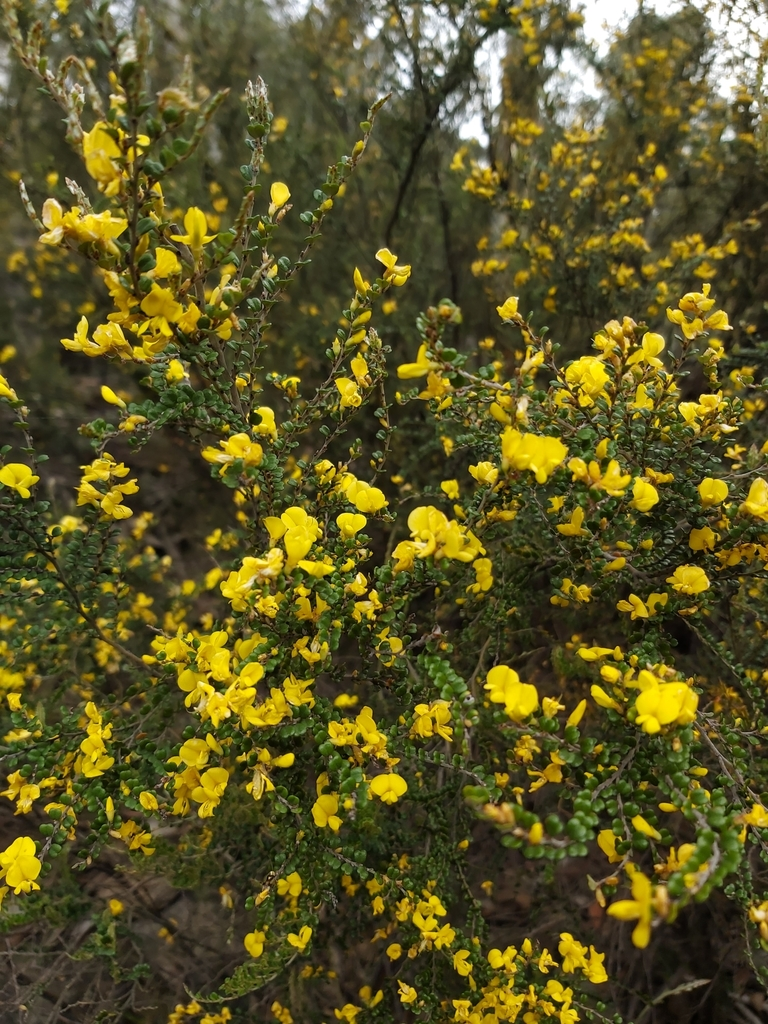

Scientific classification
- Kingdom: Plantae
- Clade: Tracheophytes
- Clade: Angiosperms
- Clade: Eudicots
- Clade: Rosids
- Order: Fabales
- Family: Fabaceae
- Subfamily: Faboideae
- Genus: Bossiaea
- Species: B. sericea

Binomial name
- Bossiaea sericea I.Thomps.
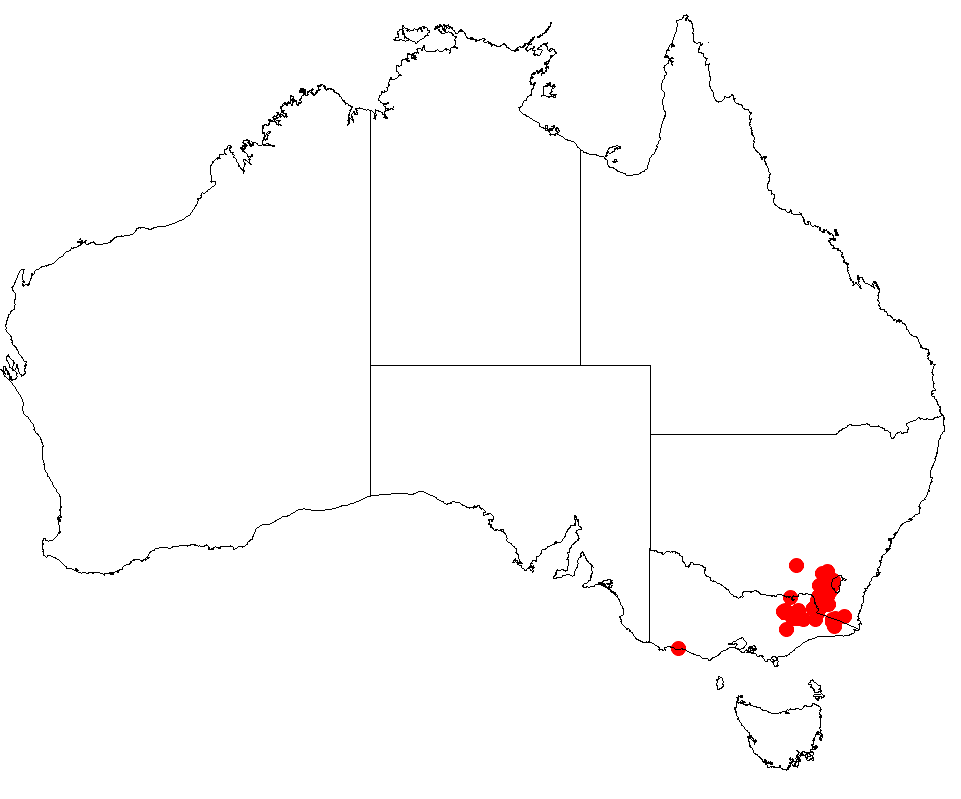
- Occurrence data from the AVH

= Bossiaea sericea =

Species of legume

Bossiaea sericea is a species of flowering plant in the family Fabaceae and is endemic to higher areas of south-eastern continental Australia. It is an erect shrub with more or less round to heart-shaped leaves with the narrower end towards the base, and yellow flowers.

== Description ==
Bossiaea sericea is an erect shrub that typically grows to a height of up to 2 m (6 ft 7 in) and has stems that are round in cross-section. The leaves are more or less round to hear-shaped or egg-shaped with the narrower end towards the base, mostly 2–4 mm (0.079–0.157 in) long and 1.5–5 mm (0.059–0.197 in) wide with triangular stipules 0.7–2 mm (0.028–0.079 in) long and longer than the petiole. The upper surface of the leaves is more or less glabrous but the lower surface is covered with fine white hairs. The flowers are 5–7 mm (0.20–0.28 in) long and arranged singly on a pedicel 1–3.5 mm (0.039–0.138 in) long with crowded broadly egg-shaped bracts up to 0.7–2.2 mm (0.028–0.087 in) long at the base and narrow egg-shaped or oblong bracteoles 0.7–2.5 mm (0.028–0.098 in) long near the base of the sepals. The five sepals are 2.0–3.5 mm (0.079–0.138 in) long and joined at the base forming a tube, the upper lobes 0.9–1.5 mm (0.035–0.059 in) long and about 0.8 mm (0.031 in) wide, the lower lobes shorter and narrower. The petals are yellow, sometimes tinged with pink on the edges, the standard petal up to about 8 mm (0.31 in) long, the wings 1.5–2.0 mm (0.059–0.079 in) wide, and the keel 2.0–2.5 mm (0.079–0.098 in) wide. Flowering occurs from December to January and the fruit is a broadly elliptic pod 6–10 mm (0.24–0.39 in) long and covered rusty hairs or a mixture of pale and rusty hairs.

== Taxonomy ==
Bossiaea sericea was first formally described in 2012 by Ian R. Thompson in the journal Muelleria from specimens collected by Robert Owen Makinson on 3 December 1991 near Omeo. The specific epithet (sericea) is derived from the Latin, sericeus (silky) and refers to the silky undersurface of the leaves.

== Distribution and habitat ==
This bossiaea is found in north-eastern and far eastern Victoria, far south-eastern New South Wales, and in the Australian Capital Territory, growing in alpine and subalpine areas at altitudes above 800 m (2,600 ft), growing in heath and woodland (often bordered by grassland).
