= Bossiaea smithiorum =

Scientific classification
- Kingdom: Plantae
- Clade: Tracheophytes
- Clade: Angiosperms
- Clade: Eudicots
- Clade: Rosids
- Order: Fabales
- Family: Fabaceae
- Subfamily: Faboideae
- Genus: Bossiaea
- Species: B. smithiorum

Binomial name
- Bossiaea smithiorum J.H.Ross

Species of legume

Bossiaea smithiorum is a species of flowering plant in the family Fabaceae and is endemic to the south-west of Western Australia. It is a slender shrub with oblong to cylindrical leaves and orange-yellow and red or purple, pea-like flowers.

== Description ==
Bossiaea smithiorum is a slender shrub that typically grows up to 2 m (6 ft 7 in) high and 1.5 m (4 ft 11 in) wide with ridged branchlets. The leaves are oblong to almost cylindrical, 3.0–7.0 mm (0.12–0.28 in) long and 1–2 mm (0.039–0.079 in) wide on a petiole 0.4–0.8 mm (0.016–0.031 in) long with the edges curved down or rolled under. The flowers are arranged singly or in pairs, each flower on a hairy pedicel 3.5–7.0 mm (0.14–0.28 in) long, with oblong to broadly egg-shaped bracts 0.6–1.0 mm (0.024–0.039 in) long at the base. There are similar bracteoles on the pedicels but that fall off as the flower develops. The five sepals are more or less glabrous and joined at the base, forming a tube 2.0–2.6 mm (0.079–0.102 in) long, the two upper lobes 0.7–1.5 mm (0.028–0.059 in) long and the lower lobes slightly shorter. The standard petal is orange-yellow with a red or purplish base, and 8.2–8.6 mm (0.32–0.34 in) long, the wings are red or purple with yellow tips and 6.8–7.4 mm (0.27–0.29 in) long, and the keel yellow with a red or purplish tip and 4.8–5.5 mm (0.19–0.22 in) long. Flowering occurs from July to September and the fruit is a flattened pod 11–19 mm (0.43–0.75 in) long.

== Taxonomy and naming ==
Bossiaea smithiorum was first formally described in 1994 by James Henderson Ross in the journal Muelleria from specimens collected near Wattengutten Hill, east of Wongan Hills in 1993. The specific epithet (smithiorum) honours Basil and Mary Smith for their contributions to the study of the genus Bossiaea.

== Distribution and habitat ==
This bossiaea grows in low Eucalyptus woodland, often in the runoff zone near granite outcrops in the Avon Wheatbelt and Mallee biogeographic regions of south-western Western Australia.

== Conservation status ==
Bossiaea smithiorum is classified as "not threatened" by the Western Australian Government Department of Biodiversity, Conservation and Attractions.
