= Bossiaea dasycarpa =

Scientific classification
- Kingdom: Plantae
- Clade: Tracheophytes
- Clade: Angiosperms
- Clade: Eudicots
- Clade: Rosids
- Order: Fabales
- Family: Fabaceae
- Subfamily: Faboideae
- Genus: Bossiaea
- Species: B. dasycarpa

Binomial name
- Bossiaea dasycarpa I.Thomps.

Species of flowering plant

Bossiaea dasycarpa is a species of flowering plant in the family Fabaceae and is endemic to a small area in eastern Australia. It is a prostrate or low-lying shrub with narrow oblong to narrow elliptic leaves, and yellow and red flowers.

== Description ==
Bossiaea dasycarpa is a prostrate or low-lying shrub that typically grows to a height of up to about 40 cm (16 in) and has hairy stems. The leaves are narrow oblong to narrow elliptic, 10–20 mm (0.39–0.79 in) long and 3–7 mm (0.12–0.28 in) wide on a petiole 1.5–4 mm (0.059–0.157 in) long with triangular stipules 1.5–3 mm (0.059–0.118 in) long at the base. The flowers are arranged singly or in small groups on longer branchlets, each flower on a hairy pedicel 5–30 mm (0.20–1.18 in) long with a bract 1.0–1.5 mm (0.039–0.059 in) long. The sepals are about 4–5 mm (0.16–0.20 in) long with lance-shaped bracteoles 2–3 mm (0.079–0.118 in) long at the base of the sepal tube but that sometimes fall off as the flower opens. The petals are yellow, often with red on the back, the standard petal is up to about 10 mm (0.39 in) long and slightly longer than the wings and keel, the keel with a red tip. Flowering occurs in mid to late spring and the fruit is a narrow oblong pod 20–30 mm (0.79–1.18 in) long.

== Taxonomy and naming ==
Bossiaea dasycarpa was first formally described in 2012 by Ian R. Thompson in the journal Muelleria from specimens collected near Isis River in 1995. The specific epithet (dasycarpa) means "hairy fruit".

== Distribution and habitat ==
This bossiaea grows in woodland and grassland from near Maryborough in Queensland to near Hillgrove in New South Wales.
