= Bossiaea peninsularis =

Scientific classification
- Kingdom: Plantae
- Clade: Tracheophytes
- Clade: Angiosperms
- Clade: Eudicots
- Clade: Rosids
- Order: Fabales
- Family: Fabaceae
- Subfamily: Faboideae
- Genus: Bossiaea
- Species: B. peninsularis

Binomial name
- Bossiaea peninsularis I.Thomps.

Species of flowering plant

Bossiaea peninsularis is a species of flowering plant in the family Fabaceae and is endemic to the Eyre Peninsula in South Australia. It is an erect rhizome-forming, more or less leafless shrub with leaves reduced to small scales, and yellow, red and purplish flowers.

== Description ==
Bossiaea peninsularis is an erect, rhizome-forming shrub that typically grows to a height of up to 50 cm (20 in) with more or less glabrous, spreading cladodes 2–5 mm (0.079–0.197 in) wide. The leaves are reduced to scales 2.0–2.5 mm (0.079–0.098 in) long and 0.3–0.5 mm (0.012–0.020 in) wide. The flowers are borne on a pedicel 3–4 mm (0.12–0.16 in) long with two bract-like scales 1–1.5 mm (0.039–0.059 in) long, a bract 2.0–2.5 mm (0.079–0.098 in) long at the base and bracteoles 2.0–2.5 mm (0.079–0.098 in) long on the upper part of the pedicel. The five sepals are 3.5–4.0 mm (0.14–0.16 in) long and joined at the base with the two upper lobes about 1.8 mm (0.071 in) wide and the lower lobes 1.0–1.2 mm (0.039–0.047 in) wide. The standard petal is yellow with a red base and up to about 10 mm (0.39 in) long, the wings are purplish and about 2 mm (0.079 in) wide, and the keel is red with a purplish base and about 2.5 mm (0.098 in) wide. Flowering occurs from August to October and the fruit is a pod.

== Taxonomy and naming ==
Bossiaea peninsularis was first formally described in 2012 by Ian R. Thompson in the journal Muelleria from specimens collected near Karkoo in 2000. The specific epithet (peninsularis) means egg-shaped with the widest part above the middle, referring to the shape of the leaves.

== Distribution and habitat ==
This bossiaea grows in mallee woodland on the Eyre Peninsula in South Australia.
