= Bossiaea distichoclada =

Scientific classification
- Kingdom: Plantae
- Clade: Tracheophytes
- Clade: Angiosperms
- Clade: Eudicots
- Clade: Rosids
- Order: Fabales
- Family: Fabaceae
- Subfamily: Faboideae
- Genus: Bossiaea
- Species: B. distichoclada

Binomial name
- Bossiaea distichoclada F.Muell.

Species of legume

Bossiaea distichoclada is a species of flowering plant in the family Fabaceae and is endemic to south-eastern continental Australia. It is an erect shrub with hairy branches, kidney-shaped to more or less round or heart-shaped leaves with the narrower end towards the base, and uniformly bright yellow flowers.

== Description ==
Bossiaea distichoclada is an erect shrub that typically grows to a height of up to about 1 m (3 ft 3 in) and has hairy branches. The leaves are arranged in two rows along the stems, kidney-shaped to more or less round, or heart-shaped with the narrower end towards the base, 1–2.5 mm (0.039–0.098 in) long and 2–4 mm (0.079–0.157 in) wide on a petiole 0.2–0.5 mm (0.0079–0.0197 in) long with more or less persistent triangular stipules 1.5–4 mm (0.059–0.157 in) long at the base. The flowers are 5–7 mm (0.20–0.28 in) long and arranged singly in leaf axils, each flower on a pedicel 1–2 mm (0.039–0.079 in) long with crowded, broadly egg-shaped bracts 1.5–3 mm (0.059–0.118 in) long. The sepals are 2.5–3.5 mm (0.098–0.138 in) long with narrow elliptic bracteoles 2.5–4.5 mm (0.098–0.177 in) long near the base of the sepal tube. The petals are uniformly bright yellow, about 8 mm (0.31 in) long, and more or less equal in length. Flowering occurs from December to January and the fruit is more or less spherical pod 5–8 mm (0.20–0.31 in) long.

== Taxonomy and naming ==
Bossiaea distichoclada was first formally described in 1855 by Ferdinand von Mueller in his book Definitions of rare or hitherto undescribed Australian plants.

== Distribution and habitat ==
This species grows in montane to subalpine woodland in north-eastern Victoria and far south-eastern New South Wales.
