= Bossiaea oxyclada =

Conservation status
- Vulnerable (IUCN 3.1)

Scientific classification
- Kingdom: Plantae
- Clade: Tracheophytes
- Clade: Angiosperms
- Clade: Eudicots
- Clade: Rosids
- Order: Fabales
- Family: Fabaceae
- Subfamily: Faboideae
- Genus: Bossiaea
- Species: B. oxyclada

Binomial name
- Bossiaea oxyclada Turcz.
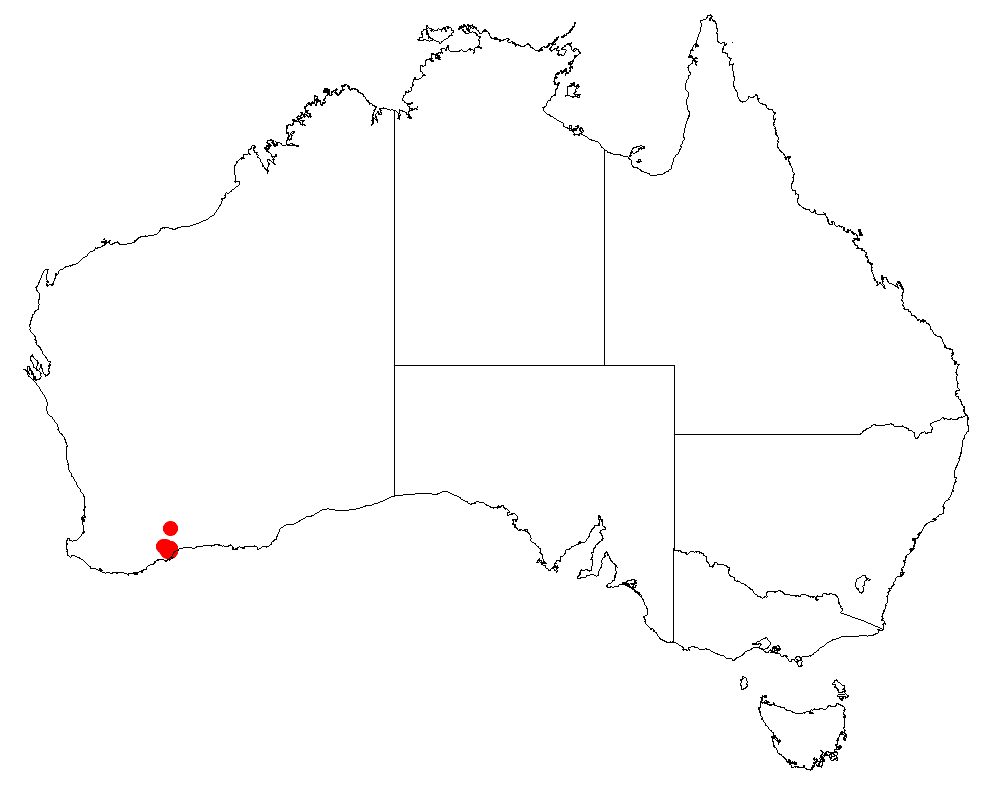
- Range map generated from data at Australasian Virtual Herbarium

Synonyms
- Bossiaea rufa var. oxyclada (Turcz.) Benth.

Species of legume

Bossiaea oxyclada is a species of flowering plant in the family Fabaceae and is endemic to the south of Western Australia. It is an erect, rigid shrub with flattened branches, cladodes ending with a sharp point, leaves mostly reduced to small scales, and golden yellow and deep red flowers.

== Description ==
Bossiaea oxyclada is an erect, rigid shrub that typically grows to 90 cm (35 in) high, 60 cm (24 in) wide and has flattened branches and cladodes 2–4 mm (0.079–0.157 in) wide ending in a sharp point. The leaves on older growth are reduced to triangular scales 0.5–1 mm (0.020–0.039 in) long. New growth sometimes has more or less round leaves 4–20 mm (0.16–0.79 in) long and 4–12 mm (0.16–0.47 in) wide on a petiole 1.5–3.5 mm (0.059–0.138 in) long with stipules 1.7–3.5 mm (0.067–0.138 in) long at the base. The flowers are arranged singly in nodes on a pedicel 2.0–4.5 mm (0.079–0.177 in) long with overlapping, pinkish-brown bracts up to 1.3 mm (0.051 in) long at the base and bracteoles near the middle of the pedicels. The sepals are joined at the base forming a tube 2.0–4.1 mm (0.079–0.161 in) long, the two upper lobes slightly longer than the lower three lobes. The standard petal is golden yellow with a red base, 8.7–12.5 mm (0.34–0.49 in) long, the wings are 8.0–11.6 mm (0.31–0.46 in) long and the keel deep red and 8.2–11.2 mm (0.32–0.44 in) long. Flowering occurs from September to October and the fruit is pod 20–23 mm (0.79–0.91 in) long.

== Taxonomy and naming ==
Bossiaea oxyclada was first formally described in 1853 by Nikolai Turczaninow in the Bulletin de la Société impériale des naturalistes de Moscou from specimens collected by James Drummond. The specific epithet (oxyclada) means "sharp branch".

== Distribution and habitat ==
This bossiaea is found in the western part of the Fitzgerald River National Park in the Esperance Plains and Mallee biogeographic regions, where it grows in a sandplain community with scattered eucalypts.

== Conservation status ==
Bossiaea oxyclada is classified as "Priority Four" by the Government of Western Australia Department of Parks and Wildlife, meaning that it is rare or near threatened.
