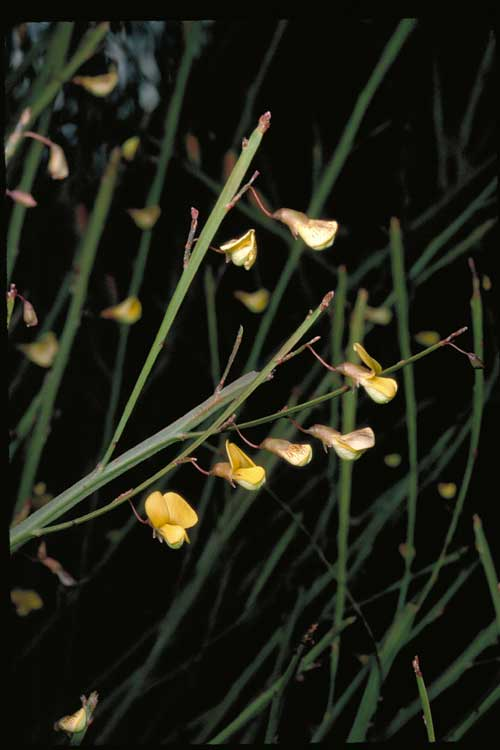

Scientific classification
- Kingdom: Plantae
- Clade: Embryophytes
- Clade: Tracheophytes
- Clade: Spermatophytes
- Clade: Angiosperms
- Clade: Eudicots
- Clade: Rosids
- Order: Fabales
- Family: Fabaceae
- Subfamily: Faboideae
- Genus: Bossiaea
- Species: B. rufa

Binomial name
- Bossiaea rufa R.Br.
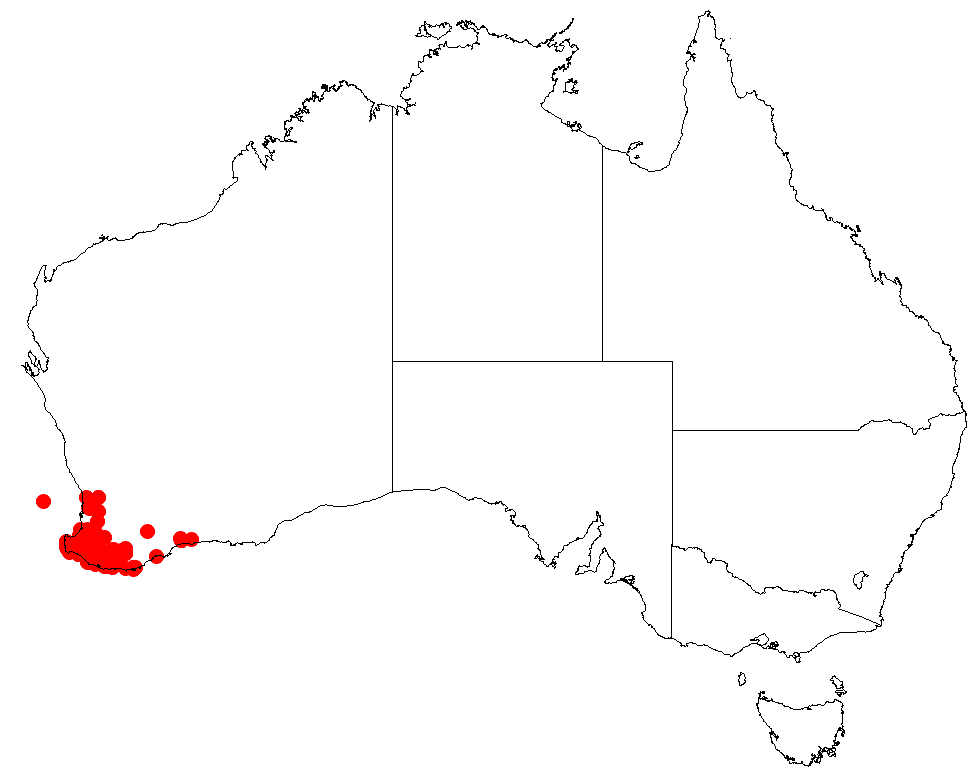
- Range map generated from data at Australasian Virtual Herbarium

= Bossiaea rufa =

Species of legume

Bossiaea rufa is a species of flowering plant in the family Fabaceae and is endemic to the south-west of Western Australia. It is a loose, many-branched shrub with elliptic to egg-shaped leaves with the narrower end towards the base, and deep yellow and red flowers.

== Description ==
Bossiaea rufa is a loose, many-branched shrub that typically grows to a height of up to 2 m (6 ft 7 in) when supported by surrounding vegetation. The stems are flattened and winged, up to 10 mm (0.39 in) wide and are sometimes leafless. The leaves, when present, are elliptic to egg-shaped with the narrower end towards the base, mostly 7–15 mm (0.28–0.59 in) long and 5–8 mm (0.20–0.31 in) wide on a petiole 1.5–4.5 mm (0.059–0.177 in) long with egg-shaped stipules 1–3 mm (0.039–0.118 in) long at the base. The flowers are arranged singly or in pairs in leaf axils on pedicels 5–10 mm (0.20–0.39 in) long, with egg-shaped bracts 1–2 mm (0.039–0.079 in) long at the base. The five sepals are 5.7–6 mm (0.22–0.24 in) long and joined at the base, forming a tube 2.0–3.6 mm (0.079–0.142 in) long, the two upper lobes 3.7–5.2 mm (0.15–0.20 in) long and the lower lobes 1.2–1.8 mm (0.047–0.071 in) long. The standard petal is deep yellow with a purplish-red base and 9.5–12.2 mm (0.37–0.48 in) long, the wings reddish and 8.1–8.9 mm (0.32–0.35 in) long, and the keel reddish and 7.2–7.5 mm (0.28–0.30 in) long. Flowering occurs from September to January and the fruit is an oblong pod 25–38 mm (0.98–1.50 in) long.

== Taxonomy and naming ==
Bossiaea rufa was first formally described in 1812 by Robert Brown in Hortus Kewensis. The specific epithet (rufa) means "reddish-brown".

== Distribution and habitat ==
This bossiaea usually grows in sandy soil in moist places near streams and swamps in the Esperance Plains, Jarrah Forest, Mallee, Swan Coastal Plain and Warren biogeographic regions of south-western Western Australia.

== Conservation status ==
Bossiaea rufa is classified as "not threatened" by the Government of Western Australia Department of Biodiversity, Conservation and Attractions.
