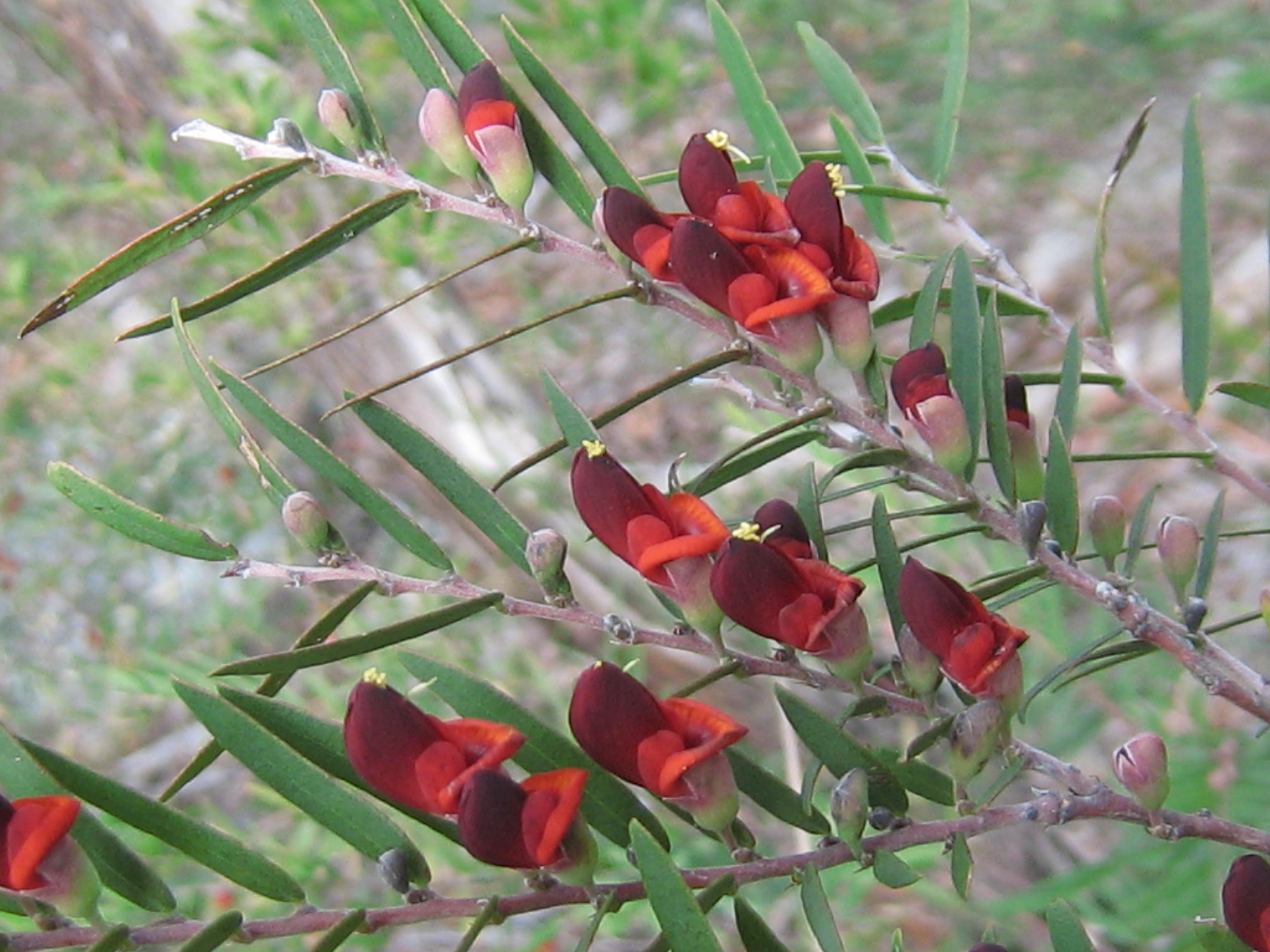
- Bossiaea rupicola

Scientific classification
- Kingdom: Plantae
- Clade: Embryophytes
- Clade: Tracheophytes
- Clade: Spermatophytes
- Clade: Angiosperms
- Clade: Eudicots
- Clade: Rosids
- Order: Fabales
- Family: Fabaceae
- Subfamily: Faboideae
- Genus: Bossiaea
- Species: B. rupicola

Binomial name
- Bossiaea rupicola A.Cunn. ex Benth.
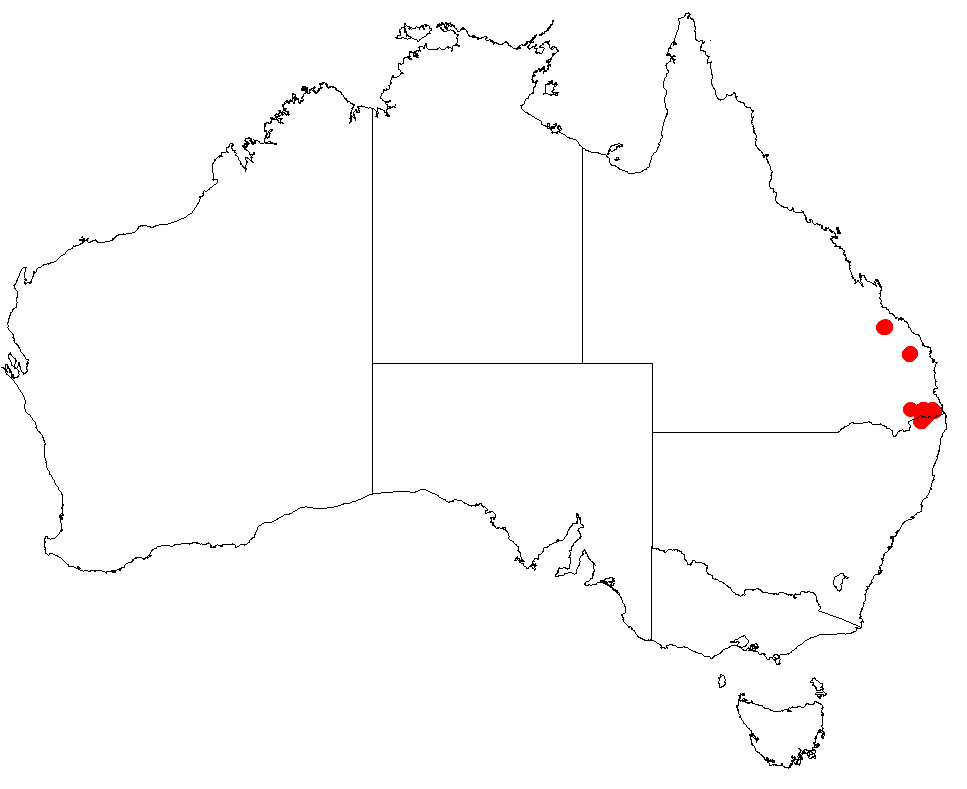
- Occurrence data from the AVH

= Bossiaea rupicola =

Species of legume

Bossiaea rupicola is a species of flowering plant in the family Fabaceae and is endemic to eastern Australia. It is an erect shrub or small tree with silky-hairy, narrow egg-shaped to narrow elliptic leaves and red flowers with yellow markings.

== Description ==
Bossiaea rupicola is an erect shrub that typically grows to a height of 2–4 m (6 ft 7 in – 13 ft 1 in) and has silky-hairy young stems that become glabrous with age. The leaves are arranged in two vertical rows along the stems and are narrow egg-shaped to narrow elliptic, 12–20 mm (0.47–0.79 in) long and 3–6 mm (0.12–0.24 in) wide on a petiole 0.5–1 mm (0.020–0.039 in) long with stipules up to 1 mm (0.039 in) long at the base. The leaves have silky hairs pressed against both surfaces, but become glabrous with age.

The flowers are about 20 mm (0.79 in) long on pedicels 3–5 mm (0.12–0.20 in) long with a few bracts less than 1 mm (0.039 in) long at the base and similar bracteoles near the base of the pedicel. The five sepals are 5–7 mm (0.20–0.28 in) long and joined at the base forming a tube, the upper lobes 2.5–4 mm (0.098–0.157 in) long and 3 mm (0.12 in) wide, the lower lobes shorter and narrower. The standard petal is yellow with a red back and up to 10 mm (0.39 in) long, the wings are 4–5 mm (0.16–0.20 in) wide, and the keel is red and 5–8 mm (0.20–0.31 in) longer than the standard. Flowering occurs from late winter to spring and the fruit is a more or less oblong pod 15–40 mm (0.59–1.57 in) long.

== Taxonomy ==
Bossiaea rupicola was first formally in 1864 by George Bentham in Flora Australiensis from an unpublished description by Allan Cunningham.

== Distribution and habitat ==
This pea grows in open forest, woodland and heathland, often between rocks and mostly occurs on the McPherson Range near the New South Wales - Queensland border, but also in the Kroombit Tops National Park and near Biloela and Biggenden further north.
