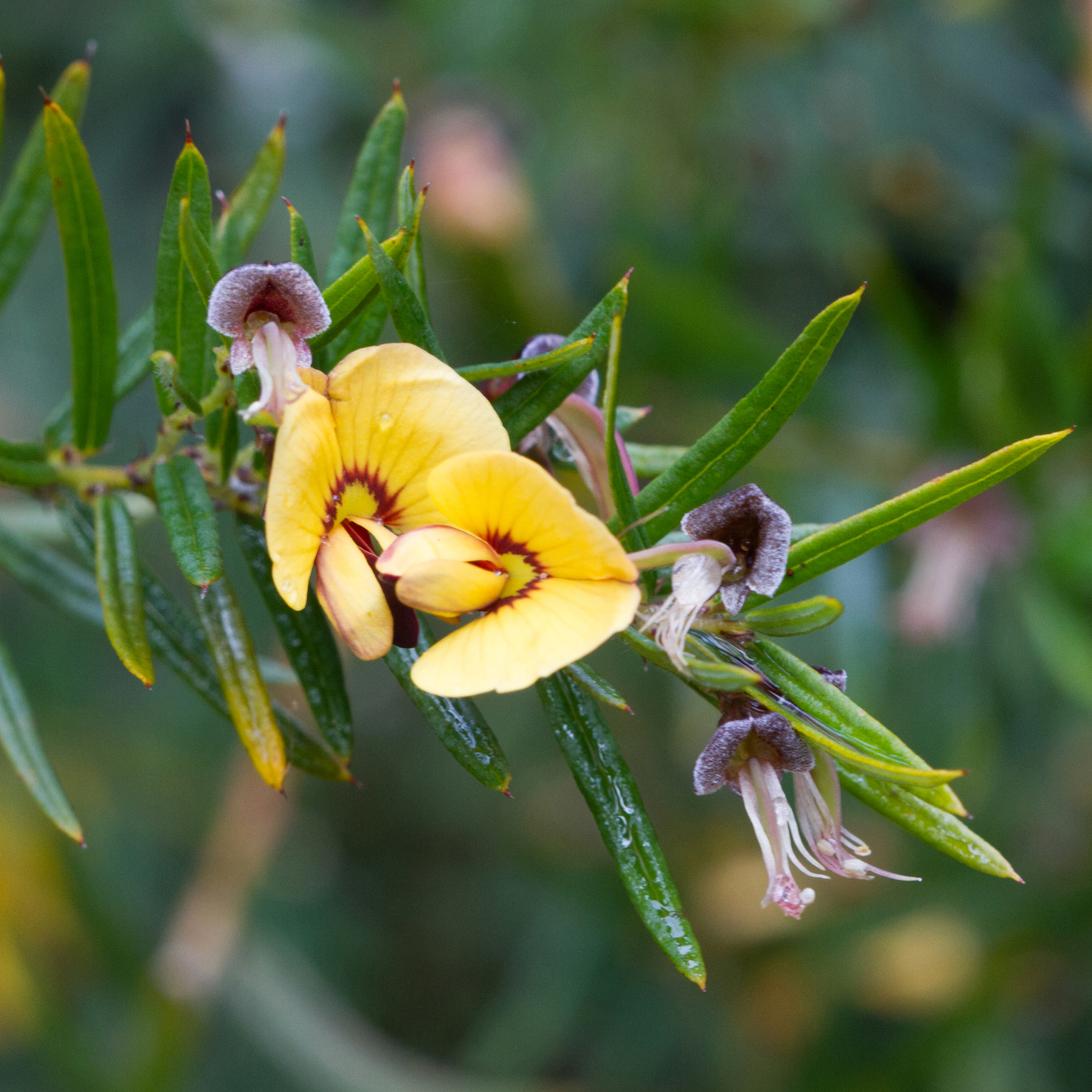

Scientific classification
- Kingdom: Plantae
- Clade: Embryophytes
- Clade: Tracheophytes
- Clade: Spermatophytes
- Clade: Angiosperms
- Clade: Eudicots
- Clade: Rosids
- Order: Fabales
- Family: Fabaceae
- Subfamily: Faboideae
- Genus: Bossiaea
- Species: B. rosmarinifolia

Binomial name
- Bossiaea rosmarinifolia Lindl.

Synonyms
- Bossiaea cinerea var. rosmarinifolia (Lindl.) Benth.

= Bossiaea rosmarinifolia =

Grampians bossiaea

Species of legume

Bossiaea rosmarinifolia, commonly known as Grampians bossiaea, is a species of flowering plant in the family Fabaceae and is endemic to the Grampians in Victoria. It is an erect or spreading shrub with linear leaves and yellow and red flowers.

== Description ==
Bossiaea rosmarinifolia is an erect or spreading shrub that typically grows to a height of 2.5–3 m (8 ft 2 in – 9 ft 10 in), and has cylindrical stems. The leaves are linear, 10–28 mm (0.39–1.10 in) long and 1–3 mm (0.039–0.118 in) wide on a petiole up to 1.5 mm (0.059 in) long with reddish stipules 2–4 mm (0.079–0.157 in) long at the base. The flowers are arranged singly or in pairs and are 7–12 mm (0.28–0.47 in) long on a thread-like pedicel 6–8 mm (0.24–0.31 in) long with crowded bracts less than 1 mm (0.039 in) long at the base and bracteoles about 1 mm (0.039 in) long near the middle of the pedicel. The five sepals are 3–5 mm (0.12–0.20 in) long and joined at the base forming a tube, the upper lobes 1–2.5 mm (0.039–0.098 in) long and 2.5–3 mm (0.098–0.118 in) wide, the lower lobes shorter and much narrower. The standard petal is yellow with a red base and up to 12 mm (0.47 in) long, the wings yellow with red or brownish markings and about 2.5 mm (0.098 in) wide, and the keel is red and about 3.5 mm (0.14 in) wide. Flowering occurs from September to October and the fruit is an elliptic pod 10–15 mm (0.39–0.59 in) long.

== Taxonomy ==
Bossiaea rosmarinifolia was first formally described in 1838 by John Lindley in Thomas Mitchell's journal, Three Expeditions into the interior of Eastern Australia. The specific epithet (rosmarinifolia) means "Rosmarinus-leaved".

== Distribution and habitat ==
Grampians bossiaea grows in open forest in the Grampians National Park.
