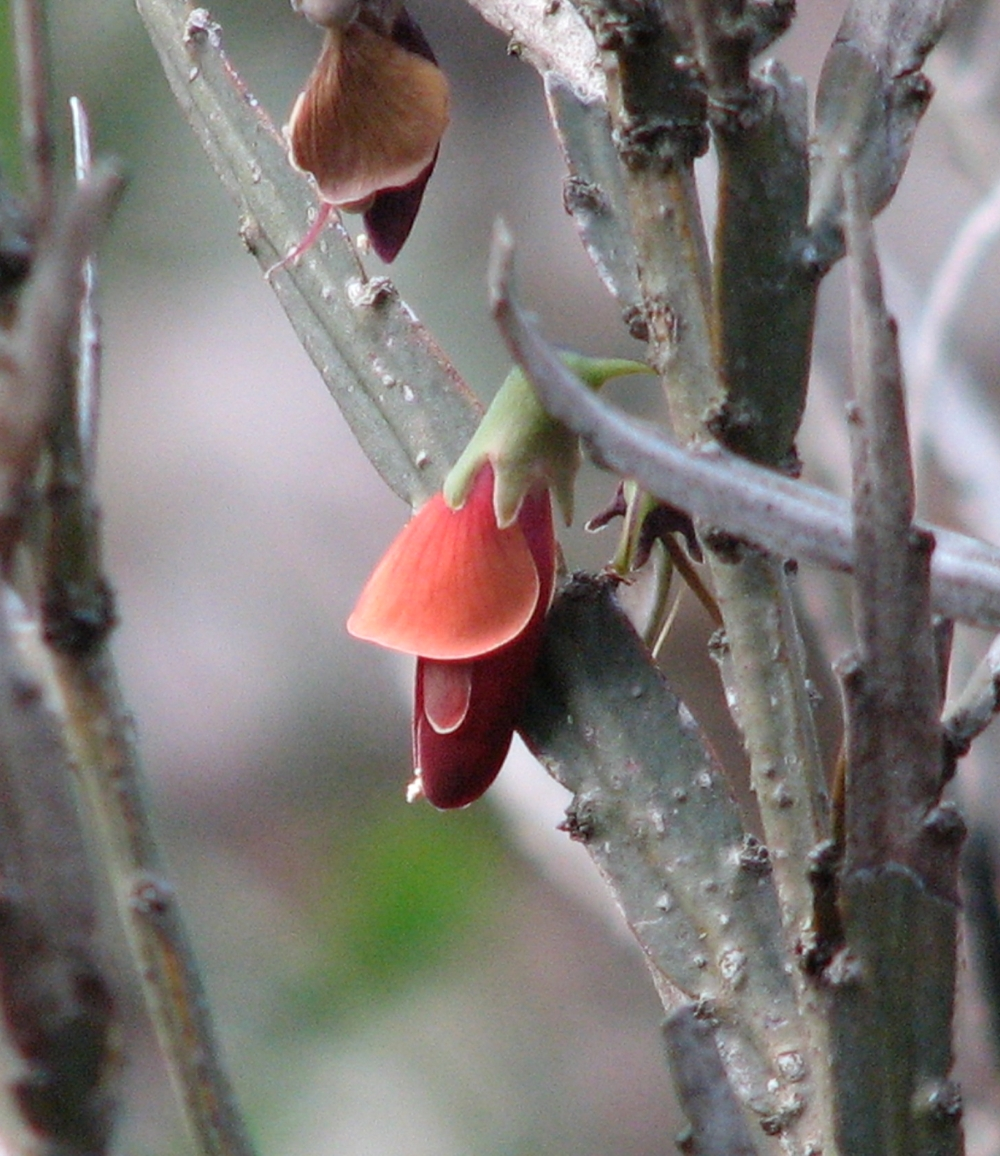
- Bossiaea walkeri

Scientific classification
- Kingdom: Plantae
- Clade: Tracheophytes
- Clade: Angiosperms
- Clade: Eudicots
- Clade: Rosids
- Order: Fabales
- Family: Fabaceae
- Subfamily: Faboideae
- Clade: Mirbelioids
- Genus: Bossiaea; Vent. (1800), nom. cons.

Species
- See text

Synonyms
- Lalage Lindl. (1834); Scottia R.Br. (1812)

= Bossiaea =

Genus of legumes

Bossiaea is a genus of about 78 species of flowering plants in the pea family Fabaceae and is endemic to Australia. Plants in this genus often have stems and branches modified as cladodes, simple, often much reduced leaves, flowers with the upper two sepal lobes larger than the lower three, usually orange to yellow petals with reddish markings, and the fruit a more or less flattened pod.

== Description ==
Plants in the genus Bossiaea are shrubs, often with the stems and branches modified as cladodes, the leaves simple and often reduces to scales, usually with small stipules at the base. The flowers are usually arranged singly in leaf axils, usually with two or three small bracts or bracteoles at the base of the peduncle. There are five sepals, the upper two usually larger and united higher than the lower three. The petals are mostly orange to yellow, often with darker markings and the standard is about twice as long as the sepals. The stamens are united into a sheath that is split on the upper side and the fruit is a flattened pod containing seeds with an aril.

== Taxonomy ==
The genus Bossiaea was first formally described in 1800 by Étienne Pierre Ventenat in his book, Description des Plantes Nouvelles et peu connues, cultivées dans le Jardin de J.M. Cels and the first species he described was Bossiaea heterophylla. The genus is named in honour of Joseph Hugues Boissieu La Martinière, a botanist on La Pérouse's expedition to Australia.

=== Species list ===
The following is a list of species of Bossiaea accepted by the Australian Plant Census as at July 2021:

- Bossiaea alpina I.Thomps. (Vic.)
- Bossiaea angustifolia (Meisn.) Keighery
- Bossiaea aquifolium Benth. ― water bush (W.A.)
  - Bossiaea aquifolium Benth. subsp. aquifolium
  - Bossiaea aquifolium subsp. laidlawiana (Tovey & P.Morris) J.H.Ross
- Bossiaea arcuata J.H.Ross (W.A.)
- Bossiaea arenicola J.H.Ross (Qld.)
- Bossiaea arenitensis R.L.Barrett (W.A.)
- Bossiaea armitii F.Muell. (Qld.)
- Bossiaea atrata J.H.Ross (W.A.)
- Bossiaea aurantiaca J.H.Ross (W.A.)
- Bossiaea barbarae J.H.Ross (W.A.)
- Bossiaea barrettiorum J.H.Ross (W.A.)
- Bossiaea bombayensis K.L.McDougall – Bombay bossiaea (N.S.W.)
- Bossiaea bossiaeoides (A.Cunn. ex Benth.) Court (W.A., N.T., Qld.)
- Bossiaea bracteosa F.Muell. ex Benth. ― mountain leafless bossiaea (Vic.)
- Bossiaea brownii Benth. (Qld.)
- Bossiaea buxifolia A.Cunn. – matted bossiaea (Qld., N.S.W., A.C.T., Vic.)
- Bossiaea calcicola J.H.Ross (W.A.)
- Bossiaea carinalis Benth. (QLD.)
- Bossiaea celata J.H.Ross (W.A.)
- Bossiaea cinerea R.Br. – showy bossiaea (S.A., N.S.W., Vic., Tas.)
- Bossiaea concinna Benth. (W.A.)
- Bossiaea concolor (Maiden & Betche) I.Thomps. (Qld., N.S.W.)
- Bossiaea cordigera Hook.f. – wiry bossiaea (Vic., Tas.)
- Bossiaea cucullata J.H.Ross (W.A.)
- Bossiaea dasycarpa I.Thomps. (Qld., N.S.W.)
- Bossiaea decumbens F.Muell. (Vic.)
- Bossiaea dentata (R.Br.) Benth. (W.A.)
- Bossiaea disticha Lindl. (W.A.)
- Bossiaea distichoclada F.Muell. (Vic., N.S.W.)
- Bossiaea divaricata Turcz. (W.A.)
- Bossiaea ensata Sieber ex DC. – sword bossiaea (Qld., N.S.W., Vic., S.A.)
- Bossiaea eremaea J.H.Ross (W.A.)
- Bossiaea eriocarpa Benth. – common brown pea (W.A.)
- Bossiaea flexuosa J.H.Ross (W.A.)
- Bossiaea foliosa A.Cunn. – leafy bossiaea (N.S.W., A.C.T., Vic.)
- Bossiaea fragrans K.L.McDougall (N.S.W.)
- Bossiaea grayi K.L.McDougall – Murrumbidgee bossiaea (A.C.T.)
- Bossiaea halophila J.H.Ross. (W.A.)
- Bossiaea heterophylla Vent. – variable bossiaea (Qld., N.S.W., Vic., Tas.)
- Bossiaea inundata J.H.Ross (W.A.)
- Bossiaea kiamensis Benth. (N.S.W.)
- Bossiaea laxa J.H.Ross (W.A.)
- Bossiaea lenticularis Sieber ex DC. (N.S.W.)
- Bossiaea leptacantha E.Pritz. (W.A.)
- Bossiaea linophylla R.Br. (W.A.)
- Bossiaea milesiae K.L.McDougall (N.S.W.)
- Bossiaea modesta J.H.Ross (W.A.)
- Bossiaea neoanglica F.Muell. (N.S.W., Qld.)
- Bossiaea nummularia Endl. (N.S.W.)
- Bossiaea obcordata (Vent.) Druce – spiny bossiaea (N.S.W., Vic., Qld.)
- Bossiaea obovata I.Thomps. (Qld., N.S.W.)
- Bossiaea oligosperma A.T.Lee (N.S.W.)
- Bossiaea ornata (Lindl.) Benth. (W.A.)
- Bossiaea oxyclada Turcz. (W.A.)
- Bossiaea peduncularis Turcz. (W.A.)
- Bossiaea peninsularis I.Thomps. (S.A.)
- Bossiaea praetermissa J.H.Ross (W.A.)
- Bossiaea preissii Meisn. (W.A.)
- Bossiaea prostrata R.Br. – creeping bossiaea (Qld., N.S.W., Vic., S.A., Tas.)
- Bossiaea pulchella Meisn. (W.A.)
- Bossiaea rhombifolia Sieber ex DC. (N.S.W., Qld.)
- Bossiaea riparia A.Cunn. ex Benth. – river leafless bossiaea (N.S.W., A.C.T., Vic., Tas.)
- Bossiaea rosmarinifolia Lindl. – Grampians bossiaea (Vic.)
- Bossiaea rufa R.Br. (W.A.)
- Bossiaea rupicola A.Cunn. ex Benth. (N.S.W., Qld.)
- Bossiaea saxosa J.H.Ross (W.A.)
- Bossiaea scolopendria (Andrews) Sm. (N.S.W.)
- Bossiaea scortechinii F.Muell. (Qld., N.S.W.)
- Bossiaea sericea I.Thomps. (N.S.W., A.C.T., Vic.)
- Bossiaea simulata J.H.Ross (W.A.)
- Bossiaea smithiorum J.H.Ross (W.A.)
- Bossiaea spinescens Meisn. (W.A.)
- Bossiaea spinosa (Turcz.) Domin (W.A.)
- Bossiaea stephensonii F.Muell. (N.S.W.)
- Bossiaea tasmanica I.Thomps. (Tas.)
- Bossiaea vombata J.H.Ross – wombat bossiaea (Vic.)
- Bossiaea walkeri F.Muell. – cactus bossiaea, cactus pea (W.A., S.A., N.S.W., Vic.)
- Bossiaea webbii F.Muell. – water bush (W.A.)
- Bossiaea zarae R.L.Barrett – Princess May winged pea (W.A.)

== Distribution ==
Species of Bossiaea occur in all Australian states and mainland territories, including seven in Tasmania and one (Bossiaea bossiaeoides in the Northern Territory.
