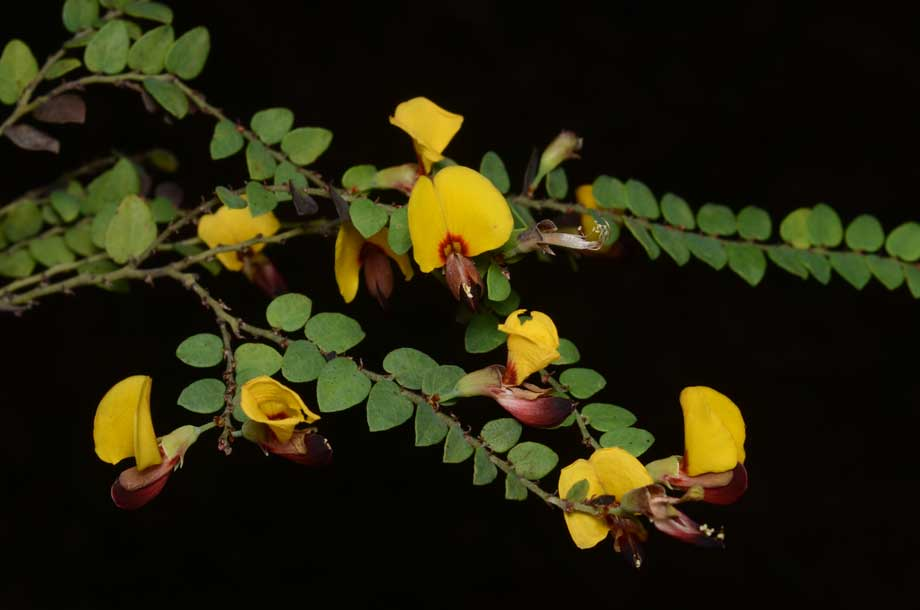
- In Robinson Gorge, Expedition National Park

Conservation status
- Least Concern (NCA)

Scientific classification
- Kingdom: Plantae
- Clade: Tracheophytes
- Clade: Angiosperms
- Clade: Eudicots
- Clade: Rosids
- Order: Fabales
- Family: Fabaceae
- Subfamily: Faboideae
- Genus: Bossiaea
- Species: B. brownii

Binomial name
- Bossiaea brownii Benth.
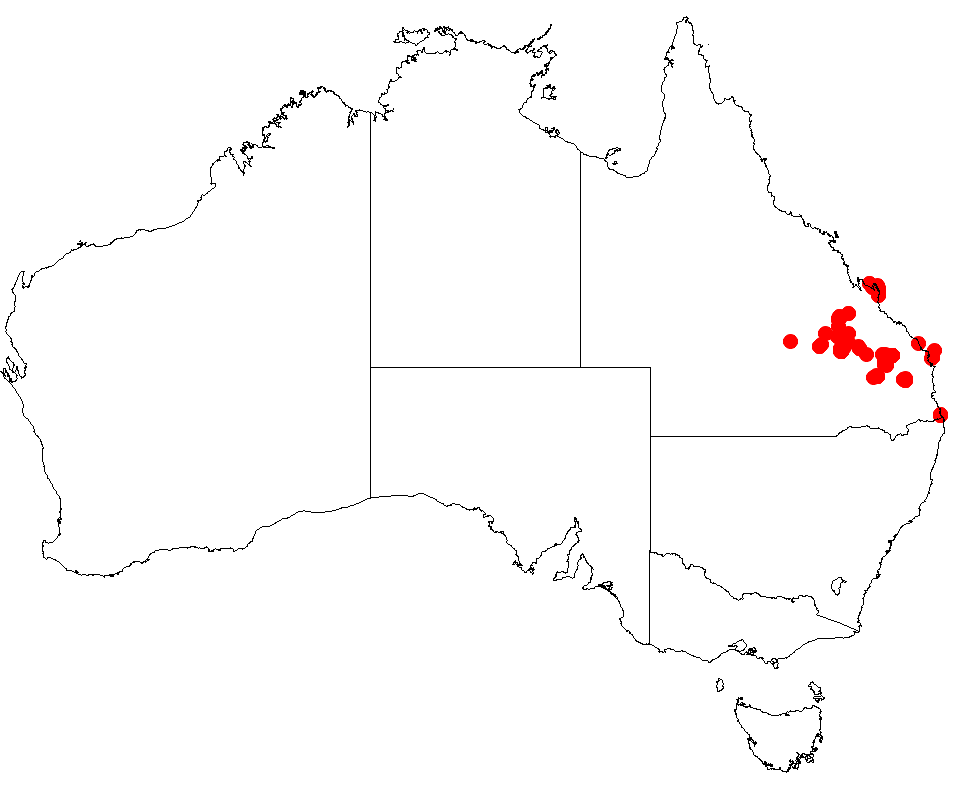
- Occurrence data from the Australasian Virtual Herbarium

= Bossiaea brownii =

Species of legume

Bossiaea brownii is a species of flowering plant in the family Fabaceae and is endemic to eastern Queensland. It is an erect shrub with egg-shaped leaves and yellow flowers with red markings.

== Description ==
Bossiaea brownii is an erect shrub that typically grows to a height of up to 3 m (9.8 ft) and has hairy branchlets. The leaves are egg-shaped, mostly 3–12 mm (0.12–0.47 in) long and 2–8 mm (0.079–0.315 in) wide on a petiole 0.5–0.8 mm (0.020–0.031 in) long with narrow triangular stipules 1–3 mm (0.039–0.118 in) long at the base. The flowers are usually borne on short side branches, each flower on a pedicel 0.5–6 mm (0.020–0.236 in) long with a bract 1–2 mm (0.039–0.079 in) long and similarly-sized bracteoles at the base. The sepals are 3.5–4.0 mm (0.14–0.16 in) long and joined at the base with the upper lobes 1–1.8 mm (0.039–0.071 in) long and the lower lobes slightly shorter. The standard petal is yellow with a red base and about 10 mm (0.39 in) long, the wings purplish and 8.0–9.5 mm (0.31–0.37 in) long, and the keel pink grading to dark red and slightly longer than the standard petal. Flowering occurs in most months and the fruit is an oblong to elliptic pod 15–40 mm (0.59–1.57 in) long.

== Taxonomy ==
Bossiaea brownii was first formally described in 1864 by George Bentham in Flora Australiensis, including from specimens collected by Robert Brown at Port Bowen.

== Distribution and habitat ==
This bossiaea grows in woodland and forest, often in gorges and is found south from Shoalwater Bay and as far inland as Springsure in eastern Queensland.
