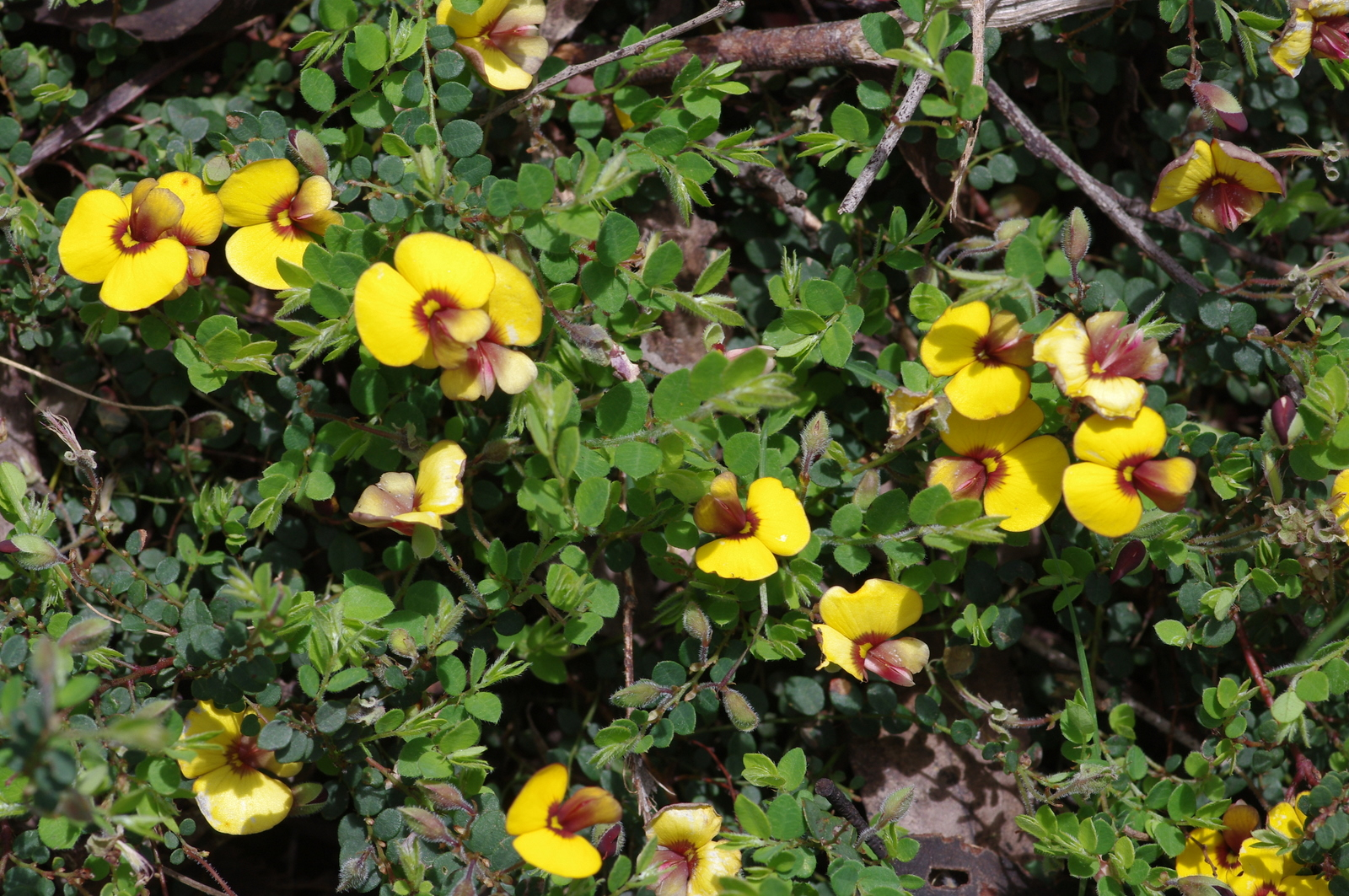
- Bossiaea decumbens

Scientific classification
- Kingdom: Plantae
- Clade: Tracheophytes
- Clade: Angiosperms
- Clade: Eudicots
- Clade: Rosids
- Order: Fabales
- Family: Fabaceae
- Subfamily: Faboideae
- Genus: Bossiaea
- Species: B. decumbens

Binomial name
- Bossiaea decumbens F.Muell.
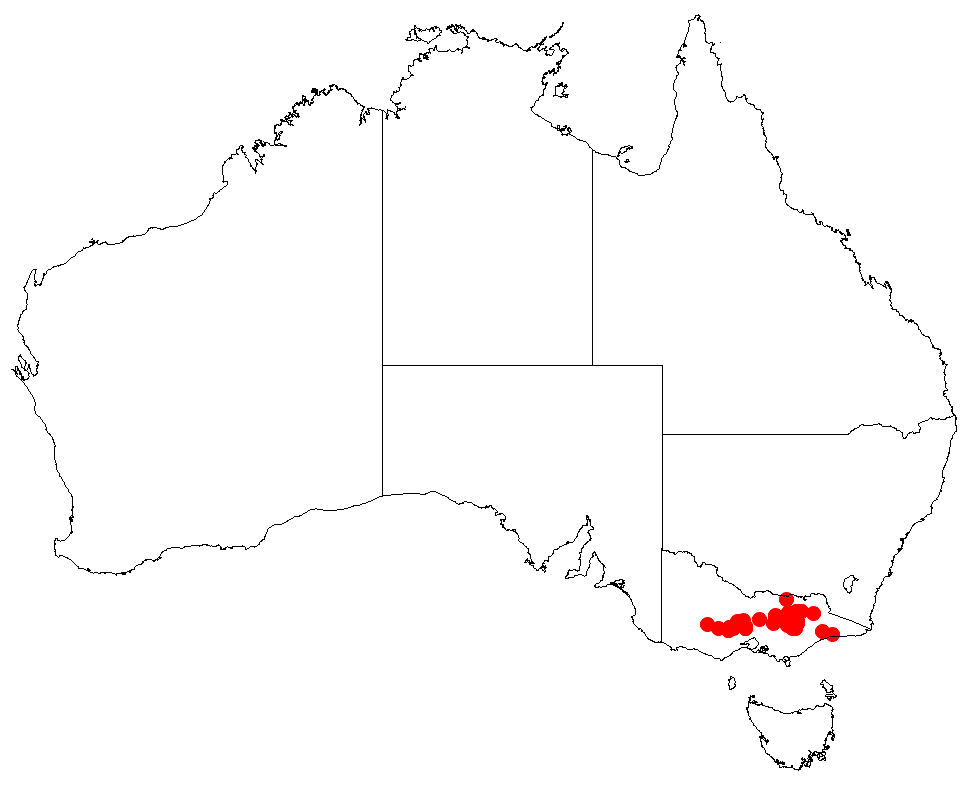
- Occurrence data from AVH

= Bossiaea decumbens =

Species of legume

Bossiaea decumbens is a spreading, prostrate shrub in the pea family (Fabaceae), and is endemic to Victoria. It has alternate, variable shaped leaves and yellow pea flowers with red splotches from spring to late summer.

== Description ==
Bossiaea decumbens is a prostrate shrub growing to about 30 cm (12 in) high, occasionally forming a mat-like appearance. The stems are needle-shaped with scant, flattened or spreading hairs. The leaves are arranged alternately, elliptic to egg-shaped or broad, 2–5 mm (0.079–0.197 in) long, 1.5–4 mm (0.059–0.157 in) wide, sometimes heart-shaped at base, upper and lower leaf surface a different shade of green. The leaf lower surface is smooth with mostly obvious venation and the edges curved, on a short petiole. The stipules are triangular, thin and much longer than the petiole. The single flowers are 8–10 mm (0.31–0.39 in) long, usually in clusters at the end of short, side branches. The pedicels are 10–25 mm (0.39–0.98 in) long, bracts up to 1.5 mm (0.059 in) long, bracteoles 1–2 mm (0.039–0.079 in) long and inserted near the apex of the pedicel and remain at maturity. The yellow pea flowers have a splotch of red, the lower petals smaller than the upper lobes that are 2.5–3.5 mm (0.098–0.138 in) long and marginally longer than the 6 mm (0.24 in) long keel or wings of the flower. The seed pods are narrow, oblong shaped and 2–3 cm (0.79–1.18 in) long. Flowering occurs from September to February.

== Taxonomy and naming ==
Bossiaea decumbens was first formally described by Ferdinand von Mueller in 1858 and the description was published in Fragmenta Phytographiae Australiae. The specific epithet (decumbens) is derived from Latin meaning "prostrate".

== Distribution and habitat ==
This species is found at higher altitudes in Victoria in a variety of growing conditions in woodlands, heath, sclerophyll forests and grassland locations.
