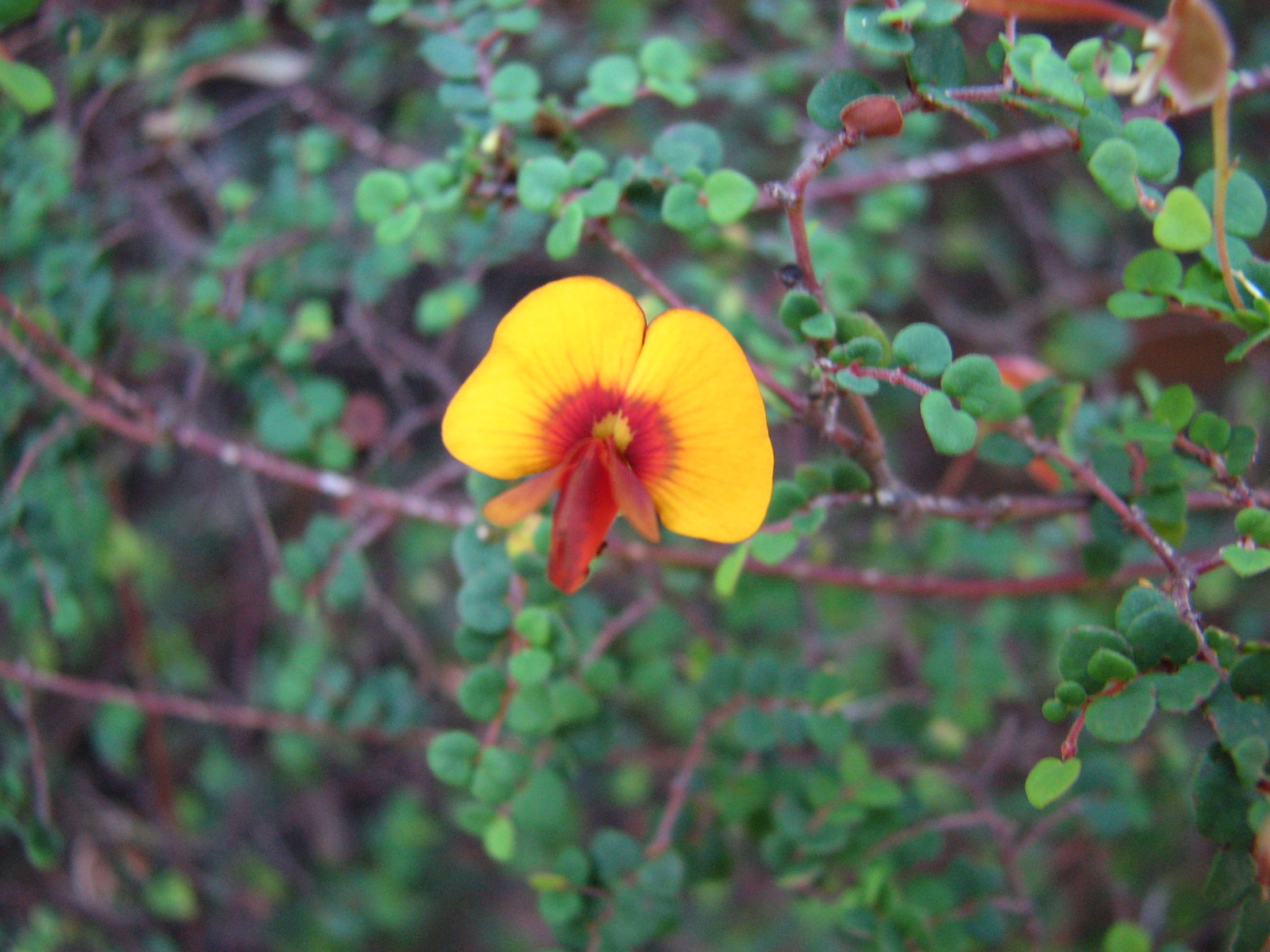

Scientific classification
- Kingdom: Plantae
- Clade: Tracheophytes
- Clade: Angiosperms
- Clade: Eudicots
- Clade: Rosids
- Order: Fabales
- Family: Fabaceae
- Subfamily: Faboideae
- Genus: Bossiaea
- Species: B. cordigera

Binomial name
- Bossiaea cordigera Benth. ex Hook.f.
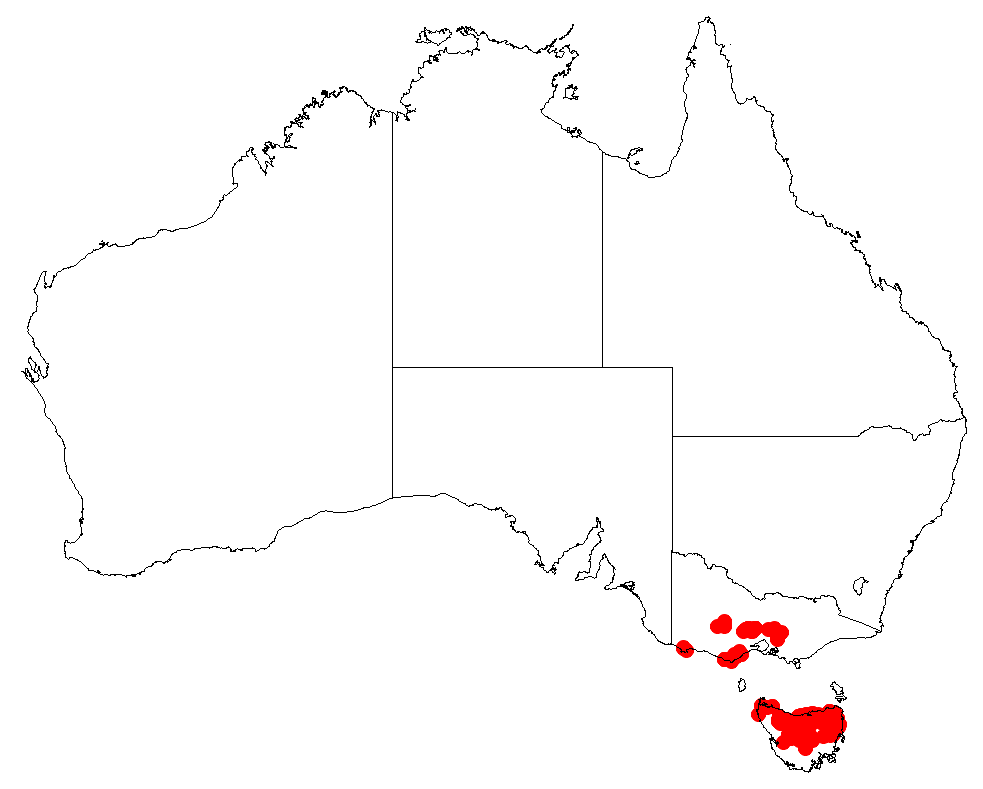
- Occurrence data from AVH

= Bossiaea cordigera =

Wiry bossiaea

Species of legume

Bossiaea cordigera , commonly known as wiry bossiaea, is a species of flowering plant in the family Fabaceae and is endemic to southern Australia. It is a straggling shrub with wiry branches, egg-shaped to more or less heart-shaped leaves and yellow and red flowers.

== Description ==
Bossiaea cordigera is an erect or sprawling shrub that typically grows to a height of up to 1.5 m (4 ft 11 in) tall and has wiry branches. The leaves are arranged in opposite pairs, egg-shaped to slightly heart-shaped, 3–6 mm (0.12–0.24 in) long and 1.5–7 mm (0.059–0.276 in) wide on a thin petiole 1–2 mm (0.039–0.079 in) long with narrow triangular stipules 0.5–2 mm (0.020–0.079 in) long at the base. The flowers are borne singly in leaf axils, each flower 4–10 mm (0.16–0.39 in) long and borne on a thin pedicel 5–20 mm (0.20–0.79 in) long with a bracts and bracteoles up to 1 mm (0.039 in) long. The sepals are 3–5 mm (0.12–0.20 in) long and joined at the base with the upper lobes 2.5–3.5 mm (0.098–0.138 in) long and the lower lobes 1.0–1.7 mm (0.039–0.067 in) long. The standard petal is yellow with a red base, a darker colour on the back and up to 12 mm (0.47 in) long, the wings 3.0–3.5 mm (0.12–0.14 in) wide and brownish-red, and the keel red with a pale base and about 4 mm (0.16 in) wide. Flowering occurs from October to January and the fruit is a narrow oblong pod 15–28 mm (0.59–1.10 in) long.

== Taxonomy ==
Bossiaea cordigera was first formally described in 1856 by Joseph Dalton Hooker in The Botany of the Antarctic voyage of H.M. Discovery ships Erebus and Terror. III. Flora Tasmaniae, based on an unpublished description by George Bentham. The specific epithet (cordigera) means "heart-bearing".

== Distribution and habitat ==
Wiry bossiaea grows in open forest, often in moist places and occurs between Portland and Healesville in southern Victoria and in the north and east of Tasmania.
