= Bossiaea milesiae =

Scientific classification
- Kingdom: Plantae
- Clade: Tracheophytes
- Clade: Angiosperms
- Clade: Eudicots
- Clade: Rosids
- Order: Fabales
- Family: Fabaceae
- Subfamily: Faboideae
- Genus: Bossiaea
- Species: B. milesiae

Binomial name
- Bossiaea milesiae K.L.McDougall

Species of flowering plant

Bossiaea milesiae is a species of flowering plant in the family Fabaceae and is endemic to a restricted area of New South Wales. It is an erect shrub with flattened, winged cladodes, small, scale-like leaves, and pea-like yellow to apricot-coloured and red flowers.

== Description ==
Bossiaea milesiae is an erect shrub that typically grows up to 2.5 m (8 ft 2 in) high with flattened cladodes up to 10 mm (0.39 in) wide, and that forms rhizomes. The leaves are reduced to coppery-brown scales, 1.0–2.5 mm (0.039–0.098 in) long. The flowers are borne on pedicels 2–4 mm (0.079–0.157 in) long and have four to eight scales up to 1 mm (0.039 in) long at the base. The five sepals are 4.5–5.3 mm (0.18–0.21 in) long and joined at the base forming a tube with lobes 1.0–1.2 mm (0.039–0.047 in) long, the two upper lobes about 1.5 mm (0.059 in) wide and the lower three lobes about 1.0 mm (0.039 in) wide. There are also bracteoles that fall off before the flower opens. The standard petal is deep yellow to apricot with a red base and 9.5–11.0 mm (0.37–0.43 in) long, the wings yellow with a red base and 8.5–10 mm (0.33–0.39 in) wide, and the keel red with a paler base and 9–10 mm (0.35–0.39 in) long. Flowering occurs from August to September and the fruit is an oblong pod 27–35 mm (1.1–1.4 in) long.

== Taxonomy and naming ==
Bossiaea milesiae was first formally described in 2009 by Keith Leonard McDougall in the journal Telopea from specimens he collected near Brogo Dam in 2006. The specific epithet (milesiae) honours the botanist Jackie Miles.

== Distribution and habitat ==
This bossiaea grows in forest and woodland, sometimes in river beds, mostly in and near Wadbilliga National Park in south-eastern New South Wales.
