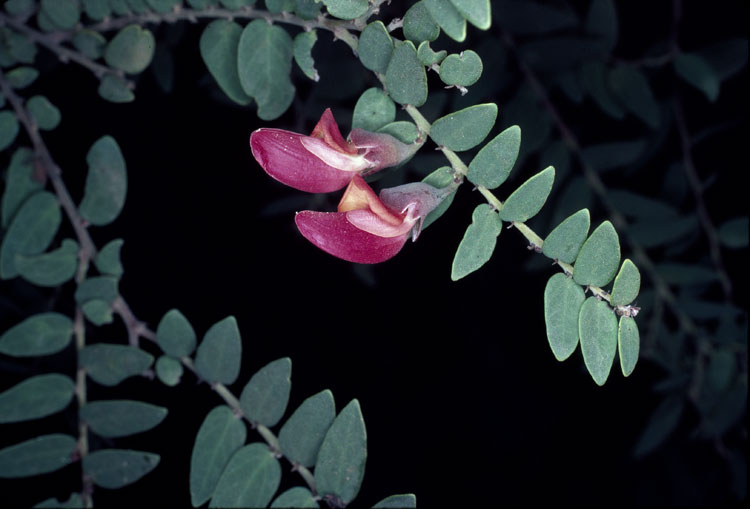
- On the Blackdown Tableland

Scientific classification
- Kingdom: Plantae
- Clade: Tracheophytes
- Clade: Angiosperms
- Clade: Eudicots
- Clade: Rosids
- Order: Fabales
- Family: Fabaceae
- Subfamily: Faboideae
- Genus: Bossiaea
- Species: B. carinalis

Binomial name
- Bossiaea carinalis Benth.

= Bossiaea carinalis =

Species of legume

Bossiaea carinalis is a species of flowering plant in the family Fabaceae and is endemic to eastern Queensland. It is an erect shrub with narrow egg-shaped to lance-shaped leaves and pink to red and yellow flowers.

== Description ==
Bossiaea carinalis is an erect shrub that typically grows to a height of up to 3 m (9.8 ft) and has hairy branchlets. The leaves are arranged alternately, narrow egg-shaped to lance-shaped, mostly 5–25 mm (0.20–0.98 in) long and 2–13 mm (0.079–0.512 in) wide on a petiole 0.5–1.0 mm (0.020–0.039 in) long with narrow triangular stipules 2–3 mm (0.079–0.118 in) long at the base. The flowers are borne on a pedicel 3–7 mm (0.12–0.28 in) long with a bract 1.0–1.5 mm (0.039–0.059 in) long and similarly sized bracteoles at the base. The sepals are 5–9 mm (0.20–0.35 in) long and joined at the base with the two upper lobes 3.0–3.5 mm (0.12–0.14 in) long and the lower lobes 1.5–2.5 mm (0.059–0.098 in) long. The standard petal is red with a yellow base and up to 12 mm (0.47 in) long, the wings yellow or red and slightly longer than the standard, and the keel pink to red and 5–10 mm (0.20–0.39 in) longer than the standard petal. Flowering occurs in most months but mainly from late winter to early spring and the fruit is an oblong pod 10–20 mm (0.39–0.79 in) long.

== Taxonomy ==
Bossiaea carinalis was first formally described in 1864 by George Bentham in Thomas Mitchell's Journal of an Expedition into the Interior of Tropical Australia.

== Distribution and habitat ==
This bossiaea grows in woodland and forest between Bundaberg and Townsville in eastern Queensland.

== Conservation status ==
Bossiaea carinalis is listed as of "least concern" under the Queensland Government Nature Conservation Act 1992.
