= Bossiaea obovata =

Scientific classification
- Kingdom: Plantae
- Clade: Tracheophytes
- Clade: Angiosperms
- Clade: Eudicots
- Clade: Rosids
- Order: Fabales
- Family: Fabaceae
- Subfamily: Faboideae
- Genus: Bossiaea
- Species: B. obovata

Binomial name
- Bossiaea obovata I.Thomps.

Species of flowering plant

Bossiaea obovata is a species of flowering plant in the family Fabaceae and is endemic to eastern Australia. It is a small, low-lying or prostrate shrub with egg-shaped leaves with the narrower end towards the base, and pea-shaped, yellow and red flowers.

== Description ==
Bossiaea obovata is a prostrate or low-lying shrub that typically grows up to 20 cm (7.9 in) high with wedge-shaped to egg-shaped leaves with the narrower end towards the base, 2–10 mm (0.079–0.394 in) long and 1–8 mm (0.039–0.315 in) wide on a petiole 0.5–1 mm (0.020–0.039 in) long. The flowers are arranged singly or in small group, each flower on a pedicel 2–5 mm (0.079–0.197 in) long with a leaf-like bract 1–1.5 mm (0.039–0.059 in) long at the base. The five sepals are 3–4.5 mm (0.12–0.18 in) long and joined at the base with the two upper lobes about 2–2.5 mm (0.079–0.098 in) long. There are bracteoles 1–2 mm (0.039–0.079 in) long but that often fall off as the flower opens. The standard petal is yellow with a red base and up to about 10 mm (0.39 in) long, the wings are yellow and 2.5–3 mm (0.098–0.118 in) wide, and the keel is pink or red and 2.5–3.0 mm (0.098–0.118 in) wide. Flowering occurs from October to December and the fruit is an oblong pod 12–18 mm (0.47–0.71 in) long.

== Taxonomy and naming ==
Bossiaea obovata was first formally described in 2012 by Ian R. Thompson in the journal Muelleria from specimens collected near Stanthorpe in 1984. The specific epithet (obovata) means egg-shaped with the widest part above the middle, referring to the shape of the leaves.

== Distribution and habitat ==
This bossiaea grows in open forest and woodland from the Stanthorpe district in Queensland to Werrikimbe National Park in north-eastern New South Wales.
