= Bossiaea aurantiaca =

Conservation status
- Priority One — Poorly Known Taxa (DEC)

Scientific classification
- Kingdom: Plantae
- Clade: Tracheophytes
- Clade: Angiosperms
- Clade: Eudicots
- Clade: Rosids
- Order: Fabales
- Family: Fabaceae
- Subfamily: Faboideae
- Genus: Bossiaea
- Species: B. aurantiaca

Binomial name
- Bossiaea aurantiaca J.H.Ross

Species of flowering plant

Bossiaea aurantiaca is a species of flowering plant in the family Fabaceae and is endemic to the south-west of Western Australia. It is a rounded or spreading, spiny shrub with oblong to narrow egg-shaped leaves, and golden-yellow and pinkish-red flowers.

== Description ==
Bossiaea aurantiaca is a rounded or spreading, spiny shrub that typically grows up to 1.5 m (4 ft 11 in) high and 2.2 m (7 ft 3 in) wide, the side-branches ending in a sharp point. The leaves are oblong to narrow egg-shaped with the narrower end towards the base, 3.3–7.3 mm (0.13–0.29 in) long and 0.8–1.4 mm (0.031–0.055 in) wide on a petiole 0.5–1.0 mm (0.020–0.039 in) long with a stipule 0.6–1.5 mm (0.024–0.059 in) long at the base. The flowers are arranged singly or in small groups, each flower on a pedicel 2–4 mm (0.079–0.157 in) long with a single bract. The sepals are green with reddish tips, joined at the base forming a tube 2.0–2.9 mm (0.079–0.114 in) long, the two upper lobes 1.0–1.8 mm (0.039–0.071 in) long and the lower three lobes 0.9–1.8 mm (0.035–0.071 in) long. The standard petal is golden yellow with a pinkish-red base and 8.3–9.3 mm (0.33–0.37 in) long, the wings 7.3–7.6 mm (0.29–0.30 in) long and the keel 6.3–6.9 mm (0.25–0.27 in) long and pinkish-red with a green base. Flowering occurs from September to October and the fruit is an oblong pod 14–15 mm (0.55–0.59 in) long.

== Taxonomy and naming ==
Bossiaea aurantiaca was first formally described in 2006 by James Henderson Ross in the journal Muelleria from specimens collected north-west of Norseman in 1998. The specific epithet (aurantiaca) means "of orange colour".

== Distribution and habitat ==
This bossiaea grows in mallee scrub in low-lying situations in the Coolgardie biogeographic region of south-western Western Australia, centred around Norseman.

== Conservation status ==
Bossiaea aurantiaca is classified as "Priority One" by the Government of Western Australia Department of Parks and Wildlife, meaning that it is known from only one or a few locations which are potentially at risk.
