= Bossiaea divaricata =

Conservation status
- Priority Four — Rare Taxa (DEC)

Scientific classification
- Kingdom: Plantae
- Clade: Tracheophytes
- Clade: Angiosperms
- Clade: Eudicots
- Clade: Rosids
- Order: Fabales
- Family: Fabaceae
- Subfamily: Faboideae
- Genus: Bossiaea
- Species: B. divaricata

Binomial name
- Bossiaea divaricata Turcz.

Species of flowering plant

Bossiaea divaricata is a species of flowering plant in the family Fabaceae and is endemic to the southwest of Western Australia. It is a low, dense, openly-branched shrub with oblong to egg-shaped leaves and deep yellow and dark red flowers.

== Description ==
Bossiaea divaricata is a dense, rigid, openly-branched shrub that typically grows up to 0.5 m (1 ft 8 in) high and 1 m (3 ft 3 in) wide, the short side branches ending in a sharp point. The leaves are arranged alternately, oblong to narrow egg-shaped, 8–18 mm (0.31–0.71 in) long and 2.5–6 mm (0.098–0.236 in) wide on a petiole 0.3–0.6 mm (0.012–0.024 in) long with egg-shaped stipules 2–4.5 mm (0.079–0.177 in) long at the base. The edges of the leaves curve downwards and the lower surface is hairy. The flowers are arranged singly in leaf axils, each flower on a pedicel 2.5–4.0 mm (0.098–0.157 in) long with overlapping egg-shaped bracts up to 3 mm (0.12 in) long attached. The five sepals are joined at the base with lobes 2.3–3.7 mm (0.091–0.146 in) long. There are bracteoles 2.8–3.5 mm (0.11–0.14 in) long at the base of the sepal tube. The standard petal is deep yellow with a reddish base and 8–11 mm (0.31–0.43 in) long, the wings pink to red with a yellow tip and 7.0–9.5 mm (0.28–0.37 in) long, the keel dark red with a pinkish base and 7.4–9.5 mm (0.29–0.37 in) long. The fruit is a dark brown pod 11–20 mm (0.43–0.79 in) long.

== Taxonomy and naming ==
Bossiaea divaricata was first formally described in 1853 by Nikolai Turczaninow in the Bulletin de la Société Impériale des Naturalistes de Moscou. The specific epithet (divaricata) means "widely spreading", referring to the branching habit.

== Distribution and habitat ==
This bossiaea grows in mallee and woodland in disturbed sites in the Avon Wheatbelt, Esperance Plains and Mallee biogeographic regions of south-western Western Australia.

== Conservation status ==
Bossiaea divaricata is classified as "Priority Four" by the Government of Western Australia Department of Parks and Wildlife, meaning that is rare or near threatened.
