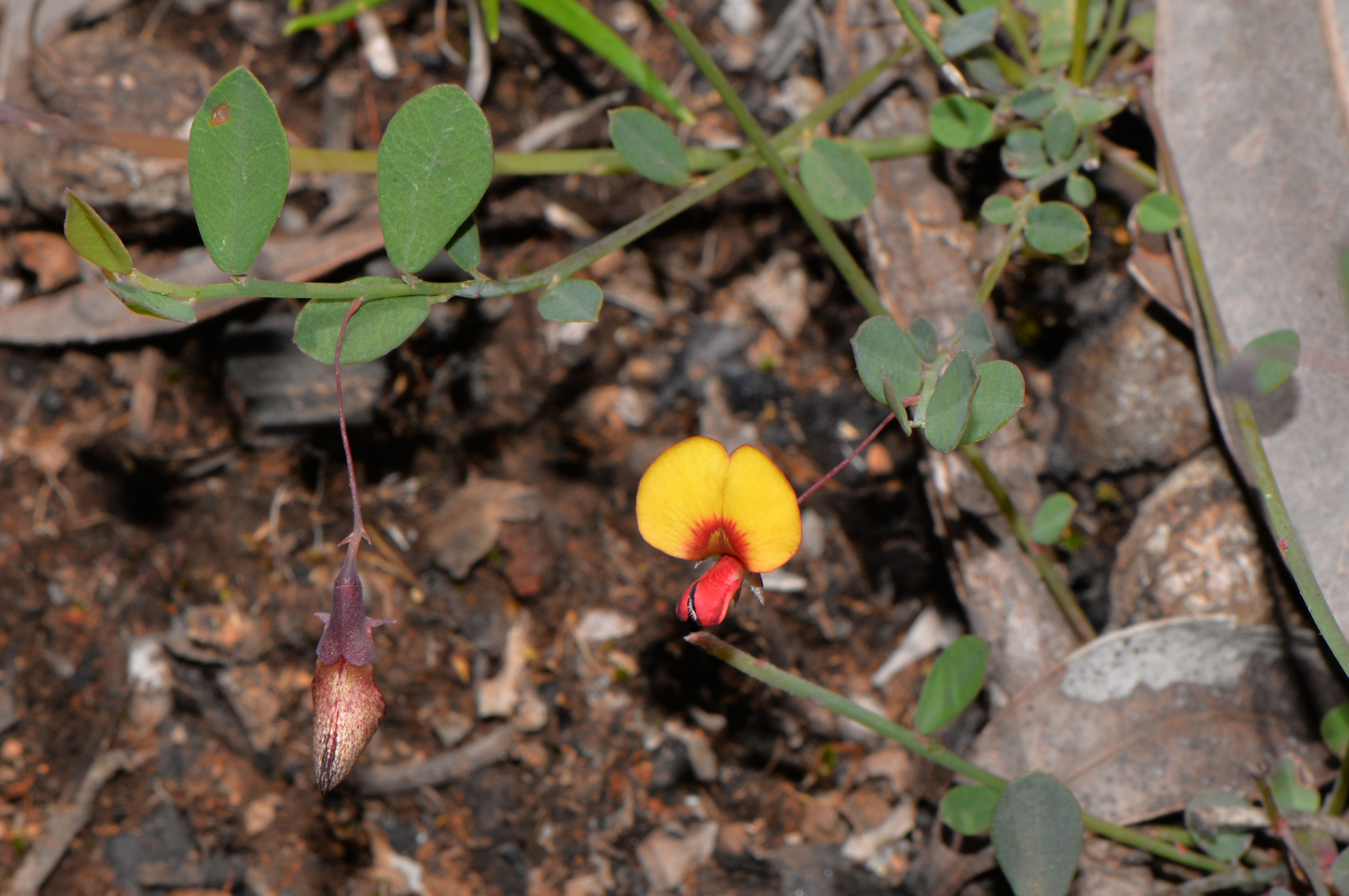

Conservation status
- Priority Two — Poorly Known Taxa (DEC)

Scientific classification
- Kingdom: Plantae
- Clade: Tracheophytes
- Clade: Angiosperms
- Clade: Eudicots
- Clade: Rosids
- Order: Fabales
- Family: Fabaceae
- Subfamily: Faboideae
- Genus: Bossiaea
- Species: B. modesta

Binomial name
- Bossiaea modesta J.H.Ross

= Bossiaea modesta =

Species of legume

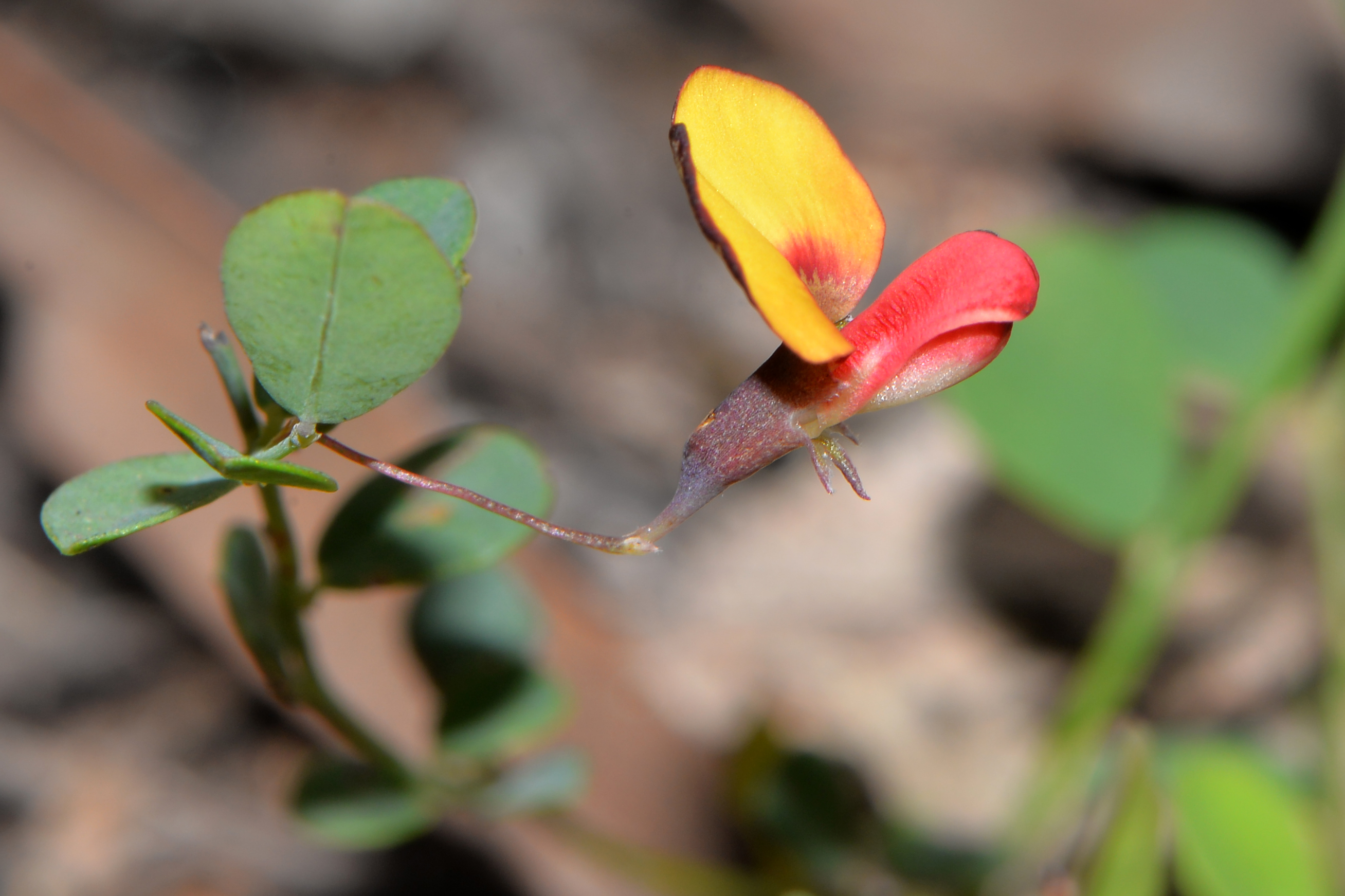
Flower detail

Bossiaea modesta is a species of flowering plant in the family Fabaceae and is endemic to the ranges east of Perth in Western Australia. It is a sub-shrub with wiry, trailing to twining stems, linear to elliptic or oblong leaves, and small yellow and red flowers.

== Description ==
Bossiaea modesta is a sub-shrub that typically grows to a height of up to 50 cm (20 in) when supported by other plants, and has wiry, trailing and twining stems. The leaves are linear to elliptic or oblong, 9–28 mm (0.35–1.10 in) long and 2.5–6 mm (0.098–0.236 in) wide with tapering stipules 0.5–1.6 mm (0.020–0.063 in) long and shorter than the petiole. The flowers are arranged singly, each flower on a thread-like pedicel 12–25 mm (0.47–0.98 in) long. There is a single oblong bract 0.9–1.8 mm (0.035–0.071 in) long but that falls off at the bud stage. The five sepals are joined at the base forming a tube 2.8–3.5 mm (0.11–0.14 in) long the two upper lobes 1.2–1.9 mm (0.047–0.075 in) long and the lower lobes 1.5–1.7 mm (0.059–0.067 in) long, with oblong bracteoles 0.8–1.6 mm (0.031–0.063 in) long just below the base of the sepal tube. The standard petal is deep yellow with a red base and 9.8–10.0 mm (0.39–0.39 in) long, the wings 7.6–8 mm (0.30–0.31 in) long, and the keel is red and 8.0–8.3 mm (0.31–0.33 in) long. Flowering occurs from October to December.

== Taxonomy and naming ==
Bossiaea modesta was first formally described in 1994 by James Henderson Ross in the journal Muelleria from specimens collected by Margaret Corrick in the Mount Dale area in 1983. The specific epithet (modesta) means "modest" or "unassuming".

== Distribution and habitat ==
This bossiaea grows in damp places near Mount Dale and on the Darling Range to the east and south east of Perth in the Jarrah Forest and Swan Coastal Plain biogeographic regions.

== Conservation status ==
Bossiaea modesta is classified as "Priority Two" by the Western Australian Government Department of Parks and Wildlife, meaning that it is poorly known and from only one or a few locations.
