= Bossiaea nummularia =

Scientific classification
- Kingdom: Plantae
- Clade: Tracheophytes
- Clade: Angiosperms
- Clade: Eudicots
- Clade: Rosids
- Order: Fabales
- Family: Fabaceae
- Subfamily: Faboideae
- Genus: Bossiaea
- Species: B. nummularia

Binomial name
- Bossiaea nummularia Endl.

Species of legume

Bossiaea nummularia is a species of flowering plant in the family Fabaceae and is endemic to New South Wales. It is a prostrate to low-lying sub-shrub with moderately hairy foliage, mostly broadly elliptic leaves, and yellow and red flowers.

== Description ==
Bossiaea nummularia is a prostrate to low-lying sub-shrub that typically grows up to 20 cm (7.9 in) high, and has moderately hairy foliage. The leaves are usually broadly elliptic, 2–12 mm (0.079–0.472 in) long and 2–6 mm (0.079–0.236 in) wide on a petiole 0.5–1.0 mm (0.020–0.039 in) long with narrow triangular stipules 1.0–2.5 mm (0.039–0.098 in) long at the base. The flowers are borne singly or in pairs, each flower on a pedicel 3–15 mm (0.12–0.59 in) long with bracts 1.0–1.5 mm (0.039–0.059 in) long at the base. The five sepals are 3.5–4.5 mm (0.14–0.18 in) long and joined at the base forming a tube, the upper lobes 1.5–2 mm (0.059–0.079 in) wide, the lower lobes about 0.8 mm (0.031 in) wide. There are bracteoles 1–2 mm (0.039–0.079 in) long near the middle of the pedicel. The standard petal is yellow with a red base and up to 9 mm (0.35 in) long, the wings mostly brownish red, and the keel red and paler near the tip. Flowering occurs from August to October and the fruit is a narrow oblong pod 20–30 mm (0.79–1.18 in) long.

== Taxonomy and naming ==
Bossiaea nummularia was first formally described in 1839 by Stephan Endlicher in Novarum Stirpium Decades from specimens grown in the garden of Charles von Hügel.

== Distribution and habitat ==
This bossiaea grows in woodland and open forest, mostly in the Sydney region and in areas south of Goulburn.
