= Bossiaea saxosa =

Conservation status
- Priority One — Poorly Known Taxa (DEC)

Scientific classification
- Kingdom: Plantae
- Clade: Tracheophytes
- Clade: Angiosperms
- Clade: Eudicots
- Clade: Rosids
- Order: Fabales
- Family: Fabaceae
- Subfamily: Faboideae
- Genus: Bossiaea
- Species: B. saxosa

Binomial name
- Bossiaea saxosa J.H.Ross

Species of legume

Bossiaea saxosa is a species of flowering plant in the family Fabaceae and is endemic to a restricted area near Norseman, Western Australia. It is an erect, intricately branched shrub with many slightly flattened, sharply pointed cladodes and deep yellow, red and lemon-yellow, pea-like flowers.

== Description ==
Bossiaea saxosa is an erect, intricately branched shrub that typically grows up to 1.5 m (4 ft 11 in) high and wide with hairy young growth. The branches are slightly flattened, ending in sharply pointed cladodes 1–2 mm (0.039–0.079 in) wide. The leaves, when present, are reduced to dark, reddish-brown scales 0.7–1 mm (0.028–0.039 in) long. The flowers are arranged singly at nodes along the cladodes, each flower on a hairy pedicel up to 5 mm (0.20 in) long with egg-shaped bracts up to 1 mm (0.039 in) long at the base and egg-shaped bracteoles 0.8–1.3 mm (0.031–0.051 in) long on the pedicels. The five sepals are hairy and joined at the base, forming a tube 1.6–3.5 mm (0.063–0.138 in) long, the two upper lobes 1.6–3.0 mm (0.063–0.118 in) long and the lower lobes 1.2–2.0 mm (0.047–0.079 in) long. The standard petal is deep yellow with a red base and 7.2–9.6 mm (0.28–0.38 in) long, the wings deep yellow and 6.6–8.2 mm (0.26–0.32 in) long, and the keel lemon-yellow and 3.5–4.5 mm (0.14–0.18 in) long. Flowering occurs from September to early October and the fruit is an oblong pod 13–21 mm (0.51–0.83 in) long.

== Taxonomy and naming ==
Bossiaea saxosa was first formally described in 1994 by James Henderson Ross in the journal Muelleria from specimens he collected near Norseman in 2000. The specific epithet (saxosa) means "of rocky or stony places".

== Distribution and habitat ==
This bossiaea is only known from a small area north of Norseman where it grows in woodland.

== Conservation status ==
Bossiaea saxosa is classified as "Priority One" by the Government of Western Australia Department of Biodiversity, Conservation and Attractions, meaning that it is known from only one or a few locations which are potentially at risk.
