= Bossiaea peduncularis =

Scientific classification
- Kingdom: Plantae
- Clade: Tracheophytes
- Clade: Angiosperms
- Clade: Eudicots
- Clade: Rosids
- Order: Fabales
- Family: Fabaceae
- Subfamily: Faboideae
- Genus: Bossiaea
- Species: B. peduncularis

Binomial name
- Bossiaea peduncularis Turcz.

Species of legume

Bossiaea peduncularis is a species of flowering plant in the family Fabaceae and is endemic to Western Australia. It is an erect, more or less leafless shrub with arching branches, cladodes ending with a point and deep yellow, red and greenish-yellow flowers.

== Description ==
Bossiaea peduncularis is an erect, glabrous, more or less leafless shrub that typically grows to 0.5–1.5 m (1 ft 8 in – 4 ft 11 in) high, 2 m (6 ft 7 in) wide and often has arched branches. The ends of the cladodes are 0.7–1.0 mm (0.028–0.039 in) wide ending in a point. When present, the leaves are oblong, 3.6–10.5 mm (0.14–0.41 in) long, but are soon shed. The flowers are arranged singly in nodes on a pedicel 5.5–13 mm (0.22–0.51 in) long with a single egg-shaped bract 0.4–1.2 mm (0.016–0.047 in) long at the base and bracteoles near the middle of the pedicels, but the bract and bracteoles fall off at the bud stage. The sepals are joined at the base forming a tube 3.5–4.6 mm (0.14–0.18 in) long, the lobes 1.3–2.1 mm (0.051–0.083 in) long. The standard petal is deep yellow with a red base, 10.5–13.0 mm (0.41–0.51 in) long, the wings are 9.2–10.8 mm (0.36–0.43 in) long and the keel pale greenish yellow and about the same length as the wings. Flowering occurs from July to August and the fruit is an oblong pod 15–17 mm (0.59–0.67 in) long.

== Taxonomy and naming ==
Bossiaea peduncularis was first formally described in 1853 by Nikolai Turczaninow in the Bulletin de la Société impériale des naturalistes de Moscou from specimens collected by James Drummond. The specific epithet (peduncularis) means "pedunculate".

== Distribution and habitat ==
This bossiaea is found in the Esperance Plains and Mallee biogeographic regions, where it grows on the edges of salt lakes and on hills and sand dunes.

== Conservation status ==
Bossiaea peduncularis is classified as "not threatened" by the Government of Western Australia Department of Parks and Wildlife.
