= Bossiaea concinna =

Conservation status
- Priority Three — Poorly Known Taxa (DEC)

Scientific classification
- Kingdom: Plantae
- Clade: Tracheophytes
- Clade: Angiosperms
- Clade: Eudicots
- Clade: Rosids
- Order: Fabales
- Family: Fabaceae
- Subfamily: Faboideae
- Genus: Bossiaea
- Species: B. concinna

Binomial name
- Bossiaea concinna Benth.

Species of legume

Bossiaea concinna is a species of flowering plant in the pea family Fabaceae and is endemic to the south-west of Western Australia. It is an erect, spiny, more or less glabrous shrub with oblong leaves and bright yellow and red flowers.

== Description ==
Bossiaea concinna is an erect, compact shrub that typically grows up to 1.5 m (4 ft 11 in) high and 2.0 m (6 ft 7 in) wide and is more or less glabrous with short side shoots ending in a sharp point. The leaves are arranged alternately and are oblong, 1.8–6.5 mm (0.071–0.256 in) long and 1.0–1.3 mm (0.039–0.051 in) wide on a petiole 0.4–0.8 mm (0.016–0.031 in) long with narrow egg-shaped stipules 0.5–0.9 mm (0.020–0.035 in) long at the base. The flowers are borne singly or in small groups on a pedicel 3.5–11 mm (0.14–0.43 in) long with a single bract 0.6–1.3 mm (0.024–0.051 in) long. The five sepals are joined at the base forming a tube 2.0–3.5 mm (0.079–0.138 in) long, the two upper lobes 0.8–1.8 mm (0.031–0.071 in) long and the lower lobes slightly shorter. The standard petal is 8.0–9.2 mm (0.31–0.36 in) long, bright yellow with a pinkish-red base, the wings red and 5.8–7.4 mm (0.23–0.29 in) long, and the keel 7.0–7.4 mm (0.28–0.29 in) long and dark pinkish-red. Flowering occurs from June to September and the fruit is a pod 10–16 mm (0.39–0.63 in) long.

== Taxonomy and naming ==
Bossiaea concinna was first described in 1864 by George Bentham in his book Flora Australiensis from specimens collected by James Drummond. The specific epithet (concinna) mean "neat", "pretty" or "elegant".

== Distribution and habitat ==
The species of bossiaea grows in sandy soils above the samphire zone usually within sight of a salt lake. It occurs in scattered populations in the Avon Wheatbelt, Coolgardie, Jarrah Forest and Mallee biogeographic regions of south-western Western Australia.

== Conservation status ==
Bossiaea concinna is classified as "Priority Three" by the Government of Western Australia Department of Parks and Wildlife meaning that it is poorly known and known from only a few locations but is not under imminent threat.
