= Bossiaea arcuata =

Conservation status
- Priority One — Poorly Known Taxa (DEC)

Scientific classification
- Kingdom: Plantae
- Clade: Tracheophytes
- Clade: Angiosperms
- Clade: Eudicots
- Clade: Rosids
- Order: Fabales
- Family: Fabaceae
- Subfamily: Faboideae
- Genus: Bossiaea
- Species: B. arcuata

Binomial name
- Bossiaea arcuata J.H.Ross

Species of flowering plant

Bossiaea arcuata is a species of flowering plant in the family Fabaceae and is endemic to a small area in Western Australia. It is an erect, openly-branched, more or less leafless shrub with often arched cladodes, and yellow and red pea-like flowers.

== Description ==
Bossiaea arcuata is an erect, openly-branched shrub that typically grows to 1.5 m (4 ft 11 in) high and 2 m (6 ft 7 in) wide. The leaves are oblong to lance-shaped, 3.6–10.5 mm (0.14–0.41 in) long and 1.3–3.0 mm (0.051–0.118 in) wide on a petiole 0.5–1.5 mm (0.020–0.059 in) long but are only present on the youngest growth and soon fall from the plant. The ends of the branches function as cladodes 0.7–1.0 mm (0.028–0.039 in) wide, are pinkish when young, and have a weak point on the tip. The flowers are arranged singly on a pedicel 5.5–13 mm (0.22–0.51 in) long with a single bract that falls from the flower bud. The sepals are joined at the base forming a tube 3.5–4.6 mm (0.14–0.18 in) long, the two upper lobes 1.3–2.1 mm (0.051–0.083 in) long and the lower three lobes 1.4–1.9 mm (0.055–0.075 in) long. The standard petal is bright yellow with red markings and 10.5–13.0 mm (0.41–0.51 in) long, the wings yellow with a red base and the keel pale greenish yellow. Flowering occurs from March to April or from September to October and the fruit is an oblong pod 14–21 mm (0.55–0.83 in) long.

This bossiaea is superficially similar to B. halophila but differs in having a more open habit, a few inconspicuous leaves, and cladodes that are round or oval in cross-section, rather than winged. It also resembles B. peduncularis but differs from it in having a different habit, different branching pattern, glabrous branches, leaves and sepals, and larger flowers.

== Taxonomy and naming ==
Bossiaea arcuata was first formally described in 2006 by James Henderson Ross in the journal Muelleria from specimens collected south of Norseman in 2000. The specific epithet (arcuata) means "curved like a bow" referring to the shape of the cladodes.

== Distribution and habitat ==
This bossiaea is only known from the Picnic Lake area south of Norseman in Western Australia, where it grows in deep sand on the edge of the salt lake.

== Conservation status ==
Bossiaea arcuata is classified as "Priority One" by the Government of Western Australia Department of Parks and Wildlife, meaning that it is known from only one or a few locations which are potentially at risk.
