= Bossiaea simulata =

Conservation status
- Priority Two — Poorly Known Taxa (DEC)

Scientific classification
- Kingdom: Plantae
- Clade: Tracheophytes
- Clade: Angiosperms
- Clade: Eudicots
- Clade: Rosids
- Order: Fabales
- Family: Fabaceae
- Subfamily: Faboideae
- Genus: Bossiaea
- Species: B. simulata

Binomial name
- Bossiaea simulata J.H.Ross

Species of legume

Bossiaea simulata is a species of flowering plant in the family Fabaceae and is endemic to inland areas of Western Australia. It is a compact shrub with sharply-pointed cladodes and yellow, pea-like flowers sometimes with red markings.

== Description ==
Bossiaea simulata is a compact shrub that typically grows up to 0.9 m (2 ft 11 in) high and 1 m (3 ft 3 in) wide with many stems at the base. The branches are flattened and end in sharply pointed cladodes 1.5–3.0 mm (0.059–0.118 in) wide. The leaves, when present, are reduced to egg-shaped scales 0.6–1.2 mm (0.024–0.047 in) long. The flowers are arranged singly, in pairs or threes at nodes along the cladodes, each flower on a hairy pedicel 1.8–4.6 mm (0.071–0.181 in) long with egg-shaped bracts up to 1.2 mm (0.047 in) long and wide at the base and narrow egg-shaped, reddish-brown bracteoles 0.9–2.0 mm (0.035–0.079 in) long on the pedicels. The five sepals are hairy and joined at the base, forming a tube 1.7–2.9 mm (0.067–0.114 in) long, the two upper lobes 0.8–1.5 mm (0.031–0.059 in) long and the lower lobes slightly shorter. The standard petal is golden yellow, sometimes with a red base, and 7.5–10.1 mm (0.30–0.40 in) long, the wings 6.8–9.5 mm (0.27–0.37 in) long, and the keel pale greenish-yellow and 6.7–8.8 mm (0.26–0.35 in) long. Flowering occurs from October to December and the fruit is an oblong pod 12–19 mm (0.47–0.75 in) long.

== Taxonomy and naming ==
Bossiaea simulata was first formally described in 1994 by James Henderson Ross in the journal Muelleria from specimens collected near Mount Willgonarinya in 1997. The specific epithet (simulata) means "imitating" or "resembling", referring to the superficial resemblance of this species to Bossiaea celata.

== Distribution and habitat ==
This bossiaea grows in low Eucalyptus woodland from Mount Malcolm near Leonora to Mount Willgonarinya, in the Coolgardie and Mallee biogeographic regions of inland Western Australia.

== Conservation status ==
Bossiaea simulata is classified as "Priority Two" by the Western Australian Government Department of Biodiversity, Conservation and Attractions, meaning that it is poorly known and from only one or a few locations.
