= Bossiaea flexuosa =

Conservation status
- Priority Three — Poorly Known Taxa (DEC)

Scientific classification
- Kingdom: Plantae
- Clade: Tracheophytes
- Clade: Angiosperms
- Clade: Eudicots
- Clade: Rosids
- Order: Fabales
- Family: Fabaceae
- Subfamily: Faboideae
- Genus: Bossiaea
- Species: B. flexuosa

Binomial name
- Bossiaea flexuosa J.H.Ross

Species of flowering plant

Bossiaea flexuosa is a species of flowering plant in the family Fabaceae and is endemic to Western Australia. It is a compact shrub with slightly flattened, zigzag branches, notched, more or less leafless cladodes, and golden yellow and red or pinkish flowers.

== Description ==
Bossiaea flexuosa is a compact shrub that typically grows up to 0.6 m (2 ft 0 in) high and 1.5 m (4 ft 11 in) wide with zigzag branches that are slightly flattened to oval in cross-section, and notched cladodes 1–3 mm (0.039–0.118 in) wide. The leaves are reduced to broadly egg-shaped scales 0.8–1.4 mm (0.031–0.055 in) long and 0.9–1.4 mm (0.035–0.055 in) wide, reddish at first then turning black. The flowers are arranged singly, in pairs or threes, each flower on a pedicel 2.5–4.5 mm (0.098–0.177 in) long with overlapping, egg-shaped bracts up to 1.1 mm (0.043 in) long. The sepals are joined at the base forming a tube 2.0–4.5 mm (0.079–0.177 in) long, with five lobes, the two upper lobes 1.0–2.7 mm (0.039–0.106 in) long and the three lower lobes 0.8–1.7 mm (0.031–0.067 in) long, with egg-shaped bracteoles 0.9–2.0 mm (0.035–0.079 in) long on the pedicel. The standard petal is golden yellow with a pinkish-red base and 8.5–12.5 mm (0.33–0.49 in) long, the wings 7.5–11.5 mm (0.30–0.45 in) long and the keel is deep purplish-red with a greenish-yellow base and 7.7–11.0 mm (0.30–0.43 in) long. Flowering occurs from September to November and the fruit is an oblong pod 10–16 mm (0.39–0.63 in) long.

== Taxonomy and naming ==
Bossiaea flexuosa was first formally described in 2006 by James Henderson Ross in the journal Muelleria from specimens collected south-west of Salmon Gums in 1998. The specific epithet (flexuosa) means "zigzag", referring to the shape of the young stems.

== Distribution and habitat ==
This bossiaea grows in deep sand in kwongan, open mallee or woodland mostly between Norseman, Hyden and Salmon Gums in the Coolgardie, Esperance Plains and Mallee biogeographic regions of Western Australia.

== Conservation status ==
Bossiaea flexuosa is classified as "Priority Three" by the Government of Western Australia Department of Parks and Wildlife meaning that it is poorly known and known from only a few locations but is not under imminent threat.
