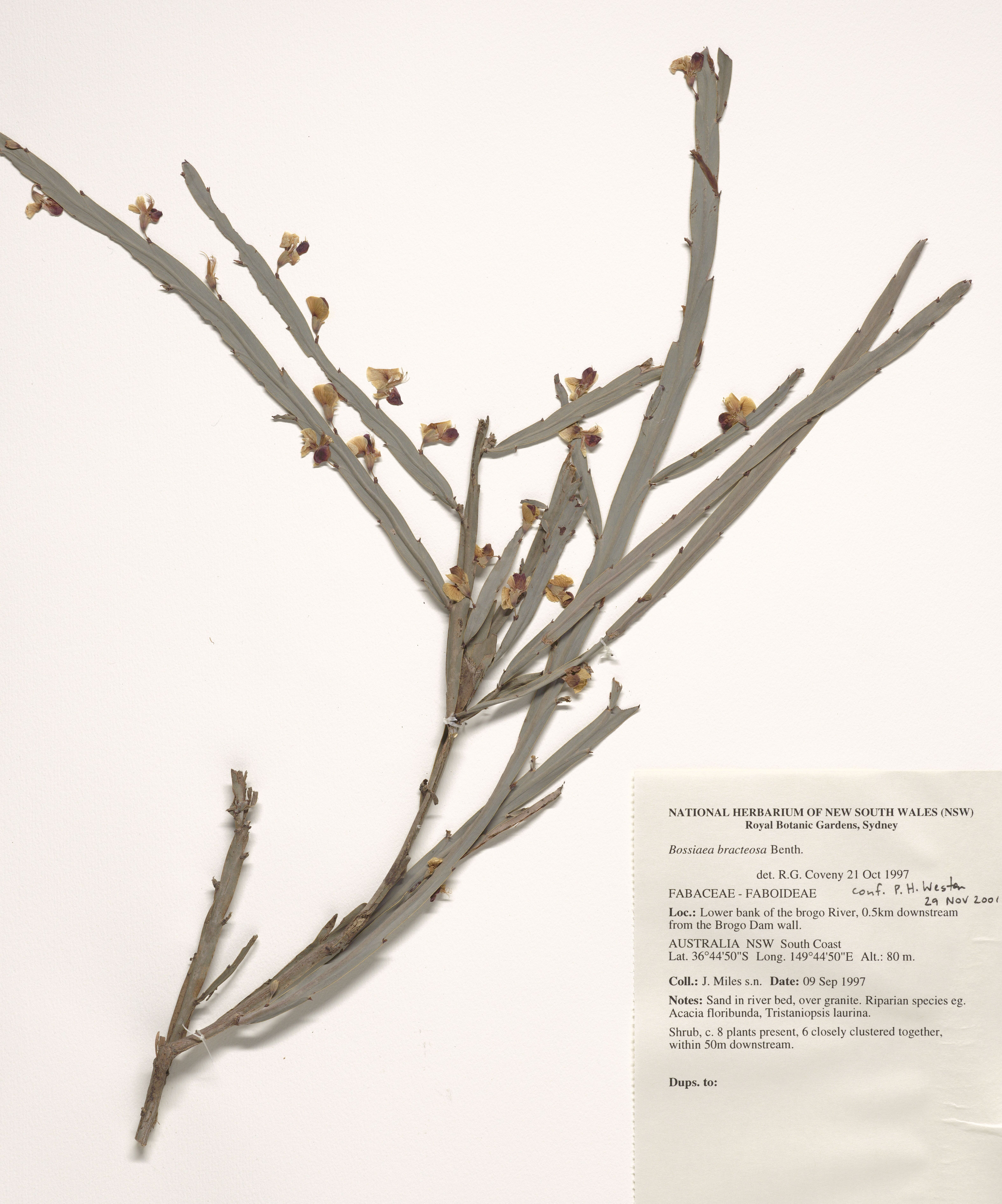
- Specimen held at the National Herbarium of New South Wales.

Scientific classification
- Kingdom: Plantae
- Clade: Tracheophytes
- Clade: Angiosperms
- Clade: Eudicots
- Clade: Rosids
- Order: Fabales
- Family: Fabaceae
- Subfamily: Faboideae
- Genus: Bossiaea
- Species: B. bracteosa

Binomial name
- Bossiaea bracteosa F.Muell. ex Benth.

= Bossiaea bracteosa =

Species of legume

Bossiaea bracteosa, commonly known as mountain leafless bossiaea, is a species of flowering plant in the family Fabaceae and is endemic to north-eastern Victoria, Australia. It is a dense shrub that often forms root suckers and has winged branches, winged and lobed cladodes, leaves reduced to small scales, and deep yellow flowers, often with red blotches.

== Description ==
Bossiaea bracteosa is a dense, erect to spreading shrub that typically grows to a height of 0.7–2 m (2 ft 4 in – 6 ft 7 in) and often forms root suckers. The branches are flattened and winged, with cladodes 5–14 mm (0.20–0.55 in) wide with lobed edges. The leaves are reduced to broadly egg-shaped scales, 2.7–5.0 mm (0.11–0.20 in) long. The flowers are arranged singly, each flower on a pedicel 1.5–2 mm (0.059–0.079 in) long with overlapping bracts up to about 2.5 mm (0.098 in) long and bracteoles that fall off as the flower buds develop. The sepals are 4.5–5.5 mm (0.18–0.22 in) long and joined at the base with five more or less similar lobes 1.4–2 mm (0.055–0.079 in) long. The standard petal is bright yellow with faint red marks, and 8.5–10 mm (0.33–0.39 in) long, the wings and 7.5–9.5 mm (0.30–0.37 in) long and the keel dark red and 7.5–9.5 mm (0.30–0.37 in) long. Flowering occurs from November to December and the fruit is an oblong pod 23–32 mm (0.91–1.26 in) long.

== Taxonomy and naming ==
Bossiaea bracteosa was first formally described in 1864 by George Bentham in Flora Australiensis from an unpublished description by Ferdinand von Mueller from specimens he collected in the Australian Alps. The specific epithet (bracteosa) means "having many bracts.

There are five recently described species that were previously included in a wider circumscription of Bossiaea bracteosa:

- Bossiaea bombayensis, on the Shoalhaven River near Braidwood, New South Wales
- Bossiaea fragrans, Abercrombie Caves, New South Wales
- Bossiaea grayi, Australian Capital Territory
- Bossiaea milesiae, near the Brogo Dam, New South Wales
- Bossiaea vombata, Wombat State Forest, Victoria

== Distribution and habitat ==
This bossiaea grows in shallow soil in snowgum woodland at altitudes between 1,000 and 1,600 m (3,300 and 5,200 ft) in north-eastern Victoria, where it is classed as "rare", although common in some populations.
