= Bossiaea halophila =

Scientific classification
- Kingdom: Plantae
- Clade: Tracheophytes
- Clade: Angiosperms
- Clade: Eudicots
- Clade: Rosids
- Order: Fabales
- Family: Fabaceae
- Subfamily: Faboideae
- Genus: Bossiaea
- Species: B. halophila

Binomial name
- Bossiaea halophila J.H.Ross
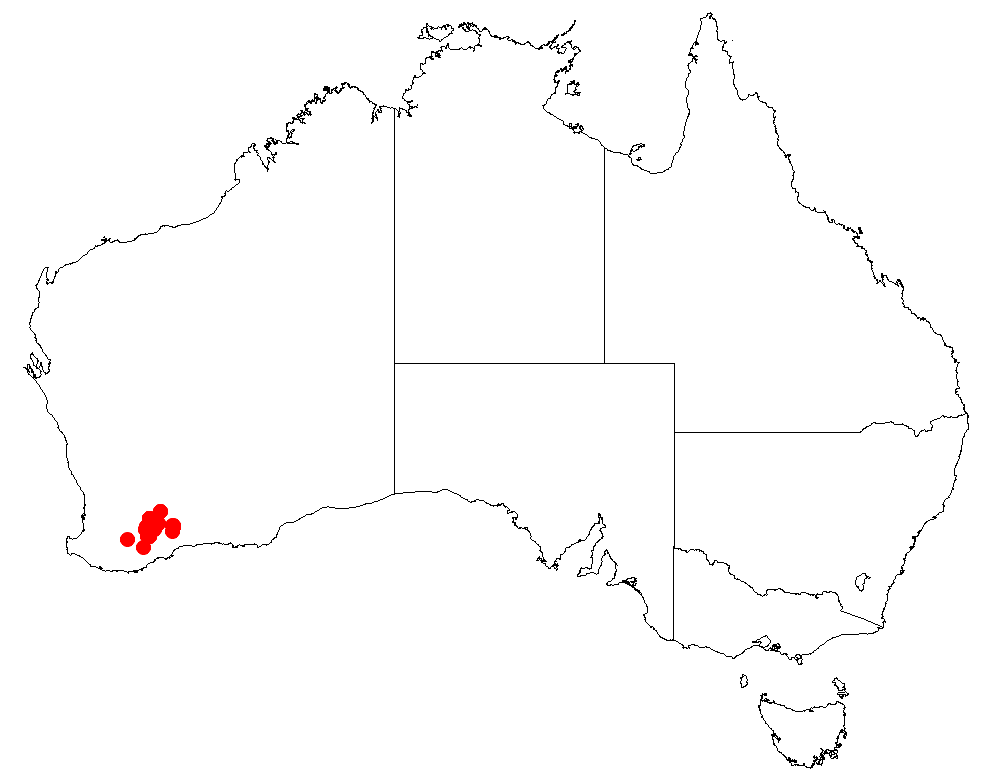
- Occurrence data from AVH

Species of legume

Bossiaea halophila is a species of flowering plant in the family Fabaceae and is endemic to Western Australia. It is a dense, erect, many-branched shrub with narrow-winged cladodes, leaves reduced to small scales, and yellow-orange and deep red flowers.

== Description ==
Bossiaea halophila is a dense, erect, many-branched shrub that typically grows up to 0.5–1.6 m (1 ft 8 in – 5 ft 3 in) high and 3 m (9.8 ft) wide with more or less glabrous foliage. The branches are sometimes flattened with winged cladodes, the narrowest 2–5 mm (0.079–0.197 in) wide. The leaves are reduced to scales about 2 mm (0.079 in) long. The flowers are usually arranged singly, each flower on a pedicel up to 5 mm (0.20 in) long with several, broadly egg-shaped bracts up to 1 mm (0.039 in) long. The five sepals are joined at the base forming a tube 3–3.5 mm (0.12–0.14 in) long, the two upper lobes 10.5–14.4 mm (0.41–0.57 in) long and the three lower lobes 1.5–2.4 mm (0.059–0.094 in) long, with a broadly egg-shaped bracteole up to 1 mm (0.039 in) long on the pedicel. The standard petal is deep yellow or orange yellow and 12.5–14.4 mm (0.49–0.57 in) long, the wings are about the same length as the standard, and the keel is deep red and 22.8–26 mm (0.90–1.02 in) long. Flowering occurs in October and the fruit is an oblong pod 25–48 mm (0.98–1.89 in) long.

== Taxonomy and naming ==
Bossiaea halophila was first formally described in 1998 by James Henderson Ross in the journal Muelleria from specimens collected at the start of the causeway on the western side of Lake King in 1996. The specific epithet (halophila) means "salt-loving", referring to the preferred habitat of this species.

== Distribution and habitat ==
This bossiaea grows in deep sand around the edge of salt lakes, often with mallee eucalypts and sometimes with Bossiaea cucullata. It occurs from near Pingaring to Hyden and Pingrup with an outlier near Lake King, in the Avon Wheatbelt and Mallee biogeographic regions of south-western Western Australia.

== Conservation status ==
Bossiaea halophila is classified as "not threatened" by the Government of Western Australia Department of Parks and Wildlife.
