= Bossiaea vombata =

Scientific classification
- Kingdom: Plantae
- Clade: Tracheophytes
- Clade: Angiosperms
- Clade: Eudicots
- Clade: Rosids
- Order: Fabales
- Family: Fabaceae
- Subfamily: Faboideae
- Genus: Bossiaea
- Species: B. vombata

Binomial name
- Bossiaea vombata J.H.Ross

Synonyms
- Bossiaea sp. aff. bracteosa (Wombat Forest)

Species of legume

Bossiaea vombata, commonly known as wombat bossiaea, is a species of flowering plant in the family Fabaceae and is endemic to the Wombat State Forest in Victoria, Australia. It is an erect shrub with flattened cladodes and yellow, pea-like flowers.

== Description ==
Bossiaea vombata is a more or less glabrous, rhizome-forming shrub that typically grows to a height of up to 1.2 m (3 ft 11 in). The branches are flattened and winged, ending in greyish-green cladodes 2–10 mm (0.079–0.394 in) wide. The leaves are reduced to scales 2–4 mm (0.079–0.157 in) long and up to 2 mm (0.079 in) wide. The flowers are 7–10 mm (0.28–0.39 in) long and arranged singly on a pedicel 1.0–2.5 mm (0.039–0.098 in) long with broadly egg-shaped bracts up to 3.1 mm (0.12 in) long and egg-shaped, brown bracteoles 2.8–3.7 mm (0.11–0.15 in) long but that fall off as the flower opens. The five sepals are glabrous and joined at the base, forming a tube 2.4–3.3 mm (0.094–0.130 in) long, the two upper lobes 1.7–2.2 mm (0.067–0.087 in) long and the lower lobes slightly shorter. The standard petal is uniformly yellow, 2.5–2.8 mm (0.098–0.110 in) long and 8.8–9.2 mm (0.35–0.36 in) wide, the wings yellow and 9.0–9.7 mm (0.35–0.38 in) long, and the keel yellowish-white and 9.0–9.8 mm (0.35–0.39 in) long. Flowering occurs in October and fruit is rarely produced.

== Taxonomy ==
Bossiaea vombata was first formally described in 2008 by James Henderson Ross in the journal Muelleria from specimens he collected in the Wombat State Forest in 1995. The specific epithet (vombata) refers to the name of the state forest where this species is endemic.

== Distribution and habitat ==
Wombat bossiaea is only known from the Wombat State Forest near Daylesford where it grows in open forest.

== Conservation status ==
This bossiaea is classified as "endangered" under the Victorian Government Flora and Fauna Guarantee Act 1988.
