= Bossiaea barrettiorum =

Conservation status
- Priority Two — Poorly Known Taxa (DEC)

Scientific classification
- Kingdom: Plantae
- Clade: Tracheophytes
- Clade: Angiosperms
- Clade: Eudicots
- Clade: Rosids
- Order: Fabales
- Family: Fabaceae
- Subfamily: Faboideae
- Genus: Bossiaea
- Species: B. barrettiorum

Binomial name
- Bossiaea barrettiorum J.H.Ross

Species of flowering plant

Bossiaea barrettiorum is a species of flowering plant in the family Fabaceae and is endemic to a restricted area in the Northern Kimberley region of Western Australia. It is low, spreading or prostrate shrub with winged stems, winged cladodes, leaves reduced to small scales, and deep yellow and red flowers.

== Description ==
Bossiaea barrettiorum is a low, spreading or prostrate shrub that typically grows up to 0.7 m (2 ft 4 in) high and 2 m (6 ft 7 in) wide. The stems are winged, more or less glabrous with winged cladodes 0.7–8.3 mm (0.028–0.327 in) wide. The leaves are reduced to dark brown, egg-shaped scales, 0.7–1.6 mm (0.028–0.063 in) long. The flowers are arranged singly or in pairs on a pedicel 3.0–4.5 mm (0.12–0.18 in) long with narrow egg-shaped bracts up to 1.6 mm (0.063 in) long. The sepals are joined at the base forming a tube about 3.3 mm (0.13 in) long, the two upper lobes about 2.3 mm (0.091 in) long and the lower three lobes about 1.3 mm (0.051 in) long with narrow egg-shaped bracteoles 1.1–1.6 mm (0.043–0.063 in) long at the base. The standard petal is deep yellow with a red base and about 9.2 mm (0.36 in) long, the wings 8.0 mm (0.31 in) long and the keel yellowish and 9.6 mm (0.38 in) long. Flowering has been observed in December and January and the fruit is an oblong pod 27–48 mm (1.1–1.9 in) long.

== Taxonomy and naming ==
Bossiaea barrettiorum was first formally described in 2006 by James Henderson Ross in the journal Muelleria, from specimens collected by Matthew David Barrett near the Prince Regent River in 2001. The specific epithet (barrettiorum) honours the collector of the type specimens.

== Distribution and habitat ==
This bossiaea is only known from two populations north of the Prince Regent River, growing in sand between sandstone rocks in the North Kimberley biogeographic region of northern Western Australia.

== Conservation status ==
Bossiaea barrettiorum is classified as "Priority Two" by the Western Australian Government Department of Parks and Wildlife meaning that it is poorly known and from only one or a few locations.
