= Bossiaea praetermissa =

Scientific classification
- Kingdom: Plantae
- Clade: Tracheophytes
- Clade: Angiosperms
- Clade: Eudicots
- Clade: Rosids
- Order: Fabales
- Family: Fabaceae
- Subfamily: Faboideae
- Genus: Bossiaea
- Species: B. praetermissa

Binomial name
- Bossiaea praetermissa J.H.Ross

Species of legume

Bossiaea praetermissa is a species of flowering plant in the family Fabaceae and is endemic to near-coastal areas in the far south-west of Western Australia. It is a shrub with many flattened, winged cladodes and deep yellow and reddish or maroon flowers.

== Description ==
Bossiaea praetermissa is a low, spreading or prostrate shrub that typically grows up to a height of 1 m (3 ft 3 in) when supported by other plants, and has many flattened, winged, cladodes up to 7 mm (0.28 in) wide. The leaves, when present, are round to egg-shaped with the narrower end towards the base, 6–18 mm (0.24–0.71 in) long and 6–10 mm (0.24–0.39 in) wide with narrow triangular stipules 0.7–2.5 mm (0.028–0.098 in) long. The flowers are arranged singly or in pairs in nodes along the cladodes, each flower on a hairy pedicel 2–5 mm (0.079–0.197 in) long. The bracts are egg-shaped or oblong 0.7–1.5 mm (0.028–0.059 in) long at the base of the flowers and there are oblong bracteoles 0.6–1.7 mm (0.024–0.067 in) long on the pedicels. The five sepals are hairy and joined at the base, forming a tube 2.7–3.5 mm (0.11–0.14 in) long, the two upper lobes 4–5 mm (0.16–0.20 in) long and the lower lobes 1.1–1.5 mm (0.043–0.059 in) long. The standard petal is deep yellow with a red base and 7.5–9.5 mm (0.30–0.37 in) long, the wings 6.5–8.3 mm (0.26–0.33 in) long, and the keel is red or maroon and 6.4–7.5 mm (0.25–0.30 in) long. Flowering occurs from September to November.

== Taxonomy and naming ==
Bossiaea praetermissa was first formally described in 1994 by James Henderson Ross in the journal Muelleria from specimens collected by Margaret Corrick near Middleton Beach area in 1985. The specific epithet (praetermissa) means "overlooked" or "neglected", because the species seems to have been overlooked since first collected in 1838.

== Distribution and habitat ==
This bossiaea usually grows in sandy soil in coastal heath and is found from near Yallingup to Mount Arid in Cape Arid National Park.

== Conservation status ==
Bossiaea praetermissa is classified as "not threatened" by the Western Australian Government Department of Parks and Wildlife.
