= Bossiaea celata =

Conservation status
- Priority Three — Poorly Known Taxa (DEC)

Scientific classification
- Kingdom: Plantae
- Clade: Tracheophytes
- Clade: Angiosperms
- Clade: Eudicots
- Clade: Rosids
- Order: Fabales
- Family: Fabaceae
- Subfamily: Faboideae
- Genus: Bossiaea
- Species: B. celata

Binomial name
- Bossiaea celata J.H.Ross

Species of flowering plant

Bossiaea celata is a species of flowering plant in the family Fabaceae and is endemic to Western Australia. It is a compact, many-branched shrub with flattened cladodes, leaves reduced to scales, and yellow to pinkish-red pea-like flowers.

== Description ==
Bossiaea celata is a compact, intricately branched shrub that typically grows up to 0.8 m (2 ft 7 in) high and 3 m (9.8 ft) wide with foliage that is glaucous when young. The stems are flattened with slightly winged cladodes 2–3 mm (0.079–0.118 in) wide. The leaves are reduced to egg-shaped scales 0.9–3.3 mm (0.035–0.130 in) long and 0.8–2.1 mm (0.031–0.083 in) wide. The flowers are arranged singly or in pairs, each flower on a pedicel 1.5–4.0 mm (0.059–0.157 in) long with five to seven broadly egg-shaped bracts up to 3.3 mm (0.13 in) long. The sepals are joined at the base forming a tube 2.2–4.6 mm (0.087–0.181 in) long, the two upper lobes 1.2–2.4 mm (0.047–0.094 in) long and the three lower lobes slightly longer with a narrow egg-shaped bracteole 2.0–3.6 mm (0.079–0.142 in) long near the base. The standard petal is yellow with a pinkish-red base around two greenish-yellow "eyes" and 8.7–11.6 mm (0.34–0.46 in) long, the wings 8.0–10.3 mm (0.31–0.41 in) long, pinkish-red and orange-yellow, the keel pinkish red and 8.0–10.4 mm (0.31–0.41 in) long. Flowering occurs from September to October and the fruit is an oblong pod 20–22 mm (0.79–0.87 in) long.

== Taxonomy and naming ==
Bossiaea celata was first formally described in 2006 by James Henderson Ross in the journal Muelleria from specimens collected in Boorabbin National Park in 1998. The specific epithet (celata) means "concealed", referring to the difficulty of locating specimens of this species.

== Distribution and habitat ==
This bossiaea grows in deep sand in open mallee in the Coolgardie biogeographic region of Western Australia.

== Conservation status ==
Bossiaea celata is classified as "Priority Three" by the Government of Western Australia Department of Parks and Wildlife meaning that it is poorly known and known from only a few locations but is not under imminent threat.
