= Bossiaea eremaea =

Conservation status
- Priority Three — Poorly Known Taxa (DEC)

Scientific classification
- Kingdom: Plantae
- Clade: Tracheophytes
- Clade: Angiosperms
- Clade: Eudicots
- Clade: Rosids
- Order: Fabales
- Family: Fabaceae
- Subfamily: Faboideae
- Genus: Bossiaea
- Species: B. eremaea

Binomial name
- Bossiaea eremaea J.H.Ross

Species of flowering plant

Bossiaea eremaea is a species of flowering plant in the family Fabaceae and is endemic to Western Australia. It is an openly-branched, spreading, more or less leafless shrub with deep yellow and purplish flowers.

== Description ==
Bossiaea eremaea is an openly-branched, spreading shrub that typically grows up to 1.2 m (3 ft 11 in) high and 1.5 m (4 ft 11 in) wide with young branchlets that or slightly flattened to oval in cross-section. The leaves, when present, are oval, elliptic or oblong, 2.2–6 mm (0.087–0.236 in) long and 1.7–3.5 mm (0.067–0.138 in) wide, but usually quickly fall off. The flowers are arranged singly or in small groups, each flower on a pedicel 1–5 mm (0.039–0.197 in) long with overlapping, broadly egg-shaped bracts up to 1.0 mm (0.039 in) long. The sepals are joined at the base forming a tube 2–4 mm (0.079–0.157 in) long, with five pinkish-red lobes, the two upper lobes 0.9–1.9 mm (0.035–0.075 in) long and the three lower lobes 0.8–1.2 mm (0.031–0.047 in) long, with egg-shaped bracteoles 1.1–1.5 mm (0.043–0.059 in) long on the pedicel. The standard petal is deep yellow with a purplish-brown base and 6.8–10.1 mm (0.27–0.40 in) long, the wings pinkish-red with a yellow tip and 6.1–8.5 mm (0.24–0.33 in) long, the keel purplish-red and 5.8–8.1 mm (0.23–0.32 in) long. Flowering occurs from July to September and the fruit is a pod 16–21 mm (0.63–0.83 in) long.

== Taxonomy and naming ==
Bossiaea eremaea was first formally described in 2006 by James Henderson Ross in the journal Muelleria from specimens he collected east of Mount Magnet in 1998. The specific epithet (eremaea) means "desert", referring to the deep sand in which this species grows.

== Distribution and habitat ==
This bossiaea grows in deep sand in woodland from near Sandstone to near Laverton in the Great Victoria Desert and Murchison biogeographic regions of Western Australia.

== Conservation status ==
Bossiaea eremaea is classified as "Priority Three" by the Government of Western Australia Department of Parks and Wildlife meaning that it is poorly known and known from only a few locations but is not under imminent threat.
