= Bossiaea barbarae =

Scientific classification
- Kingdom: Plantae
- Clade: Tracheophytes
- Clade: Angiosperms
- Clade: Eudicots
- Clade: Rosids
- Order: Fabales
- Family: Fabaceae
- Subfamily: Faboideae
- Genus: Bossiaea
- Species: B. barbarae

Binomial name
- Bossiaea barbarae J.H.Ross

Species of flowering plant

Bossiaea barbarae is a species of flowering plant in the family Fabaceae and is endemic to Western Australia. It is an erect, compact, spiny shrub with egg-shaped to elliptic or oblong leaves, and deep yellow and bright red flowers.

== Description ==
Bossiaea barbarae is an erect, compact, glaucous, spiny shrub that typically grows up to 0.75 m (2 ft 6 in) high and 1.5 m (4 ft 11 in) wide, the short side-branches ending in a sharp, reddish-brown point. The leaves are oblong to elliptic or egg-shaped with the narrower end towards the base, 1.2–3.9 mm (0.047–0.154 in) long and 0.9–2.0 mm (0.035–0.079 in) wide on a petiole 0.3–0.7 mm (0.012–0.028 in) long with a stipule 0.6–2.0 mm (0.024–0.079 in) long at the base. The flowers are arranged singly or in pairs in leaf axils, each flower on a pedicel 3–6 mm (0.12–0.24 in) long with bracts, the largest bract 0.5–1.2 mm (0.020–0.047 in) long. The sepals are glabrous, joined at the base forming a tube 1.5–3.0 mm (0.059–0.118 in) long, the two upper lobes 0.8–1.4 mm (0.031–0.055 in) long and the lower three lobes slightly shorter. The standard petal is deep yellow with a bright red base and 7.0–9.3 mm (0.28–0.37 in) long, the wings 5.8–7.2 mm (0.23–0.28 in) long and the keel 5.1–5.8 mm (0.20–0.23 in) long and red. Flowering occurs from August to October and the fruit is a pod 8–16 mm (0.31–0.63 in) long.

== Taxonomy and naming ==
Bossiaea barbarae was first formally described in 2006 by James Henderson Ross in the journal Muelleria from specimens collected near Salmon Gums in 1998. The specific epithet (barbarae) honours "Barbara Archer of Norseman", the collector of the type specimens.

== Distribution and habitat ==
This bossiaea usually grows near the edges of salt lakes in the Coolgardie, Esperance plains and Mallee biogeographic regions of Western Australia.

== Conservation status ==
Bossiaea barbarae is classified as "not threatened" by the Government of Western Australia Department of Parks and Wildlife.
