= Hovea arnhemica =

Scientific classification
- Kingdom: Plantae
- Clade: Tracheophytes
- Clade: Angiosperms
- Clade: Eudicots
- Clade: Rosids
- Order: Fabales
- Family: Fabaceae
- Subfamily: Faboideae
- Genus: Hovea
- Species: H. arnhemica

Binomial name
- Hovea arnhemica J.H.Ross

Species of legume

Hovea arnhemica, is a species of flowering plant in the family Fabaceae and is endemic to the Top End of the Northern Territory. It is a subshrub with light brown hairs, narrowly egg-shaped or elliptic leaves with stipules at the base, and mostly white, pea-like flowers.

== Description ==
Hovea arnhemica is a multi-stemmed subshrub that typically grows to a height of up to 60 cm (24 in), its foliage densely covered with white to light brown hairs. The leaves are mostly narrowly egg-shaped to elliptic, 20–63 mm (0.79–2.48 in) long, 8–15 mm (0.31–0.59 in) wide on a petiole up to 3 mm (0.12 in) long with tapering stipules up to 3 mm (0.12 in) long at the base. The flowers are usually arranged in pairs or threes, each flower on a hairy pedicel up to 1.5 mm (0.059 in) long with bracteoles 0.8–2.8 mm (0.031–0.110 in) long at the base of the sepals. The sepals are joined at the base, the two upper lobes 5.5–6.0 mm (0.22–0.24 in) long, the three lower lobes 2.0–2.7 mm (0.079–0.106 in) long. The standard petal is white with a greenish-yellow centre and 6.0–6.6 mm (0.24–0.26 in) long, 7–8 mm (0.28–0.31 in) wide. The wings are 5.7–6 mm (0.22–0.24 in) long and the keel 4.8–5.2 mm (0.19–0.20 in) long. The fruit is a pod 11–14 mm (0.43–0.55 in) long.

== Taxonomy and naming ==
Hovea arnhemica was first formally described in 1989 by James Henderson Ross in the journal, Muelleria from specimens collected in Arnhem Land by C.R. Dunlop in 1984. The species had been collected by Allan Cunningham on 21 April 1818 at Port Essington when he accompanied Lieutenant King on the Mermaid.

== Distribution and habitat ==
This species of pea grows in forest in Arnhem Land, north and north-west of Gunbalanya.
