= Bossiaea atrata =

Conservation status
- Priority Three — Poorly Known Taxa (DEC)

Scientific classification
- Kingdom: Plantae
- Clade: Tracheophytes
- Clade: Angiosperms
- Clade: Eudicots
- Clade: Rosids
- Order: Fabales
- Family: Fabaceae
- Subfamily: Faboideae
- Genus: Bossiaea
- Species: B. atrata

Binomial name
- Bossiaea atrata J.H.Ross

Species of flowering plant

Bossiaea atrata is a species of flowering plant in the family Fabaceae and is endemic to the south-west of Western Australia. It is a dense, erect, spiny shrub with oblong to elliptic or almost round leaves, and orange-yellow and dark red flowers.

== Description ==
Bossiaea atrata is a dense, erect, spiny shrub that typically grows to 1.2 m (3 ft 11 in) high and 1.0 m (3 ft 3 in) wide and has more or less glabrous branches with short side-branches ending in a sharp point. The leaves are oblong to elliptic or almost round, 1.5–4.2 mm (0.059–0.165 in) long and 1.1–2.2 mm (0.043–0.087 in) wide on a petiole 0.4–1.0 mm (0.016–0.039 in) long and with a stipule 0.5–1.2 mm (0.020–0.047 in) long at the base. The flowers are arranged singly or in small groups on short side branches ending in a spine, each flower on a dark purplish pedicel 3–7 mm (0.12–0.28 in) long with several bracts at the base. The sepals are dark red or purplish, joined at the base forming a tube 2.1–3.8 mm (0.083–0.150 in) long, the two upper lobes 1.2–2.2 mm (0.047–0.087 in) long and the lower three lobes 0.7–1.5 mm (0.028–0.059 in) long. The standard petal is orange-yellow with a reddish base and 7.5–10.0 mm (0.30–0.39 in) long, the wings 7.2–8.3 mm (0.28–0.33 in) long and the keel 6.2–7.0 mm (0.24–0.28 in) long. Flowering occurs from May to August and the fruit is an oblong pod 12–25 mm (0.47–0.98 in) long.

== Taxonomy and naming ==
Bossiaea atrata was first formally described in 2006 by James Henderson Ross in the journal Muelleria from specimens collected near Manmanning in 1990. The specific epithet (atrata) means "clothed in black" referring to the dark pedicels and sepals.

== Distribution and habitat ==
This bossiaea occurs in scattered locations between Manmanning, Lake Grace and Lake King in the Avon Wheatbelt, Coolgardie, Esperance Plains and Mallee biogeographic regions of south-western Western Australia.

== Conservation status ==
Bossiaea atrata is classified as "Priority Three" by the Government of Western Australia Department of Parks and Wildlife meaning that it is poorly known and known from only a few locations but is not under imminent threat.
