= Bossiaea cucullata =

Scientific classification
- Kingdom: Plantae
- Clade: Tracheophytes
- Clade: Angiosperms
- Clade: Eudicots
- Clade: Rosids
- Order: Fabales
- Family: Fabaceae
- Subfamily: Faboideae
- Genus: Bossiaea
- Species: B. cucullata

Binomial name
- Bossiaea cucullata J.H.Ross

Species of flowering plant

Bossiaea cucullata is a species of flowering plant in the family Fabaceae and is endemic to Western Australia. It is a dense, many-branched shrub with narrow-winged cladodes, leaves reduced to dark brown scales, and yellow and deep red or pale greenish-yellow flowers.

== Description ==
Bossiaea cucullata is a rigid, dense, many-branched shrub that typically grows up to 2 m (6 ft 7 in) high and 5 m (16 ft) wide with greyish-green, more or less glabrous foliage. The branches are sometimes flattened with slightly winged cladodes 2–5 mm (0.079–0.197 in) wide. The leaves are reduced to dark brown, egg-shaped scales 0.7–1.5 mm (0.028–0.059 in) long. The flowers are usually arranged singly, each flower on a pedicel up to 5 mm (0.20 in) long with overlapping, broadly egg-shaped bracts up to 1.1 mm (0.043 in) long. The sepals are joined at the base forming a tube 2.3–4.4 mm (0.091–0.173 in) long, the two upper lobes 4.9–10.2 mm (0.19–0.40 in) long and the three lower lobes 1.1–2.4 mm (0.043–0.094 in) long, with a broadly egg-shaped bracteole 1.0–1.2 mm (0.039–0.047 in) long on the pedicel. The standard petal is usually deep yellow to orange-yellow and 10.0–14.4 mm (0.39–0.57 in) long, the wings about the same length as the standard, the keel deep red, maroon or greenish-yellow and 13.5–26 mm (0.53–1.02 in) long. Flowering occurs from March to October and the fruit is an oblong pod 25–48 mm (0.98–1.89 in) long.

== Taxonomy and naming ==
Bossiaea cucullata was first formally described in 1998 by James Henderson Ross in the journal Muelleria from specimens collected on the western side of Lake King in 1997. The specific epithet (cucullata) means "hooded", referring to the upper sepal lobes.

== Distribution and habitat ==
This bossiaea grows in deep sand around the edge of salt lakes in the Avon Wheatbelt, Coolgardie, Mallee and Murchison biogeographic regions of Western Australia.

== Conservation status ==
Bossiaea cucullata is classified as "not threatened" by the Government of Western Australia Department of Parks and Wildlife.
