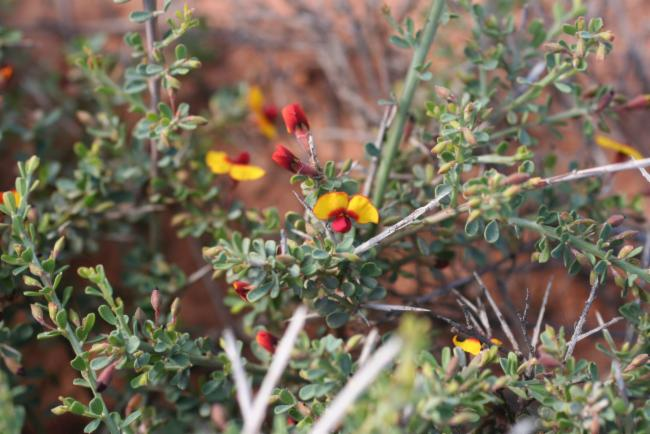

Conservation status
- Priority Three — Poorly Known Taxa (DEC)

Scientific classification
- Kingdom: Plantae
- Clade: Tracheophytes
- Clade: Angiosperms
- Clade: Eudicots
- Clade: Rosids
- Order: Fabales
- Family: Fabaceae
- Subfamily: Faboideae
- Genus: Bossiaea
- Species: B. calcicola

Binomial name
- Bossiaea calcicola J.H.Ross

= Bossiaea calcicola =

Species of flowering plant

Bossiaea calcicola is a species of flowering plant in the family Fabaceae and is endemic to the far west of Western Australia. It is compact, glaucous, spiny shrub with oblong, wedge-shaped or round leaves and bright yellow, reddish and greenish-yellow flowers.

== Description ==
Bossiaea calcicola is a compact, glaucous, spiny shrub that typically grows to a height of up to 0.7 m (2 ft 4 in) with branchlets that are oval to flattened when young. The stems are winged, more or less glabrous with winged cladodes 0.7–8.3 mm (0.028–0.327 in) wide. The leaves are oblong, wedge-shaped to more or less round, 1.5–7.0 mm (0.059–0.276 in) long and 1.1–4.0 mm (0.043–0.157 in) wide. The flowers are arranged singly or in small groups, each flower on a pedicel 4.5–7.2 mm (0.18–0.28 in) long with one or more oblong or egg-shaped bracts 0.6–1.2 mm (0.024–0.047 in) long. The sepals are joined at the base forming a tube 1.7–2.9 mm (0.067–0.114 in) long, the two upper lobes 0.9–1.3 mm (0.035–0.051 in) long and the lower three lobes 0.7–1.2 mm (0.028–0.047 in) long with an oblong bracteole 0.5–1.4 mm (0.020–0.055 in) long near the base. The standard petal is bright yellow with a reddish base around two greenish-yellow "eyes" and 7.4–8.2 mm (0.29–0.32 in) long, the wings 5.9–7.0 mm (0.23–0.28 in) long and pinkish-red, the keel pinkish red and 5.2–5.8 mm (0.20–0.23 in) long. Flowering occurs from July to September and the fruit is a pod 12–22 mm (0.47–0.87 in) long.

== Taxonomy and naming ==
Bossiaea calcicola was first formally described in 2006 by James Henderson Ross in the journal Muelleria, from specimens collected near Eagle Gorge in Kalbarri National Park in 1989. The specific epithet (calcicola) means "limestone-dweller", referring to this species' habitat preference.

== Distribution and habitat ==
This bossiaea grows on coastal cliffs and slopes in soil derived from limestone and occurs between Dirk Hartog Island and Geraldton in the Carnarvon, Geraldton Sandplains and Yalgoo biogeographic regions in the far west of Western Australia.

== Conservation status ==
Bossiaea calcicola is classified as "Priority Three" by the Government of Western Australia Department of Parks and Wildlife meaning that it is poorly known and known from only a few locations but is not under imminent threat.
