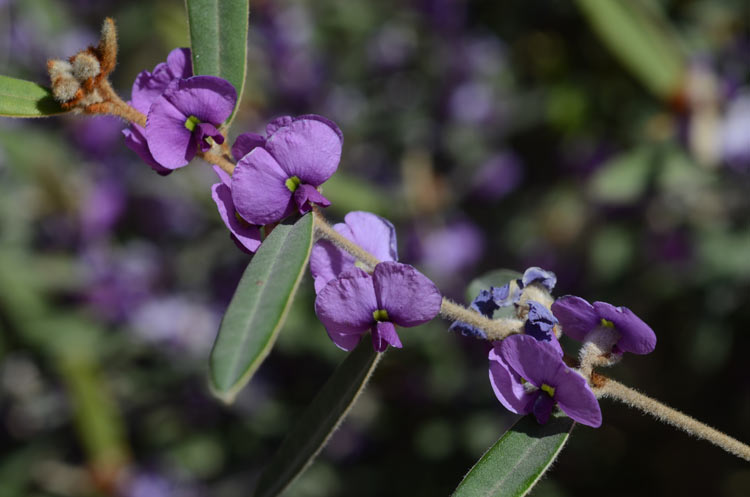

Scientific classification
- Kingdom: Plantae
- Clade: Tracheophytes
- Clade: Angiosperms
- Clade: Eudicots
- Clade: Rosids
- Order: Fabales
- Family: Fabaceae
- Subfamily: Faboideae
- Genus: Hovea
- Species: H. planifolia

Binomial name
- Hovea planifolia (Domin) J.H.Ross

Synonyms
- Hovea longifolia subvar. planifolia Domin; Hovea longifolia var. purpurea (Sweet) Domin p.p.

= Hovea planifolia =

Species of legume

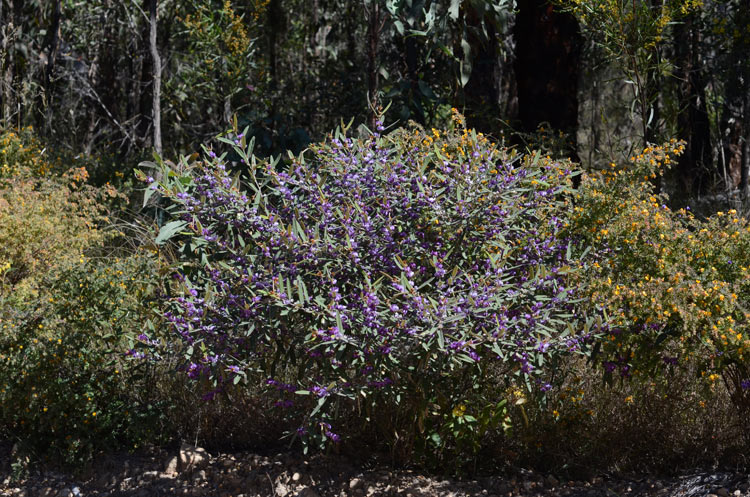
Habit near Expedition National Park

Hovea planifolia, is a species of flowering plant in the family Fabaceae and is endemic to Queensland, Australia. It is a shrub with very narrowly elliptic, lance-shaped or strap-like leaves, purplish flowers and oval or egg-shaped pods.

== Description ==
Hovea planifolia is a shrub that typically grows to a height of up to 2.5 m (8 ft 2 in), with branchlets covered in grey hairs. Its leaves are very narrowly elliptic, lance-shaped or strap-like, 40–120 mm (1.6–4.7 in) long and 9–25 mm (0.35–0.98 in) wide on a petiole 3–9 mm (0.12–0.35 in) long, with more or less flat edges, the upper surface smooth with a few scattered weak hairs. There are stipules 2–3.2 mm (0.079–0.126 in) long at the base of the leaves. The flowers are borne in groups of three on a peduncle 0.5–8 mm (0.020–0.315 in) long, each flower on a pedicel 2–3 mm (0.079–0.118 in) long. The flowers are pinkish-purple at first, later purplish, with narrowly egg-shaped to egg-shaped bracts and bracteoles 2.4–3.5 mm (0.094–0.138 in) long. The sepals are 4–5.2 mm (0.16–0.20 in) long, forming a tube 2–3.5 mm (0.079–0.138 in) long, the upper lip about 3 mm (0.12 in) wide. The standard petal is 8.6–9.57 mm (0.339–0.377 in) long with a green-yellow centre, the wings 3.3–4.2 mm (0.13–0.17 in) wide. Flowering occurs in August and September and the fruit is a sessile or subsessile, densely hairy pod. The seed has an aril about 5 mm (0.20 in) long.

== Taxonomy and naming ==
This species was first formally described in 1926 by Karel Domin who gave it the name Hovea longifolia subvar. planifolia in Bibliotheca Botanica from specimens collected near the Brisbane River. In 1989, James Henderson Ross raised the variety to species status as Hovea planifolia in the journal Muelleria. The specific epithet (planifolia) means 'flat-leaved'.

== Distribution and habitat ==
This hovea grows in sandy soils or on sandstone outcrops in forest, woodland and heath in south-eastern Queensland between Salvatora Rosa National Park and Mount Bangalora near the border with New South Wales.
