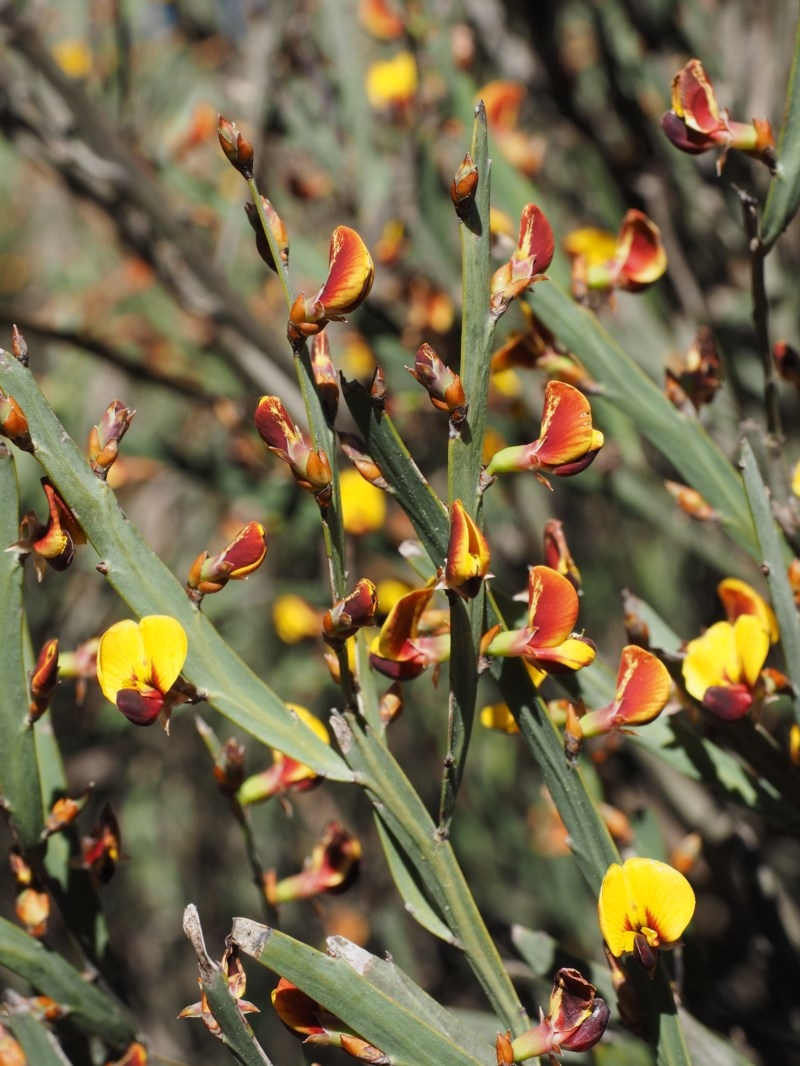
- Near Paddys River

Scientific classification
- Kingdom: Plantae
- Clade: Tracheophytes
- Clade: Angiosperms
- Clade: Eudicots
- Clade: Rosids
- Order: Fabales
- Family: Fabaceae
- Subfamily: Faboideae
- Genus: Bossiaea
- Species: B. grayi

Binomial name
- Bossiaea grayi K.L.McDougall

= Bossiaea grayi =

Murrumbidgee bossiaea

Species of flowering plant

Pultenaea grayi, commonly known as Murrumbidgee bossiaea, is a species of flowering plant in the family Fabaceae and is endemic to the Australian Capital Territory. It is an erect shrub with flattened, winged, glabrous cladodes, leaves reduced to small scales, and pea-like, yellow and red flowers.

== Description ==
Bossiaea grayi is an erect, rhizome-forming shrub that typically grows to a height of up to 1.5 m (4 ft 11 in). The flowers are borne on flattened, winged, more or less erect cladodes up to 8 mm (0.31 in) wide. The leaves are reduced to reddish-brown scales, 1.3–2.0 mm (0.051–0.079 in) long and pressed against the cladode. The flowers are borne singly at nodes on the cladode, each on a pedicel 1–2 mm (0.039–0.079 in) long with overlapping, dark brown bracts up to 2.5 mm (0.098 in) long, at the base. The five sepals are 5.0–6.5 mm (0.20–0.26 in) long and joined at the base forming a tube with more or less equal lobes 1.5–2.5 mm (0.059–0.098 in) long. There are also bracteoles but that fall off before the flower opens. The standard petal is deep yellow with a red base and 9.5–11.0 mm (0.37–0.43 in) long, the wings yellow with a red base and about 9–10 mm (0.35–0.39 in) long and the keel is dark red and 9–10 mm (0.35–0.39 in) long. Flowering occurs in September and October and the fruit is an oblong pod 20–29 mm (0.79–1.14 in) long.

== Taxonomy and naming ==
Bossiaea grayi was first formally described in 2009 by Keith Leonard McDougall in the journal Telopea from specimens collected near the Murrumbidgee River, downstream from the Kambah Pool in 1980. The specific epithet (grayi) honours the retired taxonomist Max Gray.

== Distribution and habitat ==
Murrumbidgee bossiaea grows in woodland on the banks of the Murrumbidgee River and its tributaries in the Australian Capital Territory.

== Conservation status ==
Bossiaea grayi is listed as "endangered" under the Australian Capital Territory Government Nature Conservation Act 2014.
