= Matthias Ernst Boretius =

Matthias Ernst Boretius (18 May 1694 – 4 October 1738) was a Prussian botanist and physician who served as a professor of medicine at the University of Königsberg. He was the first to introduce smallpox variolation into Polish Prussia.

Boretius was born in Lec / Lötzen (Giżycko), Prussia where his father was a pastor. He studied theology at the university in Königsberg. His father died in a plague epidemic and he then chose to study medicine at the University of Leiden and received a doctorate in 1720 with a dissertation on hawkweeds under Hermann Boerhaave. In 1721 he travelled through England where he observed smallpox vaccination experiments on prisoners conducted by Hans Sloane and others. He wrote about vaccination after returning to Königsberg where he became a professor. He promoted vaccination in Prussia. He collected plants and established a herbarium which was arranged according to the ideas of Joseph Pitton de Tournefort. His brother Johann Friedrich was married to the daughter of the botanist Georg Andreas Helwing who had been a teacher of Boretius. Boretius is also referred to as the son-in-law of Helwing.
