= Georg Andreas Helwing =

German botanist and Lutheran pastor (1666–1748)

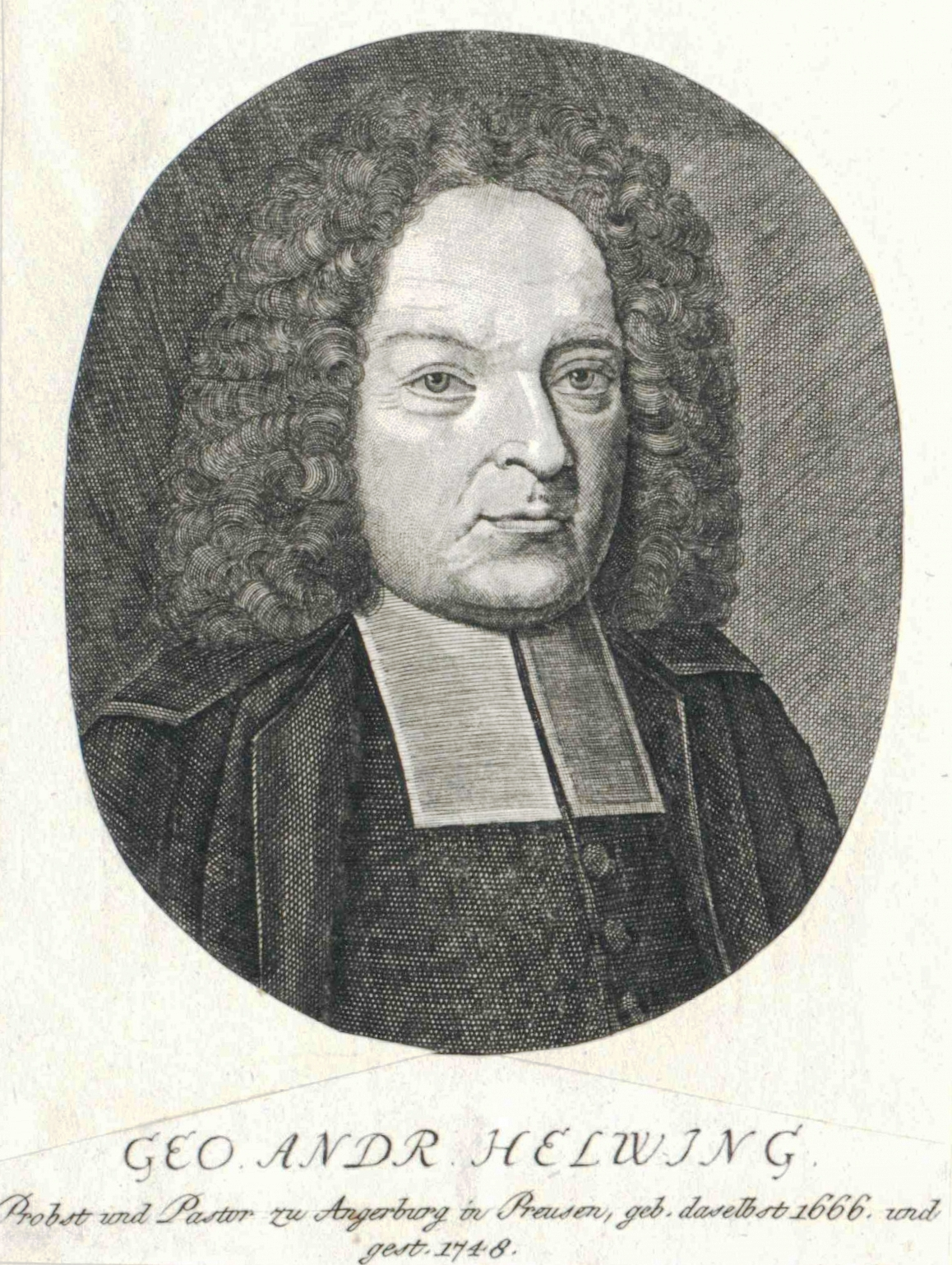
Georg Andreas Helwing

Georg Andreas Helwing (Polish: Jerzy Andrzej Helwing) (14 December 1666 – 3 January 1748) was a botanist and Lutheran pastor. He also contributed studies in paleontology and geology although following the older tradition of diluvianism. The plant genus Helwingia is named in his honour.

== Biography ==
Helwing was born in Angerburg (Węgorzewo) in Brandenburg-Prussia's Duchy of Prussia. He studied natural sciences at Königsberg, Wittenberg, Leipzig, and Jena and received a master's degree in 1688. He then travelled to Germany and Italy and gave lectures in academic circles. He returned to Węgorzewo in 1691 and married Katarzyna Kącka. They had nine children. He was a keen naturalist and collector of specimens and his collections were once the largest in Prussia. He became a corresponding member of the Prussian Academy of Sciences on 31 August 1709. His main interest was in plants and he discovered and introduced several plants: Helwingia is named after him. He published a book in 1712 on the plants, following it up in 1726, recording the German and Polish names. He established a botanical garden in Stulichy. He became known as the Tournefortius Borussicus and Prussian Plinius. His geological works included Lithographia Angerburgica, and Fossilium Silesiae Catalogus published in 1717. He corresponded extensively with Jacob Scheuchzer on geology and with J. T. Klein and J. F. Breyne on botany.

Helwing was buried at the church of St. Peter and Paul in Węgorzewo. In 1999, the University of Warmia and Mazury in Olsztyn was founded with reference to him. The botanist Matthias Ernst Boretius (1694-1738) was his son-in-law and Jerzy Krzysztof Pisanski (1725-1790) was a grandson. His herbarium collections are held at the National Library in Warsaw and contains nearly 700 sheets.

It has been suggested that Georg Andreas Helwing was the inspiration for the character Abraham Van Helsing in Bram Stoker's famous novel Dracula.

== Works ==
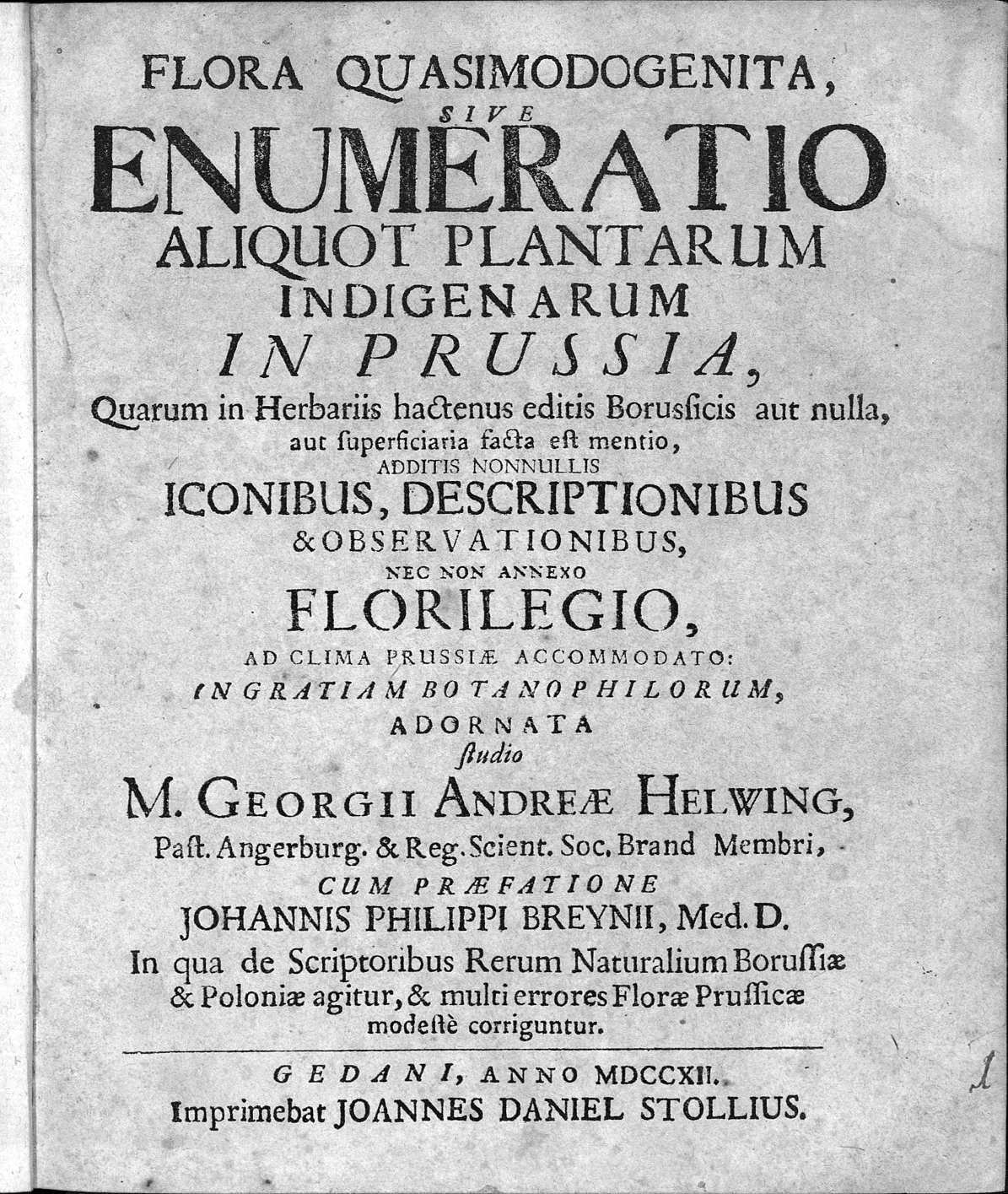
Flora Quasimodogenita, 1712

- Flora Quasimodogenita (in Latin). Gdańsk: Johann Daniel Stolle. 1712.
  - Flora Quasimodogenita. Gedani. Leipzig 1713
  - Flora Quasimodogenita (in Latin). Vol. Supplementum Florae Prussicae. Gdańsk: Thomas Johann Schreiber. 1726.
- Lithographia Angerburgica, P.I. Regiom. 1717, Leipzig 1720
- Flora Campana. Leipzig 1720
