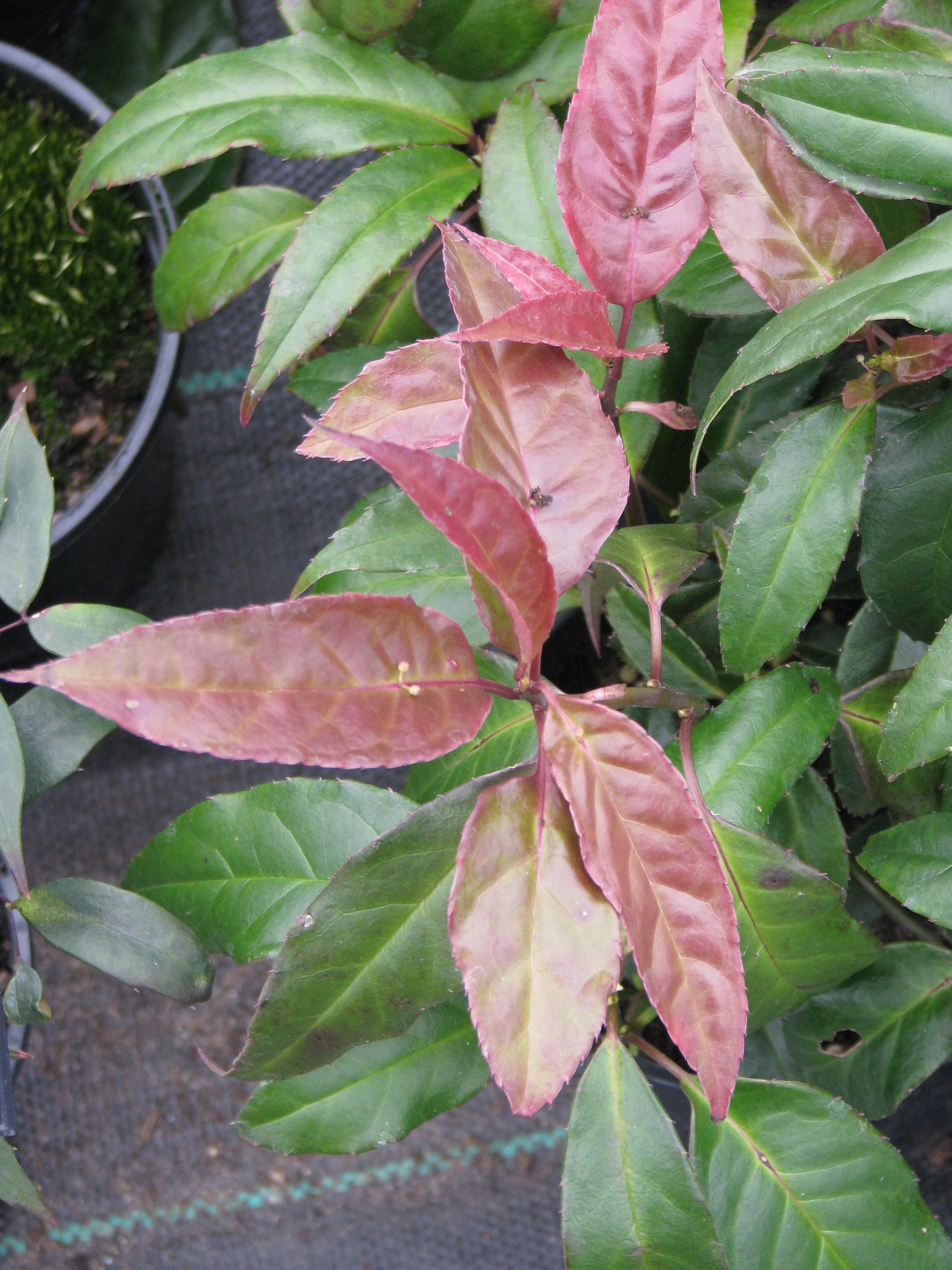
- Helwingia chinensis plant

Scientific classification
- Kingdom: Plantae
- Clade: Tracheophytes
- Clade: Angiosperms
- Clade: Eudicots
- Clade: Asterids
- Order: Aquifoliales
- Family: Helwingiaceae
- Genus: Helwingia
- Species: H. chinensis

Binomial name
- Helwingia chinensis Batalin

= Helwingia chinensis =

Species of plant

Helwingia chinensis is a plant species first described by Alexander Theodorowicz Batalin. Helwingia chinensis is part of the genus Helwingia and the family Helwingiaceae.

It was collected and brought to the United States by Daniel J. Hinkley as part of his expedition to China's Sichuan Province in 1996.

== Varieties ==
Helwingia chinesis var. crenata.
