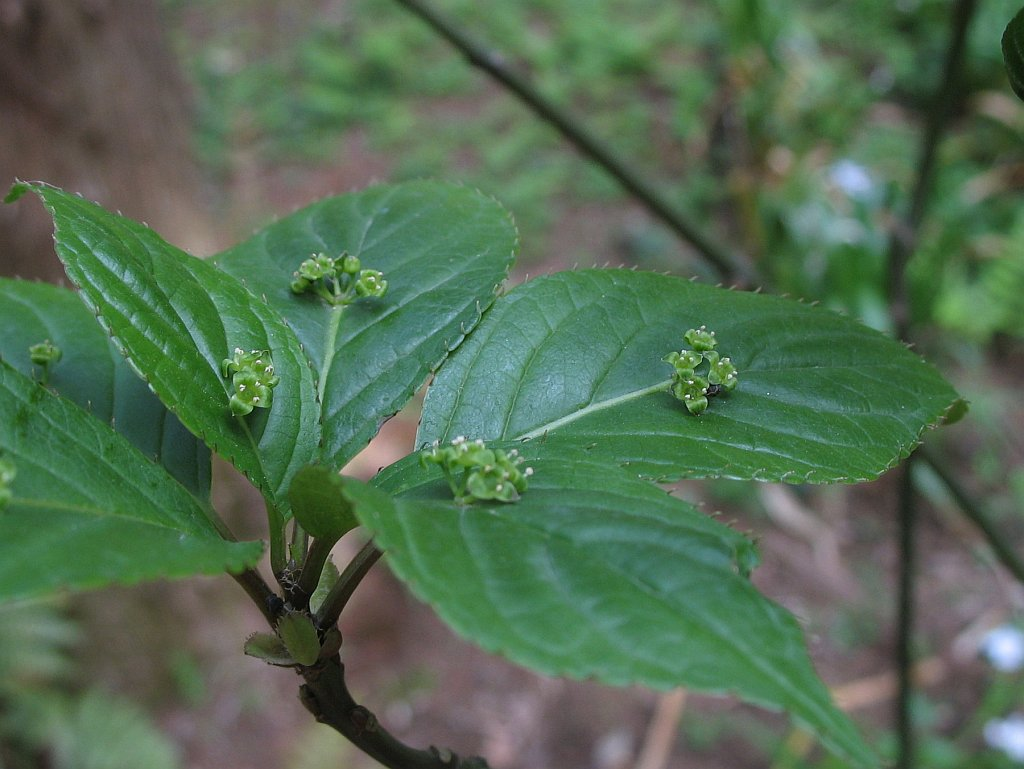
- Flowering Helwingia japonica var. japonica specimen
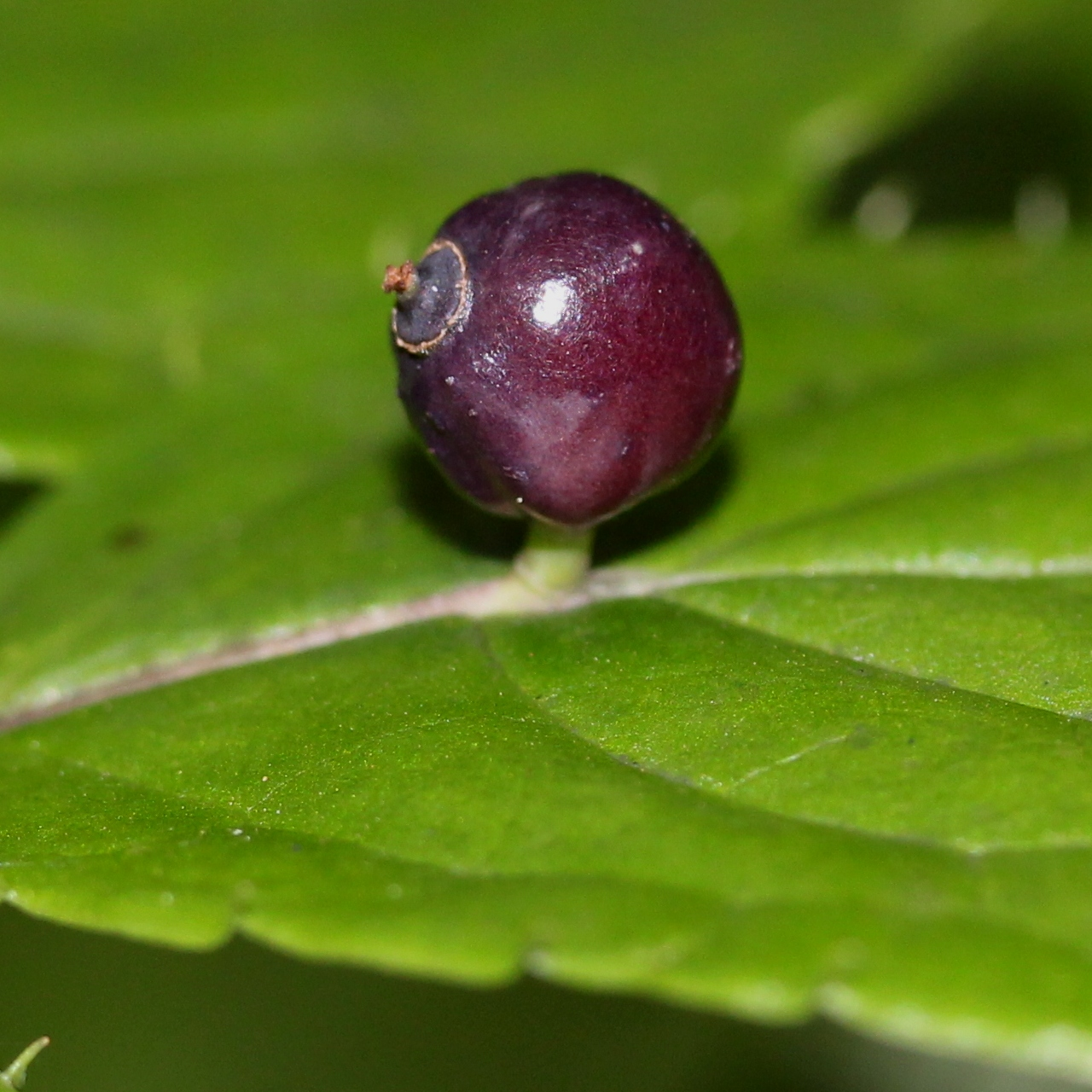
- Detail of epiphyllous Helwingia japonica fruit

Scientific classification
- Kingdom: Plantae
- Clade: Tracheophytes
- Clade: Angiosperms
- Clade: Eudicots
- Clade: Asterids
- Order: Aquifoliales
- Family: Helwingiaceae; Decne.
- Genus: Helwingia; Willd.
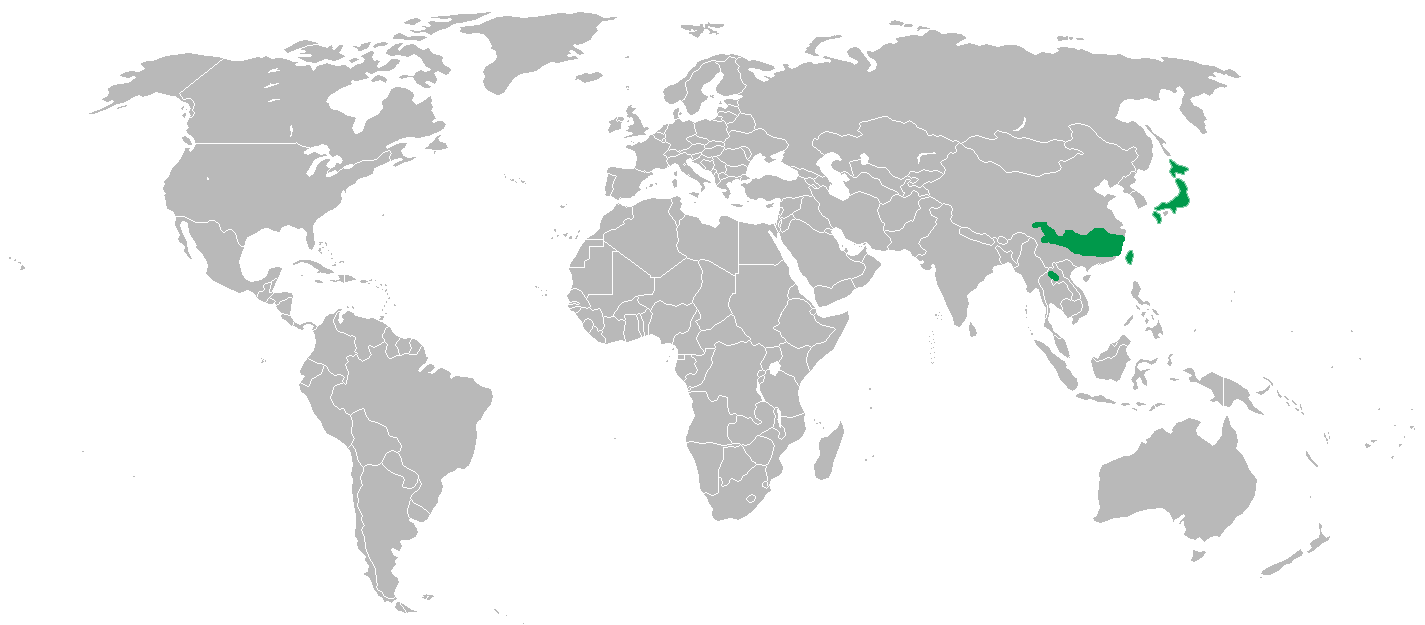
- Distribution of Helwingia

= Helwingia =

Genus of flowering plants

The genus Helwingia consists of shrubs or rarely small trees native to eastern Asia, the Himalayas, and northern Indochina. It is the only genus in the family Helwingiaceae.

== Description ==
The plants have alternate, evergreen or deciduous leaves and small inflorescences that are epiphyllous (growing from the leaf surface). During development, the flowers appear separate from the leaves,, eventually fusing with the leaf midrib. Flowers are small and yellow-green or purple, followed by red or black berries. Plants are dioecious.

=== Epiphyllous inflorescences ===
This trait is rather unusual among plants. This atypical floral position upon a leaf is believed to be an adaption to insect pollination. Pollinators which are too large to be supported by the floral pedicels, land on the leaf surface and can pollinate the flowers, which would not be able to support the pollinators on their own.

== Taxonomy ==
The APG II classification (2003) places them in the order Aquifoliales, along with the hollies and Phyllonomaceae, which also has epiphyllous flowers.

The family Helwingiaceae does not exist in the Cronquist classification (1981), which places this genus in the Cornaceae (dogwood family). Helwingia has also previously been placed in the Araliaceae (ginseng family).

The family is named for botanist Georg Andreas Helwing.

== Species ==
Species adapted from the World Checklist of Selected Plant Families:

- Helwingia chinensis Batalin - Thailand, Myanmar, China: Gansu, Guizhou, Hubei, Hunan, Shaanxi, Sichuan, Tibet, Yunnan
- Helwingia himalaica Hook.f. & Thomson ex C.B.Clarke - Thailand, Myanmar, Bhutan, Nepal, India: Assam, Sikkim, China: Tibet, Chongqing, Guangdong, Guangxi, Guizhou, Hubei, Hunan, Sichuan, Yunnan
- Helwingia japonica (Thunb.) F.Dietr. - Japan (incl. Ryukyu Islands), Korea, Taiwan, Myanmar, Bhutan, Vietnam, India: Assam, Sikkim, China: Anhui, Fujian, Gansu, Guangdong, Guangxi, Guizhou, Henan, Hubei, Hunan, Jiangsu, Jiangxi, Shaanxi, Shandong, Shanxi, Sichuan, Yunnan, Zhejiang
- Helwingia omeiensis (W.P.Fang) H.Hara & S.Kuros. - China: Gansu, Guangxi, Guizhou, Hubei, Hunan, Shaanxi, Sichuan, Yunnan
