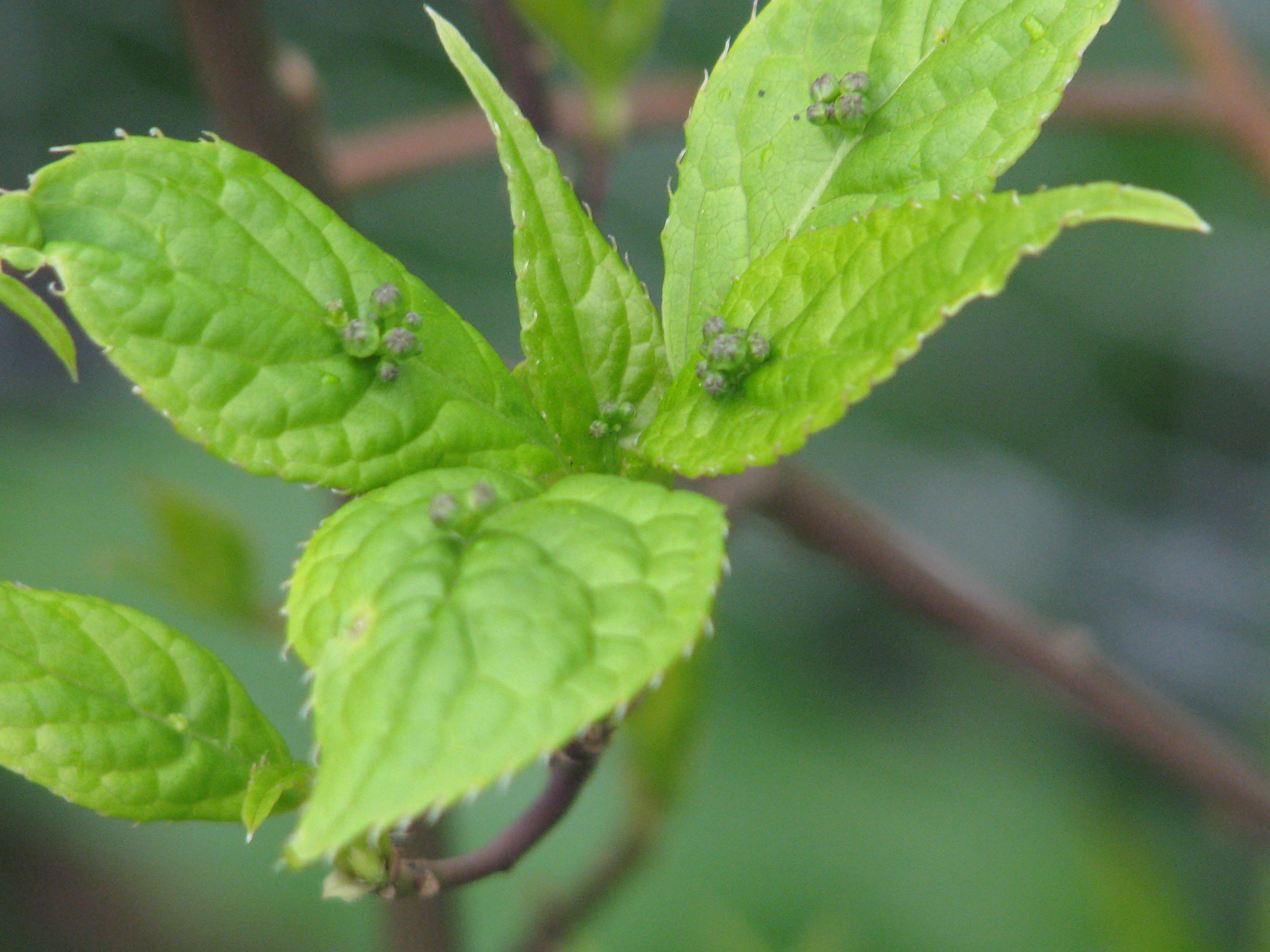

Scientific classification
- Kingdom: Plantae
- Clade: Tracheophytes
- Clade: Angiosperms
- Clade: Eudicots
- Clade: Asterids
- Order: Aquifoliales
- Family: Helwingiaceae
- Genus: Helwingia
- Species: H. japonica

Binomial name
- Helwingia japonica (Thunb.) F.Dietr.

= Helwingia japonica =

Species of plant

Helwingia japonica, the Japanese helwingia, is a species of flowering plant in the family Helwingiaceae. It is native to South-East Asia.

== Description ==
Helwingia japonica is a dioecious shrub with height varying between 1 and 2 metres (3.3 and 6.6 ft), and may spread 1–1.5 metres (3.3–4.9 ft), with leaves of 6–12 centimetres (2.4–4.7 in) in length. The lateral and midvein are concave, and the leaves' colors are green. Flowers grow from the center of the leaf midribs, taking the shape of a simple umbel inflorescence. In male specimens, 3–10 small green or purplish-green flowers grow but only 3–5 will open simultaneously. The female plants have 1–3 flowers. Flowering takes place between April and May, and fruiting is from August to September.

== Reproduction ==
The Helwingia japonica is a dioecious plant, meaning that male and female sexual functions occur on separate plants. In the male plant, the flowers have a small calyx with 3–5 stamens and one long pedicel. The female plant has a short pedicel and one pistil, with 3–5 stigma branches and an inferior ovary that has 3–5 ovules, but no stamens. For reproduction to take place, it requires pollination. The female plants flowers will then turn into fruits. The fruits are small black or red berries.

== Cultivation ==
They can be grown in places that are moist with good drainage, such as in partially shaded areas. It can tolerate temperatures as low as −7 °C (19 °F). The plant requires low maintenance, but to produce fruit, it requires both male and female plants. Mature seed can be collected from fruit be put to storage or sowed after being rinsed and left to dry.

== Range ==
Helwingia japonica is found in moist rich soil in forests and thickets in hills and low mountains at elevations of 100–3,400 metres (330–11,150 ft) in Japan, Bhutan, South Korea, Myanmar, and in multiple Chinese provinces.

== Uses ==
The plants are edible. The young leaves are used for culinary purposes, such as being cooked with rice or boiled. The flowers can also be eaten.

One source mentions the use of the plant for medical purposes, such to activate blood circulation, remove blood stasis, help with urination pain, and the use of the fruit to relieve stomach aches.

== Subspecies ==
The species is divided into the following subspecies and varieties:

- Helwingia japonica subsp. japonica
- Helwingia japonica subsp. liukiuensis
- Helwingia japonica subsp. taiwaniana
- Helwingia japonica var. formosana
- Helwingia japonica var. hypoleuca
- Helwingia japonica var. papillosa
- Helwingia japonica var. parviflora
