= Phylloclade =

Flattened, photosynthesizing plant shoot

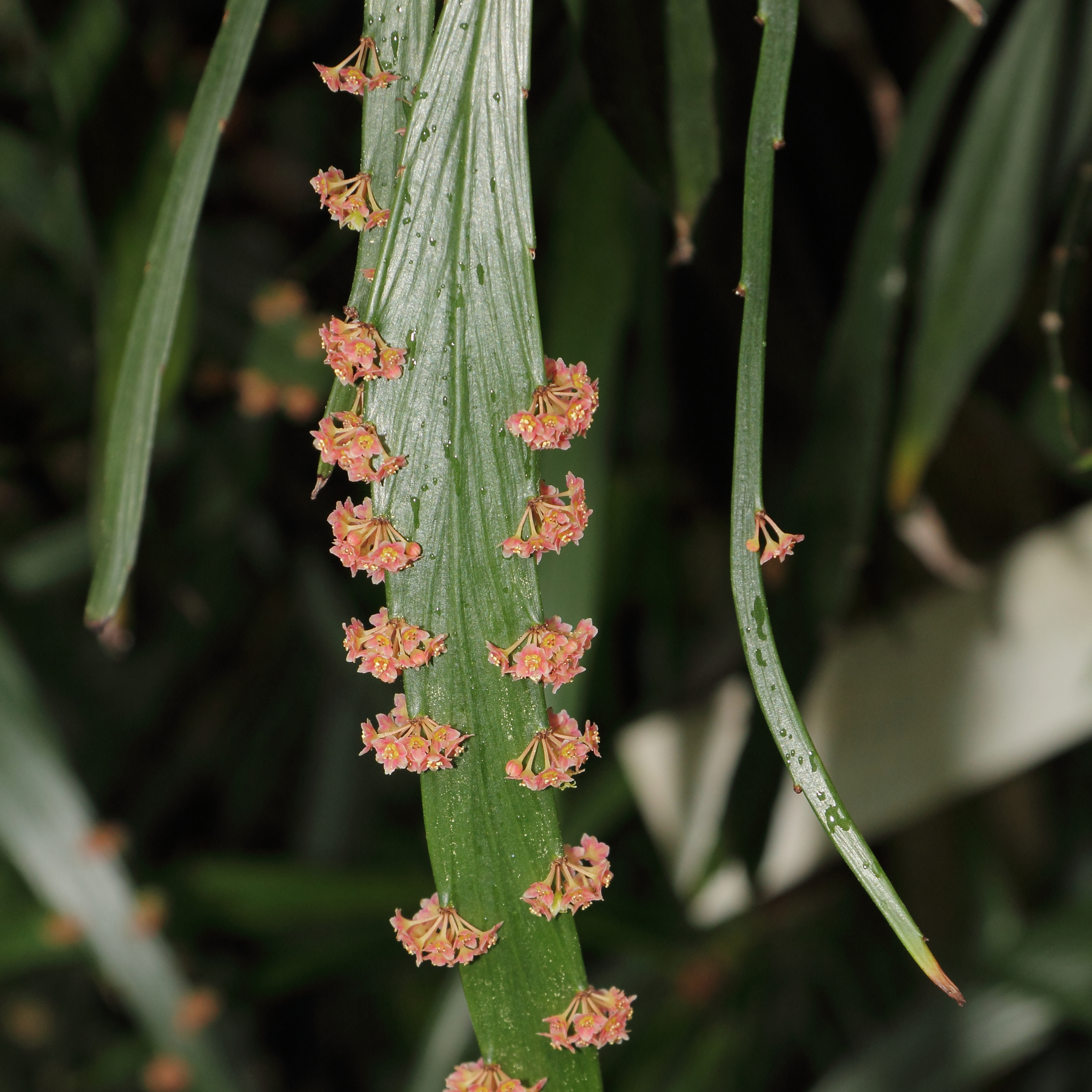
Flower clusters along the edge of the phylloclades/cladodes of Phyllanthus angustifolius

Phylloclades and cladodes are flattened, photosynthetic shoots, which are usually considered to be modified branches. The two terms are used either differently or interchangeably by different authors. Phyllocladus, a genus of conifer, is named after these structures. Phylloclades/cladodes have been identified in fossils dating from as early as the Permian.

== Definition and morphology ==
The term "phylloclade" is from the Neo-Latin phyllocladium, itself derived from Greek phyllo, leaf, and klados, branch.

Definitions of the terms "phylloclade" and "cladode" vary. All agree that they are flattened structures that are photosynthetic and resemble leaf-like branches. In one definition, phylloclades are a subset of cladodes, namely those that greatly resemble or perform the function of leaves, as in Butcher's broom (Ruscus aculeatus) as well as Phyllanthus and some Asparagus species.

By an alternative definition, cladodes are distinguished by their limited growth and that they involve only one or two internodes. By this definition, some of the most leaf-like structures are cladodes, rather than phylloclades. By that definition, Phyllanthus has phylloclades, but Ruscus and Asparagus have cladodes.

Another definition uses "phylloclade" to refer a portion of a leaf-like stem or branch with multiple nodes and internodes, and "cladode" for a single internode of a phylloclade.

Although phylloclades are usually interpreted as modified branches, developmental studies have shown that they are intermediate between leaves and branches as their name indicates. Molecular genetic investigations have confirmed these findings. For example, Hirayama et al. (2007) showed that the phylloclade of Ruscus aculeatus "is not homologous to either the shoot or the leaf, but that it has a double organ identity," which means that it combines shoot and leaf processes.

== Similar structures ==
- Aristate leaves end in a stiff point that may continue the primary leaf vein; this can resemble the stem end of a phylloclade/cladode.
- Epiphylly: flowers and fruit develop "on a leaf". A stem and a leaf are merged with one another. Examples include Monophyllaea in family Gesneriaceae and Helwingia in Helwingiaceae.

== Illustrations ==
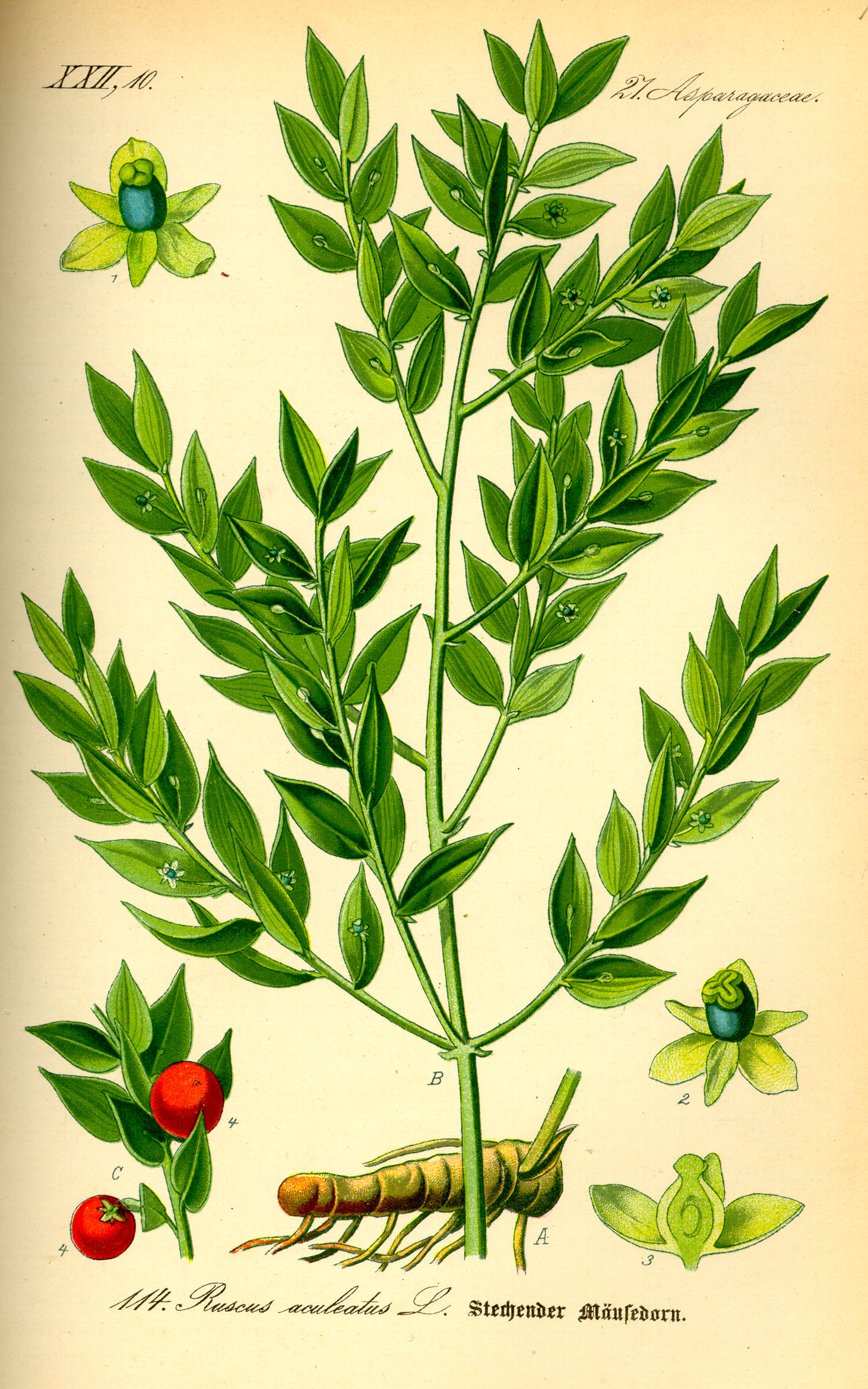
Botanical illustration of Ruscus aculeatus showing leaf-like phylloclades/cladodes

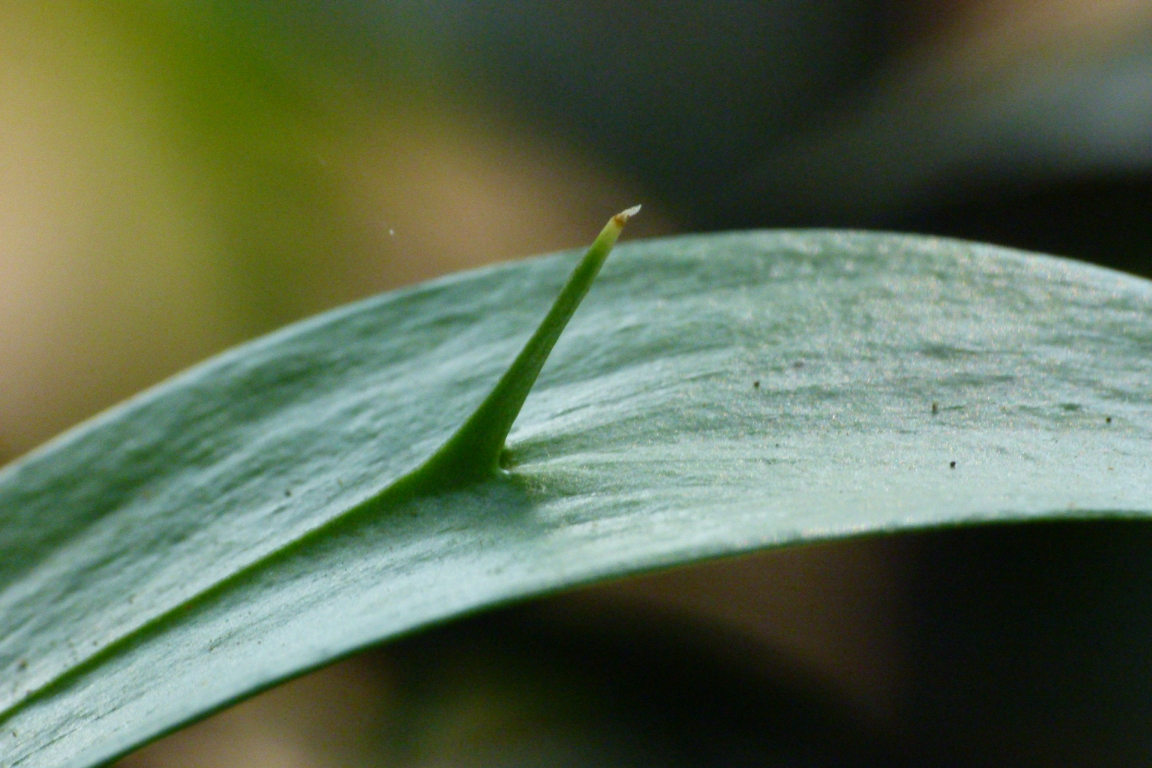
Phylloclade/cladode of Ruscus sp. showing the spine formed by the stem axis

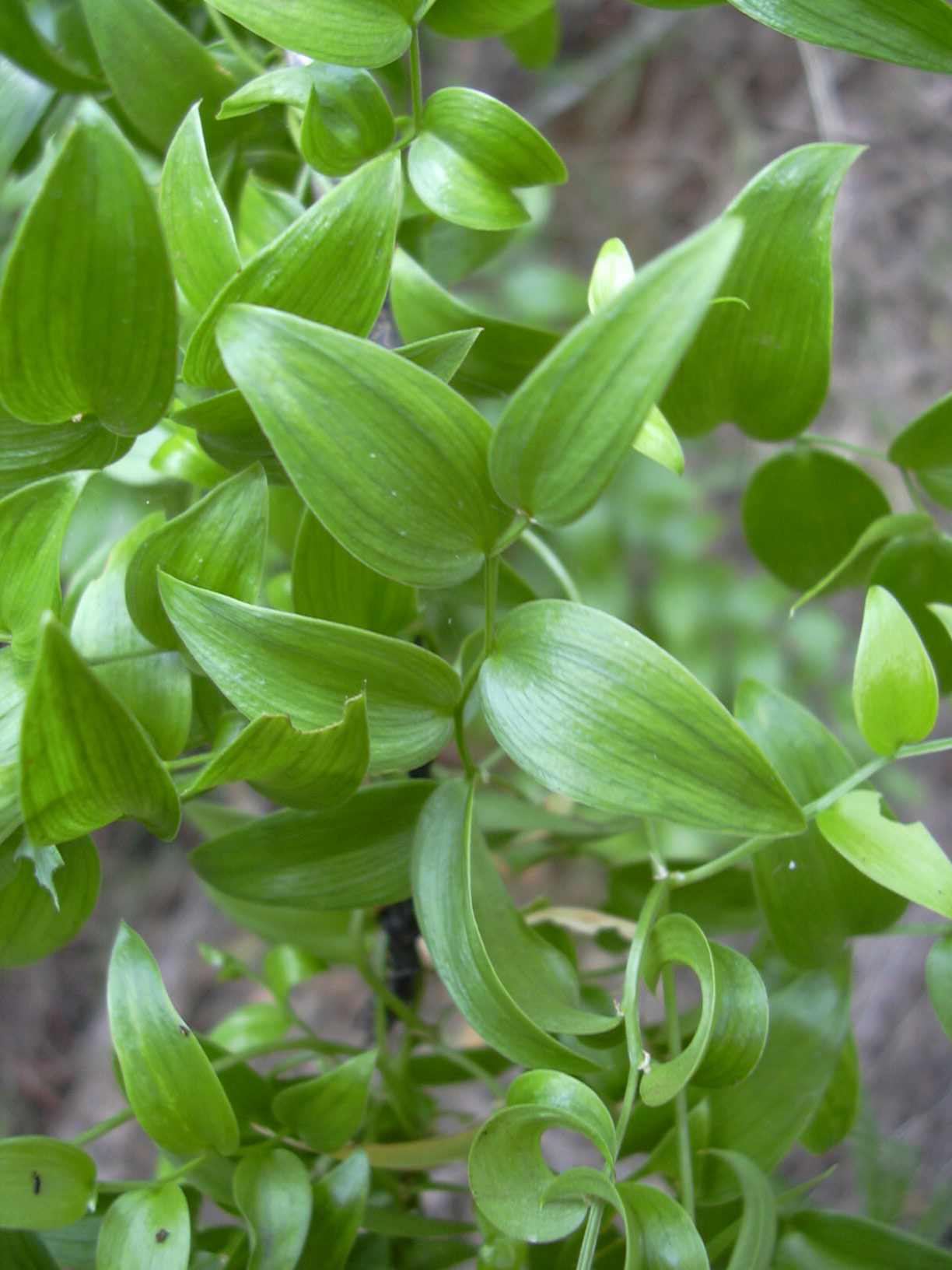
Leaf-like cladodes/phylloclades of Asparagus asparagoides

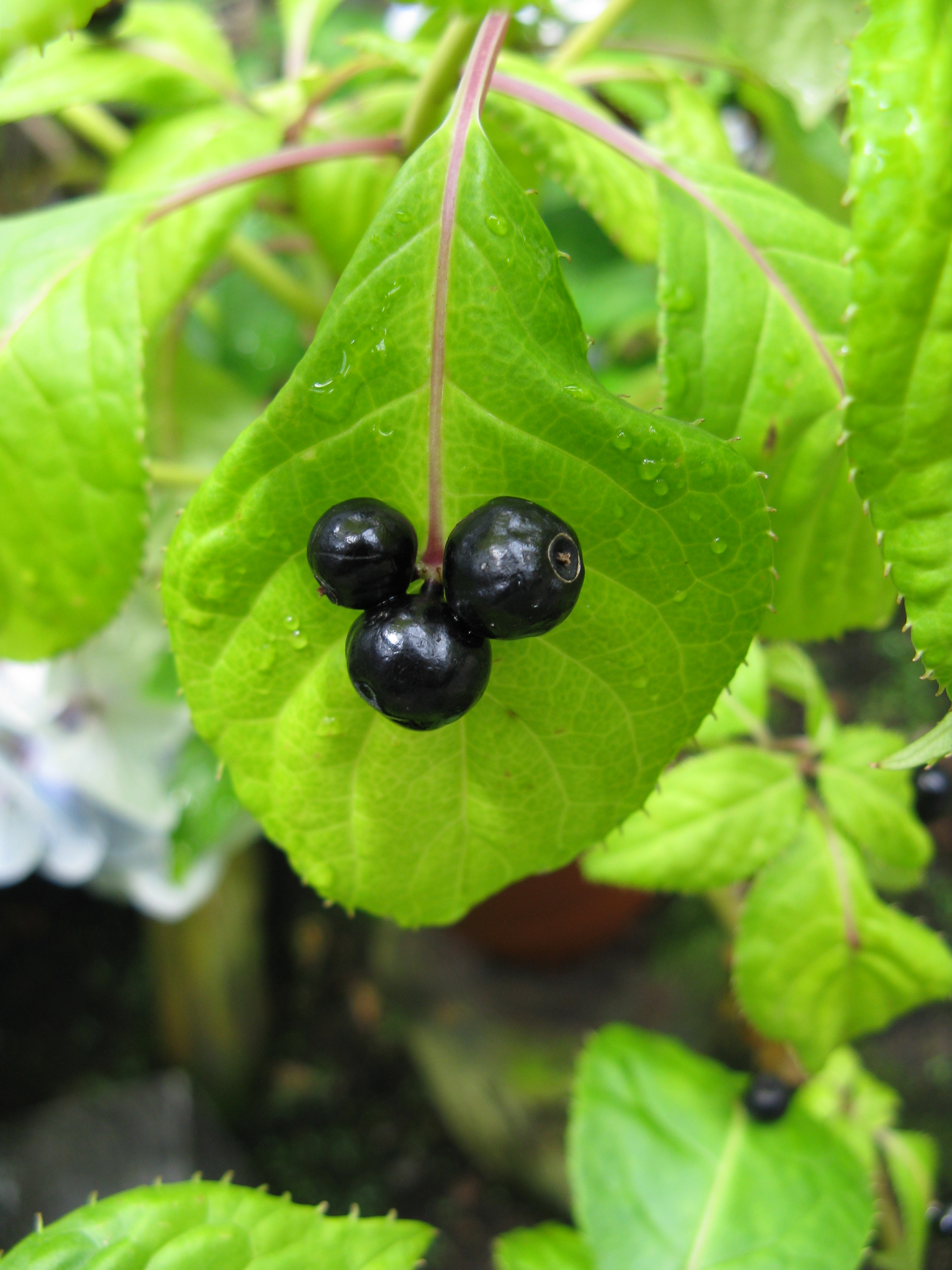
Epiphylly in Helwingia japonica for comparison
