= James Henderson Ross =

Australian botanist

James Henderson Ross (born 1941) is an Australian botanist.
