= Tasmanian temperate forests =

Ecoregion in Tasmania, Australia

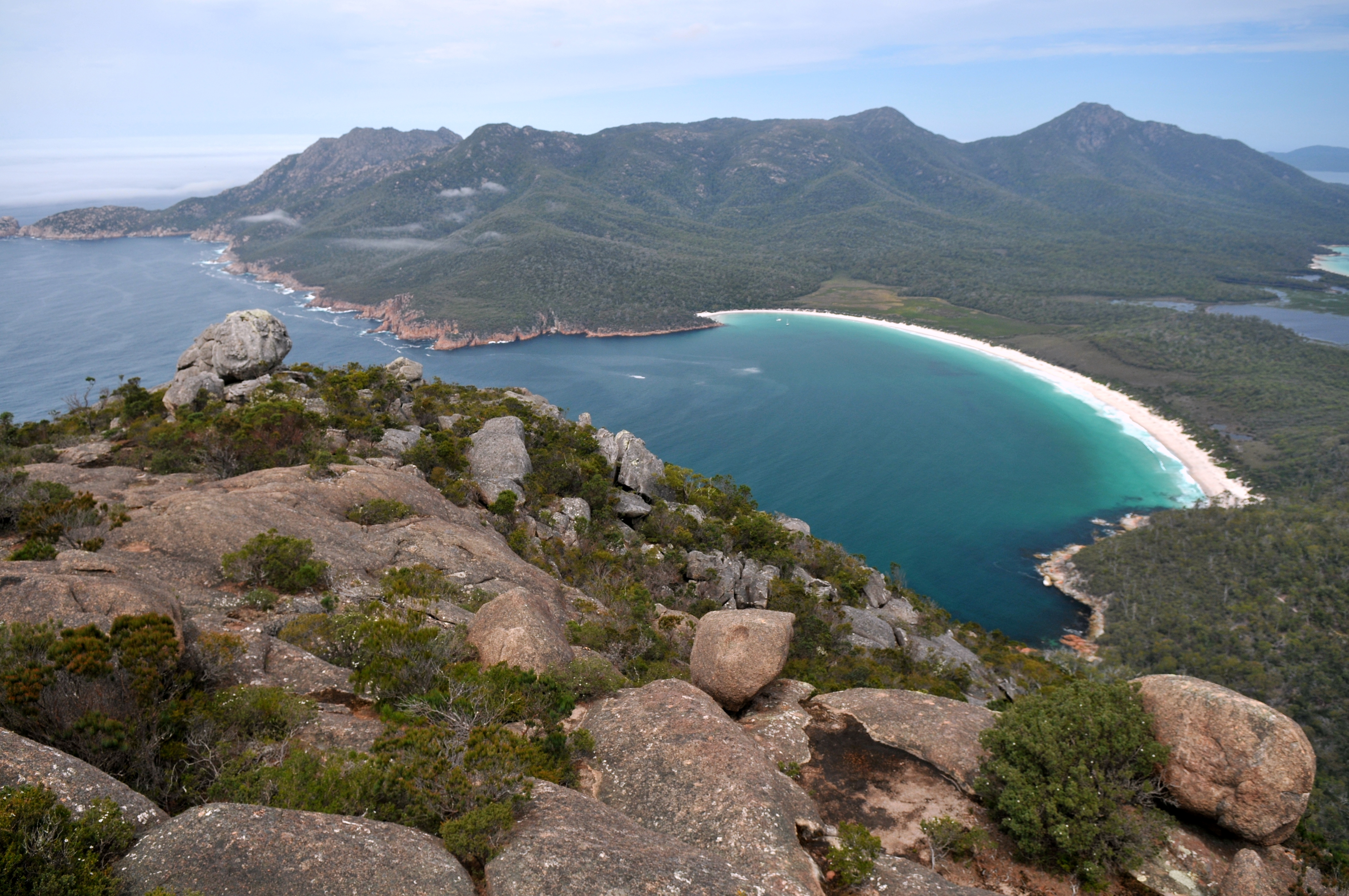
- Wineglass Bay, Freycinet National Park

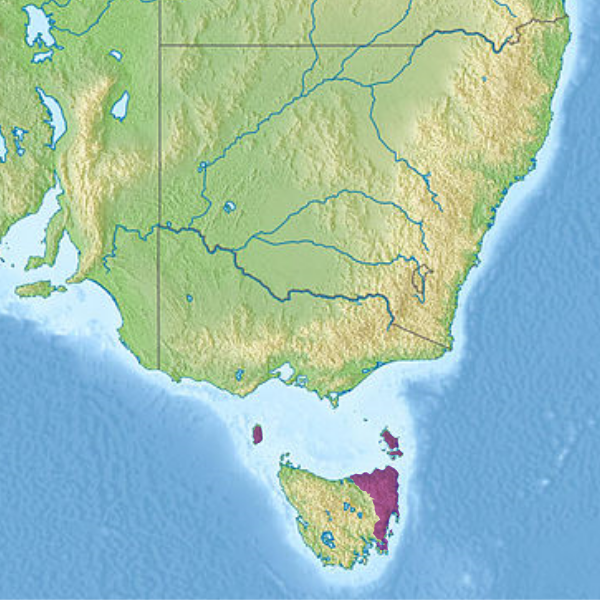
- Ecoregion territory (in purple)

Ecology
- Realm: Australasian
- Biome: temperate broadleaf and mixed forests
- Borders: Tasmanian Central Highland forests; Tasmanian temperate rain forests; Lowland Native Grasslands of Tasmania

Geography
- Area: 18,252 km^{2} (7,047 sq mi)
- Country: Australia
- State: Tasmania
- Coordinates: 41.2°S 147.7°E

Conservation
- Conservation status: Critical/endangered
- Protected: 4,056 km^{2} (22.22%)

The Tasmanian temperate forests is a temperate broadleaf and mixed forests ecoregion in Australia. The ecoregion occupies the eastern portion of the island of Tasmania, which lies south of the Australian mainland.

== Geography ==
The ecoregion occupies the eastern portion of Tasmania, as well as islands in the Bass Strait separating Tasmania from Australia – the Furneaux Group of islands off Tasmania's northeast coast, and King Island northwest of Tasmania.

== Climate ==
The ecoregion has a temperate climate. It is located on the drier eastern side of Tasmania, and average annual rainfall varies from 400 to 1,000 mm (16 to 39 in). Rainfall is variable from year to year and month to month, with no pronounced seasonal minimum. Rain generally falls in light showers, with the heaviest rainfall during the spring or autumn.

== Flora ==
Plant communities in the ecoregion include dry sclerophyll eucalypt forest, wet sclerophyll eucalypt forest, Allocasuarina-Callitris woodland, rainforest, grassland, and heath. Fire shaped the plant communities in eastern Tasmania. For thousands of years, the Aboriginal Tasmanians deliberately set regular fires, which transformed much of the landscape into open savanna and woodland of fire-adapted plants dominated by species of Eucalyptus. Settlers from Europe started arriving in the 18th century, and mostly displaced the Aboriginal Tasmanians. These settlers ceased the regular burning of the landscape, and many of the open savannas and woodlands grew into shrubby forests. European settlers also altered the landscape by grazing livestock, logging forests for timber, and establishing forestry plantations of exotic trees.

The dry eucalypt forests have an open canopy. Peppermint eucalypts, including Eucalyptus amygdalina, Eucalyptus pulchella, and Eucalyptus viminalis, are the predominant trees, growing more than 5 meters in height. There is an understorey of xerophytic shrubs and small trees, including species of Acacia, Allocasuarina, and Exocarpos.

Wet eucalypt forest is found on the higher slopes of Ben Lomond and the wetter areas of King Island. Eucalyptus globulus, Eucalyptus brookeriana, and Eucalyptus regnans are the predominant trees. There are also patches of rainforest in areas sheltered from fire, and alpine vegetation on mountain peaks.

Low, dry Allocasuarina-Callitris woodlands are found on the Furneaux Group and along the east coast of Tasmania. These woodlands are sensitive to fire disturbance. Allocasuarina verticillata is predominant, sometimes forming monospecific stands, and sometimes forming woodlands with Callitris or with Eucalyptus viminalis and E. globulus. Callitris oblonga is low shrubby tree found in Tasmania's dry woodlands. Callitris rhomboidea grows in fire-protected sites on Tasmania and the Furneaux Group, where it can grow up to 30 metres high.

Prior to European settlement, Bass Strait islands were mostly covered with dry sclerophyll woodland, wet and dry forests, and heath. Wet sclerophyll forests with some rainforest species were found in wetter areas of King Island, but these forests have mostly been destroyed. Allocasuarina-Callitris woodlands occurred in drier areas of the Furneaux Group. Many of the smaller islands are now covered in tussock grasslands of Poa poiformis.

== Fauna ==
Tasmania and the Bass Strait islands were connected to Australia during the ice ages when sea levels were lower, and shared a marsupial mammal fauna. The largest carnivores were the thylacine (Thylacinus cynocephalus), which was hunted to extinction by the early 20th century, and the Tasmanian devil (Sarcophilus harrisii). Both the thylacine and the Tasmanian devil were once widespread on mainland Australia, but went extinct there prior to European colonization. The dingo (Canis lupus dingo), brought to Australia by Aboriginals, and may have out-competed the marsupial predators there, but dingoes were never introduced to Tasmania.

Larger herbivores include the red-necked wallaby (Macropus rufogriseus), eastern grey kangaroo (Macropus giganteus), the Tasmanian subspecies of common wombat (Vombatus ursinus tasmaniensis), and the Flinders Island wombat (V. u. ursinus). The short-beaked echidna (Tachyglossus aculeatus) prefers sclerophyll forests and heaths. The platypus (Ornithorhynchus anatimus) lives in freshwater habitats across Tasmania and on King Island. Other mammals include the long-nosed potoroo (Potorous tridactylus), Tasmanian bettong (Bettongia gaimardi), Tasmanian pygmy possum (Cercartetus lepidus), eastern barred bandicoot (Perameles gunnii), tiger quoll (Dasyurus maculatus), and eastern quoll (D. viverrinus).

Many native birds are limited to Tasmania and the Bass Strait islands, including the forty-spotted pardalote (Pardalotus quadragintus), Tasmanian native hen (Gallinula mortierii), black-headed honeyeater (Melithreptus affinis), yellow wattlebird (Anthochaera paradoxa), green rosella (Platycercus caledonicus), Tasmanian scrubwren (Sericornis humilis), and yellow-throated honeyeater (Nesoptilotis flavicollis). The swift parrot (Lathamus discolor) breeds in Tasmania and ranges into southeastern Australia. The two native subspecies of emu, Tasmanian emu (Dromaius novaehollandiae diemenensis) and King Island emu (Dromaius novaehollandiae minor), were hunted to extinction.

There are about ten native species of lizards, including the mountain dragon (Rankinia diemensis) and the endemic Rawlinson's window-eyed skink (Pseudemoia rawlinsoni). The two endemic amphibians are the Tasmanian tree frog (Litoria burrowsi) and Tasmanian froglet (Crinia tasmaniensis).

== Protected areas ==
Protected areas include Ben Lomond National Park (181.9 km^{2}), Mount William National Park (184.39 km^{2}), Douglas-Apsley National Park (160.8 km^{2}), Freycinet National Park (169 km^{2}), Maria Island National Park (115 km^{2}), Lavinia State Reserve (78.8 km^{2}), Lime Bay State Reserve (15.1 km^{2}), Logan Lagoon Conservation Area (48.7 km^{2}), Mount Barrow State Reserve (15.8 km^{2}), St. Patricks Head State Reserve (13.2 km^{2}), and Moulting Lagoon Game Reserve (48 km^{2}). Moulting Lagoon (45.2 km^{2}) and Logan Lagoon (22.6 km^{2}) are also Ramsar wetlands of international importance.
