= Joseph Hugues Boissieu La Martinière =

Joseph Hugues Boissieu (de) La Martinière, also called Joseph La Martinière (1758, Saint-Marcellin, Isère - 1788, Vanikoro, Solomon Islands) was a French doctor of medicine and botanist and biologist. He disappeared in the Pacific whilst a member of the La Pérouse expedition.

== Life ==
Joseph Boissieu (de) La Martinière was from the Boissieu-Perrin family, an old middle-class family of the Dauphiné. His father Jean-Joseph Boissieu was a doctor of medicine attached to the faculty of the University of Montpellier who served a term as consul at Saint-Marcellin. The son Joseph was trained at Montpellier.

As a member of the Lapérouse expedition, Joseph escaped death at the hands of natives in the islands of Samoa in December 1787, by swimming to a boat, without losing the plant specimens he held above water in one hand. In the course of the voyage La Martinière sent correspondence and interim reports back to France, one cache that was carried overland from Russian Asia in 1787, and another that was conveyed back from Australia by the British merchant ship ‘Alexander’ in 1788; the finds included newly discovered helminths, crustaceans and the first copepod identified in the Pacific Ocean. In 1788, the two ships of the expedition foundered at Vanikoro in the Solomon Islands and were lost.

His brother Pierre Joseph Didier de Boissieu (fr) (1754 - 1812) was a deputy to the National Convention who did not vote for the King's death.

== Namesakes ==
=== Places ===
Two French streets bear his name:

- rue La Martinière, at Saint-Marcellin (Isère)
- rue Joseph de La Martinière, in the new quartier de la Rouvière Longue at Murviel-lès-Montpellier

=== Botany ===
Two flowering plants in the genus Bossiaea commemorate his name in Latinised form:

- Bossiaea heterophylla
- Bossiaea prostrata

=== Zoology ===
A fish parasite in the Capsalidae family carries his name:

- Capsala martinierei (Bosc), 1811).
