= Tasmanian Central Highland forests =

Terrestrial ecoregion in Tasmania, Australia

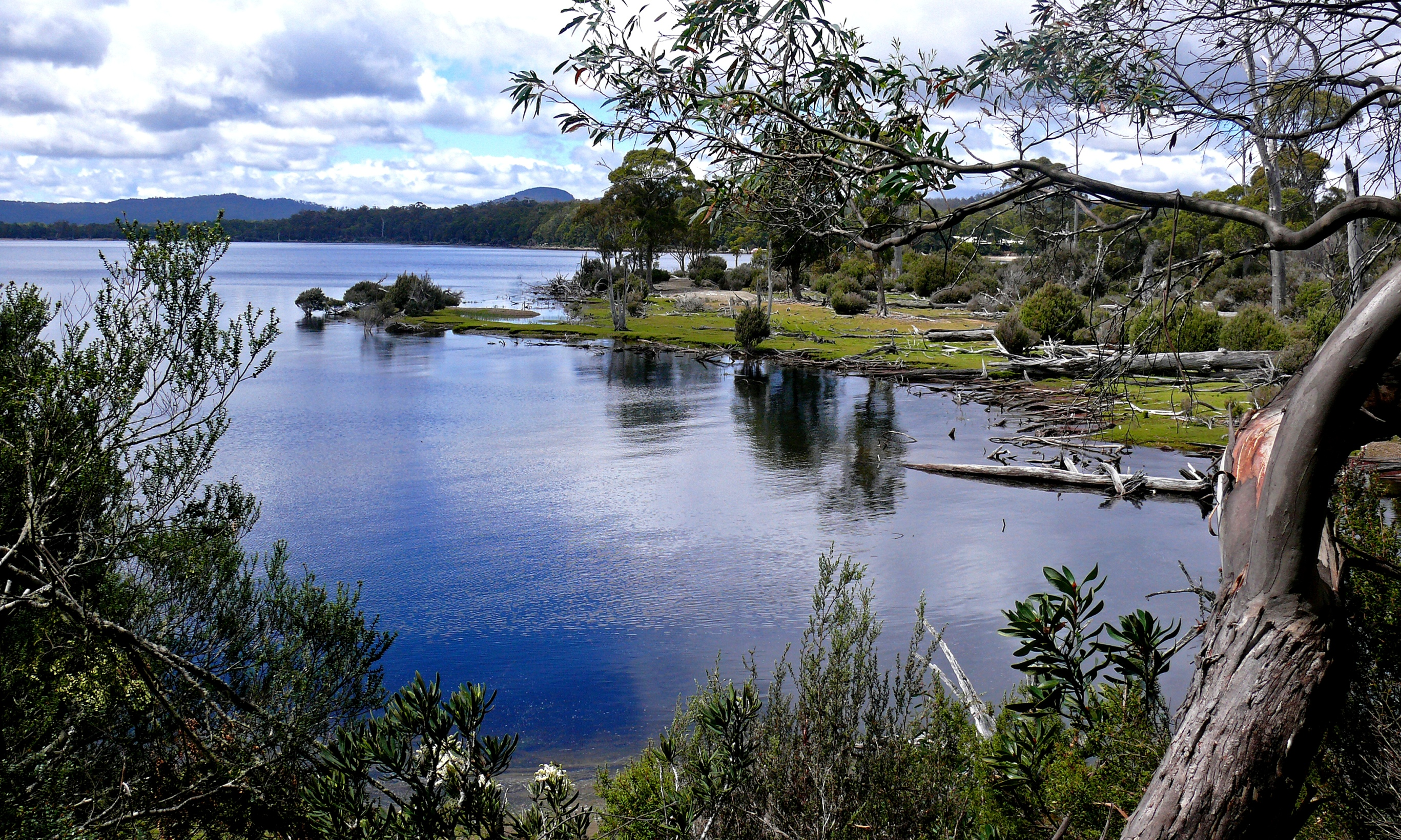
- Lake St Clair (Tasmania)

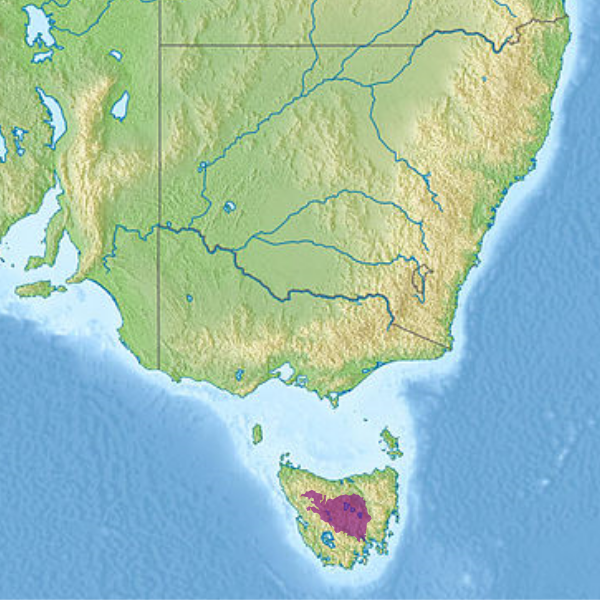
- Map of the Tasmanian Central Highland forests

Ecology
- Realm: Australasian
- Biome: temperate broadleaf and mixed forests
- Borders: Tasmanian temperate forests; Tasmanian temperate rain forests; Lowland Native Grasslands of Tasmania

Geography
- Area: 18,743 km^{2} (7,237 sq mi)
- Country: Australia
- State: Tasmania
- Coordinates: 41.9°S 146.67°E

Conservation
- Conservation status: Vulnerable
- Protected: 6,032 km² (32.18%)

The Tasmanian Central Highland forests is a temperate broadleaf and mixed forests ecoregion in Australia. It covers Tasmania's Central Highlands region.

== Geography ==
The Tasmanian Central Highland forests covers the Central Highlands, also known as the Central Plateau, of Tasmania. It is bounded on the west, northwest, and southwest by the humid Tasmanian temperate rain forests ecoregion, and on the northeast, east, and southeast by the drier Tasmanian temperate forests.

Portions of the plateau were glaciated during the ice ages. Glaciers carved many depressions in the landscape, including Lake St. Clair and many smaller lakes and tarns.

== Climate ==
The ecoregion has a temperate climate. It is Tasmania's coldest region, and temperatures often fall to or below freezing during the three to four winter months, often overnight. Snowfall is most common in the spring. Average annual precipitation is highest in the west, averaging up to 2,000 mm, and is lowest in the east in the rain shadow of the Central Plateau.

== Flora ==
The main plant communities are wet and dry sclerophyll forests and woodlands at lower elevations, with alpine coniferous forest, montane grasslands, montane shrublands, and alpine plant communities at higher elevations. Rainforest species can extend up to the treeline, generally as understorey plants in sclerophyll or conifer forests.

Dry sclerophyll forest, dominated by Eucalyptus coccifera and Eucalyptus vernicosa, is most common in the southeast. They grow five metres or more in height at lower elevations, and as low trees or shrubs up to 1,200 metres elevation. They can form open woodlands with a grassy understorey, or can be interspersed with areas of grassland.

Higher-elevation conifer forests include pencil pine (Athrotaxis cupressoides), King Billy pine (Athrotaxis selaginoides), and Athrotaxis laxifolia, with a shrub layer that includes the dwarf conifers Diselma archeri and Pherosphaera hookeriana (also known as Microstrobos niphophilus).

Shrub communities are also found at high elevation, with species of Proteaceae, Epacridaceae, Myrtaceae, and some conifers.

Montane grasslands of Poa labillardierei and Poa gunnii occur above 600 metres elevation, frequently on dolerite substrates.

Alpine shrublands and heaths are found above 1,000 metres elevation, and occasionally at lower elevations where microclimates and soils permit. Typical alpine vegetation includes shrubs lower than 2 metres, along with grasses, cushion plants, mosses, and bog plants. Low dense thickets of Nothofagus cunninghamii and Nothofagus gunnii extend up to 1,400 metres elevation. Areas of bog, sedgeland, and bolster moor are found in poorly-drained areas, and where bolster plants impede drainage.

== Fauna ==
Native mammals include the Tasmanian devil (Sacrophilus harrisii), eastern barred bandicoot (Perameles gunnii), and eastern quoll (Dasyurus viverrinus).

Native birds include the Tasmanian subspecies of wedge-tailed eagle (Aquila audax fleayi), the Tasmanian native hen (Gallinula mortierii), Tasmanian thornbill (Acanthiza ewingii), and yellow wattlebird (Anthochaera paradoxa). The swift parrot (Lathamus discolor) is a seasonal visitor, which migrates in autumn to breed in the coastal dry eucalyptus woodlands further east.

The ecoregion is home to several viviparous skinks, including the mountain skink (Carinascincus orocryptus), southern grass tussock skink (Pseudemoia pagenstecheri), and glossy grass skink (Pseudemoia rawlinsoni).

== Protected areas ==
6,032 km^{2}, or 32.18%, of the ecoregion is in protected areas. They include Cradle Mountain-Lake St Clair National Park (1616.8 km^{2}), Walls of Jerusalem National Park, (518 km^{2}), Central Plateau Conservation Area (966.1 km^{2}), Princess River Conservation Area (86.4 km^{2}), Devils Gullet State Reserve (11.2 km^{2}), Meander Conservation Area (16.7 km^{2}), Black Bluff Nature Recreation Area (67 km^{2}), Deep Gully Regional Reserve (34 km^{2}), and Dove River Regional Reserve (24.2 km^{2}). The Tasmanian Wilderness World Heritage Area covers the western portion of the ecoregion and extends southwest into the Tasmanian temperate rain forests ecoregion.
