= Lowland Native Grasslands of Tasmania =

Ecoregion in Tasmania

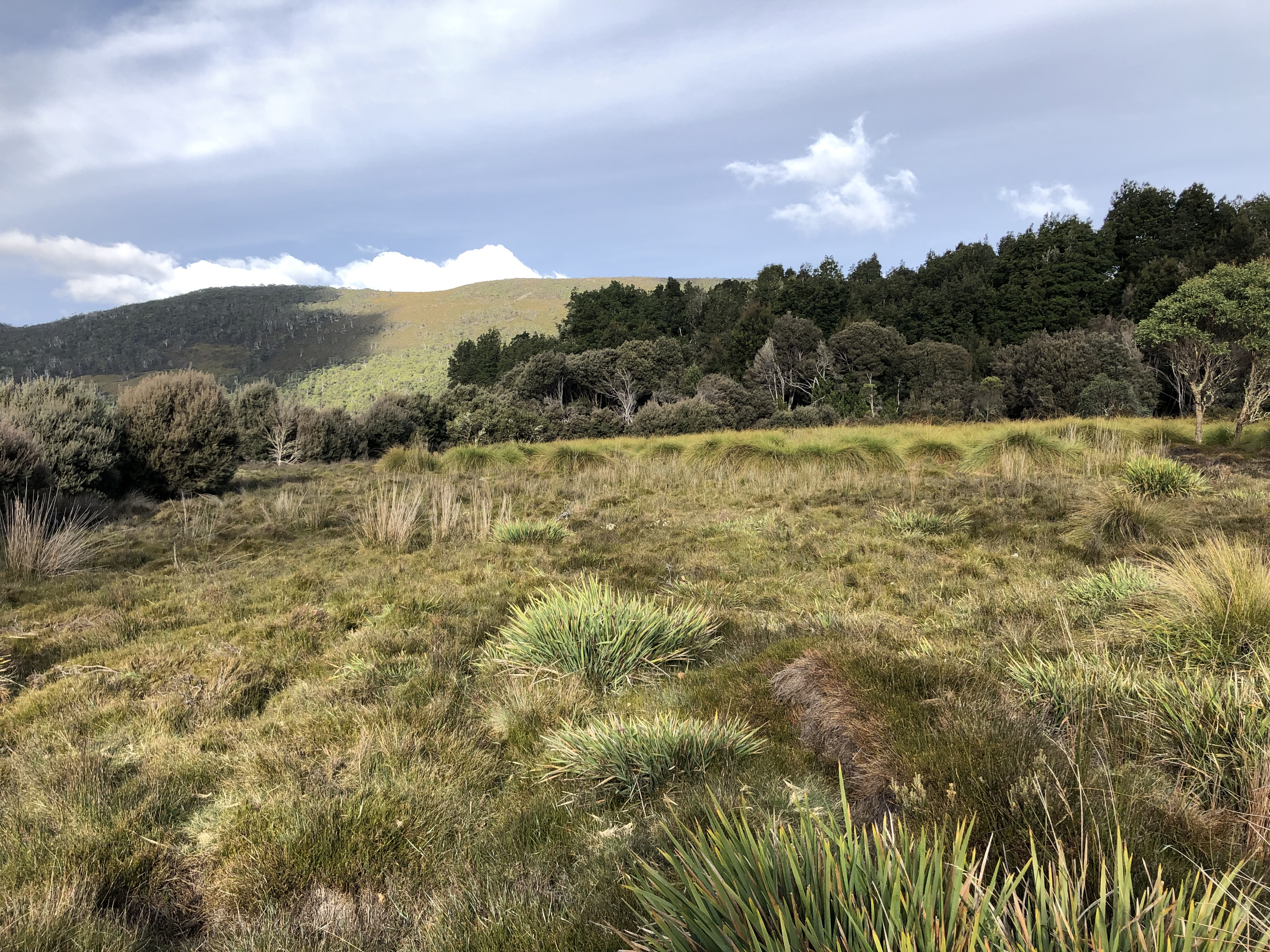

Ecology
- Realm: Australasia
- Biome: Temperate grasslands, savannas, and shrublands

Geography
- Area: 19 km^{2} (7.3 sq mi)
- Country: Australia
- Elevation: 10–600 metres (33–1,969 ft)
- Coordinates: 42°12′S 147°00′E
- Geology: Basalt, dolerite
- Climate type: Oceanic climate (Cfb)
- Soil types: Sand or alluvial

The Lowland Native Grasslands of Tasmania are a temperate grassland situated in the eastern portion of Tasmania, Australia. Listed as a critically endangered ecological community listed under the national environment law, they are dominated by kangaroo grass, velvet tussock grass and/or silver tussock grass.

== Geography ==
The vegetation community occurs as small divided remnants below 600m on valley flats in the Tasmanian Midlands, Derwent Valley, east coast and southeast Tasmania, though by 2009 more than 83% has been lost since European settlement. A few decentralized areas of the community is also present in northwest Tasmania, Ben Lomond, Northern Slopes, King, Flinders, Central Highlands, Southern Ranges, Flinders and Cape Barren Island in Bass Strait, on heavy, mineralized and fertile soils.

== Flora ==
The community is by and large treeless and only 5% features trees, though Eucalyptus ovata, Eucalyptus viminalis and Eucalyptus pauciflora may occur when the zone is adjacent to grassy woodlands. Other scattered low-density trees include scattered, Eucalyptus rubida, Eucalyptus amygdalina, Acacia dealbata, Acacia mearnsii, Acacia melanoxylon, Allocasuarina spp., Bursaria spinosa and Dodonaea viscosa. Shrubs and forbs include Ptilotus spathulatus, Leucochrysum albicans, Tricoryne elatior, Dodonaea viscosa, Microlaena stipoides, Chrysocephalum apiculatum, Pimelea humilis, Bossiaea prostrata, Lissanthe strigosa and Astroloma humifusum.

== Fauna ==
Animals include Gallinula mortierii, Bettongia gaimardi, Potorous tridactylus, Aquila audax fleayi, Isoodon obesulus, Perameles gunnii, Vombatus ursinus and Tachyglossus aculeatus.
