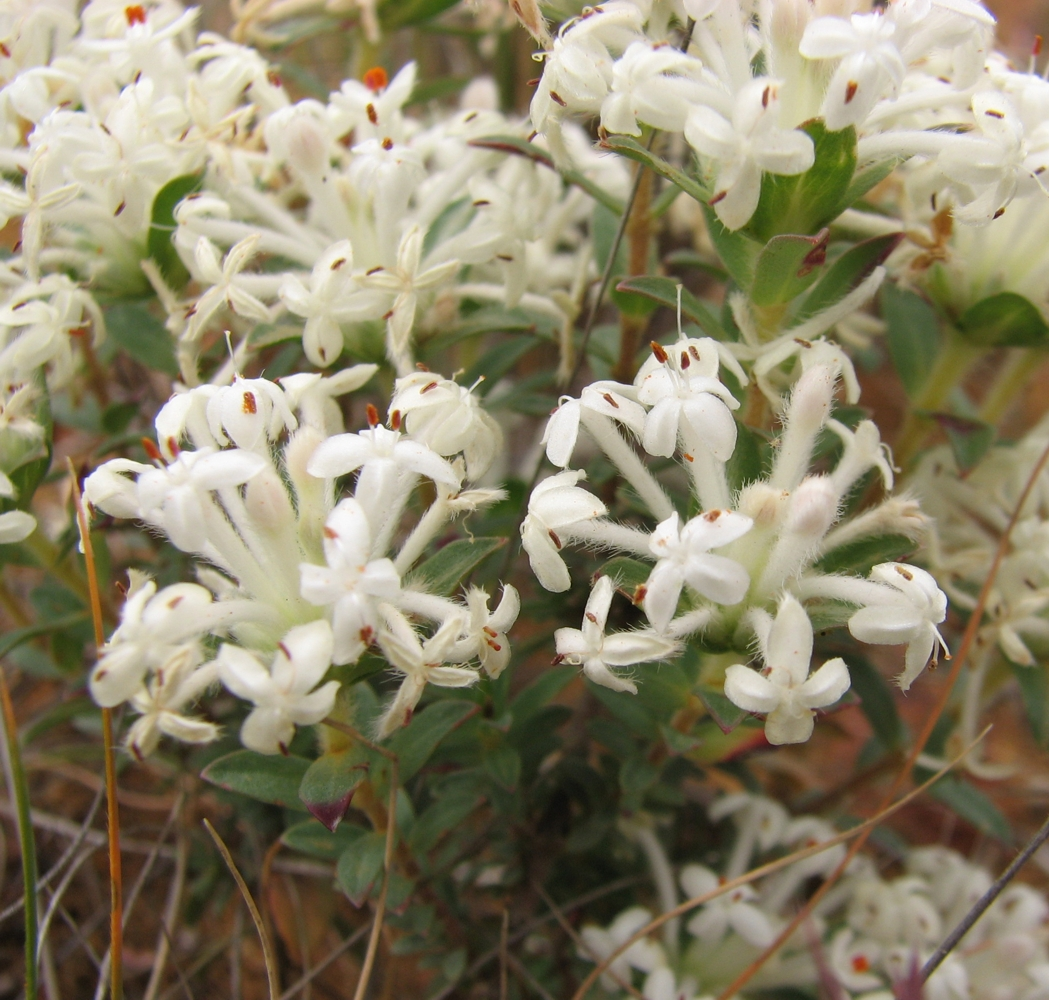

Scientific classification
- Kingdom: Plantae
- Clade: Tracheophytes
- Clade: Angiosperms
- Clade: Eudicots
- Clade: Rosids
- Order: Malvales
- Family: Thymelaeaceae
- Genus: Pimelea
- Species: P. humilis

Binomial name
- Pimelea humilis R.Br.

Synonyms
- Banksia humilis (R.Br.) Kuntze; Pimelea esulifolia Gand.; Pimelea humilis R.Br. var. humilis; Pimelea humilis var. myrtifolia (Schltdl.) Meisn.; Pimelea myrtifolia Schltdl.; Pimelea tasmanica Gand.

= Pimelea humilis =

Common riceflower

Species of plant

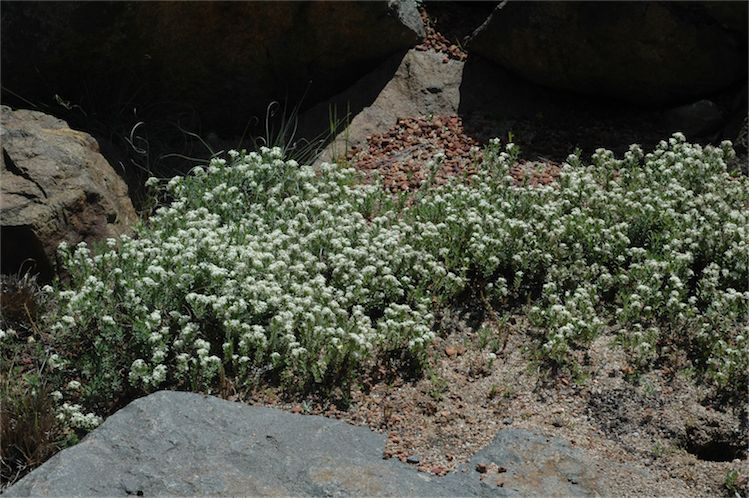
Habit in the Australian National Botanic Gardens

Pimelea humilis, also known as common riceflower or dwarf riceflower, is a species of flowering plant in the family Thymelaeaceae and is endemic to south-eastern Australia. It is an erect or scrambling shrub with hairy stems, elliptic to lance-shaped leaves and heads of 12 to 52 of creamy-white, bisexual or female flowers.

== Description ==
Pimelea humilis is an erect or scrambling that typically grows to a height of 5–50 cm (2.0–19.7 in) and has densely hairy young stems. Its leaves are arranged in opposite pairs, narrowly elliptic to lance-shaped, mostly 5–16 mm (0.20–0.63 in) long, 1–9 mm (0.039–0.354 in) wide on a short petiole. The flowers are arranged in clusters of 12 to 52 on a peduncle 2–19 mm (0.079–0.748 in) long, surrounded by 4 or 6 egg-shaped involucral bracts 6–18 mm (0.24–0.71 in) long, 3–11 mm (0.12–0.43 in) wide and green with a yellow base. The flowers are creamy-white, the flower tube 8–15 mm (0.31–0.59 in) long, the sepals 1–5 mm (0.039–0.197 in) long, and the stamens shorter than the sepals. Flowering occurs from September to December and the fruit is green and about 4 mm (0.16 in) long.

Common riceflower is similar to P. linifolia but is smaller, softer and has hairy stems.

== Taxonomy ==
Pimelea humilis was first formally described by Robert Brown in Prodromus Florae Novae Hollandiae in 1810. The specific epithet (humilis) means "low" or "low-growing".

== Distribution and habitat ==
Common riceflower grows in heath, woodland, forest and grassland, often in sandy soil. It is widespread and common in Victoria, but less common in New South Wales, growing at Robertson and south of Eden. It also occurs east of the Mount Lofty Range in South Australia and in north-eastern Tasmania.
