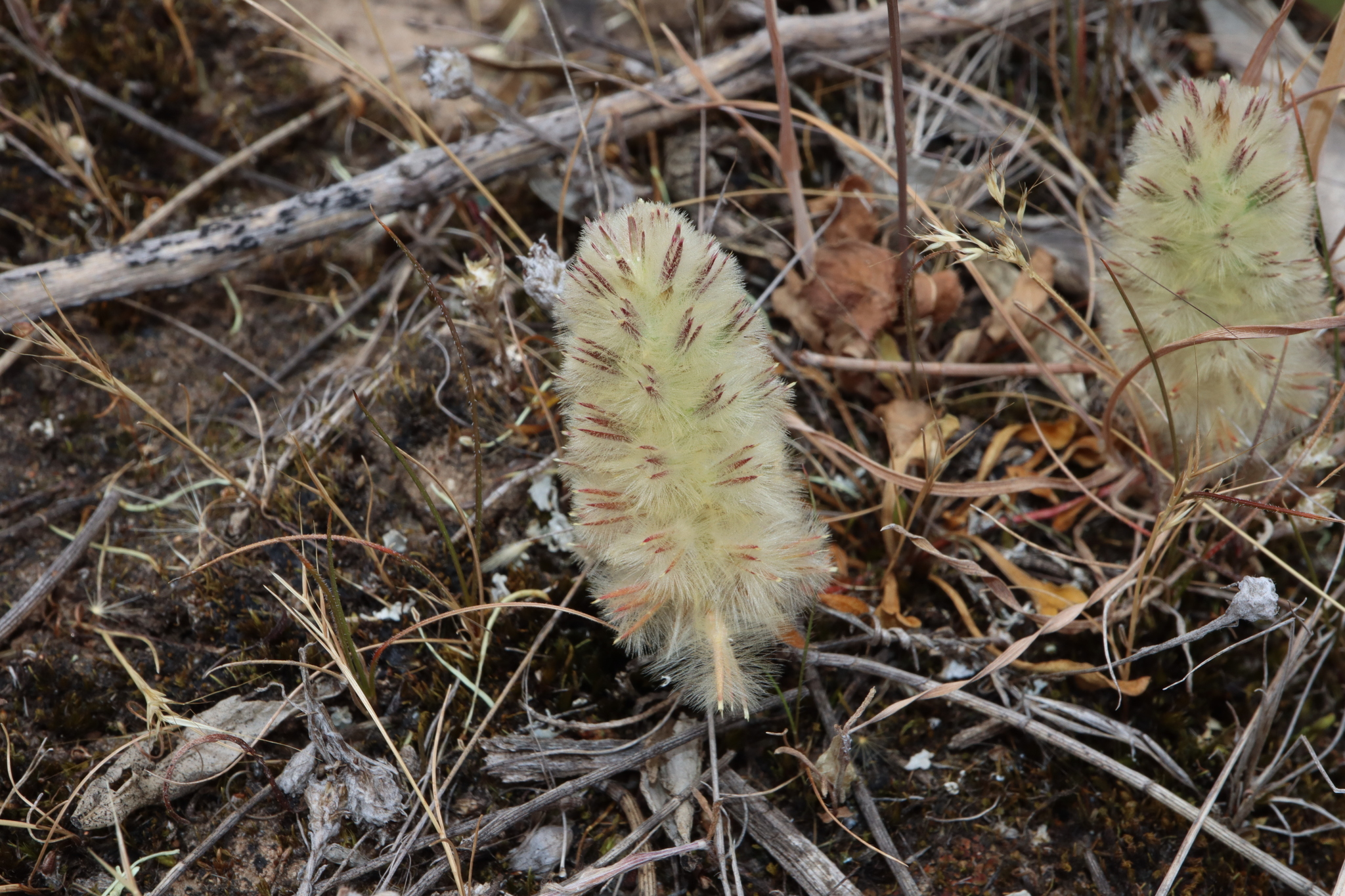
- Near Jacup

Scientific classification
- Kingdom: Plantae
- Clade: Embryophytes
- Clade: Tracheophytes
- Clade: Spermatophytes
- Clade: Angiosperms
- Clade: Eudicots
- Order: Caryophyllales
- Family: Amaranthaceae
- Genus: Ptilotus
- Species: P. spathulatus

Binomial name
- Ptilotus spathulatus (R.Br.) Poir.

Synonyms
- Ptilotus spathulatus f. angustatus Benl; Ptilotus spathulatus (R.Br.) Poir. f. spathulatus; Ptilotus spatulatus F.Muell. orth. var.; Trichinium mucronatum Nees; Trichinium spathulatum R.Br.

= Ptilotus spathulatus =

Species of herb

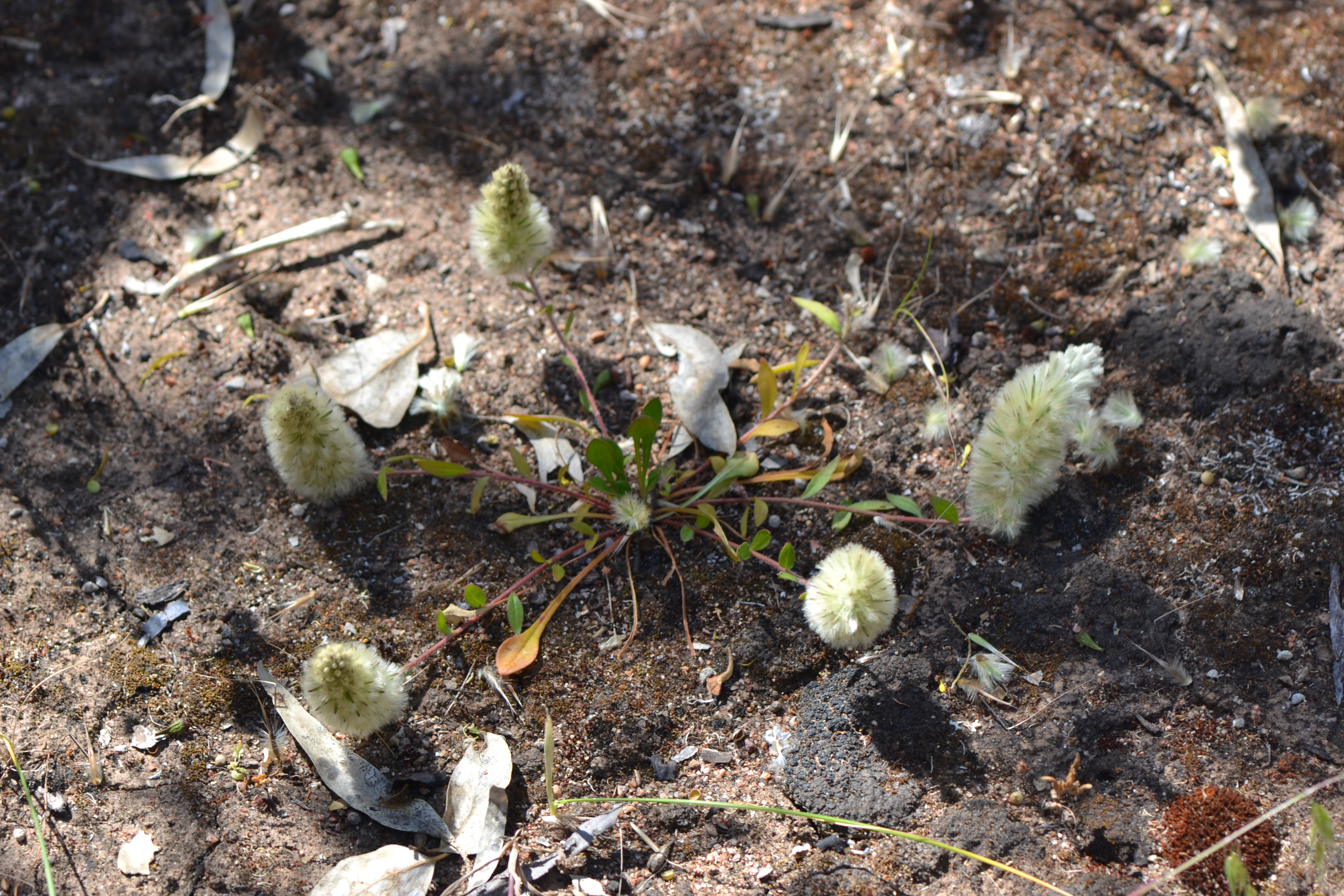
Habit

Ptilotus spathulatus, commonly known as pussytails, cats paws or possumtails, is a species of flowering plant in the Amaranthaceae family and is endemic to Australia. It is a perennial plant with a deep taproot and several prostrate, usually unbranched stems, spatula-shaped leaves at the base and egg-shaped or lance-shaped stem leaves, very dense spikes of cylindrical yellow-green flowers with three to five fertile stamens.

== Description ==
Ptilotus spathulatus is a perennial plant with a deep taproot and several prostrate or low-lying, often reddish, usually unbranched stems 50–200 mm (2.0–7.9 in) long and sparsely covered with soft hairs. The leaves at the base of the plant are spatula-shaped, up to 760 mm (30 in) long and 10 mm (0.39 in) wide, the stem leaves egg-shaped to lance-shaped but smaller. The flowers are yellowish green and arranged in cylindrical spikes 30–70 mm (1.2–2.8 in) long and 20–25 mm (0.79–0.98 in) in diameter on the ends of stems. The bracts are egg-shaped to lance-shaped about 8 mm (0.31 in) long and the bracteoles broadly egg-shaped, about as long as the bracts. The perianth is 9–12 mm (0.35–0.47 in) in diameter, the tepals free from each other densely covered with silky hairs on the outside and mostly glabrous on the inside. There are three to five fertile stamens, the ovary is subsessile and the style is attached to the side of the ovary. Flowering mainly occurs from August to January.

== Taxonomy ==
This species was first formally described in 1810 by Robert Brown who gave it the name Trichinium spathulatum in his Prodromus Florae Novae Hollandiae. In 1816, Jean Louis Marie Poiret transferred the species to Ptilotus as P. spathulatus. The specific epithet (spathulatus) means 'spoon-shaped', and refers to the leaves.

== Distribution and habitat ==
Ptilotus spathulatus grows in clay loam and sand over granite and laterite and is widespread in the south-west of Western Australia, the south of South Australia, New South Wales, Victoria and Tasmania.
