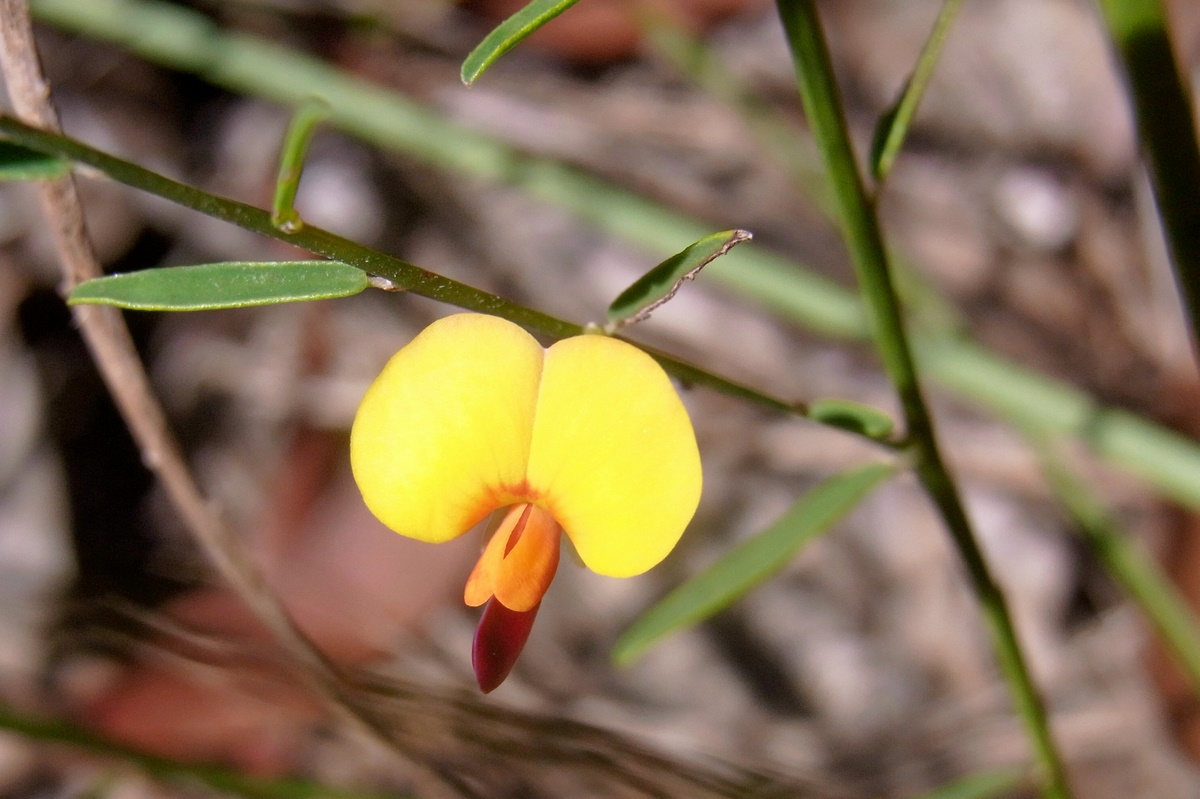
- Ku-ring-gai Chase National Park, Australia

Scientific classification
- Kingdom: Plantae
- Clade: Tracheophytes
- Clade: Angiosperms
- Clade: Eudicots
- Clade: Rosids
- Order: Fabales
- Family: Fabaceae
- Subfamily: Faboideae
- Genus: Bossiaea
- Species: B. heterophylla

Binomial name
- Bossiaea heterophylla Vent.
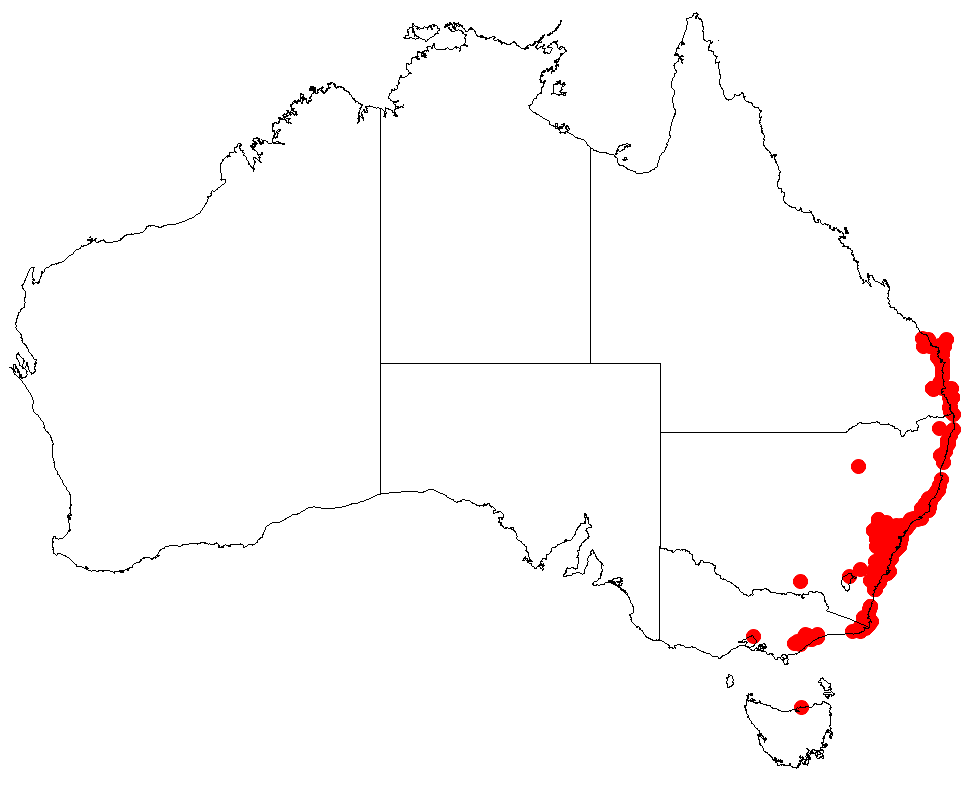
- Occurrence data from AVH

= Bossiaea heterophylla =

Variable bossiaea

Species of legume

Bossiaea heterophylla, commonly known as variable bossiaea, is a species of flowering plant in the family Fabaceae and is endemic to south-eastern Australia. It is a variable shrub with flattened stems, egg-shaped to linear leaves, and yellow and dark red flowers.

== Description ==
Bossiaea heterophylla is a shrub that typically grows to a height of up to about 3 m (9.8 ft) and has flattened, glaucous, more or less glabrous branches 1–3 mm (0.039–0.118 in) wide. The leaves are arranged in two rows along the stems, variably-shaped, linear to broadly egg-shaped, 10–30 mm (0.39–1.18 in) long and 1.5–12 mm (0.059–0.472 in) wide with triangular stipules up to 1 mm (0.039 in) long at the base. The flowers are 7–15 mm (0.28–0.59 in) long and arranged singly along the branches, each flower on a pedicel up to 5 mm (0.20 in) long with a few bracts up to 1.5 mm (0.059 in) long. The sepals are 4–6 mm (0.16–0.24 in) long with bracteoles up to 1.5 mm (0.059 in) long on the pedicel. The standard petal is yellow-orange with a red back and up to 15 mm (0.59 in) long, the wings 1.5–2.5 mm (0.059–0.098 in) wide and yellow sometimes flushed with pink and the keel is 3–4 mm (0.12–0.16 in) wide and dark red. Flowering occurs from April to June and the fruit is a flat pod 20–40 mm (0.79–1.57 in) long.

== Taxonomy ==
Bossiaea heterophylla was first formally described in 1800 by Étienne Pierre Ventenat in his book, Description des Plantes Nouvelles et peu connues, cultivées dans le Jardin de J.M. Cels, from specimens grown by Jacques Philippe Martin Cels, in turn grown from material collected from Botany Bay in 1792. The specific epithet (heterophylla) means "unequal-leaved".

== Distribution and habitat ==
Variable bossiaea grows in a variety of habitats, usually in sandy soils and occurs on the coast and nearby tablelands south from Bundaberg in Queensland, through New South Wales to Victoria as far west as Rosedale. It also occurs in two small populations in northern Tasmania.

== Conservation status ==
This bossiaea is listed as "endangered" in Tasmania under the Tasmanian Government Threatened Species Protection Act 1995.
