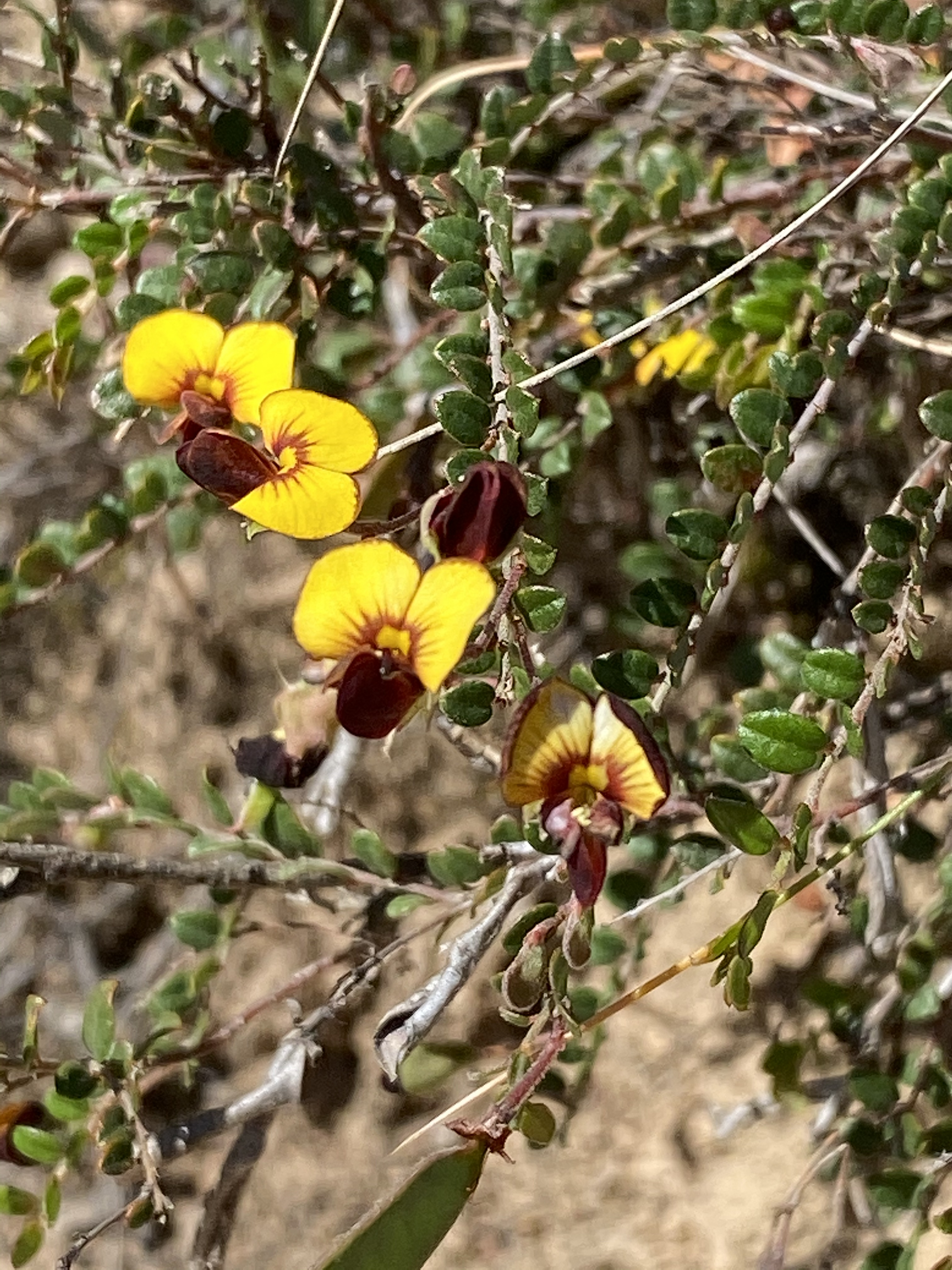
- Bossiaea prostrata near Taralga

Scientific classification
- Kingdom: Plantae
- Clade: Tracheophytes
- Clade: Angiosperms
- Clade: Eudicots
- Clade: Rosids
- Order: Fabales
- Family: Fabaceae
- Subfamily: Faboideae
- Genus: Bossiaea
- Species: B. prostrata

Binomial name
- Bossiaea prostrata R.Br.
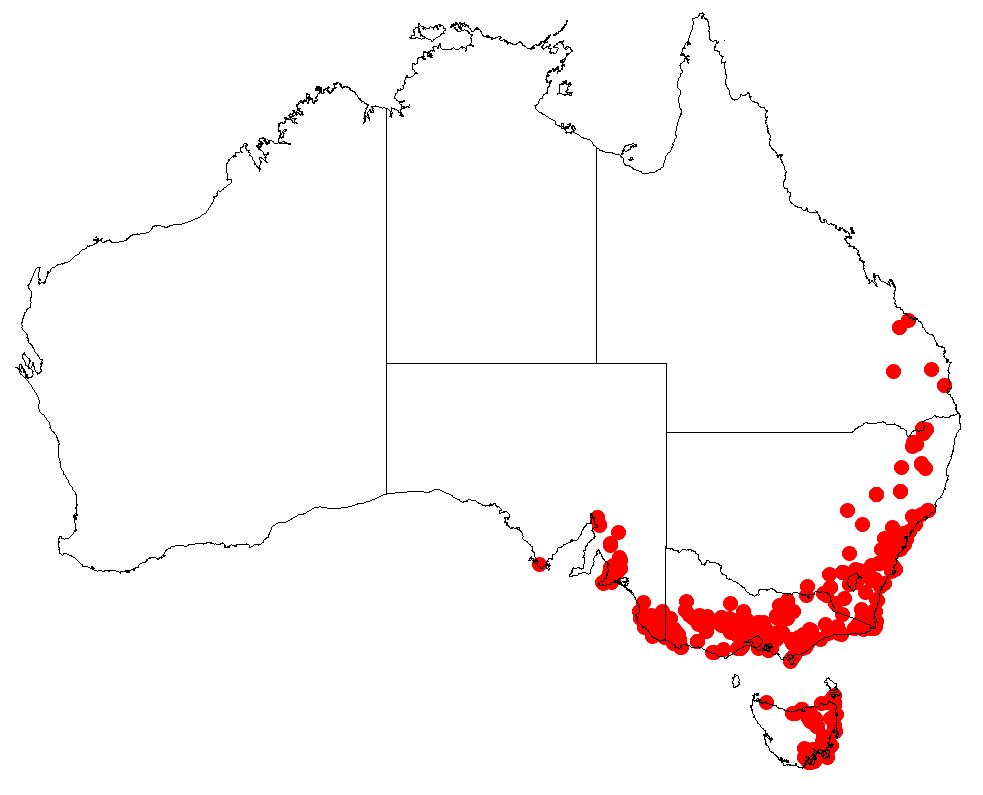
- Occurrence data from AVH

Synonyms
- Bossiaea humilis Meisn.; Bossiaea linnaeoides G.Don; Bossiaea nummularia Endl.

= Bossiaea prostrata =

Creeping bossiaea

Species of plant

Bossiaea prostrata, commonly known as creeping bossiaea, is a prostrate understory shrub in the pea family, Fabaceae. It is a widespread species with orange-yellow flowers, purple-brown keels and trailing branches.

== Description ==
Bossiaea prostrata is a shrub with a prostrate spreading, scrambling habit to 0.2 m (7.9 in) wide. The leaves are dark green on the upper side and paler on the underside, ovate to rounded or oblong, 3–15 mm (0.12–0.59 in) long, 2–10 mm (0.079–0.394 in) wide and have a petiole about 5 mm (0.20 in) long. The leaves are arranged alternately, simple, smooth or with sparse hairs, stipules narrow to egg-shaped, 1–2 mm (0.039–0.079 in) long. The stems are flattened toward the apex and either smooth or with short flattened or spreading hairs. The flowers are single or in pairs, 6–12 mm (0.24–0.47 in) long, have orange-yellow standards, that are pinkish brown on the back, and purple-brown keels. The pedicels 1–2 cm (0.39–0.79 in) long, bracts 1.5 mm (0.059 in) long. The seed pods are oblong in shape and between 1.5–3.2 cm (0.59–1.26 in) long. Flowering occurs between September and November in its native range. It is similar to the species Bossiaea buxifolia, but may be distinguished by its longer leaves, petioles and pedicels and more distant leaf spacing.

== Taxonomy and naming ==
Bossiaea prostrata was first formally described in 1812 by botanist Robert Brown and the description was published in Hortus Kewensis.The specific epithet (prostrata) is a Latin word meaning "down flat", "overthrown" or "laid low",

== Distribution and habitat ==
Creeping bossiaea occurs in South Australia, Victoria, Tasmania, New South Wales and Queensland in Australia. It grows in coastal heath, grassland and open-forest on a variety of soils including clay-shale, preferring wetter locations.
