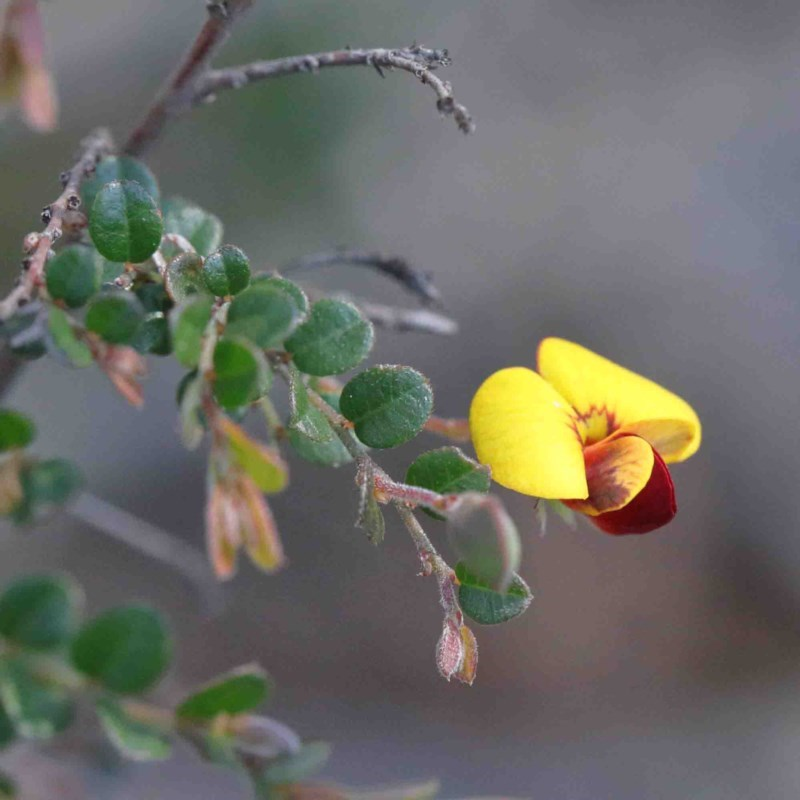
- Bossiaea buxifolia in O'Connor, A.C.T.

Scientific classification
- Kingdom: Plantae
- Clade: Tracheophytes
- Clade: Angiosperms
- Clade: Eudicots
- Clade: Rosids
- Order: Fabales
- Family: Fabaceae
- Subfamily: Faboideae
- Genus: Bossiaea
- Species: B. buxifolia

Binomial name
- Bossiaea buxifolia A.Cunn.
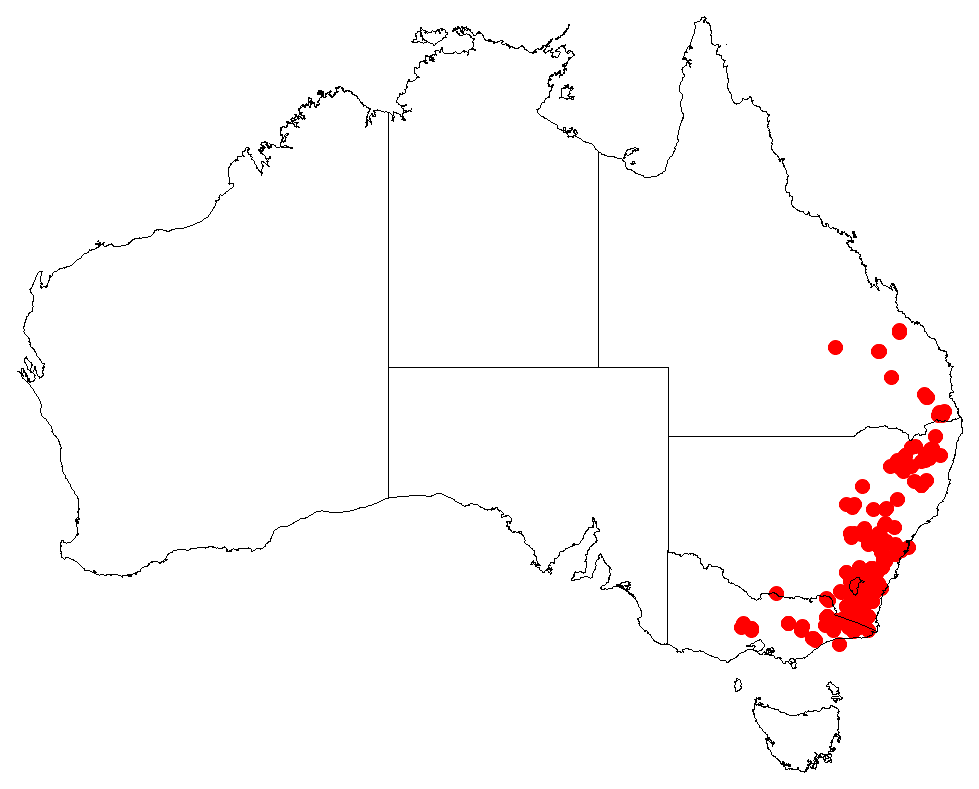
- Occurrence data from AVH

= Bossiaea buxifolia =

Matted bossiaea

Species of legume

Bossiaea buxifolia, commonly known as matted bossiaea, is a species of flowering plant in the family Fabaceae and is endemic to south-eastern Australia. It is a prostrate to weakly erect shrub with elliptic to egg-shaped or almost round leaves and yellow, red and purplish flowers.

== Description ==
Bossiaea buxifolia is a prostrate to weakly erect shrub that typically grows to a height of up to 50 cm (20 in) tall, although sometimes as high as 1.3 m (4 ft 3 in) and has softly-hairy stems. The leaves are arranged alternately, elliptic to egg-shaped or more or less round, mostly 2.5–5.0 mm (0.098–0.197 in) long and 2–5 mm (0.079–0.197 in) wide on a petiole 0.2–0.5 mm (0.0079–0.0197 in) long with narrow triangular stipules 1–2 mm (0.039–0.079 in) long at the base. The flowers are usually borne on short side branches, each flower 6–10 mm (0.24–0.39 in) long and borne on a pedicel 6–10 mm (0.24–0.39 in) long with a few small bracts and bracteoles 1–2 mm (0.039–0.079 in) long at the base. The sepals are 3–6 mm (0.12–0.24 in) long and joined at the base with the upper lobes 1.5–2.5 mm (0.059–0.098 in) long and the lower lobes slightly shorter. The standard petal is yellow with a red base, a darker colour on the back and up to 9 mm (0.35 in) long, the wings yellow and orange and slightly shorter than the standard, and the keel dark red to purplish and less than 6 mm (0.24 in) long. Flowering occurs from spring to early summer and the fruit is a narrow oblong pod 15–30 mm (0.59–1.18 in) long.

== Taxonomy ==
Bossiaea buxifolia was first formally described in 1825 by Allan Cunningham who found it growing "upon rocky, brushy hills" and published the description in the chapter "On the Botany of the Blue Mountains" of Barron Field's book, Geographical Memoirs on New South Wales. The specific epithet (buxifolia) means "box-tree-leaved".

== Distribution and habitat ==
Matted bossiaea grows in forest and woodland occurs south from Kroombit Tops National Park in south-eastern Queensland, along the coast and tablelands of eastern New South Wales and the Australian Capital Territory to the ranges east of Omeo in eastern Victoria.
