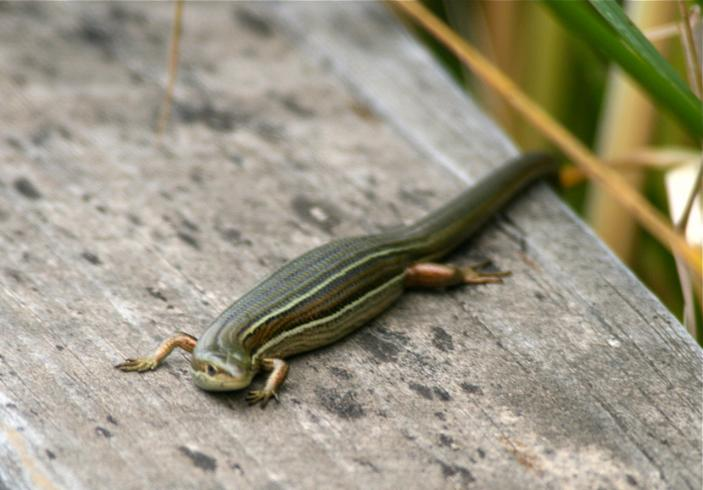

Conservation status
- Data Deficient (IUCN 3.1)

Scientific classification
- Kingdom: Animalia
- Phylum: Chordata
- Class: Reptilia
- Order: Squamata
- Family: Scincidae
- Genus: Pseudemoia
- Species: P. rawlinsoni

Binomial name
- Pseudemoia rawlinsoni (Hutchinson & Donnellan, 1988)

Synonyms
- Leiolopisma rawlinsoni Hutchinson & Donnellan, 1988; Pseudemoia rawlinsoni — Hutchinson et al., 1990

= Pseudemoia rawlinsoni =

Species of lizard

Pseudemoia rawlinsoni, also commonly known as the glossy grass skink and Rawlinson's window-eyed skink, is a species of lizard in the family Scincidae. The species is endemic to Australia.

== Etymology ==
The specific name, rawlinsoni, is in honour of Australian herpetologist Peter Alan Rawlinson (1942–1991).

== Geographic range ==
Native to southeastern Australia, P. rawlinsoni is found in New South Wales, South Australia, Tasmania, and Victoria.

== Habitat ==
The preferred natural habitats of P. rawlinsoni are grassland and freshwater wetlands.

== Reproduction ==
P. rawlinsoni is viviparous.
